= Heshbon Expedition =

The Heshbon Expedition is the name commonly used to refer to five seasons of archaeological excavations looking for biblical Heshbon at Tall Hisban in Jordan. The excavations were carried out by a team of archaeologists from Andrews University between 1968 and 1976. The first three campaigns (1968, 1971, and 1973) were led by Siegfried H. Horn of the Theological Seminary at Andrews University and Roger S. Boraas of Upsala College and last two (1974, 1976) by Lawrence T. Geraty, Horn's successor at Andrews, and Boraas.

== Biblical mentions of Heshbon ==
There are 38 references to Heshbon in the Old Testament, most of which recall in various ways the conquest by the Israelite tribes of Sihon, king of the Amorites at Heshbon, and the subsequent rebuilding of the town by the tribe of Reuben.

== Archaeological findings ==
The Heshbon Expedition failed to find clear archaeological evidence proving the Biblical account or existence of a King Sihon at Tall Hisban. This has led some scholars to look for other locations for biblical Heshbon. Others have welcomed it as support for a revisionist history of the origins of Israel. For still others this story is best understood as an example of cultural memory. More recently, it has been argued that the Israelites were nomadic and would not have left significant material remains.

== Contributions to archaeology in Jordan ==
The Heshbon Expedition was the first excavation of a multi-millennial archaeological tall in Jordan. The expedition was notable for its scientific rigor and meticulous excavation of all periods. Led by Chief Archaeologist Roger Boraas, stratigraphic excavation techniques were used to uncover a total of nineteen stratigraphic horizons spanning over three millennia of human occupation and accumulated archaeological remains.

The expedition led to three very consequential developments for the archaeology of Jordan.

=== Islamic pottery ===
The first was a ground-breaking study of the pottery of Hisban by James Sauer that included not only biblical and classical layers, but, significantly, also the more recent and not well-known Islamic layers.

=== New archaeology ===
The second was the introduction of the methods and procedures of the New Archaeology by anthropologist Oystein S. LaBianca with strong support from Roger Boraas and Lawrence Geraty.

=== Standardized terminology and procedures ===
The third was the development of standardized terminology and procedures for collection and recording of archaeological finds in the form of a dig manual authored by Larry Herr and other members of the team.

Other accomplishments for which the expedition has been noted include its prompt publication of preliminary reports and the ambitious and broad scope of its final publication series; its providing a training ground and field school for a large number of Jordanian and international students and scholars; its many spin-off projects, notably the launching of the Madaba Plains Project at Tall al-Umayri and Tall Jalul and eventually again at Tall Hisban, but including many others as well such as the Hesban North Church Project, Tall Jawa, Tall Balua, Abila of the Decapolis, Umm el Jimal.
