= Golden Eagle (disambiguation) =

The golden eagle is a large bird of prey.

Golden Eagle or golden eagle may also refer to:

== Arts and entertainment ==
- Golden Eagle (comics), two DC Comics characters
- Golden Eagle (film), a 1970 Thai action film
- Golden Eagle, a musical composition by Arnold Bax for a 1945 play by the same name
- Golden Eagles, the premium currency in the video game War Thunder
- Golden Eagle Award (disambiguation)

== Businesses ==
- Golden Eagle International Group, a Chinese retail and hotel conglomerate founded by Roger Wang
- Golden Eagle Airlines, a former regional airline of Western Australia
- GEB America, formerly Golden Eagle Broadcasting, a religious television network in the United States
- Golden Eagle Refinery, in the San Francisco Bay Area, California
- Golden Eagle, an Indian beer brewed by Mohan Meakin
- Golden Eagle, an energy drink made in Kosovo

== Civilian aviation ==
- Cessna 421 Golden Eagle, an American twin-engine aircraft
- AVIC Golden Eagle, a series of Chinese unmanned blimps
- Paladin Golden Eagle, an American powered parachute design
- Paraplane GE-2 Golden Eagle, an American powered parachute

== Military ==
- Sukhoi Su-47 Berkut (Su-47 Golden Eagle), an experimental USSR supersonic jet fighter
- KAI T-50 Golden Eagle, a family of South Korean supersonic jet trainers and fighters
- 140 Squadron (Israel), a former Israeli Air Force unit also known as the Golden Eagle Squadron
- SS Golden Eagle, original name of USS Arcturus (AF-52), a former US Navy stores ship

== Sporting events ==
- Golden Eagle (horse race), Australian horse race

== Sports teams ==
=== American collegiate and high school teams ===
- Brockport Golden Eagles, State University of New York at Brockport, New York
- Cal State Los Angeles Golden Eagles, California State University, Los Angeles, California
- Charleston Golden Eagles, University of Charleston, West Virginia
- Clarion University of Pennsylvania, Golden Eagles
- John Brown University, Golden Eagles, Arkansas
- La Sierra University, Golden Eagles, California
- Marquette Golden Eagles, Marquette University, Wisconsin
- Minnesota–Crookston Golden Eagles, University of Minnesota
- Oral Roberts Golden Eagles, Oral Roberts University, Oklahoma
- Southern Miss Golden Eagles and Lady Eagles, University of Southern Mississippi
- St. Joseph's College (New York), Golden Eagles
- Tennessee Tech Golden Eagles, Tennessee Technological University
- Ferndale High School (Washington), Golden Eagles

=== Other ===
- Golden Eagles (TBT), an American professional basketball team competing in The Basketball Tournament (TBT)
- Salt Lake Golden Eagles, a minor league professional hockey team based in Salt Lake City, Utah, from 1969 to 1994
- Shanghai Golden Eagles, a member of the China Baseball League
- Tohoku Rakuten Golden Eagles, a Japanese baseball team

== Other uses ==
- Golden Eagle, Illinois, United States, an unincorporated community
- Kineubenae (fl. 1797–1812), Ojibwa chief called "Golden Eagle" in English
- Order of the Golden Eagle, the highest order of Kazakhstan
- The Golden Eagle, thought to be the largest solid gold and diamond encrusted statue ever created
- PS Golden Eagle, a paddle steamer
- SS Golden Eagle, a prior name of the SS Mauna Loa, a cargo ship sunk in World War II
- Golden Eagle Regional Park & Sports Complex, Sparks, Nevada, United States
- Golden Eagle Oilfield
- Gold Award (Girl Scouts of the USA), formerly known as the Golden Eaglet.

== See also ==
- Gold Eagle (disambiguation)
- Berkut (disambiguation)
- Golden Earring
