= Levantine archaeology =

Archaeological study of the Levant

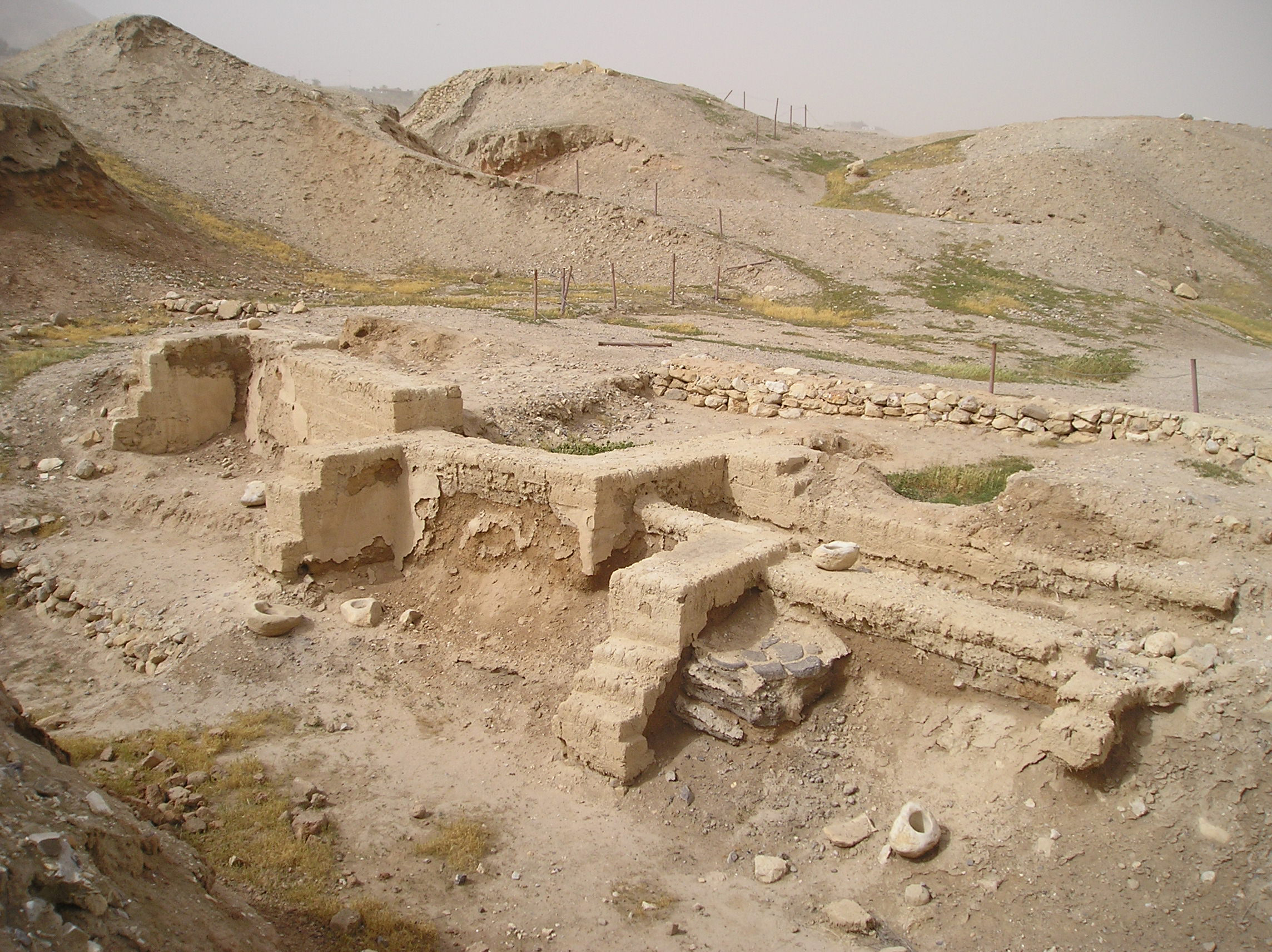
Dwelling foundations unearthed at Tell es-Sultan in Jericho

Levantine archaeology is the archaeological study of the Levant, a region encompassing the modern areas of Israel, Palestine, Jordan, Lebanon, Syria, and sometimes Cyprus. The field examines the material cultures of both the Northern and Southern Levant from prehistory through late antiquity. While older scholarship was dominated by biblical archaeology, Levantine archaeology in the 21st century has relegated biblical concerns to a less dominant position, functioning as a "big tent" incorporating multiple archaeological practices. The Levant has displayed cultural continuity during most historical periods, leading to the increased study of the region as a whole. Besides its importance to biblical archaeology, the Levant is highly important when forming an understanding of the history of the earliest peoples of the Stone Age.

Current archaeological digs in Israel are carried out by the Israel Antiquities Authority (IAA), and in the areas governed by the Palestinian Authority (PA), by its Ministry of Tourism and Antiquity, working under the auspices of the IAA. The Palestinian Authority prohibits unrestricted excavation at sites of archaeological importance. There are equivalent and similarly named authorities in Jordan and in Cyprus, a Directorate-General of Antiquities and Museums in Syria and a department of the Ministry of Culture and Tourism (Turkey).

== Terminology and scope ==
Levantine archaeology encompasses excavations, salvage, conservation and reconstruction efforts, as well as off-site research, interpretation, and other scholarship. The geographical scope of Levantine archaeology includes the Hatay Province of Turkey, Syria, Lebanon, Israel, Palestine, Jordan, and Cyprus. The terminology for archaeology in the Levant has been defined in various, often competing or overlapping ways. Prior to and during the period of the British Mandate in Palestine (1920–1948), the focus of archaeological inquiry was on biblical archaeology, or Palestinian archaeology.

Under the influence of William F. Albright (1891–1971), biblical inquiry and narratives were the priority; indeed, Albright conceived of Palestinian archaeology or Levantine archaeology as a sub-field of biblical archaeology. "The archaeology of ancient Israel," is described by Franken and Franken-Battershill as, "but a small part of the far greater study of Palestinian archaeology." in A Primer of Old Testament Archaeology (1963). In a survey of North American dissertations, the overwhelming emphasis has been on the southern Levant. However it is only when considering the northern Levant alongside the southern that wider archaeological and historical questions can be addressed.

While both Classical archaeology and Levantine archaeology deal with the same general region of study, the focus and approach of these interrelated disciplines differs. Even scholars who have continued to advocate a role for Classical archaeology have accepted the existence of a general branch of Levantine archaeology. In addition, Classical archaeology may cover areas relevant to the Bible outside of the Levant (e.g., Egypt or Persia) and it takes into account the use and explanation of biblical texts, which Levantine archaeologist ignore.

In academic, political, and public settings, the region's archaeology can also be described in terms of ancient or modern Israel, Jordan, Palestine, Lebanon, Syria, Cyprus, and the Hatay province of Turkey. Archaeologists may define the geographic range more narrowly, especially for inquiries that focus on 'Israel' or 'Palestine,' whether construed as ancient or modern territories. The terms "Syro-Palestinian archaeology" or "Palestinian archaeology" are still used (particularly when the area of inquiry centers on ancient Palestine). Shifting terminology over the past 50 years reflects political tensions that operate within and upon the field.

=== Temporal scope ===
From prehistoric times through the Iron Age, chronological periods are usually named in keeping with technological developments that characterized that era. From the Babylonian era onward, naming is based on historical events. Scholars often disagree on the exact dates and terminology to be used for each period.

Some definitions for the temporal scope, particularly earlier on tended to exclude events after the Byzantine Period, but the temporal scope of Levantine archaeology has expanded over the years. In 1982, James A. Sauer wrote that the Islamic periods (630–1918 CE) were part of Levantine archaeological research, and that while some periods had been "ignored, neglected, or even discarded for the sake of other periods," it is now "an almost universally accepted principle that archaeological evidence from all periods must be treated with equal care."

Leslie J. Hoppe, writing in 1987, submits that Dever's definition of temporal scope of Levantine archaeology excludes the Early Arab period (640–1099), the Crusader period (1099–1291), the Mamluk period (1250–1517) and the Ottoman period (1517–1918). However, Dever's definition of the temporal scope of the field in What Did the Biblical Writers Know, and When Did They Know It? (2001), indicates that Hoppe's critique is no longer valid. There, Dever writes that the time-frame of Levantine archaeology, "extends far beyond the 'biblical period,' embracing everything from the Lower Paleolithic to the Ottoman period."

==== List of archaeological periods ====
The list below, from the Paleolithic Age to the Byzantine period, is drawn from the definitions provided by the Mercer Dictionary of the Bible. For periods thereafter, the terminology and dates come from Sauer and Hoppe.

Prehistory is defined as the period preceding the advent of writing, which brought about the creation of written history. For the Levant the introduction of writing occurs at varying moments, but the Late Bronze Age is considered as the first period firmly outside prehistory. To avoid sub-regional conflicts, the prehistory as a category is left out of the list.

- Paleolithic (Old Stone) Age = 1,500,000–14,000 BCE
- Epipaleolithic (Mesolithic, Middle Stone) Age = 14,000–8,000 BCE
- Neolithic (New Stone) Age = 8,000–5,800 BCE
- Chalcolithic (Copper Stone) Age = 5,800–3,700 BCE
- Bronze Age
  - Early Bronze (EB) Age = 3,700–2,500 BCE
  - EB IV/Intermediate Bronze (IB) (formerly EB IV/MB I) = 2,500–2,000 BCE
  - Middle Bronze (MB) Age = 2,200–1,550 BCE
    - MB I (formerly MB IIA) = 2,000–1,750 BCE
    - MB II(–III) (formerly MB IIB/C) = 1,750–1550 BCE
  - Late Bronze (LB) Age = 1,550–1,200 BCE
    - LB I = 1,550–1,400 BCE
    - LB II = 1,400–1,200 BCE
- Iron Age = 1,200–586 BCE
  - Iron I = 1,200–980 BCE
  - Iron IIA = 980–830 BCE
  - Iron IIB = 830–721 BCE
  - Iron IIC = 721–586 BCE
- Babylonian period = 586–539 BCE
- Persian period = 539–332 BCE
- Hellenistic period = 332–63 BCE
  - Early Hellenistic = 332–198 BCE
  - Late Hellenistic = 198–63 BCE
- Nabatean period = 300 BCE–106 CE
- Roman period = 63 BCE – 324 CE
  - Early Roman = 63 BCE – 135 CE
  - Late Roman = 135–324 CE
- Byzantine period = 324–640 CE
- Islamic period = 630–1918 CE
  - Early Arab period = 640–1099 CE
  - Crusader period = 1099–1291 CE
  - Mamluk period = 1250–1517 CE
  - Ottoman period = 1517–1918 CE

== History ==
Modern Levantine archaeology began in the late 19th century. Early expeditions lacked standardized methods for excavation and interpretation, and were often little more than treasure-hunting expeditions. A lack of awareness of the importance of stratigraphy in dating objects led to digging long trenches through the middle of a site that made work by later archaeologists more difficult.

Edward Robinson identified numerous sites from antiquity and published his findings with Eli Smith in a pivotal three-volume study entitled Biblical Researches in Palestine and the Adjacent Regions: Journal of Travels in the Year 1838. In Syria, Ernest Renan carried out research in the 1860s and Howard Crosby Butler of Princeton University carried out surveys of Byzantine Christian sites (1904–1909). In the early 1900s, major projects were set up at Samaria, Gezer, Megiddo and Jericho.

An early school of modern Levantine archaeology was led by William F. Albright, whose work focused on biblical narratives. Albright himself held that Frederick Jones Bliss (1857–1939) was the father of Levantine archaeology, although Bliss is not well known in the field. Jeffrey A. Blakely attributes this to Bliss' successor at the Palestine Exploration Fund, R.A.S. Macalister (1870–1950), who underplayed his predecessor's achievements.

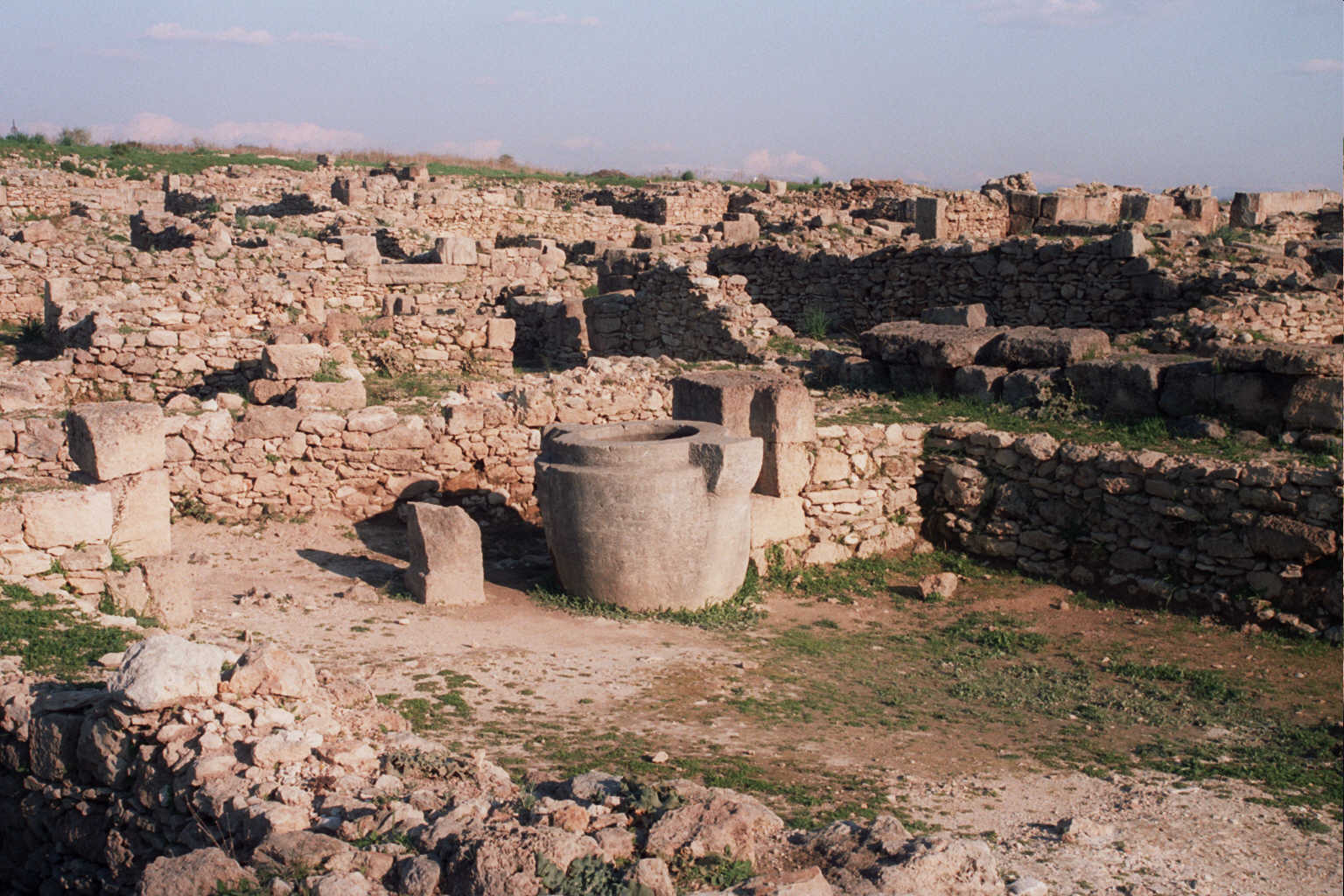
Excavated ruins at Ras Shamra in Syria

After the creation of independent Arab states in the region, national schools of archaeology were established in the 1960s. The research focuses and perspectives of these institutions differed from those of Western archaeological approaches, tending to eschew biblical studies and the search for theological roots in the Holy Land and concentrating more, though not exclusively on Islamic archaeology.

In doing so, Arab archaeologists added a "vigorous new element to Syro-Palestinian archaeology."

While the importance of stratigraphy, typology and balk grew in the mid-twentieth century, the continued tendency to ignore hard data in favour of subjective interpretations invited criticism. Paul W. Lapp, for example, whom many thought would take up the mantle of Albright before his premature death in 1970, wrote:

"Too much of Palestinian archaeology is an inflated fabrication [...] Too often a subjective interpretation, not based on empirical stratigraphic observation, is used to demonstrate the validity of another subjective interpretation. We assign close dates to a group of pots on subjective typological grounds and go on to cite our opinion as independent evidence for similarly dating a parallel group. Too much of Palestinian archaeology's foundation building has involved chasing ad hominem arguments around in a circle."

In 1974, William Dever established the secular, non-biblical school of Syro-Palestinian archaeology and mounted a series of attacks on the very definition of biblical archaeology. Dever argued that the name of such inquiry should be changed to "archaeology of the Bible" or "archaeology of the Biblical period" to delineate the narrow temporal focus of Biblical archaeologists. Frank Moore Cross, who had studied under Albright and had taught Dever, emphasized that in Albright's view, biblical archaeology was not synonymous with Levantine archaeology, but rather that, "William Foxwell Albright regarded Palestinian archaeology or Levantine archaeology as a small, if important section of biblical archaeology. One finds it ironical that recent students suppose them interchangeable terms." Dever agreed that the terms were not interchangeable, but claimed that "'Syro-Palestinian archaeology' is not the same as the 'biblical archaeology'. I regret to say that all who would defend Albright and 'biblical archaeology' on this ground, are sadly out of touch with reality in the field of archaeology."

In recent decades, the term Levantine archaeology has generally replaced Syro-Palestinian archaeology. Electronic database results reveal an "overwhelming adoption" of the term ‘Levant’ when compared to ‘Syria-Palestine’ for archaeological studies. This is primarily due to the strong cultural and geographic continuity of the Levant, the northern sections of which were generally ignored in Syro-Palestinian archaeology. Towards the end of the twentieth century, Palestinian archaeology and/or Levantine archaeology became a more interdisciplinary practice. Specialists in archaeozoology, archaeobotany, geology, anthropology and epigraphy now work together to produce essential environmental and non-environmental data in multidisciplinary projects.

== Foci in Levantine archaeology ==
=== Ceramics analysis ===
A central concern of Levantine archaeology since its genesis has been the study of ceramics. Whole pots and richly decorated pottery are uncommon in the Levant and the plainer, less ornate ceramic artifacts of the region have served the analytical goals of archaeologists, much more than those of museum collectors. The ubiquity of pottery sherds and their long history of use in the region makes ceramics analysis a particularly useful sub-discipline of Levantine archaeology, used to address issues of terminology and periodization.

Awareness of the value of pottery gained early recognition in a landmark survey conducted by Edward Robinson and Eli Smith, whose findings were published in first two works on the subject: Biblical Researches in Palestine (1841) and Later Biblical Researches (1851).

Ceramics analysis in Levantine archaeology has suffered from insularity and conservatism, due to the legacy of what J.P Dessel and Alexander H. Joffe call "the imperial hubris of pan-optic 'Biblical Archaeology.'" The dominance of biblical archaeological approaches meant that the sub-discipline was cut off from other branches of ancient Near Eastern studies, apart from occasional references to Northwest Semitic epigraphy and Assyriology, as exemplified in the Mesha Stele, the Sefire Stelae, and the Tel Dan Stele.

As a result, widely varying principles, emphases, and definitions are used to determine local typologies among archaeologists working in the region. Attempts to identify and bridge the gaps made some headway at the Durham conference, though it was recognized that agreement on a single method of ceramic analysis or a single definition of a type may not be possible.

The solution proposed by Dessel and Joffe is for all archaeologists in the field to provide more explicit descriptions of the objects that they study. The more information provided and shared between those in related sub-disciplines, the more likely it is that they will be able to identify and understand the commonalities in the different typological systems.

=== Defining Phoenician ===
Levantine archaeology also includes the study of Phoenician culture, cosmopolitan in character and widespread in its distribution in the region. According to Benjamin Sass and Christoph Uehlinger, the questions of what is actually Phoenician and what is specifically Phoenician, in Phoenician iconography, constitute one well-known crux of Levantine archaeology. Without answers to these questions, the authors contend that research exploring the degree to which Phoenician art and symbolism penetrated into the different areas of Syria and Palestine will make little progress.

== Practitioners ==
=== Israeli ===
Jewish interest in archaeology dates to the beginnings of the Zionist movement and the founding of the Jewish Palestine Exploration Society in 1913. Excavations at this early stage focused on sites related to the Bible and ancient Jewish history and included Philistine sites in Afula and Nahariya, as well as a second- to fourth-century village at Beth She'arim and a synagogue in Bet Alpha. Early archaeological pioneers in 1920s and 1930s included Nahman Avigad, Michael Avi-Yonah, Ruth Amiran, Immanuel Ben-Dor, Avraham Biran, Benjamin Mazar, E.L. Sukenik, and Shmuel Yeivin.

By the 1950s, in contrast to the religious motivations of Biblical archaeologists, Israeli archaeology developed as a secular discipline, motivated in part by the nationalistic desire to affirm the link between the modern, nascent Israeli nation-state and the ancient Jewish population of the land. To some, paleolithic archaeology was of little interest, nor was archaeology of Christian and Muslim periods. Yigael Yadin, the pioneer of the Israeli School of archaeology, excavated some of the most important sites in the region, including the Qumran Caves, Masada, Hazor and Tel Megiddo. Yadin's world view was that the identity of modern Israel was directly tied to the revolutionary past of the ancient Jewish population of the region. He therefore focused much of his work on excavating sites related to previous periods of Israelite nationalistic struggles: Hazor, which he associated with the conquest of Canaan by Joshua in c. 1250 BCE, and Masada, the site where Jewish rebels held out against the Romans in 72-73 CE. Masada was extensively excavated by a team led by Yadin from 1963 to 1965 and became a monument symbolizing the will of the new Israeli state to survive.

Today, Israeli universities have respected archaeology departments and institutes involved in research, excavation, conservation and training. Notable contemporary archaeologists include Eilat Mazar, Yoram Tsafrir, Ronny Reich, Ehud Netzer, Adam Zertal, Yohanan Aharoni, Eli Shukron, Gabriel Barkay, Israel Finkelstein, Yizhar Hirschfeld, and many more.

=== British and European ===
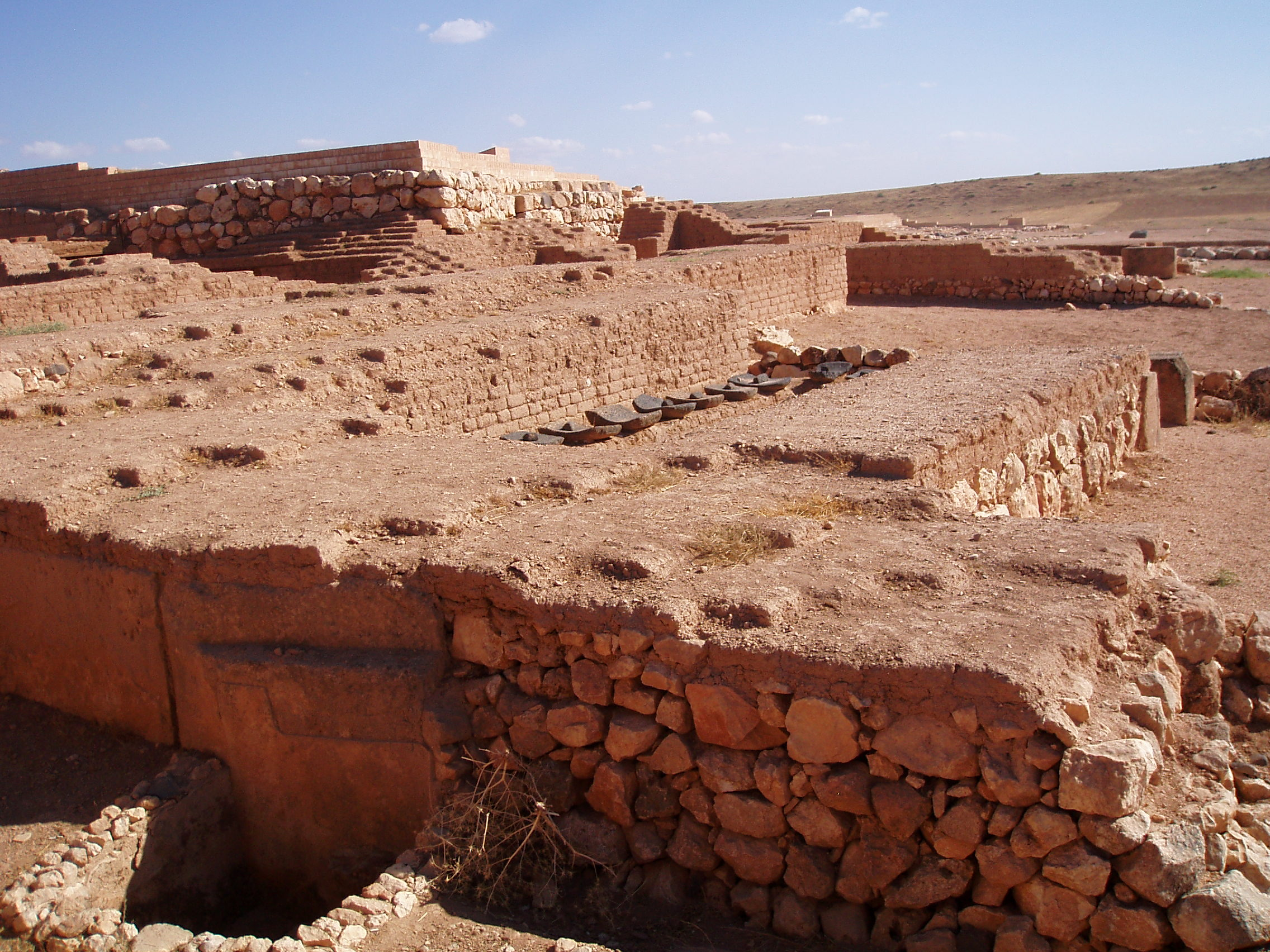
The excavation site at Ebla in Syria

European archaeologists also continue to excavate and research in the region, with many of these projects centered in Arab countries, primary among them Jordan and Syria, and to a lesser extent in Lebanon. The most significant British excavations include the Tell Nebi Mend site (Qadesh) in Syria and the Tell Iktanu and Tell es-Sa'adiyah sites in Jordan. Other notable European projects include Italian excavations at Tell Mardikh (Ebla) and Tell Meskene (Emar) in Syria, French participation in Ras Shamra (Ugarit) in Syria, French excavations at Tell Yarmut and German excavations at Tell Masos (both in modern-day Israel), and Dutch excavations Tell Deir 'Alla in Jordan.

Italian archaeologists were the first to undertake joint missions with Palestinian archaeologists in the West Bank, which were possible only after the signing of the Oslo Accords. The first joint project was conducted in Jericho and coordinated by Hamdan Taha, director of the Palestinian Antiquities Department and the University of Rome "La Sapienza", represented by Paolo Matthiae, the same archaeologist who discovered the site of Ebla in 1964. Unlike the joint missions between Americans and Jordanians, this project involved Italians and Palestinians digging at the same holes, side by side.

=== North American ===
Apart from Israeli archaeologists, Americans make up the largest group of archaeologists working in Israel. Joint American-Jordanian excavations have been conducted, but Nicolo Marchetti, an Italian archaeologist, says they do not constitute genuine collaboration: "[...] you might find, at a site, one hole with Jordanians and 20 holes with Americans digging in them. After the work, usually it's the Americans who explain to the Jordanians what they've found."

=== Palestinian ===
Palestinians have long been involved in archaeological study and fieldwork in Palestine, but without control or influence over the institutions carrying out this work, their contributions have often been obscured and sidelined. One of the first Palestinian archaeologists to carry out field excavations for example, was a woman known only as Yusra, who made the important discovery of the Tabun I Neanderthal skull while working with Dorothy Garrod between 1929 and 1935.

== Archaeology in Israel ==
Excavation in Israel continues at a relatively rapid pace and is conducted according to generally high standards. Excavators return each year to a number of key sites that have been selected for their potential scientific and cultural interest. Current excavated sites of importance include Ashkelon, Hazor, Megiddo, Tel es-Safi, Dor, Hippos, Tel Kabri, Gamla and Rehov. Recent issues center on the veracity of such artifacts as the Jehoash Inscription and the James Ossuary, as well as the validity of whole chronological schemes. Amihai Mazar and Israel Finkelstein represent leading figures in the debate over the nature and chronology of the United Monarchy.

== Archaeology in Palestine ==
After Israel occupied the area during the 1967 war, all antiquities in the area came under the control of the Archaeological Staff Officer, who is the head of the Archaeology Department of the Civil Administration (ADCA). Though the Hague Convention prohibits the removal of cultural property from militarily occupied areas, both foreign and Israeli archaeologists mounted extensive excavations that have been criticized as overstepping the bounds of legitimate work to protect endangered sites. Vast amounts of new archaeological data have been uncovered in these explorations, although critics say that "relatively little effort was made to preserve or protect archaeological remains from the later Islamic and Ottoman periods, which were of direct relevance to the areas Muslim inhabitants." By 2007, the ADCA had been involved with over 6,000 archaeological sites in the West Bank including surveys and excavations, the vast majority of which had been kept from public and academic knowledge.

== Archaeology of the Old City of Jerusalem ==
=== Sovereignty dispute ===
Proposals to internationalize the Old City of Jerusalem have been rejected by all parties in the Israeli-Arab conflict, each insisting on exclusive sovereignty. Neil Silberman, an Israeli archaeologist, has demonstrated how legitimate archaeological research and preservation efforts have been exploited by Palestinians and Israelis for partisan ends. Rather than attempting to understand "the natural process of demolition, eradication, rebuilding, evasion, and ideological reinterpretation that has permitted ancient rulers and modern groups to claim exclusive possession," archaeologists have become active participants in the battle. Silberman writes that archaeology, a seemingly objective science, has exacerbated, rather than ameliorated the ongoing nationalist dispute: "The digging continues. Claims and counterclaims about exclusive historical 'ownership' weave together the random acts of violence of bifurcated collective memory."

An archaeological tunnel running the length of the western side of the Temple Mount, as it is known to Jews, or the Haram al-Sharif, as it is known to Muslims, sparked a serious conflict in 1996. As a result, rioting broke out in Jerusalem and spread to the West Bank, leading to the deaths of 86 Palestinians and 15 Israeli soldiers.

=== Damage to archaeological sites ===
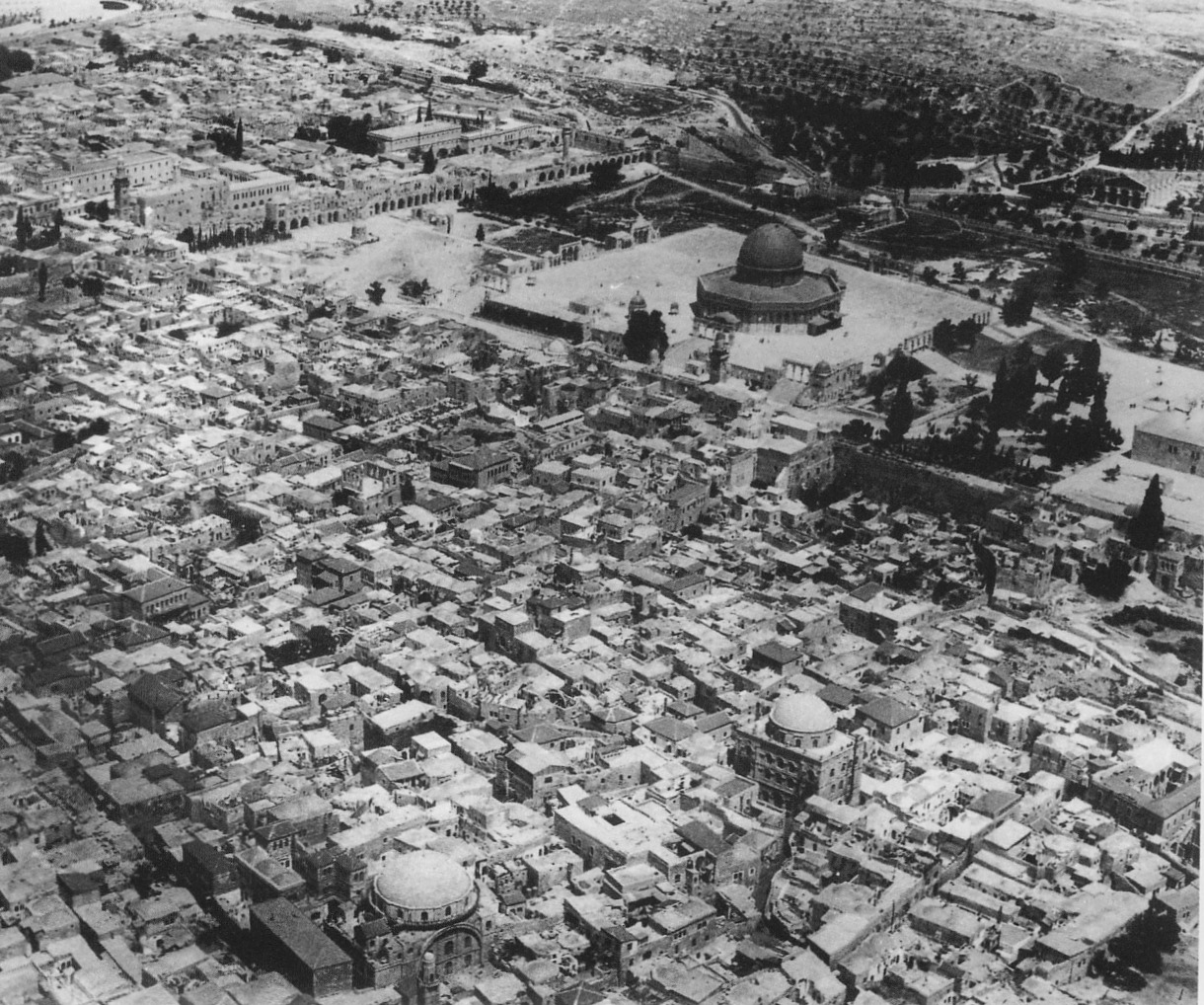
The Old City of Jerusalem in the early 20th century. The Jewish quarter is at the bottom of the image. The two large domes at the middle and lowerground are the Hurva Synagogue and the Tiferes Yisrael Synagogue, both of which were destroyed by the Jordanians in 1948. The dome in the background is the Dome of the Rock.

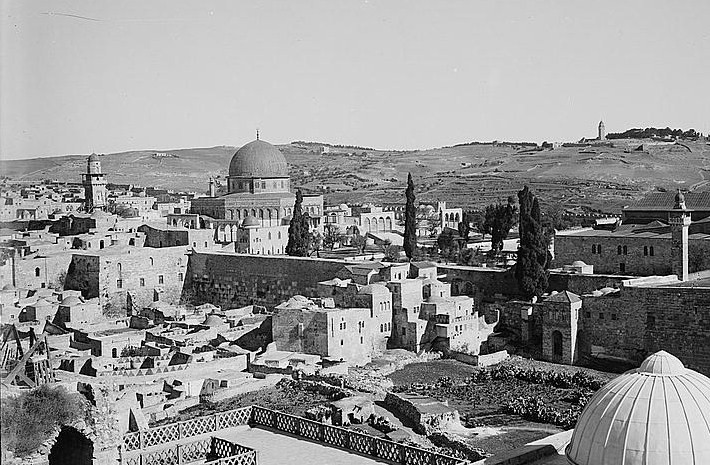
Historic photo of the Mughrabi Quarter with the Dome of the Rock in the background, before it was razed by Israel three days after the Six-Day War of 1967

During the 1948 Arab-Israeli war, and throughout the period of Jordanian rule of Jerusalem which ended in 1967, Jordanian authorities and military forces undertook a policy described by their military commander as "calculated destruction", aimed at the Jewish Quarter in the Old City of Jerusalem. The Jordanian actions were described in a letter to the United Nations by Yosef Tekoa, Israel's permanent representative to the organization at the time, as a "policy of wanton vandalism, desecration and violation," which resulted in the destruction of all but one of 35 Jewish houses of worship. Synagogues were razed or pillaged. Many of them were demolished by explosives, and others subjected to ritual desecration, through the conversion to stables. In the ancient historic Jewish graveyard on the Mount of Olives, tens of thousands of tombstones, some dating from as early as 1 BCE, were torn up, broken or used as flagstones, steps and building materials in Jordanian military installations. Large areas of the cemetery were levelled and turned into parking lots and gas stations.

The Old City of Jerusalem and its walls were added to the List of World Heritage in Danger in 1982, after it was nominated for inclusion by Jordan. Noting the "severe destruction followed by a rapid urbanization," UNESCO determined that the site met "the criteria proposed for the inscription of properties on the List of World Heritage in Danger as they apply to both 'ascertained danger' and 'potential danger'."

Work carried out by the Islamic Waqf since the late 1990s to convert two ancient underground structures into a large new mosque on the Temple Mount/Haram al-Sharif damaged archaeological artifacts in Solomon's Stables and Huldah Gates areas. From October 1999 to January 2000, the Waqf authorities in Jerusalem opened an emergency exit to the newly renovated underground mosque, in the process digging a pit measuring 18,000 square feet (1,672 m^{2}) and 36 feet (11 m) deep. The Israel Antiquities Authority (IAA) expressed concern over the damage sustained to Muslim-period structures within the compound as a result of the digging. Jon Seligman, a Jerusalem District archaeologist told Archaeology magazine that, "It was clear to the IAA that an emergency exit [at the Marwani Mosque] was necessary, but in the best situation, salvage archaeology would have been performed first." Seligman also said that the lack of archaeological supervision "has meant a great loss to all of humanity. It was an archeological crime.".

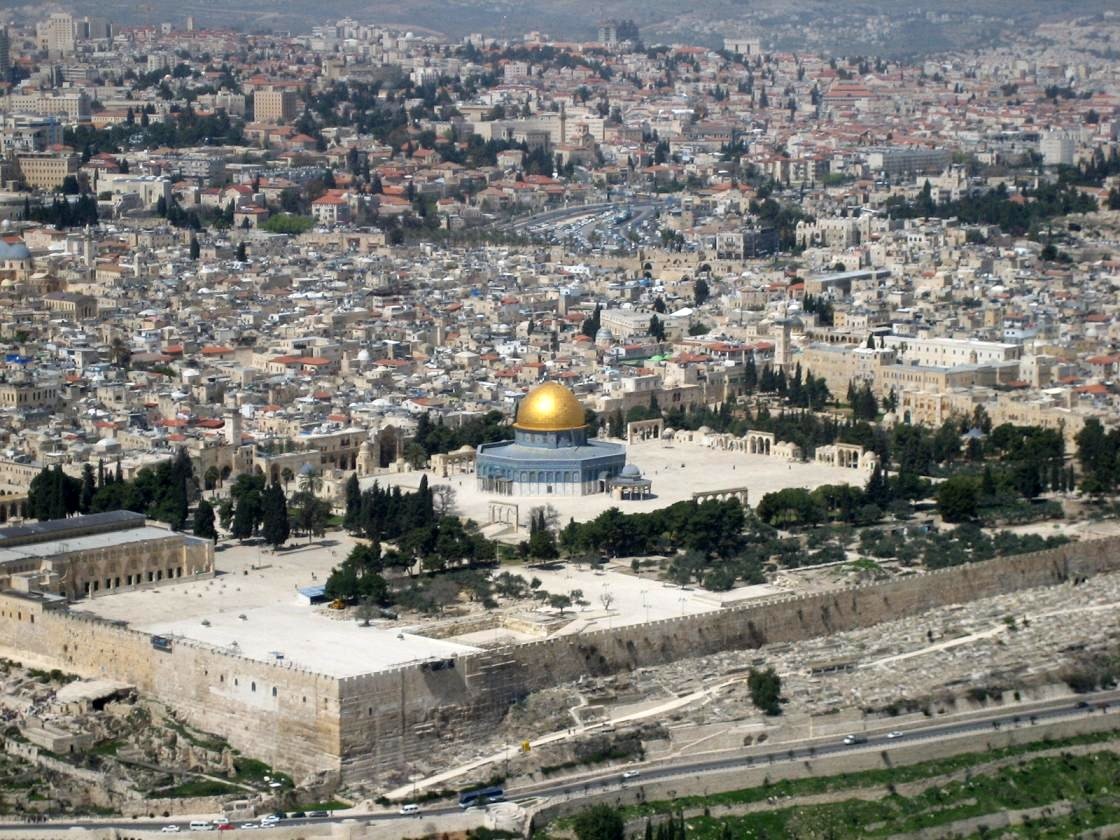
The Temple Mount/Haram al-Sharif compound

Some Israeli archaeologists also charged that archaeological material dating to the First Temple Period (c. 960-586 BCE) was destroyed when the thousands of tons of ancient fill from the site were dumped into the Kidron Valley, as well as into Jerusalem's municipal garbage dump, where it mixed with the local garbage, making it impossible to conduct archaeological examination. They further contended that the Waqf was deliberately removing evidence of Jewish remains. For example, Eilat Mazar told Ynet news that the actions by the Waqf were linked to the routine denials of the existence of the Jerusalem Temples by senior officials of the Palestinian Authority. She stated that, "They want to turn the whole of the Temple Mount into a mosque for Muslims only. They don't care about the artifacts or heritage on the site." However, Seligman and Gideon Avni, another Israeli archaeologist, told Archaeology magazine that while the fill did indeed contain shards from the First Temple period, they were located in originally unstratified fill and therefore lacked any serious archaeological value.

== Archaeology in Jordan ==
Compared to Israel, archaeological knowledge about Jordan (formerly Transjordan) remains less thoroughly documented, though it has steadily grown since the 20th century.

Two universities, the University of Jordan and Yarmouk University, offer archaeology studies. Apart from the work of the official antiquities department, there are many foreign-educated professional archaeologists in Jordan, working on dozens of field projects. Findings have been published in the four-volume Studies in the History and Archaeology of Jordan (1982–1992).

Among the most influential initiatives is the Madaba Plains Project (MPP), launched in the early 1980s to continue research in the region between Amman and Madaba. MPP’s excavations at Tall Hisban, Tall Jalul and associated survey areas have engaged over 2,000 students and volunteers over five decades; making it Jordan’s longest‑running archaeological effort. Other regional projects include the Gadara region and Tall Zira'a excavations, ongoing since the 2000s. These examine more than 5,000 years of human settlement, using systematic geophysical prospection, survey, excavations and archaeometric analyses of pottery, glass and agricultural remains.

Multi‑disciplinary research in areas such as Wadi Zarqa, Hisma and Wadi Hammieh has produced lithic assemblages from the Lower, Middle, and Late Palaeolithic periods. Prehistoric faunal remains, including elephant teeth, have been associated with Acheulean tools dating back to the Early Pleistocene. More than thirty new Late Acheulean and Middle Palaeolithic sites continue to be studied, especially in southern Jordan. The Murayghat site in the Madaba region (sometimes called “Jordan’s Stonehenge”) spans from the Neolithic to Islamic periods (c. 8000 BCE to 1500 CE). It features dolmens, standing stones, ritual landscapes, stone circles and domestic structures, investigated under the Ritual Landscapes of Murayghat Project directed by the University of Copenhagen since 2014. Finds include Early Bronze Age pottery, stone tools and architectural remains.

The Department of Antiquities maintains a national system, JADIS (Jordanian Antiquities Database and Information System), which has catalogued over 8,600 known archaeological sites as of the mid‑1990s. Combined with Geographic Information Systems, photogrammetry, aerial imagery and CAD technologies, JADIS supports both heritage management and academic research.

== Archaeology in Lebanon ==
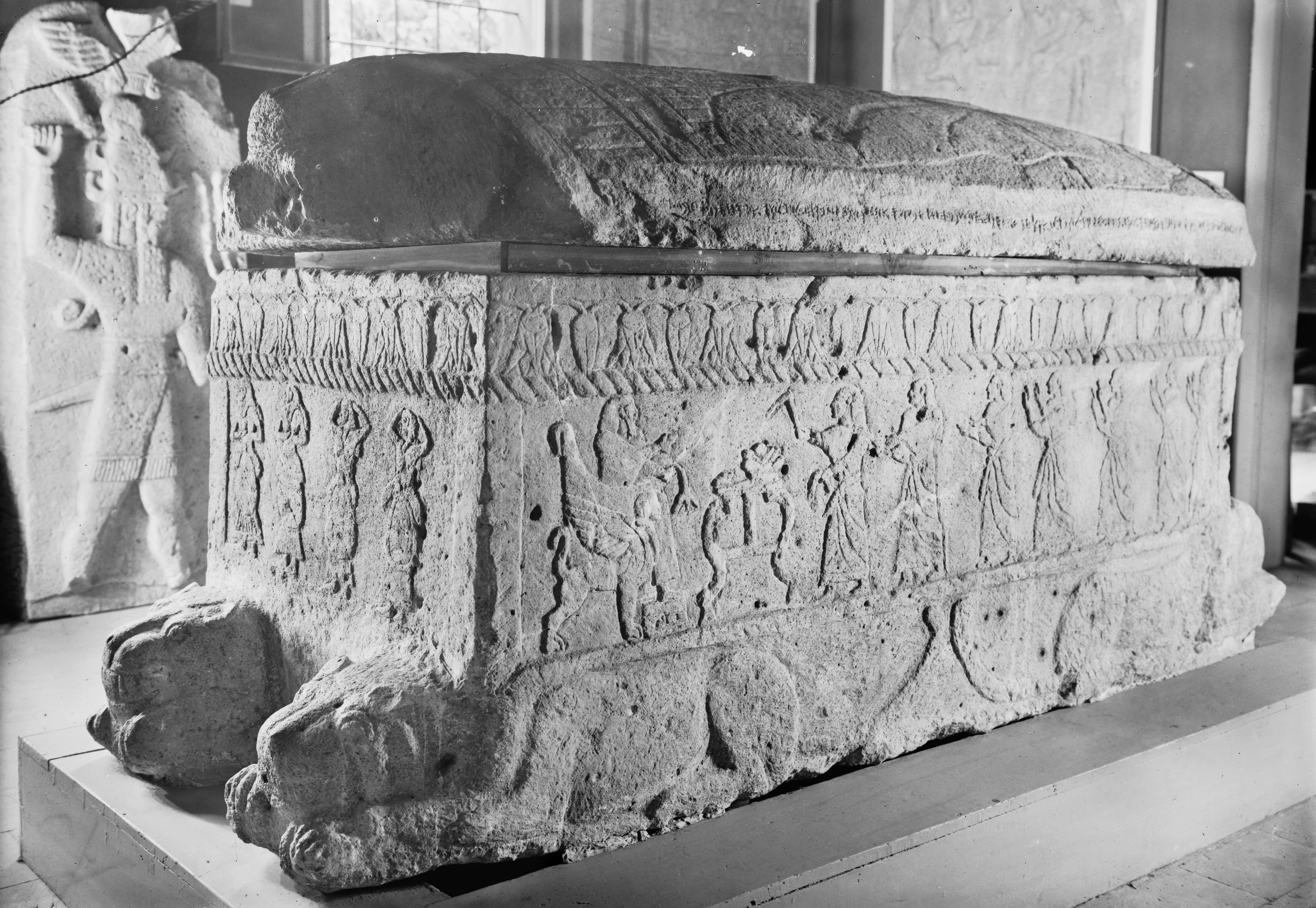
Sarcophagus of Ahiram in the National Museum of Beirut

Important sites in Lebanon dating to the Neanderthal period include Adloun, Chekka Jdidé, El-Masloukh, Ksar Akil, Nahr Ibrahim and Naame. Byblos is a well-known archaeological site, a Phoenician seaport, where the tomb of Ahiram is believed to be located. An ancient Phoenician inscription on the tomb dates to between the 13th and 10th centuries BCE. Byblos, as well as archaeological sites in Baalbek, Tyre, Sidon, and Tripoli, contain artifacts indicating the presence of libraries dating back to the period of Classical antiquity.

== Archaeology in Syria ==
Coastal, central and southern Syria (including modern Lebanon) "constitute the major part of ancient Canaan, or the southern Levant," and according to Dever, the area is "potentially far richer in archaeology remains than Palestine." Yet, in the 19th century, Syria received significantly less archaeological exploration than Palestine. Beginning in the 1920s, large excavations have been conducted in such key sites as Ebla, Hama, and Ugarit. Albright envisioned Palestine and Syria within the same cultural orbit and, though best known for his pioneering work on biblical archaeology, he also foreshadowed contemporary scholars in using "Syro-Palestinian" to integrate the archaeology from Syria.

Syria is often acknowledged to be a "crossroads of civilizations", "traversed by caravans and military expeditions moving between the economic and political poles of the Ancient Near Eastern world, from Egypt to Anatolia, from the Mediterranean to Mesopotamia." While there is significant geographical and cultural overlap with its neighbouring regions, Akkermans and Schwartz note that specialists in Syria itself, rarely use the term "Syro-Palestinian archaeology" to describe their inquiries in the field. Syria can be seen as a distinct and autonomous geographical and cultural entity whose rainfall-farming plains could support larger scale populations, communities, and political units than those in Palestine and Lebanon.

Following the program of the French Mandate, the Syrian school of archaeology has an official antiquities department, museums in Aleppo and Damascus, and at least two important scholarly journals.

== Archaeology in Turkey (Hatay Province) ==
The Amuq Valley in the Hatay Province of Turkey has aided in the understanding of western Syrian historical chronologies. Robert Braidwood documented 178 ancient sites in the Amuq Valley, eight of which were then further excavated. Artifacts recovered from these excavations helped in the formation of a historical chronology of Syrian archaeology spanning from the Neolithic to the Early Bronze Age.

== Archaeology, history, and modern Arab–Israeli politics ==
Archaeology has been widely influenced by the modern Arab–Israeli conflict. During the British Mandate in Palestine, many Jewish and Christian populations have renewed their interest in the ancient Judaic archaeological sites located in the region. Several Palestinian authors argue that Zionists, or individuals who believe in a Jewish homeland, use archaeology to create a sense of national identity. One author, in a highly controversial book, stated that a joint project of the Jewish Palestine Exploration Society and the Government Naming Committee attempted to rename sites from an Arab-Ottoman template to the template of biblical Israel. Today this attitude is an important factor in the controversy over the West Bank. Judea and Samaria are the biblical and historical names of the southern and northern West Bank, used by Jews and Western scholars prior to the emergence of the term "West Bank" after the occupation of the region by Jordan. The historical regions of Judea and Samaria are holding several archaeological sites containing major findings from the time of the Israelite and Jewish past and yielded important ancient Hebrew artifacts.

== See also ==
- Archaeology of Israel
- List of archaeological sites in Israel and Palestine
- Near Eastern archaeology
- Near Eastern bioarchaeology
- Prehistory of the Levant

== Bibliography ==
- Adam, Heribert; Moodley, Kogila (2005). Seeking Mandela: Peacemaking Between Israelis and Palestinians. Temple University Press. ISBN 978-1-59213-396-3..
- Aharoni, Yohanan (1982). Aharoni, Miriam (ed.). The archaeology of the land of Israel: from the prehistoric beginnings to the end of the First Temple period. Translated by Rainey, Anson F. Philadelphia: Westminster Press.
- Akkermans, Peter M. M. G.; Schwartz, Glenn M. (2003). The Archaeology of Syria: From Complex Hunter-gatherers to Early Urban Societies (ca. 16,000-300 BC). Cambridge University Press. ISBN 978-0-521-79666-8..
- Anati, Emmanuel (1963). Palestine Before the Hebrews: A History, From the Earliest Arrival of Man to the Conquest of Canaan. Jonathan Cape..
- Barton, John (2002). The Biblical World. Routledge. ISBN 978-0-415-16105-3..
- Bar-Yosef, Ofer; Mazar, Amihai (February 1982). "Israeli Archaeology". World Archaeology. 13 (3): 310–325. doi:10.1080/00438243.1982.9979836.
- Bromiley, Geoffrey William (1995). "The International Standard Bible Encyclopedia". Wm. B. Eerdmans Publishing.
- Davis, Thomas W. (2004). Shifting Sands: The Rise and Fall of Biblical Archaeology. Oxford University Press. ISBN 978-0-19-516710-8..
- Dever, William G. (2001). What Did the Biblical Writers Know, and when Did They Know It?. Wm. B. Eerdmans Publishing. ISBN 978-0-8028-2126-3.
- Dever, William G. (2003). Who Were the Early Israelites and Where Did They Come from?. Wm. B. Eerdmans Publishing. ISBN 978-0-8028-0975-9..
- Dever, William G (1999–2001). "Syro-Palestinian and Biblical Archaeology". In Tim Murray (ed.). Encyclopedia of Archaeology. ABC-Clio Press. pp. 1244–1253.
- Ego, Beate; Lange, Armin; Pilhofer, Peter; Ehlers, Kathrin (1999). ""Josephus' View on Judaism without the Temple in Light of the Discoveries at Masada and Murabba'at" in Gemeinde ohne Tempel: Community without Temple". Mohr Siebeck.
- Ferguson, Everett (2003). "Backgrounds of Early Christianity". Wm. B. Eerdmans Publishing.
- Franken, Hendricus Jacobus; Franken-Battershill, C. A. (1963). "A Primer of Old Testament Archaeology". E.J. Brill.
- Freedman, David Noel (2000). Eerdmans Dictionary of the Bible. Wm. B. Eerdmans Publishing. ISBN 978-0-8028-2400-4..
- Gold, Dore (2007). The Fight for Jerusalem. Regnery Publishing. ISBN 978-1-59698-029-7.
- Henry, Roger (2003). Synchronized Chronology: Rethinking Middle East Antiquity. Algora Publishing. ISBN 978-0-87586-185-2..
- Kipfer, Barbara Ann (2000). Encyclopedic Dictionary of Archaeology. Springer. ISBN 978-0-306-46158-3.
- Kletter, Raz (2006). Just past? The making of Israeli archaeology. Equinox. ISBN 978-1-84553-085-3.
- Levine, Lee I. (1998). Judaism and Hellenism in Antiquity: Conflict Or Confluence. Seattle and London: University of Washington Press. ISBN 978-0-295-97682-2. JSTOR j.ctvcwnpvs.
- Levy, Thomas Evan (1998). Archaeology of Society in the Holy Land. Continuum International Publishing Group. ISBN 978-0-8264-6996-0.
- Macalister, Robert Alexander Stewart (1925). A century of excavation in Palestine. London: The Religious Tract Society.
- Millard, Ralph (1997). Discoveries from Bible Times: Archaeological Treasures Throw Light on the Bible. Lion. ISBN 978-0-7459-3740-3..
- Mills, Watson E.; Bullard, Roger Aubrey (1990). Mercer Dictionary of the Bible. Mercer University Press. ISBN 978-0-86554-373-7..
- de Miroschedji, Pierre; Sadeq, Moain; Faltings, Dina; Boulez, Virginie; Naggiar-Moliner, Laurence; Sykes, Naomi; Tengberg, Margareta (2001), "Les fouilles de Tell es-Sakan (Gaza): nouvelles données sur les contacts égypto-cananéens aux IVe-IIIe millénaires", Paléorient (in French), 27 (2): 75–104, doi:10.3406/paleo.2001.4732
- de Miroschedji, Pierre; Sadeq, Moain (2008). "Sakan, Tell es-". The New Encyclopedia of Archaeological Excavations in the Holy Land. Vol. 5: Supplementary Volume. Israel Exploration Society/Biblical Archaeology Society (BAS). Archived from the original on 23 June 2024 – via BAS Library.
- Moorey, Peter Roger Stuart (1992). A Century of Biblical Archaeology. Westminster John Knox Press. ISBN 978-0-664-25392-9.
- Murphy-O'Connor, Jerome (1998). "The Holy Land". Oxford University Press.
- Mykytiuk, Lawrence J. (2004). Identifying Biblical Persons in Northwest Semitic Inscriptions of 1200-539. BRILL. ISBN 978-90-04-12724-1..
- Mykytiuk, Lawrence J. (2009). ""Corrections and Updates to 'Identifying Biblical Persons in Northwest Semitic Inscriptions of 1200-539 B.C.E.'" Maarav". 16 (1): 49–132.
- Negev, Avraham; Gibson, Shimon (2001). Archaeological Encyclopedia of the Holy Land. Continuum International Publishing Group. ISBN 978-0-8264-8571-7.
- Philip, Graham; Baird, Douglas (2000). Ceramics and Change in the Early Bronze Age of the Southern Levant. Continuum International Publishing Group. ISBN 978-1-84127-135-4.
- Rast, Walter E. (1992). Through the Ages in Palestinian Archaeology: An Introductory Handbook. Continuum International Publishing Group. ISBN 978-1-56338-055-6.
- Richards, Suzanne (2008). Deborah Pearsall (ed.). ""Archaeology of the Near East: The Levant" in Encyclopedia of Archaeology". Elsevier: 834–848.
- Ross, Marc Howard (2007). Cultural Contestation in Ethnic Conflict. Cambridge University Press. ISBN 978-0-521-87013-9.
- Ryan, Donald (2003). "Complete Idiot's Guide to the World of the Bible". Alpha Books.
- Sass, Benjamin; Uehlinger, Christoph (1993). Studies in the Iconography of Northwest Semitic Inscribed Seals. Vandenhoeck & Ruprecht. ISBN 978-3-525-53760-2..
- Shanks, Hershel; Mazar, Benjamin (1985). Recent Archaeology in the Land of Israel. Biblical Archaeology Society. ISBN 978-0-9613089-2-6.
- Silberman, Neil Asher, ed. (1997). The Archaeology of Israel: Constructing the Past, Interpreting the Present. Sheffield Academic Press. ISBN 978-1-85075-650-7.
- Thompson, Thomas L. (2000). Early History of the Israelite People: From the Written & Archaeological Sources. BRILL. ISBN 978-90-04-11943-7.
- Wolff, Samuel R. (2001). "Studies in the archaeology of Israel and neighboring lands in memory of Douglas L. Esse". Oriental Institute of the University of Chicago.
- Wedgeworth, Robert (1993). World Encyclopedia of Library and Information Services. ALA Editions. ISBN 978-0-8389-0609-5.
