= Siegfried Horn =

German archaeologist (1908–1993)

Siegfried H. Horn
- Born: March 17, 1908; Wurzen, Saxony, Germany
- Died: November 28, 1993 (aged 85)
- Occupations: Protestant, Seventh-day Adventist archaeologist

Siegfried Herbert Horn (March 17, 1908 – November 28, 1993) was a Seventh-day Adventist archaeologist and Bible scholar. He is best known for his excavations at Heshbon in Jordan and Shechem in the West Bank. He was Professor of History of Antiquity at the Seventh-day Adventist Theological Seminary in Berrien Springs, Michigan (now part of Andrews University). The Siegfried H. Horn Museum at Andrews University was named in his honor. An educator of wide-ranging interests and abilities, his areas of specialty were Ancient Near Eastern chronology and archaeology.

== Biography ==
Horn was born March 17, 1908, to Albin and Klara Horn in Wurzen, Saxony, Germany. His father was one of the world's earliest aviators, trained as a pilot by Louis Blériot. Horn served as a minister and as a missionary from 1930 to 1940, first in the Netherlands and then in the Dutch East Indies. Because he was German, Horn spent six and a half years as a prisoner of war during World War II, from 1940 to 1946, first as a prisoner of the Dutch in Indonesia and then imprisoned by the English in India. Granted access to books, Horn made use of this time to develop his skills in Greek and Hebrew and to teach his fellow inmates. Upon gaining his freedom at the end of World War II, Horn immigrated to the United States and completed his education. He earned a B.A. at Walla Walla College (now a University) in Washington State (1947), an M.A. at the Seventh-day Adventist Theological Seminary in Washington, D.C. (1948), and a Ph.D. in Egyptology at the Oriental Institute of the University of Chicago (1951). He studied briefly under William F. Albright at Johns Hopkins University.

Horn taught at the Adventist Theological Seminary from 1951 to 1976. He started an archaeological museum (later named for him), was the founding editor of the journal Andrews University Seminary Studies, and started up the Seminary's doctoral programs. Horn also initiated and directed the Heshbon expedition, an archaeological dig at Tell Hesban thought to be the location of Biblical Heshbon. The dig at Hesban eventually developed into the Madaba Plains Project, with excavations at Hesban, Umayri, and Jalul. Horn also dug at Tell Balatah, biblical Shechem, in the early 1960s. Horn died of lymphoma on November 28, 1993, in St. Helena, California, at the age of 85.
