= Berkut =

Berkut may refer to:

- Asian golden eagle or berkut, a bird of prey
- Berkut (special police force), the former special units of the Ukrainian police and current units of the Russian Crimean police
- The Berkut, a 1987 novel by Joseph Heywood
- S-25 Berkut, a Russian surface-to-air missile system known to NATO as the SA-1 Guild
- Su-47 Berkut, a Russian experimental supersonic jet fighter developed by Sukhoi
- Berkut, a radar reported to be used on the Il-38 and Tu-142 aircraft for antisubmarine warfare
- Berkut 360, a US home-built delta wing canard aircraft of composite construction
- Berkut Air, an airline based in Almaty, Kazakhstan
- Berkut rifle, a semi-automatic hunting rifle designed and manufactured in Russia
- Berkut spacesuit, a Soviet space suit developed in 1964–1965
- Kresta I-class cruiser or Berkut, a surface warfare guided missile cruiser
- Kresta II-class cruiser or Berkut, an anti-submarine guided missile cruiser
- Berkut Group, a fictional organization in Bionic Woman
- Berkut, Russian oil platform in the Okhotsk Sea
- Berkut, a Russian helicopter
- HC Berkut, a Ukrainian professional ice hockey team
- HC Berkut-Kyiv, a Ukrainian ice hockey team from 1997 to 2002
- Berkut Stadium, a football stadium
- Berkut, an antagonist from Fire Emblem Echoes: Shadows of Valentia

== People with the surname ==
- Arthur Berkut (born 1962), Russian singer
- Nataliya Berkut (born 1975), Ukrainian long-distance runner

== See also ==
- Golden Eagle (disambiguation)
