= Larry Geraty =

American academic, second President of La Sierra University

Lawrence T. Geraty

2nd President of La Sierra University
- In office 1993–2007
- Preceded by: Fritz Guy
- Succeeded by: Randal Wisbey

President of Atlantic Union College
- In office 1985–1993

Personal details
- Born: 1940
- Education: Pacific Union College; Adventist Theological Seminary; Harvard University
- Profession: Professor; College administrator

Lawrence "Larry" T. Geraty (born 1940) is an American academic who served as the second President of La Sierra University in Riverside, California. He completed his undergraduate education in theology at Pacific Union College, his bachelor of divinity and master of arts in religion from Andrews University, and received a doctorate in biblical studies from Harvard University.

Prior to his presidency at La Sierra University, Geraty was president of the now defunct Atlantic Union College. He has also served as president of the American Schools of Oriental Research organization. He also taught archaeology and religion at Andrews University.

In 2007 he was recognized as "Citizen of the Year" by the local Chamber of Commerce in his adopted town of Riverside, California. He was also honored in a speech by Rep. Ken Calvert in the U.S. House of Representatives.

== Family and early life ==
Geraty was born to missionary parents in 1940. With his family he lived in China, Burma, Hong Kong, Lebanon, England, Germany, France and Israel. His family also lived in the United States in California, Maryland, Michigan and Massachusetts.

== Higher education ==
Geraty attended Pacific Union College (PUC) for his undergraduate degree in theology, which he received in 1962. During his college years he spent time at Le Campus Adventiste du Salève in Collonges-sous-Saleve, France, and Newbold College, then known as Newbold Missionary College, in Binfield, Berkshire, England. In August 1963 Geraty graduated with a Masters of Arts in Religion and completed his Bachelor of Divinity in May 1965, both at Andrews University. From 1966 to 1972 he undertook his PhD in Syro-Palestinian Archaeology with minor fields in Aramaic, Syriac, classical Hebrew, Northwest Semitic philology, and Old Testament history at Harvard University. He studied under George Ernest Wright and Frank Moore Cross. During the summer of 1970, while a graduate student at Harvard, Geraty studied at Hebrew University in Jordan on a Fulbright Scholarship.

== Career ==
=== Andrews University ===
In 1971 he joined the Old Testament faculty at the University's Seminary, along with S. H. Horn, Gerhard Hasel, A. F. Johns, and Mrs. Leona G. Running.

=== Archaeologist ===
In 1968 he joined Siegfried Horn and Roger Boraas at Tel Hisban. Geraty served the first three seasons there as a field supervisor. In 1974 he became director of the Hisban Expedition, which culminated with a final season in 1976. In 1982 Larry Herr, Øystein LaBianca, and Geraty began the Madaba Plains Project. In 1986 he was instrumental in forming the Archeological Consortium of Adventist Colleges when he led a tour of students from the member schools to the Madaba Plains Project dig, including the 'Umayri site.

He is a long-time member of the American Schools of Oriental Research (ASOR) at Boston University. He became the organization's vice-president in 1982 and was selected as its president on November 16, 2001.

=== Atlantic Union College ===
Dr. Geraty was president of the now defunct Atlantic Union College in South Lancaster, Massachusetts, from 1985 until 1993. It was here he earned a reputation as a progressive academic administrator.

=== La Sierra University ===
From 1993 to 2007 Geraty served as President of La Sierra University. His presidency commenced directly following La Sierra's reformation as an independent institution, after it split from Loma Linda University. His immediate role was to create an identity for the school. Geraty is credited with leading the school as it retired its debt and opened a new $23 million science complex.

He was noted for his leadership in supporting the ordination of women in the Seventh-day Adventist church, with a prominent advocate saying he was not "afraid to stand alone for truth" in that regard. Responding to President Geraty's initiative La Sierra University's board of trustees voted in November 1996 to establish the first Women's Resource Center in the Seventh-day Adventist Church. Geraty serves on the Center's Board of Advisors to this day. On June 7, 2007, Geraty was honored as the Greater Riverside Chambers of Commerce's Citizen of the Year at a celebration dinner.

=== Awards ===
- 1970 – Fulbright Fellow.
- 2001 – Awarded the P. E. MacAllister Field Award for his "outstanding career" as a builder of archaeologists and archaeological teams. It noted that he promoted cutting-edge research among his students and colleagues and his work as a statesman in representing the interests of American Schools for Oriental Research archaeologists to the broader public.
- 2002–2005 – President of American Schools for Oriental Research (ASOR). Responsible for oversight of relationships with the institutes in Jerusalem, Amman, and Nicosia, as well as contacts with other professional organizations concerned with archaeology in the Middle East. The award cited his direction of a major archaeological expedition in Jordan, his presidency of a university, his accomplishments as a scholar and leader, and the respect of his colleagues for his non-controversial and diplomatic personality.
- 2007 – Greater Riverside Chamber of Commerce's Citizen of the Year.
- 2007 – Honored in speech on the floor of the U.S. House of Representatives by Rep. Ken Calvert.

== Academic publications ==
Books

- Historical Foundations: Studies of Literary References to Hesban by Lawrence T. Geraty (ed.), Leona Glidden Running (ed.) (June 1989)
- L. T. Geraty and L. G. Herr, (eds.) (1986) The Archaeology of Jordan and Other Studies. Berrien Springs, MI: Andrews University Press.

Early Christianity Studies

- Lawrence T. Geraty (1965). "The Pascha and the Origin of Sunday Observance" (PDF). Archived from the original (PDF) on April 5, 2012. (1.64 MB) Andrews University Seminary Studies, Vol. 3, No. 2, July, 1965

Education

- "Reclaiming the Vision of Adventist Education Journal of Adventist Education, 1990" (PDF). (292 KB)
- "Academic Excellence, An Adventist Priority Journal of Adventist Education, Dec. 2002, Jan. 2003" (PDF). (288 KB)
- "A Look at the Board of One Adventist University Journal of Adventist Education, 2004" (PDF). (222 KB)
- "The Essential Characteristics of SDA Higher Education. Presented at the 12th Institute of Christian Teaching. 1993". Archived from the original on September 3, 2011.
- Osborn, Richard; Bietz, Gordon and Geraty, Lawrence. "What Adventist Colleges are Looking for in Academy Graduates" (PDF). (204 KB) Journal of Adventist Education, Summer, 2007

Archaeology Reports

- Madaba Plains Project Publication Series, 1984–1994
- Preliminary Report of the 1996 Season of the Madaba Plains Project: Regional Survey, Tall Al-'Umayri and Tall Jalul Excavations
- Report on the 1996 Field Season of the Madaba Plains Project
- Hesban After 25 Years. by Heshbon Expedition Symposium, et al. (April 1994)
- Madaba Plains Project: The 1984 Season at Tell El-Umeiri and Vicinity and Subsequent Studies Madaba Plains Project Series; 1) by Lawrence T. Geraty (ed.) (June 1989)
- Madaba Plains Project: The 1989 Season at Tell El-`Umeiri and Vicinity and Subsequent Studies(Madaba Plains Project Series) by Larry G. Herr (ed.), et al. (April 1997)
- Heshbon 1976: The Fifth Campaign at Tell Hesban : A Preliminary Report by Roger S. Boraas, Lawrence T. Geraty (June 1978)
- Heshbon 1974: The Fourth Campaign at Tell Hesban : A Preliminary Report by Roger S. Boraas, Lawrence T. Geraty (June 1976)

== Non academic publications ==
- Geraty, L.T. (December 1982). "Beyond fundamentalism: A short history of Adventist Old Testament scholarship" (PDF). Spectrum. 13 (2). Takoma Park, MD: Association of Adventist Forums: 44–50. Archived from the original (PDF) on August 17, 2011.
- "The Genesis Genealogies as an Index of Time Spectrum Magazine, 1974, No. 1 and 2" (PDF). Archived from the original (PDF) on April 1, 2012. (732 KB)
- "Following Truth Wherever It Leads, Adventist Today, July, 1994" (PDF). Archived from the original (PDF) on December 9, 2010.
- God's Hand in My Life. January 1977 / 0812701518

== See also ==
- Seventh-day Adventist Church
- History of the Seventh-day Adventist Church
- Ellen G. White
- Adventist
