= Oystein S. LaBianca =

Oystein Sakala LaBianca (born in 1949 in Kristiansand, Norway) is a National Geographic Explorer and director of the Hisban Cultural Heritage Project at Tall Hisban (biblical Heshbon) in Jordan. He is notable for having introduced new interpretive tools (analytical lenses) for studying long-term processes of cultural production and change in the Eastern Mediterranean and for pioneering community archaeology in the region.

== Education ==
LaBianca was raised in Norway and immigrated to the United States as a teenager. He attended Andrews University for his undergraduate degrees in behavioral sciences and religion, which he received in 1971. He continued his education completing an M.A. in Anthropology at Loma Linda University in 1975, and a Ph.D. in Anthropology at Brandeis University in 1987.

== Career ==
LaBianca served as an anthropologist and faunal analyst on the original Heshbon Expedition and was a founding member of the Madaba Plains Project. He has served as a trustee and vice president of the American Society of Overseas Research and as a trustee of the American Center for Research in Amman. Since 1980, he has been a professor at the School of Social and Behavioral Sciences and the Institute of Archaeology at Andrews University. He is also a visiting fellow at the Oxford Centre for Global History.

== Food systems research ==
LaBianca is known for his application of the food systems research perspective at Tall Hisban, Jordan. The food systems model opened a more inclusive and integrative approach to interpreting discoveries from all historical periods at Tall Hisban. The approach explores how the various activities carried out by a group of people in their quest for food, water and security are systemically interrelated as they unfold over time. Study of animal bone fragments and other artifacts from Tall Hisban allowed documentation of long-term cycles of intensification and abatement in the local food system, which in turn were accompanied by cyclic episodes of sedentarization and nomadization. The intensification-abatement framework has since been adopted by researchers studying long-term historical changes elsewhere in Jordan, in the Late Antique Southern Levant, the Mediterranean, and Europe.

== Great and Little Traditions ==
The Great and Little Traditions framework was originally proposed by University of Chicago anthropologist Robert Redfield to study the two-way interactions of expanding imperial civilizations (Great Traditions) with the ways and traditions of the local communities (Little Traditions) they sought to “civilize.” The framework has been widely used by LaBianca to the study of long-term interactions between imperial civilizations of the Ancient Near East with local communities of Jordan. It has since been adopted by other researchers in the region.

== Endemic polycentrism ==
LaBianca has argued that the late arrival of bureaucracy, monumentality and writing in the Southern Levant (when compared with Egypt and Mesopotamia) is attributable to the centrifugal force exerted by persistent tribalism that bends social order in the region in the direction of multiple centers of power (endemic polycentrism). When monarchical social orders arise in the region, they tend therefore to be highly influenced by sentiments and practices rooted in tribalism. This is the rationale behind the tribal kingdom hypothesis as the basis for understanding the nature of secondary states that arose during the Iron Age in the Southern Levant such as the Ammonites, Israelites, Moabites and Edomites.
