= Madaba Plains Project =

Archaeological project

The Madaba Plains Project, or MPP, was founded by veterans of the Heshbon Expedition to continue archaeological survey and excavations research in the hills and plains between Amman and Madaba. MPP is notable for its longevity and influence on archaeology in Jordan. An estimated 2,000 plus students, volunteers and professors have participated in MPP's projects over the past fifty years and MPP is considered Jordan's longest ongoing archaeological project.

== Founding members and sponsoring institutions ==
The partnership was organized between 1980 and 1981 at Andrews University during a year-long National Endowment for the Humanities-sponsored workshop devoted to planning the final publication series of the Heshbon Expedition. The initial founders of the group were Lawrence T. Geraty, Oystein S. LaBianca, and Larry Herr. The three started and directed the MPP's first project outside Tall Hisban, Tall al-Umayri, south of Amman. Douglas Clark joined the leadership team in 1982, and Walla Walla College became a sponsoring institution of the work at Tall al-Umayri.

Randall Younker joined the project in 1990 and expanded MPP to include excavations at Tall Jalul, east of Madaba. Larry Geraty became president of La Sierra University in 1993, and the university joined Andrews and Walla Walla as an institutional sponsor of the Madaba Plains Project.

== Research focus ==
The formation of MPP was a significant evolution in the research agendas of the veterans of the Heshbon Expedition. While the prior Heshbon Expedition primarily endeavored to expand knowledge of biblical and classical periods, MPP aimed to further understand the Islamic and recent archaeological records as well. The choice of Tall al-Umayri and Tall Jalul for archaeological work allowed the teams to work in the Bronze and Iron Age contexts they were best prepared for academically.

== Tall al-Umayri and Tall Jalul ==
Tall al-Umayri proved to be a very productive site, significantly expanding understanding of the Bronze and Iron Ages in Jordan. The later excavations at Tall Jalul found an Iron Age site with notable Islamic and Late Ottoman overlay.

== Continuing excavation at Tall Hisban ==
Explorations at Tall Hisban under the MPP umbrella restarted in 1996. The new expedition shifted focus to periods of “low-intensity settlement,” using the Ottoman Era (1600–1900 AD) as a window on these periods. Research by Bethany Walker also expanded on the abundant, but still poorly understood, Early and Middle Islamic history and material culture.

The legacy of the original Heshbon Expedition had a significant influence on projects under the MPP umbrella. Many of the leadership team have stayed with the project for decades. The project continued to standardize techniques for excavation and recording data and has been at the forefront of adopting new technologies, including ground-penetrating radar, photogrammetry, and drone-assisted photography.

== Hinterland Survey ==
A new level of statistical comparability of the hinterlands of Tall Hisban, Tall al-Umayri, and Tall Jalul was achieved by completing a random square survey in the region within 5 km of eh site—all findings recorded utilizing Arch-Info GIS software.

== Ethnoarchaeology and community archaeology ==
Ethnoarchaeology has been a consistent priority of MPP, notably at Tall Hisban. The project has also contributed significantly to developing community archaeology, working with the local community under the direction of Maria Elena Ronza to develop Hisban into an archaeological park.

== Publications ==
In addition to regular preliminary reports in various journals, final reports have been published on a steady basis reporting on findings from Hisban and Tall al-Umayri. A total of 20 volumes have been released so far.
