= Joseph Heywood =

Joseph Heywood may refer to:

- Joseph L. Heywood (1815–1910), local leader of the Church of Jesus Christ of Latter-day Saints and founder of Nephi, Utah
- Joseph Lee Heywood (1837–1876), acting cashier at the First National Bank of Northfield, Minnesota, when the James-Younger Gang attempted to rob the bank
- Joseph Heywood, American author of the novel The Berkut
