= Golden Eagle Award =

Golden Eagle Award may refer to:

- Golden Eagle Award (Russia), accolade by the National Academy of Motion Pictures Arts and Sciences of Russia
- China TV Golden Eagle Award, main TV awards in China
- CINE Golden Eagle Award, award for American non-theatrical film and video productions
- Filmörnen (Golden Eagle Award), first prize in the Swedish short film festival Filmörnen
- Golden Eagle Award, a statuette presented to winners at the San Diego International Film Festival
