= Atocha Star Emerald =

400-year-old emerald

Close view of the Atocha Star emerald

The Golden Eagle standing watch over the Atocha Star emerald

The Atocha Star is a 400-year-old emerald, weighing more than 25.87 carats (5.174 g) before being cut to 12.72 carats (2.544 g). The emerald is estimated to be worth between $3.2 and $5 million (USD). It was part of the treasure on board the ship Nuestra Señora de Atocha, also referred to as the Atocha. The Atocha was the largest Spanish treasure galleon in a fleet of twenty-eight ships bound for Spain which sank along with seven others in a hurricane on September 6, 1622. It sank with the Atocha Star emerald, the highest graded emerald of all Atocha Emeralds.

== History ==
Mel and Deo Fisher searched for the Atocha for 16 years and in 1985 found the mother lode worth more than $400 million US (approximately 1/2 of the treasure listed on the manifest). They discovered "Emerald City" about 100 feet (30 m) from the "main pile" of the Atocha. Emerald City yielded 13,500 carats of emeralds that were originally mined at Muzo, Colombia.

The "Atocha Star" emerald was graded as 1AA with an uncut weight of 25.87 carats. It was chosen by Mel Fisher as a gift to Deo Fisher, his wife. The emerald was selected based on its size, brilliant color, and quality.

Generally, artifacts of this kind are not altered because of their historical significance; however, as a gift for Deo Fisher, in 1992 the emerald was cut down to 12.72 carats, making it one of the largest and the only named cut emerald from the Atocha.

The Atocha Star is currently mounted between the claws of an 18 pounds (8.2 kg) solid gold statue of an eagle, known as The Golden Eagle or The Maltese Eagle.

== Theft ==
On May 30, 2016, the Golden Eagle on which the Atocha Star Emerald is mounted, was stolen from its owner Ron Shore, in Vancouver, British Columbia. The heist occurred in the 4700 block of 57th street while it was being loaded into a vehicle. The statue had been on display for four days at the Art Vancouver exhibit and has still not been located. Delta Police are asking if anybody hears anything or happens to see this statue for sale somewhere that they contact Delta Police.

== See also ==
- The Golden Eagle
- Colombian emeralds
- Muzo
