= Gold Eagle =

Gold Eagle may refer to:

- Eagle (United States coin) (1792–1933)
- American Gold Eagle, a modern bullion coin
- Gold Eagle Reserve, an Indian reserve in Saskatchewan, Canada
- Gold Eagle, a publishing imprint of Harlequin Enterprises

== See also ==
- Golden Eagle (disambiguation)
