= Jalul =

- Location in Jordan
- Coordinates: 31°43′0″N 35°51′0″E
- Country: Jordan
- Governorate: Amman Governorate
- Time zone: UTC + 2

Jalul is an archaeological site and small village in the Amman Governorate in northwestern Jordan.

== Archaeology ==
The site of Tell Jalul spans 18 acres and is the largest tell (archaeological mound) in the central Jordanian plateau region. It is located 5 kilometers (3.1 mi) east of the city of Madaba and west of the Queen Alia International Airport. The tell is oblong in shape and measures about 300 by 240 meters (980 ft × 790 ft).

=== Reports and surveys ===
Ruins at Jalul were reported by several 19th-century explorers. Jalul was mentioned as a ruined site north of Madaba by the German explorer Ulrich Seetzen during his 1805–1807 explorations in Transjordan. It was also mentioned in passing by the Swiss explorer Johann Ludwig Burckhardt in 1812. Jalul was described by the English traveler James Silk Buckingham during his visits to the area in 1816. He reported that it was the largest site he had seen in Transjordan after Amman and that Jalul occupied a commanding position on "the brow of an elevated ridge of the land, and looking over an extensive space to the south of it, of a lower level than the great plain by which we had approached this spot from the north". Buckingham noted that the site was divided by an area empty of structure into eastern and western sections containing numerous ruins mostly characterized by columns, piles of large hewn stones and a few cisterns, grottoes, tombs, and sarcophagi "exhibiting a melancholy example of the wreck of former opulence and power".

Jalul began to be shown on maps in 1856 where it was erroneously placed on Kiepert's map of Palestine 6 kilometers (3.7 mi) northwest of Madaba, and in 1867 by Charles Warren who correctly placed it on his reconnaissance map of the Jordan Valley. Henry Baker Tristram noted in 1872 that Jalul was "a small ruin, apparently of a fort and a village". Further mentions and descriptions of Jalul were made by Gottlieb Schumacher in 1891 and Alois Musil in 1896. Jalul was surveyed in 1976 by the American archaeologist Robert Ibach during work at the sites of Tell Hisban and Tall al-Umayri by a team from the Madaba Plains Project and Andrews University. He noted that it was "a major site" of ruins, including "walls preserved above the door lintels and arches still intact".

=== Excavations ===
Excavations of the site by Andrews University's Madaba Plains Project began in 1992 after permission was granted by Jordan's Department of Antiquities after an earlier attempt in 1984 was rejected due to local security concerns. At the time the tell (archaeological mound) upon which Jalul was built was owned by Acash az-Zaben, who ceded the land rights of the site to the Jordanian government.

== Modern village ==
Jalul was mentioned by Antonin Jaussen as one of nine Bedouin plantation villages in the kaza (district) of Salt in May 1883. Circa 1900 it was acquired along with the sites of Huwwarah, Umm Qusayr and Natil by the Zaben clan of the large Bedouin Beni Sakhr tribe for cultivation. This may have been in relation to the acquisition of about fifteen khirbas (ruined villages) tilled by fellahin on behalf of the sites' Bedouin owners by the paramount leader of the Beni Sakhr, Sattam Al-Fayez, from his father-in-law Ali Dhiyab, the paramount leader of the Bedouin Adwan tribe, which traditionally dominated the Balqa region in which Jalul was located. As of 2009 new homes of the village of Jalul occupied the area immediately west of the tell (archaeological mound), while a grove of olives and a private home were located east of the tell.

== Bibliography ==
- Abujaber, Raouf (1999). "Jaussen's Contribution to the Study of Agricultural Development in Moab and Southern Palestine around 1900". In Chatelard, Géraldine; Tarawneh, Mohammed (eds.). Antonin Jaussen, sciences sociales occidentales et patrimoine arabe. Beirut: Presses de l'Ifpo. pp. 139–144. ISBN 9782351595039.
- Al-Shqour, Reem (2009). "Jalul Islamic Village Excavation". Munjazat. 10: 88–93.
- Rogan, Eugene L. (1994). "Bringing the State Back: The Limits of Ottoman Rule in Jordan, 1840–1910". In Rogan, Eugene L.; Tell, Tariq (eds.). Village, Steppe and State: The Social Origins of Modern Jordan. London: British Academic Press. p. 47, note 41. ISBN 1-85043-829-3.
- Younker, Randall W.; Gane, Constance Clark; Al-Shqour, Reem (2014) [2011]. "Excavations at Tall Jalul". In Clark, Douglas R.; Herr, Larry G.; LaBianca, Oystein S.; Younker, Randall W. (eds.). The Madaba Plains Project: Forty Years of Archaeological Research into Jordan's Past. Abingdon, Oxon and New York: Routledge. ISBN 978-1-84553-514-8.
