= Tall Jawa =

Archaeological sites in central Jordan

- Location within Jordan
- 31.857470°N 35.931608°E
- Cultures: Ammonite, Byzantine, Umayyad
- Location: Jordan
- Region: Amman Governorate

Tall Jawa is an archaeological and historical site in central Jordan.

Excavations and research have revealed the remains of an Iron Age village of the ancient Kingdom of Ammon. A two-storey house of the early Islamic period was also found, providing insight of the 7th to 8th century transition from Christianity to Islam in Central Transjordan.

Today, Tall Jawa stands as a tell — a mound of ruins — overlooking the Madaba Plain. Amongst local people, it is known as "The Rock", but its ancient name is unknown.

== Location ==
Tall Jawa stands at an elevation of 928 metres (3,045 ft) above sea level, close to the Iron Age capital city of Rabbath-Ammon. It is located west-northwest of the modern city of Jawa, 10.9 kilometres (6.8 mi) south of modern Amman.

== History ==
Tall Jawa was known to 19th-century travellers and explorers. Nelson Glueck conducted the first archaeological survey on site in 1933 and modern day excavations commenced in 1989. No other research is known to have taken place between Glueck's survey and the start of modern excavations. Tall Jawa underwent six seasons of research and excavations, first as part of the Madaba Plains Project and, after 1992, as the Tall Jawa excavation Project. Lawrence T. Geraty (Project Director, Madaba Plains Project) was in charge of the excavations in 1989 and 1991 and Michèle Daviau oversaw them from 1992 to 1995.

Archaeological finds, including architecture and artefacts dating from the Iron Age (1100–600 BC), have revealed information about the Kingdom of Ammon. Some of the artefacts found on site have been retained by the Department of Antiquities of Jordan for the National Museum in Amman. The remaining objects are either at Wilfrid Laurier University or in storage at the American Center for Oriental Research in Amman.

Archaeological research has revealed that the site was reoccupied 1200 years after the destruction of the Iron Age town, during the transition from the Byzantine to the Umayyad period.

== Archaeological finds ==
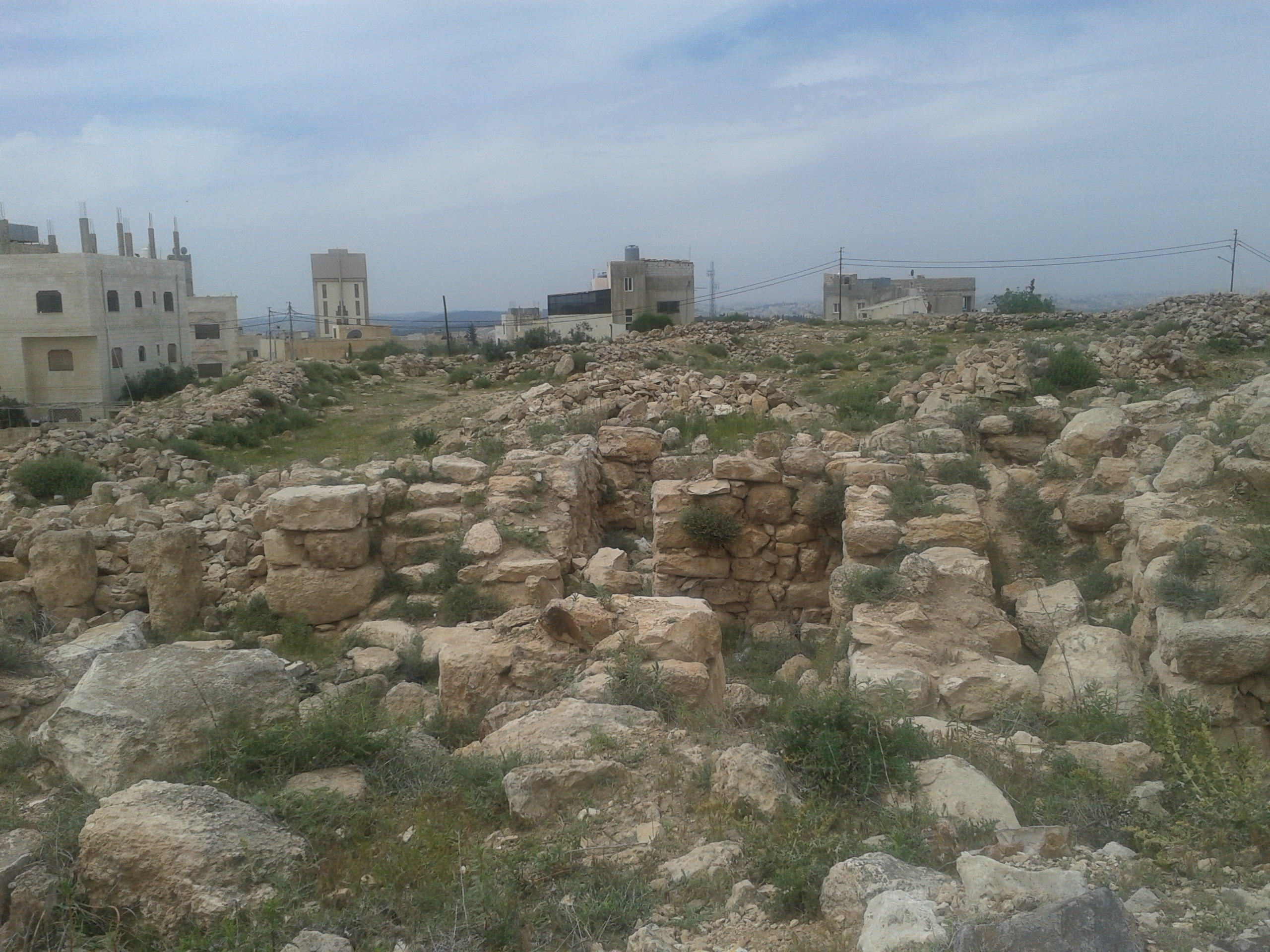
Aspect of the Tall Jawa archaeological site in Jordan

Excavations and research in 1989, 1991 and 1992–95, uncovered Iron Age settlements at Tall Jawa dating from 1100 to 600 BC. The earliest settlement on site dates back to the Iron Age I period (1100-900 BC). After the destruction of the Iron Age I village, excavations revealed the existence of a fortification wall and a multi-chambered gate dating to mid-late Iron Age II. The majority of the ceramic material found date primarily to Iron Age II, putting the site within the range of Iron Age II residential towns. Items excavated include artefacts of daily life such as flasks, jars and ground stone tools, jewellery, figurative objects, coins, seals and even marine shells.

The presence of pottery sherds from the Byzantine period suggested the reoccupation of the site during the Late Antique period. Building 600, a two-storey house, was used in the Early Islamic Period and abandoned thereafter. Pottery, mould-made lamps, glass, a small coin hoard and mosaic pavements were amongst the artefacts and architectural elements found in or near the building. Research on this building and the material culture attached to it has made a contribution to our understanding and knowledge of village life during and after the Islamic conquests in Central Transjordan, as well as the overall 7th to 8th century Christian–Islamic transition.

The zenith of Tall Jawa can be traced to during the period of the Assyrian Empire, according to evidence of ceramic artefacts that are more advanced and of higher status compared to others at the site.

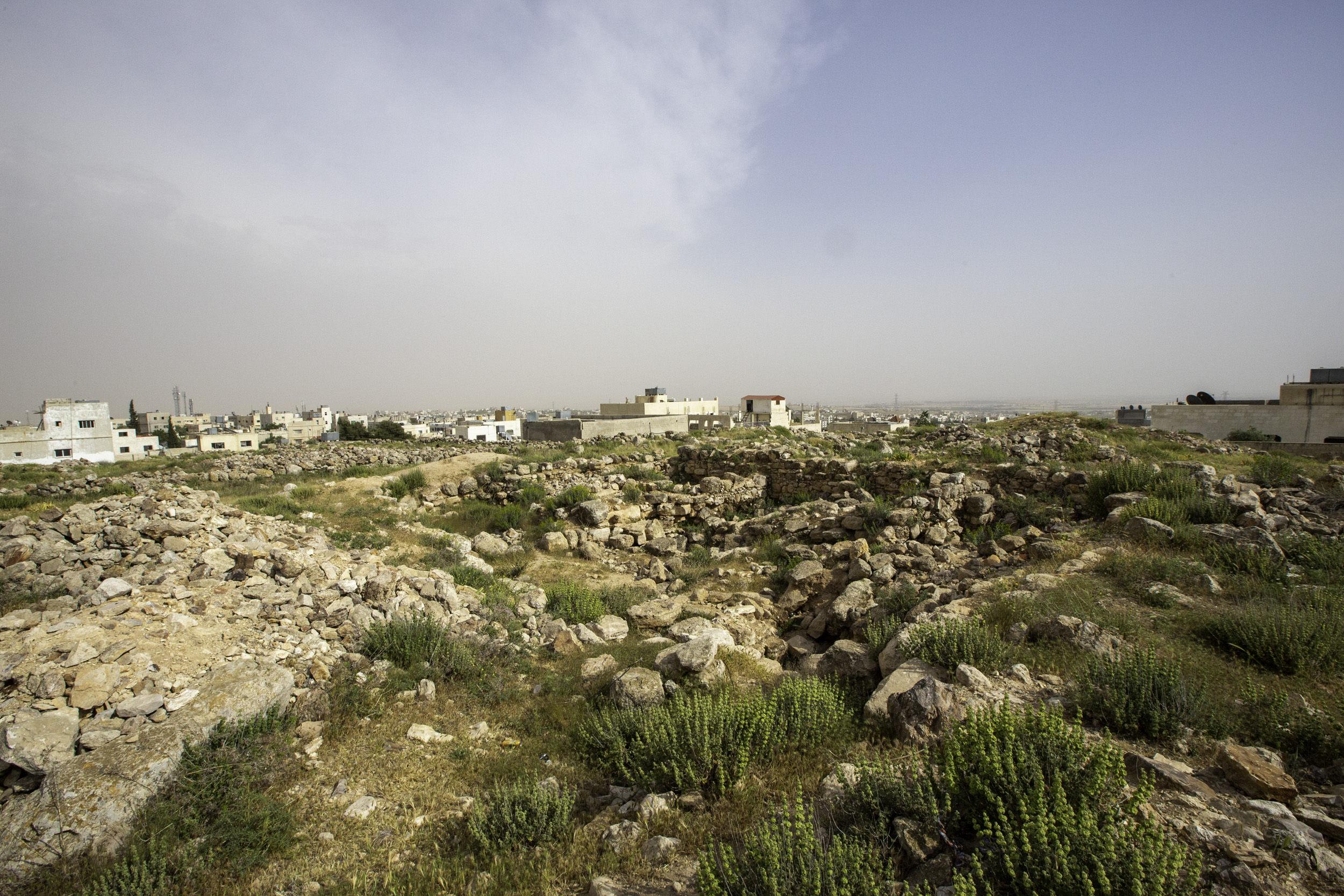
