= Murayghat =

Prehistoric archaeological site in the Madaba region of Jordan

Murayghat is a prehistoric archaeological site in the Madaba region of Jordan primarily dating to the Late Chalcolithic and Early and Middle Bronze Age, with archaeological finds dating between the Neolithic (8000 BCE) and the Islamic Period (1500 CE). The site consists of a number of hills with various archaeological features including dolmens, caves, standing stones, and stone circles. The site has been under investigation as part of the Ritual Landscape of Murayghat Project run by Dr. Susanne Kerner of the University of Copenhagen. The project aims to investigate how ritual practices affect landscapes and the built environment. The project has an accompanying field school for archaeology students and any individuals interested in learning archaeological field research methods.

== Name ==
The site of Al-Murayghât is also known as el-Megheirat, el-Mareighât, and Mugheirat. Its dolmen field, menhirs and megalithic structures have earned it the nickname of "Jordan's Stonehenge".

== Location ==
Murayghat is located in the governorate of Madaba, 3 km south-west of the town of Madaba, tucked into the limestone hills of the Wadi Murayghat near the Ma'in and Wadi Zarqa-Ma'in. The Murayghat landscape is a complex of features stretching over a central knoll. To the north and south are active limestone quarries.

== Research history ==
The first documentary evidence of Murayghat comes from the reports of travelers to the region in the nineteenth century including the "sepulchral monuments" described by Irby and Mangles (1817-1818) and Claude Reignier Conder (1881), the latter describing the site as "El Mareighat ... 'the things smeared,' with oil, or blood or other thick liquid." Other translations of the name refer to a "site to picnic" or a "site to enjoy the view."

In the 1930s a research team from the Pontifical Institute visited the site. The site was later visited by Timothy P. Harrison in the 1990s and Stephen Savage in 1999-2001. The Ritual Landscape of Murayghat Project has been on site since 2014.

== Archaeology ==
The central knoll of that archaeological landscape contains the remnants of stone structures consisting of walls largely composed of orthostats, or upright stones, with accompanying pebble stone surfaces, possibly indicative of building foundation material. These stones are aligned in a horse-shoe shape along with other rectangular features. These were likely used for ritual purposes. The site also contains several dolmens, standing stones, stone circles and caves with possible domestic structures.

=== Dolmens ===
Dolmens are structures made from large stone slabs. The dolmen fields at Murayghat are located around the central knoll along 7 rock platforms. These dolmens are constructed of one floor slab, one or two side slabs on the long slide, a slab on the short side that was often found to be missing, and a capstone. Most of the slabs are smoothed on the inside face and weathered on the outside. These dolmens were most likely used for burials.

=== Standing stones ===
One of the famous features of Murayghat is the standing stone known as the Hajr al-Mansub. Several other standing stones (menhirs) dot the site. These standing stones are often found accompanying the dolmens and stone circles, indicating a ritualistic origin. These stones are thought to date from the Late Chalcolithic or Early Bronze Age with reuse in the Middle Bronze Age.

=== Excavated finds ===
Excavation of Murayghat has discovered some smaller-scale buildings, walls and stone-lined pits most of which have been dated the Early Bronze Age, with some of which are overlain by Middle Bronze Age walls and orthostats. Some of the Bronze Age structures were separated by evidence of a flooding event.

Other findings included stone tools, a possible bone tool, and a number of ceramic vessels, including a many handled bowl which is dated to the Early Bronze Age and can be found at the Madaba Archaeological Museum. The pottery found at the site is so large it implies its use for preparing food for a large number of people and is most likely domestic.

=== Ritual landscape ===
The Early Bronze Age lacked a strong political organisation and archaeologists have therefore proposed that ritual played a large role in daily life. These rituals would have later promoted communication and built cohesion between different classes and societal structures (individuals, families, clans).

The presence of standing stones, dolmens, and possible domestic sites indicates a domestic as well as ritual landscape. The presence of these structures transforms the natural landscape into a cultural landscape.

== Endangered status ==
In the 2000s, the site has been described as in imminent danger of complete destruction due to the rapid expansion of quarrying activity. This is part of a country-wide phenomenon, which has seen the massive decline in the number of dolmens in Jordan. In the 19th century, this was apparently the area with the highest density of dolmens in the Mediterranean region, with western visitors reporting of thousands of dolmens; by 2005 however, there were far less than a thousand surviving in a "fairly intact" state in all of Jordan. The reasons are urban expansion, quarrying, and the mass cultivation of olive trees, which together have caused the destruction of major sites such as Mugheirat, the Damiyah dolmen field (travertine quarry), and Jebel al-Mutawwaq.
