= The Golden Eagle =

Solid gold statue of an eagle

- Artist: Kevin Peters / Ron Shore
- Type: Statue
- Dimensions: 26 cm × 10 cm (10 in × 3.9 in)
- Owner: Forgotten Treasure Ltd

The Golden Eagle or The Maltese Eagle is a solid gold statue of an eagle, which is thought to be the largest solid gold and diamond encrusted statue created. An appraisal by GLS GEMLAB Ltd, Abbotsford, BC puts the replacement value at $4,110,450. The current market value is put at $6 million.

== History ==
The Golden Eagle was originally created as the theme for the book The World's Greatest Treasure Hunt: Quest for the Golden Eagle, a work by Ron Shore to help raise $25 million to fund research for the prevention, early detection and cure for breast cancer. Ron Shore commissioned Canadian sculptor Kevin Peters to help create the Golden Eagle. It took more than 4000 hours to complete.

The statue was for sale, with a price tag of $5 million. $1 million from the sale will be given to the breast cancer charity of the buyer's choice, $1 million will be given to the winner of The World's Greatest Treasure Hunt, while the remaining sum is to be used to promote The World's Greatest Treasure Hunt to raise additional funds for breast cancer research.

Participants in The World's Greatest Treasure Hunt win "The Grand Prize", $1,000,000 in cash by solving clues hidden in the book, The World's Greatest Treasure Hunt: Quest for the Golden Eagle, written by Ron Shore.

== Description ==
The Golden Eagle contains 18 pounds of solid gold. The head is made of 18 carat white gold and encrusted with 763 diamonds; and the eyes are made of two 1.1 carat matching pear shaped diamonds. The Eagle stands watch over the Atocha Star emerald, a 12.72 carat emerald valued at $3.18 million in 2013. The tail feathers are 14 kt white gold; the body, rock and base are 14 kt yellow gold, and the very bottom pedestal is 10 kt yellow gold.

The statue is approximately 26 by 10 cm (10 by 4 in) in dimension.

According to Science World British Columbia, the Golden Eagle was designed to be "a treasure that invoked the Old World craftsmanship of the Fabergé egg". The Vancouver is Awesome recognized that the design is "with a hint of Damien Hirst’s skull".

== Theft ==
On May 30, 2016 Ron Shore, who was in possession of the statue, was mugged as he walked to his car after a concert. The perpetrator reportedly fled with Mr. Shore's backpack which contained the statue inside.

== Insurance Denial ==
On December 1, 2020 an article in the Vancouver Sun newspaper reports Lloyd’s of London Insurance has denied his claim for the theft of the bird.

== See also ==
- Atocha Star Emerald
