= PS Golden Eagle =

Clyde-built paddle steamer (1909 - 1951)

History
- Owner: General Steam Navigation Company
- Builder: John Brown & Company
- Launched: 1909
- Fate: Scrapped

General characteristics
- Tonnage: 793
- Length: 91.5m

The PS Golden Eagle was a paddle steamer built by John Brown & Company at their Clydebank shipyard for General Steam Navigation Company and launched 1909. During the two world wars she served with the Royal Navy. In World War I as a depot ship. This ship was employed by H.M Government as a troop transport and between February 1915 and November 1919 it steamed 32,140 miles and carried 518,101 troops.

In World War II as an auxiliary anti-aircraft vessel. At the outset of World War II, Golden Eagle was one of the ships tasked with evacuating children from London, herself responsible for transporting over 3000 children to Great Yarmouth. During World War II she played an important role in the Dunkirk evacuation rescuing 1,751. Golden Eagle was returned to her owners in 1945, and after being refitted for passenger use, returned to coastal service. By 1951 however Golden Eagle was scrapped.
