= Värmlands Filmförbund =

Filmörnen
- Location: Värmland, Sweden
- Founded: 1975
- Founded by: Erik Fast and Kjell Bergström

Värmlands Filmförbund is a movie organisation in Värmland, Sweden. It was founded in 1975 by Erik Fast and Kjell Bergström.

In 1978, they started a short film festival, Filmörnen (the Golden Eagle Film Festival), named after the eagle in the coat of arms of Värmland. Since 1998, it has been held in the Film i Värmland regional film center. The purpose of the festival is to give local filmmakers in the province of Värmland a public forum for their work. The highest honor awarded is the Filmörnen.

== Filmörnen ==
- 2015 Kry by Ylvaa Johansson
- 2014 Sov gott, min prinsessa by Emelie Hahne and Klara Olsson
- 2013 Mulldjuret by Mikael Lindahl
- 2012 Paper Lake by Juan Antonio Casaus, Simón Lara and Carmen Díaz
- 2011 Hopp by Sofia-Linn Karlsson
- 2010 Vad är jag by Victor Nyåker
- 2009 Grattis John by Stefan Askernäs
- 2008 Drawn to you by Emil Gustafsson Ryderup
- 2007 The art of clowning by Robert Ek
- 2006 Captive by EyeCatcher Entertainment
- 2005 Mein Pater, Mon Major
- 2004 Blind date
- 2003 Chimp to the Monk
- 2002 Izidor
- 2001 Lufthavn
- 2000 Liten, ful, gul
- 1999 Born in Värmland
- 1998 Alexanders värld
- 1997 Nils, en mångsysslare
- 1996 Der spjuver
- 1994 Du äter inte stuvat
- 1993 I skuggan av batongen
- 1992 Historisk blues
- 1991 Kom hem igen
- 1990 Stress
- 1989 Sista hoppet
- 1982 Ombyte förnöjer by Anders Nilsson, Kil
- 1981 To care or not to care
- 1980 Sagan om kalven by Anders Nilsson, Kil
- 1979 Simius
- 1978 Polisuppdraget by The Golden Bird Film Team

=== Best Documentary ===
- 2008 Ellinor Engkvist & Sandra Dahlen for Betina den fina – mannen med hårmössan
- 2007 Natia Ellelund, Frida Oskarsson & Helén Ranelius for Tiden kommer till fingrar
- 2006 Henric Jonsson & Oliver der Nederlanden for De oskrivna reglerna
- 2005 Malena Wall & Amanda Wirtberg for Den himlastormande förälskelsen

=== Best Experimentfilm ===
- 2008 Emil Gustafsson Ryderup for Dissident
- 2007 Karin Gustafsson for Embryo of shadows
- 2006 Trine Hylander Friis for Ut av drömmar
- 2005 Kristoffer Andrén for The Haiku Death Trilogy

=== Best Script ===
- 2008 Jennie Andersson for Sista dagen
- 2007 Kristofer Bernhardtz for Vid första ögonkastet
- 2006 Robin Gjuraj for Kris
- 2005 Mattias Svensson & Jesper Fielding for Kanske till sommaren
- 2004 Ismael Ataria & Tomas Björklund for EvOL

=== Best Music ===
- 2008 Daniel Leppänen for Manuset
- 2007 Johan Ekland for Klasskamp
- 2006 Kultiration for I mitt blod
- 2005 Marcus Granberg & Mattias Svensson for Kanske till sommaren

=== Best Editing ===
- 2008 Tomas Holmberg, Sandra Eklund & Kristian Norta for Manuset
- 2007 Staffan Kvarneke for Paus
- 2006 Tomas Holmberg & Kristian Norta for Den otroliga historien
- 2005 Ola Paulakoski for Werewolf cult Chronicles: Vietnam 1969
- 2004 Ulf Norström & Robert P. Olsson for Old world disorder

=== Best Sound ===
- 2008 Daniel Johansson for Kontakt
- 2007 Johan Ekland for The Art of Clowning
- 2006 Staffan Kvarneke for Hämndens pris and Marcus Sötterman for Fel film
- 2005 Ola Paulakoski for Werewolf cult Crhronicles: Vietnam 1969
- 2004 Ulf Norström for 13:de mars, 1941

=== Best Cinematography ===
- 2008 Markus Helmersson for Drawn to you
- 2007 Veronika Jacobsson & Staffan Kvarneke for Slutna ögon
- 2006 Robin Woo Söderberg for Lev för fan
- 2005 Rasmus Persson for Fingers of Thunder
- 2004 Jimi Wikström for Poweranimal – Hybrid

=== Best Actress ===
- 2008 Danielle Rhodin & Rebecca Höök in Sista dagen, Alive & more
- 2007 Anna Åsdell in Slutna ögon
- 2006 Jennie Andersson in Jakt-Lycka
- 2005 Kristin Ericsson in För Dig
- 2004 Victoria Brattström in Blind date

=== Best Actor ===
- 2008 Peter Jankert in Om ödet får bestämma
- 2007 John Ström Båtelson in The Art of Clowning
- 2006 Daniel Gille in Konsten att mörda
- 2005 Mikael Amehag in Mein Pater, Mon Major
- 2004 Boris Glibusic in Blind date

=== Best Animation ===
- 2007 Karl-Joel Larsson, Mikael Gustafsson, Phim Fransson & Helena Jäger for Edward

=== Audience Award ===
- 2008 Där jag var som tryggast
- 2007 Teddy
- 2005 Kanske till sommaren
