= The Berkut =

1987 novel by Joseph Heywood

- First edition
- Author: Joseph Heywood
- Language: English
- Genre: Secret history, historical thriller
- Publisher: Random House
- Publication date: 1987
- Publication place: United States
- Media type: Print (hardback & paperback)
- Pages: 489 pp
- ISBN: 0-394-56088-4
- OCLC: 14818443
- Dewey Decimal: 813/.54 19
- LC Class: PS3558.E92 B4 1987

The Berkut is a 1987 secret history novel by Joseph Heywood in which Adolf Hitler survives World War II. It is set in the period immediately after the fall of the Third Reich. This book pits a German colonel and a Russian soldier from a secret organization against each other. The German, Günter Brumm, has been given orders to safely get the Führer out of Germany with the remaining resources of the Reich at his disposal, while Vasily Petrov, the Russian, has been given orders by Joseph Stalin to capture Hitler with the full resources of the Soviet Union at his disposal. In essence, Hitler says "Get me out of Germany, alive", while Stalin says, "Get me Hitler, alive." The book explores Brumm and Petrov pursuing their goals.

== Plot introduction ==
A few facts are clearly bent in this narrative: a double, not Hitler, died under the Chancellery. Joseph Stalin orders his top agent to capture Hitler and bring him back to the Kremlin. Hitler, known in the novel as Herr Wolf, escapes across Europe in the company of two SS commandos.

=== Plot ===
In the final days of Nazi Germany, Hitler shelters in his bunker. Adolf Hitler officially commits suicide along with Eva Braun. However, after Eva kills herself, a pre-selected double takes Hitler's place and is disposed of along with Braun in the Chancellery yard for the Russians to find. The real Hitler escapes the bunker along with Colonel Günther Brumm, a German commando officer and together with a rag tag team, escape Berlin. It is also revealed that Hitler never in fact had Parkinson's disease, but was injecting himself with a substance to make his hand tremble and thus give others the appearance that he was a sick man. In reality, Hitler had kept himself in good physical condition and had been planning his escape after the war for nearly a year.

Joseph Stalin meanwhile has intuitively deduced that the psychological make-up of Hitler is not that of a man who would commit suicide. Hence he sets up a special team of five operatives with wide ranging powers to round up Hitler and bring him back for Stalin's personal revenge. The novel soon becomes both a thrilling chase and a ruthless game of cat and mouse. Hitler and his protectors make their way across Germany, a charred wasteland where Hitler's dreams of glory lie in ruins and ashes. After spending some time in a hide-out located within the Harz mountains, Hitler and his protectors set off for Italy (where they have been promised sanctuary) but the Russian team is in hot pursuit.

Along the way, Heywood provides an unforgettable historical snapshot of the aftermath of World War II. It is worth noting that many of the German survivors are depicted as admirable, while Red Army and (especially) United States Army personnel are shown to be either timid, short-sighted, or corrupt. In one particularly chilling sequence, US Army Major Rosemary Wilson, a rich older woman, stumbles upon Waller, the beautiful German girl who is carrying the plans for Hitler's escape. Instead of interrogating the girl or turning her over to the American MPs, Major Wilson insists on renting a room for Waller and taking her to dinner at a small, dimly lit restaurant nearby. Wholly intent upon a classic lesbian seduction, Rosemary Wilson proves no match for the highly disciplined German girl. She drinks far too much at dinner and falls into bed in a state of blissful anticipation, only to be found dead the next morning with an SS dagger buried in her breast.

The Russians ultimately catch Hitler and bring him back to Stalin in Moscow. Hitler is secretly imprisoned in a hanging cage in a sub-basement of the Kremlin which is too small for Hitler to either stand or lie fully. He is fed scraps through the metal bars of the cage and is not allowed toilet facilities. Over the years, Hitler changes to a filthy, senile beast who has his right leg amputated above the knee and his left leg amputated above the ankle as gangrene sets in. He is finally executed by Petrov when Stalin dies in 1953, after which the sub-basement in which Hitler was kept is walled off forever.

== Literary significance and reception ==
The New York Times reviews this novel:

"Joseph Heywood's second novel isn't your run-of-the-mill Nazi-hunting twaddle."
