= La Sierra University =

University in Riverside, California, USA

- Seal of La Sierra University
- Former names: La Sierra Academy (1922–1923); La Sierra Academy and Normal School (1923–1927); Southern California Junior College (1927–1939); La Sierra College (1939–1967); Loma Linda University: La Sierra College of Arts and Sciences (1967–1990)
- Motto: To Seek, To Know, To Serve
- Type: Private university
- Established: 1922
- Religious affiliation: Seventh-day Adventist Church
- Academic affiliations: NAICU; APGA
- Endowment: $35 million
- President: Christon Arthur
- Provost: Leslie Martin
- Students: 1,609
- Undergraduates: 1,259
- Location: Riverside, California, U.S. 33°54′41″N 117°30′06″W
- Campus: Suburban, 150 acres (61 ha)
- Colors: Blue & Gold
- Nickname: Golden Eagles
- Sporting affiliations: NAIA – Cal-Pac
- Mascot: Golden Eagle
- Website: lasierra.edu

La Sierra University (La Sierra or LSU) is a private, Seventh-day Adventist university in Riverside, California. Founded in 1922 as La Sierra Academy, it later became La Sierra College, a liberal arts college, and then was merged into Loma Linda University (LLU) in 1967 and became the Loma Linda University La Sierra College of Arts and Sciences (or better known as La Sierra Campus of LLU). In 1990, the La Sierra Campus separated from Loma Linda University to become La Sierra University, an independent institution. It is accredited by the WASC Senior College and University Commission (WSCUC), the Adventist Accrediting Association (AAA), and several discipline-based accrediting bodies.

Since becoming independent in 1990, La Sierra University has won multiple national and world titles in the Enactus (formerly Students in Free Enterprise) competition. In the late 2000s and early 2010s, controversy arose involving the teaching of evolution in La Sierra's science curriculum. La Sierra was founded in 1922 when the Southeastern California Conference, one of the regional governing bodies of the Adventist church, obtained 300 acres (120 ha) of land in an unincorporated area of Riverside County from Willits J. Hole. The land was once a part of a large Mexican land grant named Rancho La Sierra, giving La Sierra its current name.

== History ==
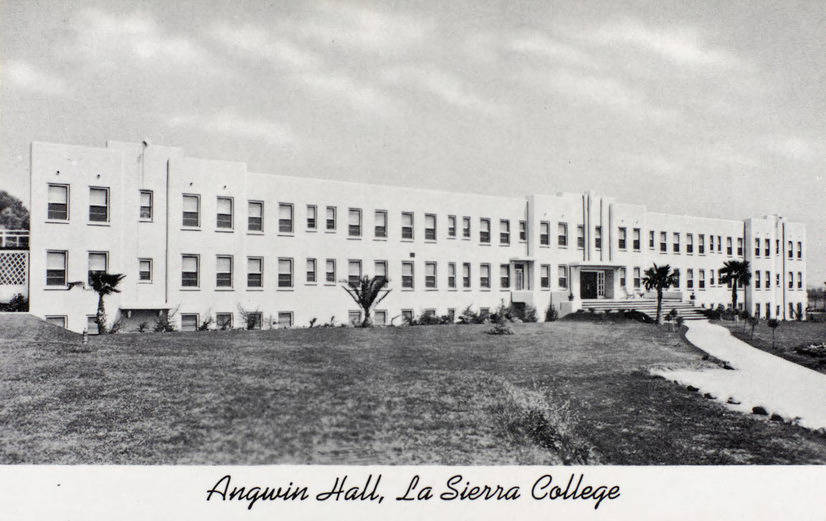
1941 postcard view of Angwin Hall on the campus of La Sierra College

Since its founding in 1922 as La Sierra Academy, La Sierra has morphed through a number of stages. In 1923, the school became known as La Sierra Academy and Normal School when it expanded into offering courses for future teachers. In 1927, after course offerings were expanded, it became known as the Southern California Junior College. In 1939, the school was renamed La Sierra College. In 1940, the high school section split to form La Sierra College Preparatory School. The preparatory school is now named La Sierra Academy and is still located near the university. La Sierra College was first accredited as a four-year liberal arts college in 1946. In 1964 the city of Riverside annexed much of La Sierra lands and nearby Arlington, placing the college within Riverside's city limits.

In 1967, the college merged with LLU, becoming its La Sierra Campus of LLU. Between 1967 and 1990, La Sierra's College of Arts and Sciences, School of Education, School of Business and Management (now the Tom and Vi Zapara School of Business), School of Religion (now the H.M.S.Richards Divinity School), and Division of Continuing Studies were established.

In 1990, the two campuses became two separate institutions, and the La Sierra campus became La Sierra University. La Sierra remains a major feeder school for LLU particularly for its medical programs. After the separation, Fritz Guy became La Sierra University's first president. He was followed by Lawrence T. Geraty in 1993, Randal Wisbey in 2007, and Joy Fehr in 2019.

In 1999, over 20 percent of the student body signed a petition criticizing the university's core curriculum due to its alleged lack of focus on the Bible, politically liberal leanings, and "subversive attacks on Christianity and monotheism".

La Sierra sold approximately 200 acres of its land to a developer in 2000, in what the university described as "the most significant physical change to La Sierra in the institution's 78-year history." The land, which the school formerly used for agriculture and a dairy, became a planned development known as "Riverwalk".

=== Biology curriculum controversy ===
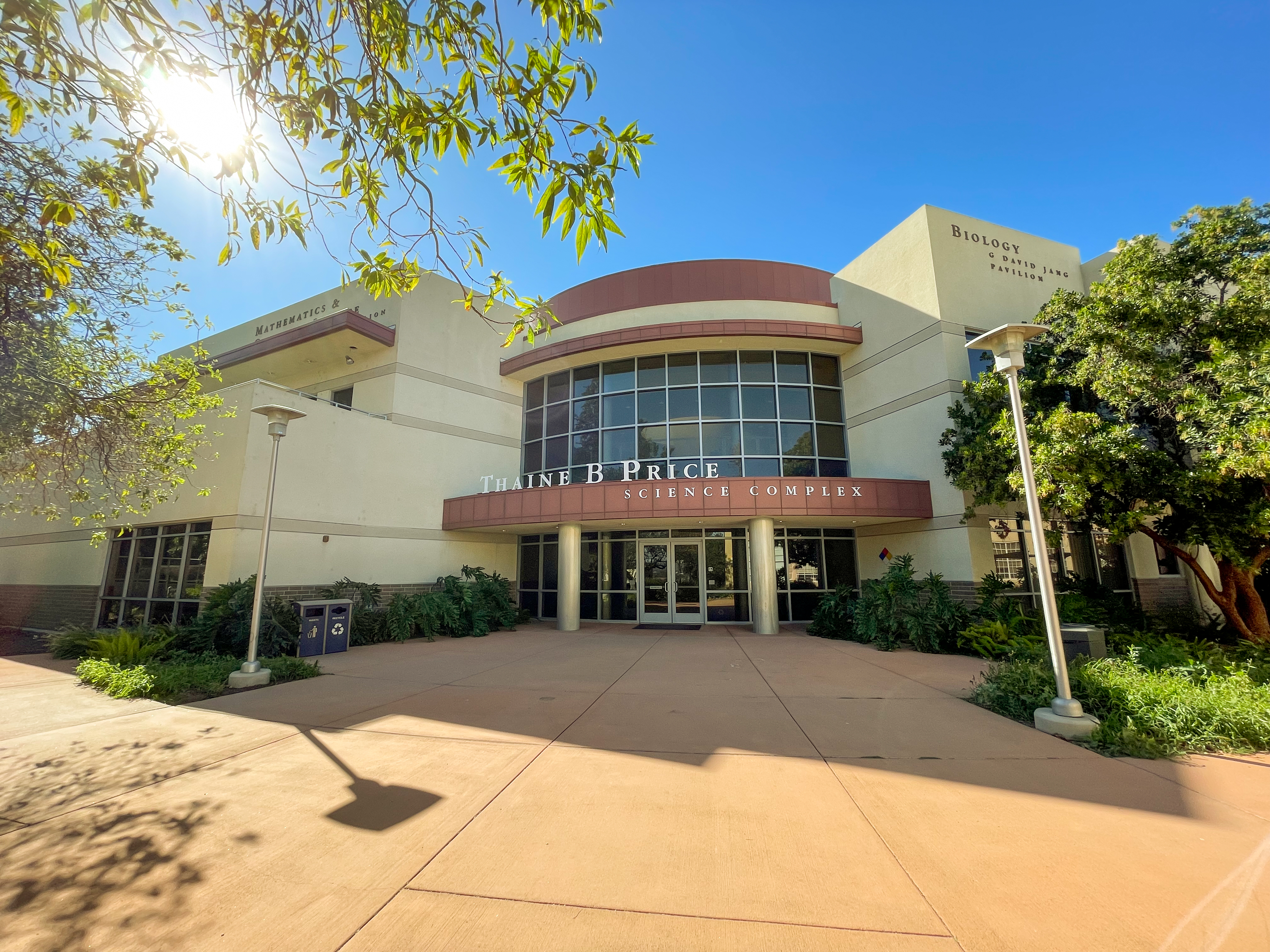
Thaine B. Price Science Complex

In 2009, the university's science curriculum became a subject of controversy as the school was publicly accused, primarily by former pastor David Asscherick, La Sierra University student Carlos Cerna, and former La Sierra University student Louie Bishop, of exclusively teaching evolution in its biology classes, which the accusers felt was contrary to the teachings of the Adventist church. Concerned about the allegation, a campaign collected over 6,300 signatures to an online petition which called for Adventist universities to teach the Genesis creation narrative.

The university's board of trustees unanimously affirmed the Seventh-day Adventist Church's 28 Fundamental Beliefs but some viewed that as inadequate. In 2010, the regional accreditation agency responsible for La Sierra, the Western Association of Schools and Colleges, gave the university an eight-year accreditation extension despite concerns over academic freedom and institutional autonomy. La Sierra was accused of apostasy by the executive committee of the Michigan Conference, one of the church's regional governing bodies. In 2011, the denominational accreditation agency, the Adventist Accrediting Association, gave La Sierra an accreditation extension ending in 2012, but required it to make changes to better promote Adventist teachings.

In June 2011, three La Sierra University staff members resigned after a recording surfaced in which they were heard consuming alcohol and speaking critically of church officials. They alleged that they were compelled to resign in relation to the ongoing controversy but the university denied those allegations; the staff members sued the university but lost their case. Later that year, the board of trustees voted in favor of a proposal stating "that creation be taught in university classrooms as faith, rather than science, and that students be told that it could not be proven with scientific methods." Prior to the vote, three out of four trustees in favor were dismissed from the board. One of the five faculty signers of the proposal was dismissed from the university which the American Association of University Professors protested as a violation of academic freedom and tenure.

== Campus ==
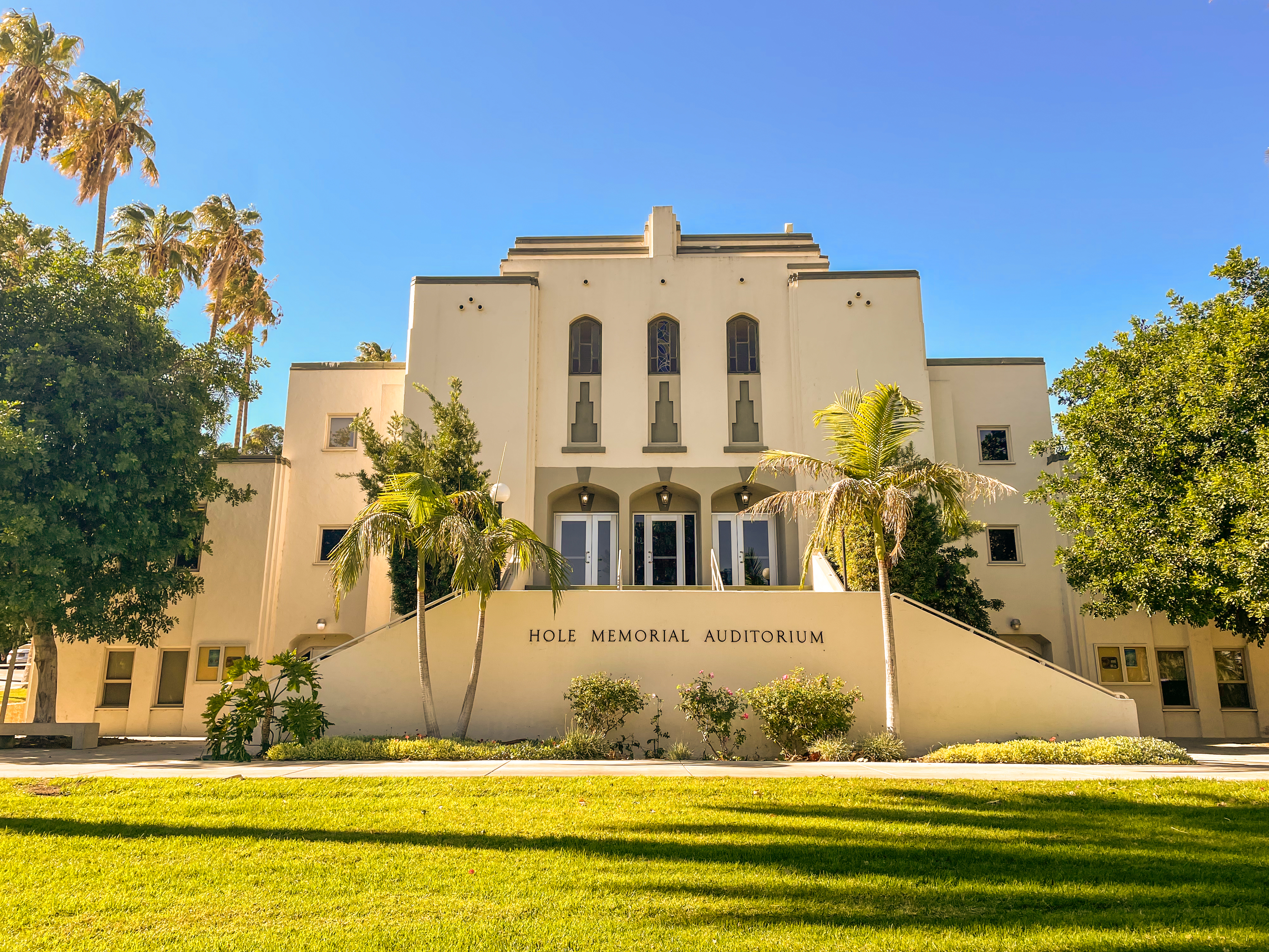
Hole Memorial Auditorium

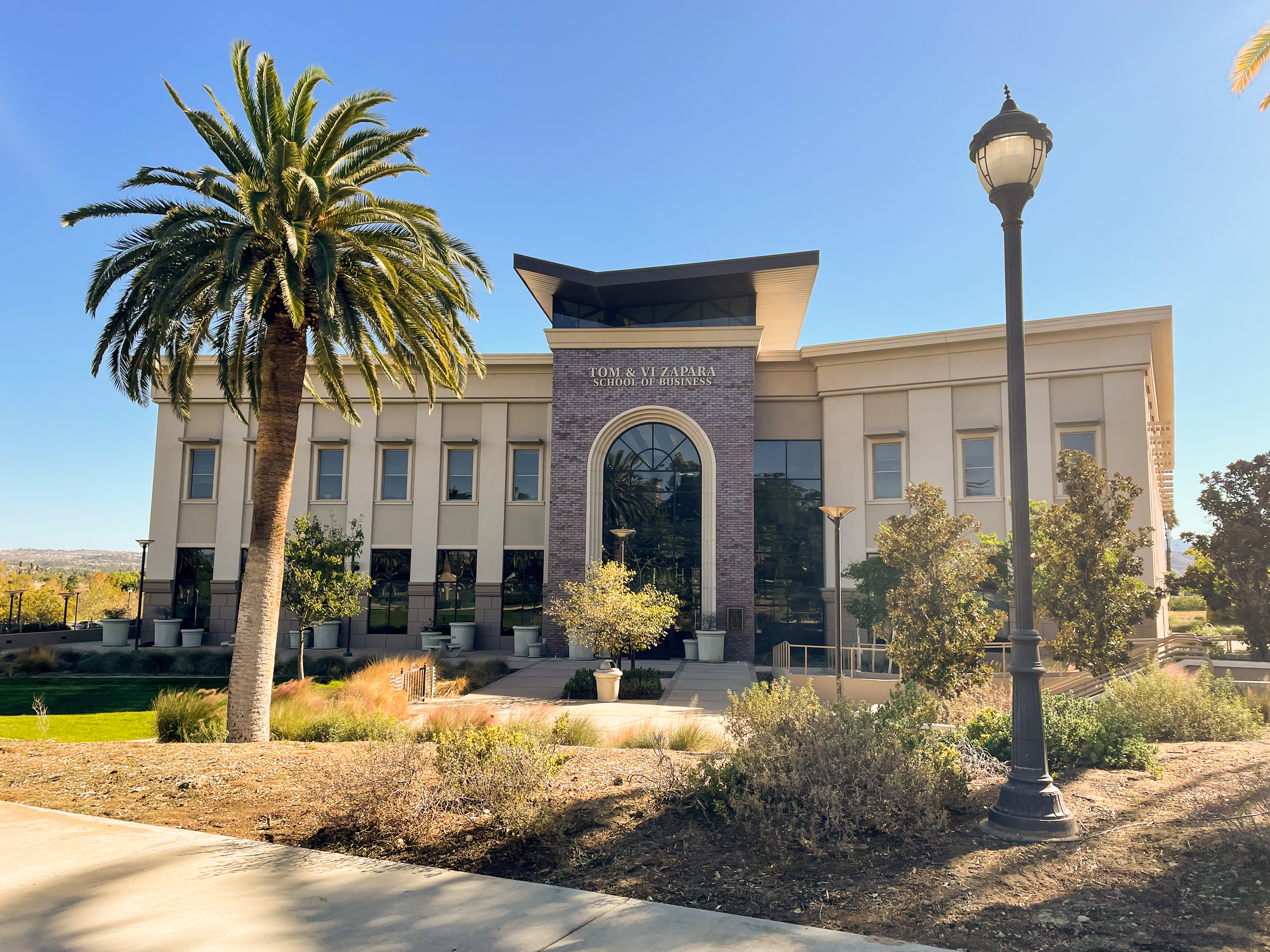
Tom & Vi Zapara School of Business

La Sierra's 150-acre campus is located in the La Sierra neighborhood of the city of Riverside. The school is a member of the American Public Gardens Association, which has designated the campus an arboretum.

The first buildings built on the campus were two-story separate male and female dormitories.

The university opened a $23 million science complex in the fall of 2006, which houses its biology, computer science, and mathematics departments.

As a Seventh-day Adventist university, all restaurants on campus serve only vegetarian food. The university also has a church near the campus with a cross-shaped design when viewed from above.

=== Observatory ===
The Frances E. Barnard Memorial Observatory is located behind the main La Sierra campus at the base of Mount Two-Bit. The observatory was named for Frances Evelyn Barnard, mother of Marion Cecil Barnard, who donated the money necessary to build the observatory and purchase two telescopes (one of which is currently mounted to the concrete pier inside the building).

== Academics ==
La Sierra University is composed of the College of Arts and Sciences, Tom & Vi Zapara School of Business, H.M.S. Richards Divinity School, and School of Education. The university operates on the quarter system.

=== Research ===
Lee Grismer, a biology professor at La Sierra, has been noted for discovering multiple species of geckos in Southeast Asia.

== Student life ==
=== Enactus ===
La Sierra is a leading school in the Enactus (formerly Students in Free Enterprise, or SIFE) program. Since the inauguration of the SIFE World Cup (now Enactus World Cup) in 2001, the school has represented the United States twice, in 2002 and 2007, and won both times. In the United States competition, La Sierra has won the national championship seven times, from 1994 to 1997 and again in 2002, 2007, and 2016, has been first runner up three times, in 2000, 2001, and 2008, and has been second runner up once, in 2009.

=== Honors program ===
Founded in the 1990s, Honors at La Sierra involves a general education package with courses that are discussion and project-based and designed to lead into one another. Cohorts of about 20 students take courses in the arts, sciences, religion, and other areas, taking part in research and community involvement projects and going on an international trip at the end of their sophomore year. Honors is also a community of scholars, centered around the program's dorm (South Hall), where students study, socialize, and live.

== Athletics ==
The La Sierra athletic teams are called the Golden Eagles. The university is a member of the National Association of Intercollegiate Athletics (NAIA), primarily competing in the California Pacific Conference (Cal Pac) since the 2013–14 academic year. The Golden Eagles previously competed as an NAIA Independent within the Association of Independent Institutions (AII) from 2010–11 (when the school joined the NAIA) to 2012–13; and in the NCAA Division III ranks as an NCAA D-III Independent.

La Sierra competes in nine intercollegiate varsity sports: Men's sports include baseball, basketball, cross country and soccer; women's sports include basketball, cross country, soccer, softball and volleyball.

In 2025, The La Sierra Golden Eagles left the California Pacific Conference and joined the GSAC Conference to became their most recent member.

== See also ==
- Katherine Siva Saubel – Cahuilla people leader, received an honorary Ph.D. from La Sierra University
- Pacific Union College
