= Heshbon =

Ancient Middle Eastern town

Coordinates: 31°48′03″N 35°48′32″E

Location of Heshbon in modern-day Jordan

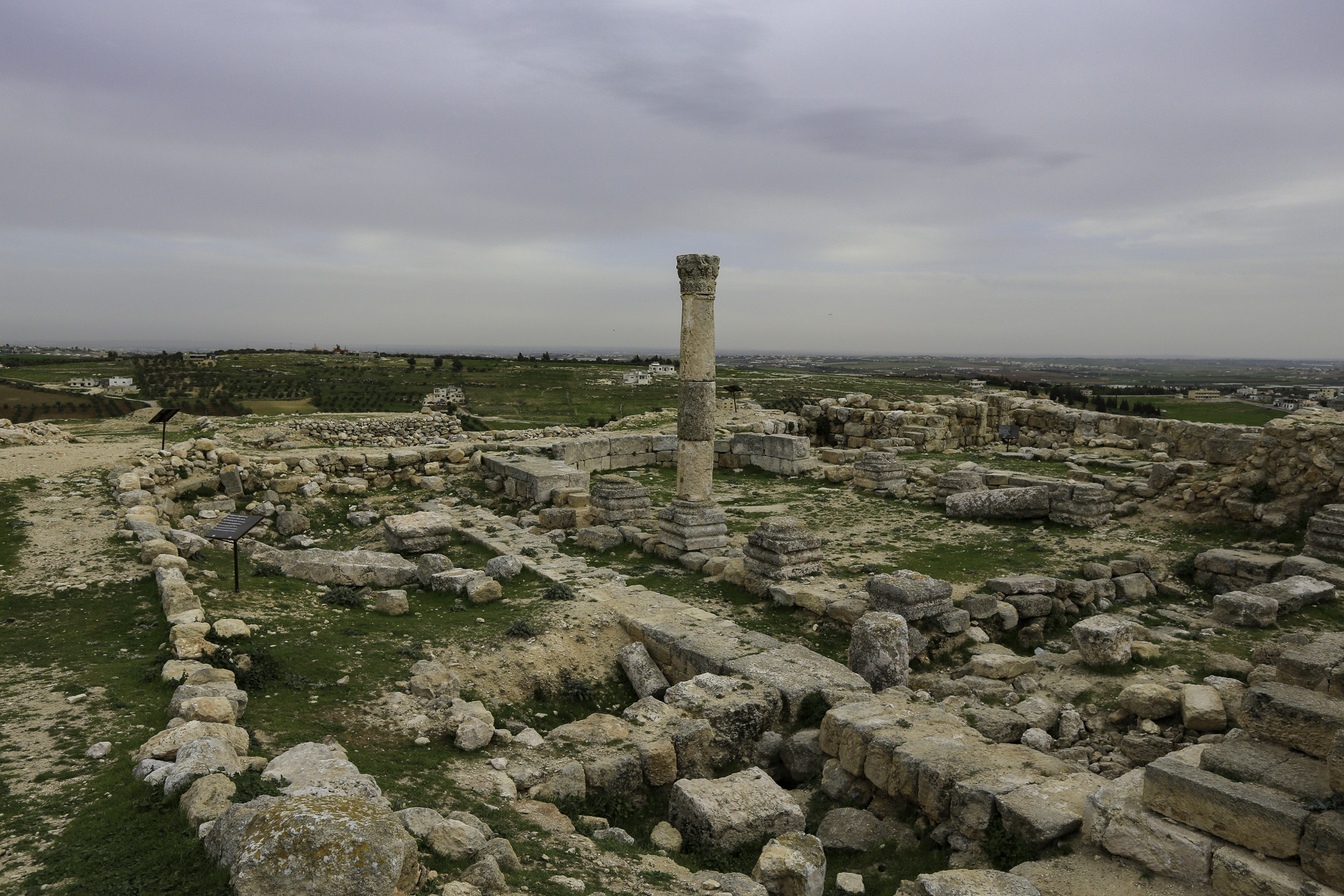
Tell Hesban

Heshbon (also Hesebon, Esebon, Esbous, Esbus; Arabic: حشبون, Latin: Esebus, Hebrew: חשבון Ḥešbōn, Ancient Greek: Ἐσεβών, Ἐσσεβών, Ἐσβούτα, Ἐσβούς, Ἔσβους, Ἔξβους) were at least two different ancient towns located east of the Jordan River in what is now the Kingdom of Jordan, historically within the territories of ancient Ammon.

The Bronze Age Heshbon of biblical King Sihon has not been identified. The town of Esbus from the Roman and Byzantine period has been identified with a tell (archaeological mound) known in Arabic as Tell Hisban or Tell Ḥesbān.

== Location of Tell Hisban ==
The Roman and Byzantine town is believed to have been located at the ruin called Hesbân or Hisban, about 20 km (12 mi) southwest of Amman, and 9 kilometers (5.6 mi) to the north of Madaba, on one of the highest summits of the mountains of Moab. A large ruined reservoir is located east of the place, and below the town there is a fountain.

== Biblical reference to Heshbon ==
Ancient Heshbon was beyond, i.e. east of, the Jordan. The city was where the Israelites passed by on their entry to the Promised Land, and was assigned to the tribe of Reuben; afterwards it was given to the Tribe of Gad and became a Levitical city for the Merarites.

Heshbon is mentioned in the Tanakh in the Books of Numbers and Deuteronomy as the capital of Amorite king, Sihon (also known as Sehon). The biblical narrative records the story of the Israelite victory over Sihon during the time of the Exodus under the leadership of Moses. Heshbon is highlighted due to its importance as the capital of Sihon, King of the Amorites:

"For Heshbon was the city of Sihon, king of the Amorites, who had fought against the former king of Moab and had taken all his land out of his hand, as far as the Arnon."

Similar passages appear in Deuteronomy and Joshua, with the primary emphasis being the victory of the Israelites over King Sihon at the site of Heshbon. Moses died soon after the victory, after viewing the "promised land" from the top of Mount Nebo.

Following the death of Moses, Heshbon became a town at the border between the lands allocated to the Tribe of Reuben and the Tribe of Gad. Further biblical evidence suggests that the town later came under Moabite control, as mentioned by Isaiah and Jeremiah in their denunciations of Moab, and later under Ammonite occupation as Jeremiah 49:3 strongly suggests.

Heshbon also appears in the Song of Solomon, where the poet likens his love's eyes to "the pools of Heshbon", which refers to the magnificent fish-pools of Heshbon.

== Historical reference to classical towns ==
=== Herodian Es(e)bonitis/Sebonitis: possibly elsewhere ===
The name occurs in Josephus very often under the form Esbonitis or Sebonitis. According to Josephus, Heshbon was in the possession of the Judeans since Alexander Jannaeus the Maccabee (106–79 B.C.) took it and made it a Jewish town. Herod the Great is also said to have had jurisdiction over the town and established a fort there. However, this town might not be identical with Tell Hesban: Josephus tell us that Pheroras, the younger brother of Herod the Great and tetrarch of Perea, had his residence at Esebonitis. This Esebonitis, described as a strongly fortified garrison town, has not been firmly identified and might be identical with either Machaerus, a site well researched by archaeologists and closely resembling Josephus's description of Esebonitis, with Amathus, or with Gadora, the later placed by researchers at Tell Jadur near Salt.

=== Late Roman Esebon, Esboús ===
After the Great Revolt (A.D. 68–70) the country was invaded by the tribe that Pliny calls Arabes Esbonitae, meaning "Arabs of (H)esebon". Restored under the name of Esboús or Esboúta, it is mentioned among the towns of the Roman Arabia Petraea by Ptolemy.

=== Byzantine Hesebon ===
Under the Byzantines, as learned from Eusebius' Onomasticon, it grew to be a town of note in the province of Arabia; George of Cyprus refers to it in the seventh century and it was from Hesebon that the milestones on the Roman road to Jericho were numbered.

The Byzantine town is mentioned in the 3rd century CE Mosaic of Rehob.

=== Early Arab period ===
At the beginning of the Early Arab period, Hesebon was still the chief town of the Belka, a territory corresponding to the old kingdom of Sihon. It seems never to have been taken by the Crusaders.

== History of excavation ==
In 1968, archaeological excavations were undertaken at the site of Tell Hesban (alternatively spelled Tall Hisban). This excavation was the beginning of what became called the "Heshbon Expedition". This archaeological work was sponsored by Andrews University and under the authority of the American Schools of Oriental Research (ASOR). The Heshbon Expedition continued with excavation seasons through 1976. Following the cessation of Heshbon Expedition excavations, archaeological work at the site continued in 1996 under the Madaba Plains Project consortium. The site continues to be excavated into the 2010s; work is also ongoing to support archaeological tourism at the site.

== Archaeological findings ==
=== Not the Bronze Age Heshbon? ===
The lack of evidence for occupation during the Bronze Age led excavators to conclude that the site is not Sihon's Heshbon. William Dever's response was "The site was excavated in 1968–1976 in a large interdisciplinary project sponsored by a group of Seventh Day Adventist scholars who perhaps intended to “prove” the biblical traditions of the Israelite conquest of the site. Much to their consternation, however, the town turned out to be founded only in the Iron II period—long after any supposed conquest. There were only a few scattered remains of the 12th–11th century B.C. (pottery, but no architecture), and no trace whatsoever of occupation in the 13th century B.C. The excavators resolutely published their results, however, and reluctantly conceded that something was drastically wrong with the biblical story about Heshbon."

According to Øystein S. LaBianca and Bethany Walker, the excavations found remains from the Late Bronze and Early Iron Age periods, but intensive reuse of the site by later occupants resulted in most remains from those periods being found in secondary deposits.

=== Hellenistic period ===
A Late Hellenistic fortress yielded five Hasmonean coins, including one minted by Antigonus II Mattathias (r. 40 to 37 BC). On this basis, archaeologist Dvir Raviv considers pro-Antigonus activity in parts of Transjordan plausible, although not certain.

=== Roman-period Esbus ===
Classical period remains, however, confirmed its status as the Roman-period city of Esbus.

=== Byzantine period ===
Two churches have been discovered from the Byzantine era, and both churches produced impressive remains of mosaic floors. Particularly interesting is the nilotic (using motifs originating in the environs of the river Nile) mosaic of the presbytery of the North Church where the mosaicists have created a motif of a turtledove set on a nest made of an imaginary flower.

== Ecclesiastical history ==
Hesebon is a titular see of the ecclesiastical province of Arabia, suffragan of Bostra.

Christianity took root there at an early period. Michel Le Quien (Oriens christianus II, 863–64), and Pius Bonifacius Gams (Series Episcoporum, 435) mention three bishops between the fourth and seventh centuries:

- Gennadius, present at the Council of Nicaea (Heinrich Gelzer, Patrum Nicaen. Nomina, p. lxi)
- Zosys of Esbusa signature of the Council of Ephesus in 431.
- Zosius, whose name occurs in the lists of Chalcedon
- Theodore, champion of orthodoxy against monothelism, who received (c. 649) from Pope Martin I a letter congratulating him on his resistance to the heresy and exhorting him to continue the struggle in conjunction with John of Philadelphia. To the latter the pope had entrusted the government of the patriarchates of Antioch and Jerusalem.

Konrad Eubel (Hierarchia Catholica, II, 168) mentions two Latin titulars of Hesebon in the latter part of the fifteenth century.

== Hazboun family ==
The Hazboun family have long history roots from Heshbon.

== See also ==
- Isaiah 15
- Cities in the Book of Joshua
- Heshbon Expedition
- Madaba Plains Project
