= Tall al-Umayri =

Archaeological site near Amman, Jordan

Tall al-’Umayri
- تل العميري (Arabic)
- Tell Umairy
- Location within Jordan
- 31°52′07″N 35°53′17″E
- Type: Prehistoric site
- Cultures: Early Bronze Age
- Location: Amman, Jordan

Site notes
- Height: 883 m (2,897 ft)
- Excavation dates: Multiple

Tall al-’Umayri is an archaeological site in western Jordan that dates from the Early Bronze Age (3200–2100 BCE) to the Hellenistic period (323–30 BCE). It is located near the modern capital of Amman and is significant for its well-preserved evidence of a temple, as well as archaeological evidence of a network of small farms believed to have produced wine. Excavations were proceeding as of 2014.

== Location ==
The site sits atop a low ridge between the Queen Alia Airport highway and Amman National Park, approximately 2,900 feet above sea level. While the location offers few natural defenses, it was probably selected to take advantage of the natural spring that flowed as recently as the 1930s according to local historian Raouf Abujaber. It appears that this would have been the only reliable water source for travelers between Amman and Madaba.

== Excavation ==
The site was first noted by Charles Warren in 1867, but was apparently not visited again by archaeologists until the Hisban regional survey in 1976. It has been the subject of several large-scale explorations, beginning in 1984 under the Madaba Plains Project, which by 2010 had uncovered over 4,000 artifacts and 50,000 pieces of pottery.

== Chronology ==
Though the site appears to have never had more than a few dozen buildings, archaeological artifacts have been recovered from 21 different strata. This indicates that the site has been occupied for all but 1,200 years since the early Bronze Age (c. 3200 BCE) to the present, with a few flints and cherts from even earlier periods. A dolmen from this earliest period contains disarticulated skeletons from at least 20 people, along with several associated structures and pottery fragments. This phase of occupation peaked approximately 2500 BCE based on the ruins of several houses and streets, before being abandoned by 2200 BCE.

The site was recolonized and fortified with a 5-meter-deep moat topped by a 5-meter-tall rampart around 1600 BCE, but there is no clear evidence it was occupied between 1550 and 1350 BCE. A large, well-preserved, five-room, two-story structure built in the Late Bronze Age (c. 1300 BCE) has been the subject of some debate among archaeologists. It contained hundreds of unburnt animal bones, a cult wall built around 5 natural standing stones, and an Asherah figurine suggesting it was a temple. It also contained considerable areas full of domestic artifacts more in keeping with a palatial residence. Three substantial four room structures, typical of the early Iron Age, though slightly predating them (c. 1200 BCE), were built about a century later. These appear to have met a violent end: in addition to numerous kitchen and farmyard implements, the charred skeletons of four people and discarded weaponry were discovered within the burned ruins of the house.

Occupation by a distinct culture began again around 1050 BCE, as inferred from a change in pottery style. The evidence suggests a fairly sparse population for the next four centuries. However, in approximately 600 BCE, a major administrative complex was built at 'Umayri, apparently under the patronage of the Ammonite king Ba'alyasha' or Baalis, whose name was found on several seals from this stratum. Artifacts bearing a stamp with the word "'Ammon" written in Aramaic persist until approximately 400 BCE, well into the Persian Era. After a two-centuries without occupation, the site apparently persisted as a farmstead built around the spring from 200 BCE to 135 CE. A tomb with a Greek inscription and a plastered ritual pool from the time period indicate connections to other Mediterranean cultures. After 350 CE, numerous pottery fragments, sherds, and wall fragments indicate it was at least transiently occupied during the Byzantine and Islamic periods, and possibly by the Bedouin into the 20th century.

== See also ==
- Jericho#Stone Age: Tell es-Sultan and spring
- Madaba#Archaeological finds
