= Tribe of Levi =

One of the twelve Tribes of Israel

In the Bible, the Tribe of Levi is one of the tribes of Israel, traditionally descended from Levi, son of Jacob. The descendants of Aaron, who was the first High Priest of Israel, were designated as the priestly class, the Kohanim.

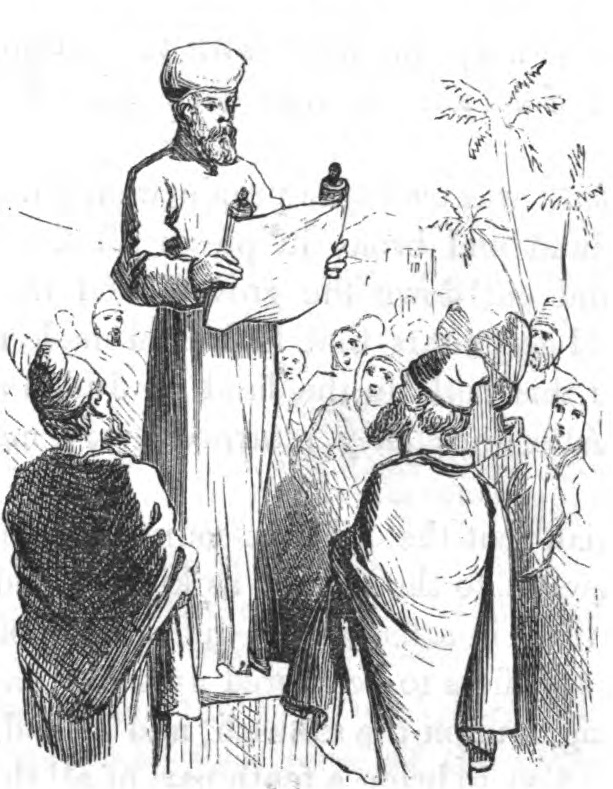
Levite reading the law to the Israelites (1873 drawing)

The Tribe of Levi served particular religious duties for the Israelites and had political responsibilities as well. In return, the landed tribes were expected to give tithes to the Kohanim, the priests working in the Temple in Jerusalem, particularly the first tithe. The Levites who were not Kohanim played music in the Temple or served as guards. Most scholars view the Torah as projecting the origins of the Levites into the past to explain their role as landless cultic functionaries.

When Joshua led the Israelites into the land of Canaan, the Levites were the only Israelite tribe that received cities but were not allowed land tenure; Joshua 13:33, "But no portion was assigned by Moses to the tribe of Levi; YHWH God of Israel is their portion—as [God] spoke concerning them." Some Biblical traditions point to the alien aspects of the Levites and their role as military troops. In this context, the etymology linking the term Levi with the Mycenaean Greek term la-wo (the people / armed people) was proposed.

Notable descendants of the Levite lineage according to the Bible include Moses, Aaron, Miriam, Samuel, Jeremiah, Ezekiel, Ezra, and Malachi.

== In the Bible ==
=== In the Torah ===
According to the Torah, the tribe is named after Levi, one of the twelve sons of Jacob (also called Israel). Levi married a woman named Adinah—according to the Book of Jasher—and had three sons: Gershon, Kohath, and Merari (Genesis 46:11). Levi also had a daughter named Jochebed (Exodus 6:20).

Levi	Adinah
Gershon	Kohath	Merari
Libni	Shimei	Izhar	Hebron	Uzziel	Mahli	Mushi
Jochebed	Amram	Mishael	Elzaphan	Zithri
Miriam	Aaron	Moses

Kohath's son Amram was the father of Miriam, Aaron and Moses. The descendants of Aaron, the Kohanim, had the special role as priests in the Tabernacle in the wilderness and also in the Temple in Jerusalem. The remaining Levites were divided into three groups: Gershonites (descended from Gershon), Kohathites (from Kohath), and Merarites (from Merari). Each division filled different roles in the Tabernacle and later in the Temple services.

Levites' principal roles in the Temple included singing Psalms during Temple services, performing construction and maintenance for the Temple, serving as guards, and performing other services. Levites also served as teachers and judges, maintaining cities of refuge in biblical times. The Book of Ezra reports that the Levites were responsible for the construction of the Second Temple and also translated and explained the Torah when it was publicly read.

During the Exodus the Levite tribe were particularly zealous in protecting the Mosaic law in the face of those worshipping the golden calf, which may have been a reason for their priestly status. Although the Levites were not counted in the census among the children of Israel, they were numbered separately as a special army.

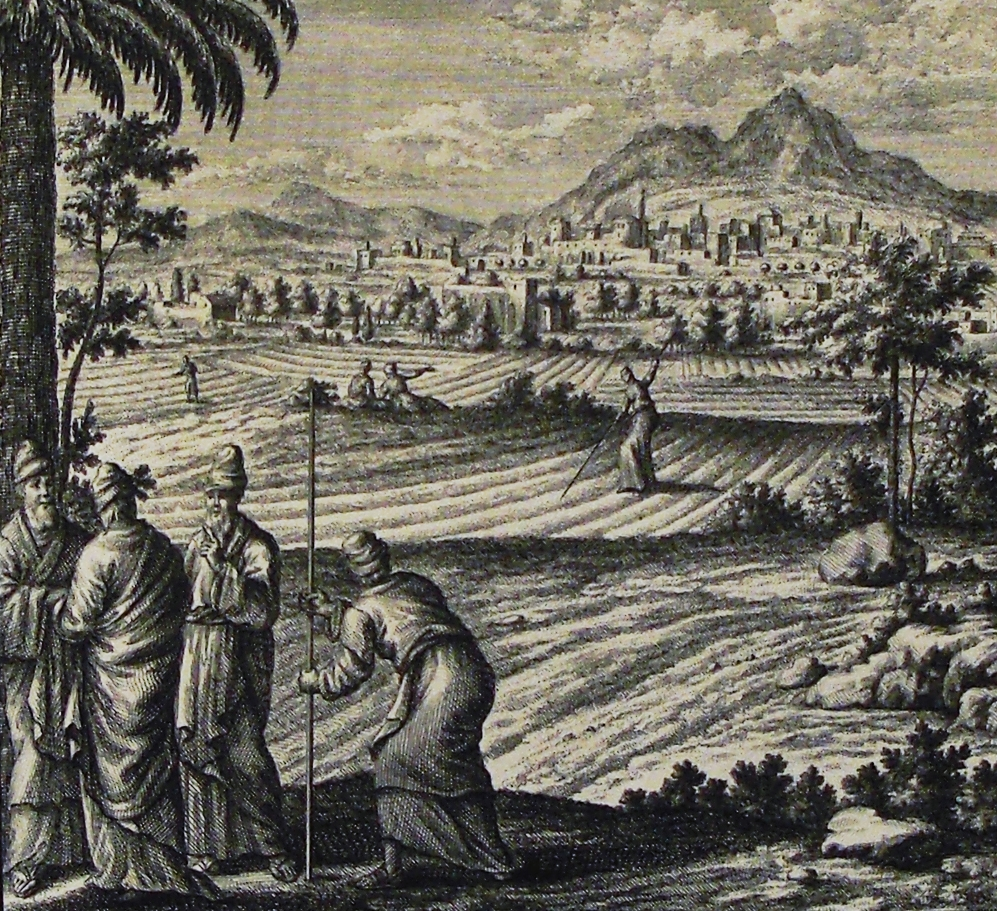
Illustration of the allotment of land to the Levites (Numbers 35:4–5)

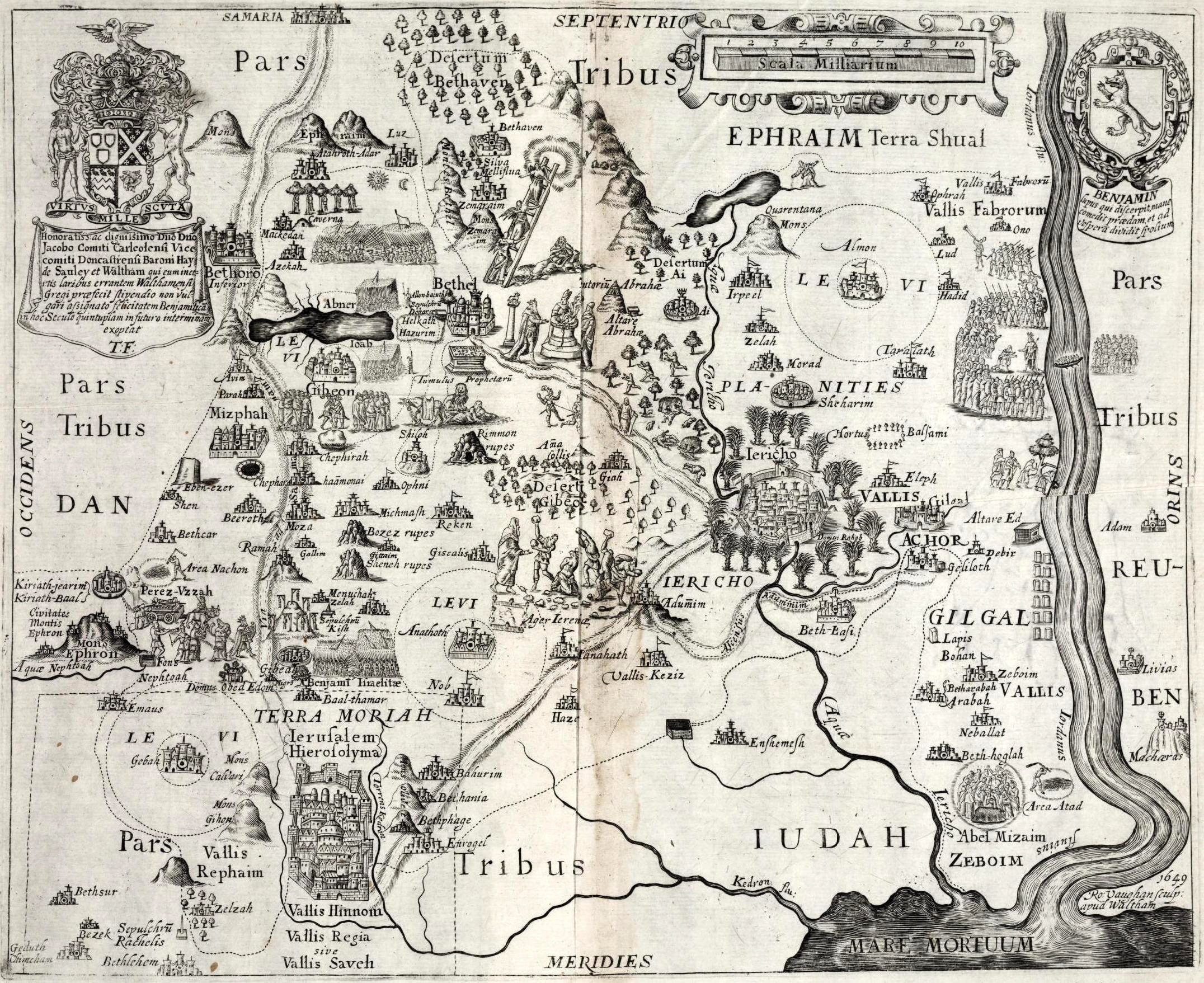
Map of the territory of Benjamin. Note the area around the cities allotted to the Levites, per Numbers 35:4–5

In the Book of Numbers the Levites were charged with ministering to the Kohanim and keeping watch over the Tabernacle:

^{2} And with you bring your brother also, the tribe of Levi, the tribe of your father, that they may join you and minister to you while you and your sons with you are before the tent of the testimony.^{3} They shall keep guard over you and over the whole tent, but shall not come near to the vessels of the sanctuary or to the altar lest they, and you, die.^{4} They shall join you and keep guard over the tent of meeting for all the service of the tent, and no outsider shall come near you.^{5} And you shall keep guard over the sanctuary and over the altar, that there may never again be wrath on the people of Israel.^{6} And behold, I have taken your brothers the Levites from among the people of Israel. They are a gift to you, given to the Lord, to do the service of the tent of meeting.

Numbers 18:2–6 (ESV)

=== In the Books of the Prophets ===
The Books of the Prophets or Nevi'im are one part of the Hebrew Bible.

The Book of Jeremiah speaks of a covenant with the Kohanim and Levites, connecting it with the covenant with the seed of King David:

As the host of heaven cannot be numbered, neither the sand of the sea measured; so will I multiply the seed of David My servant, and the Levites that minister unto Me.
And the word of the LORD came to Jeremiah, saying:
'Considerest thou not what this people have spoken, saying: The two families which the LORD did choose, He hath cast them off?

Jeremiah 33:22–24, Jewish Publication Society translation, 1917

The Book of Malachi also spoke of a covenant with Levi:

Know then that I have sent this commandment unto you, that My covenant might be with Levi, saith the LORD of hosts.
My covenant was with him of life and peace, and I gave them to him, and of fear, and he feared Me, and was afraid of My name.
The law of truth was in his mouth, and unrighteousness was not found in his lips; he walked with Me in peace and uprightness, and did turn many away from iniquity.

Malachi 2:4–6, Jewish Publication Society translation, 1917

Malachi connected a purification of the "sons of Levi" with the coming of God's messenger:

Behold, I send My messenger, and he shall clear the way before Me; and the Lord, whom ye seek, will suddenly come to His temple, and the messenger of the covenant, whom ye delight in, behold, he cometh, saith the LORD of hosts.
But who may abide the day of his coming? And who shall stand when he appeareth? For he is like a refiner's fire, and like fullers' soap;
And he shall sit as a refiner and purifier of silver; and he shall purify the sons of Levi, and purge them as gold and silver; and there shall be they that shall offer unto the LORD offerings in righteousness.

Malachi 3:1–3, Jewish Publication Society translation, 1917

== Criticism ==
Critical scholars who follow the documentary hypothesis propose that those parts of the Torah attributed to the Elohist seem to treat Levite as a descriptive attribute for someone particularly suited to the priesthood, rather than as a firm designation of a tribe, and believe that Moses and Aaron are being portrayed as part of the Joseph group rather than being part of a tribe called Levi. Jahwist passages have more ambiguous language; traditionally interpreted as referring to a person named Levi, they could also be interpreted as just referring to a social position titled levi.

In the Blessing of Jacob, Levi is treated as a tribe, cursing them to become scattered; critics regard this as an aetiological postdiction to explain how a tribe could be so scattered, the simpler solution being that the priesthood was originally open to any tribe, but gradually became seen as a distinct tribe to themselves. The Priestly source and the Blessing of Moses, which critical scholars view as originating centuries later, portray the Levites firmly established as a tribe, and as the only tribe with the right to become priests.

Aren M. Maier holds that it is very likely that priestly groups such as the Levites existed during the First Temple period, since the existence of cultic groups of that kind were very common within the ancient Near East.

== See also ==
- House of Lévis
- Tribe of Joseph
