= Shimei =

Name in the Hebrew Bible

Shimei (Hebrew: שִׁמְעִי Šīmʿī) is the name of a number of persons referenced in the Hebrew Bible and Rabbinical literature.

- The second son of Gershon and grandson of Levi (Exodus 6:17; Numbers 3:18; 1 Chronicles 6:17). The family of the Shimeites, as a branch of the tribe of Levi, is mentioned in Numbers 3:18, 21; 1 Chronicles 23:7, 10, 11 ("Shimei" in verse 9 could be a scribal error); and in Zechariah 12:13. In the New Testament the name occurs in Luke 3:26, spelled Semei in the King James Version.

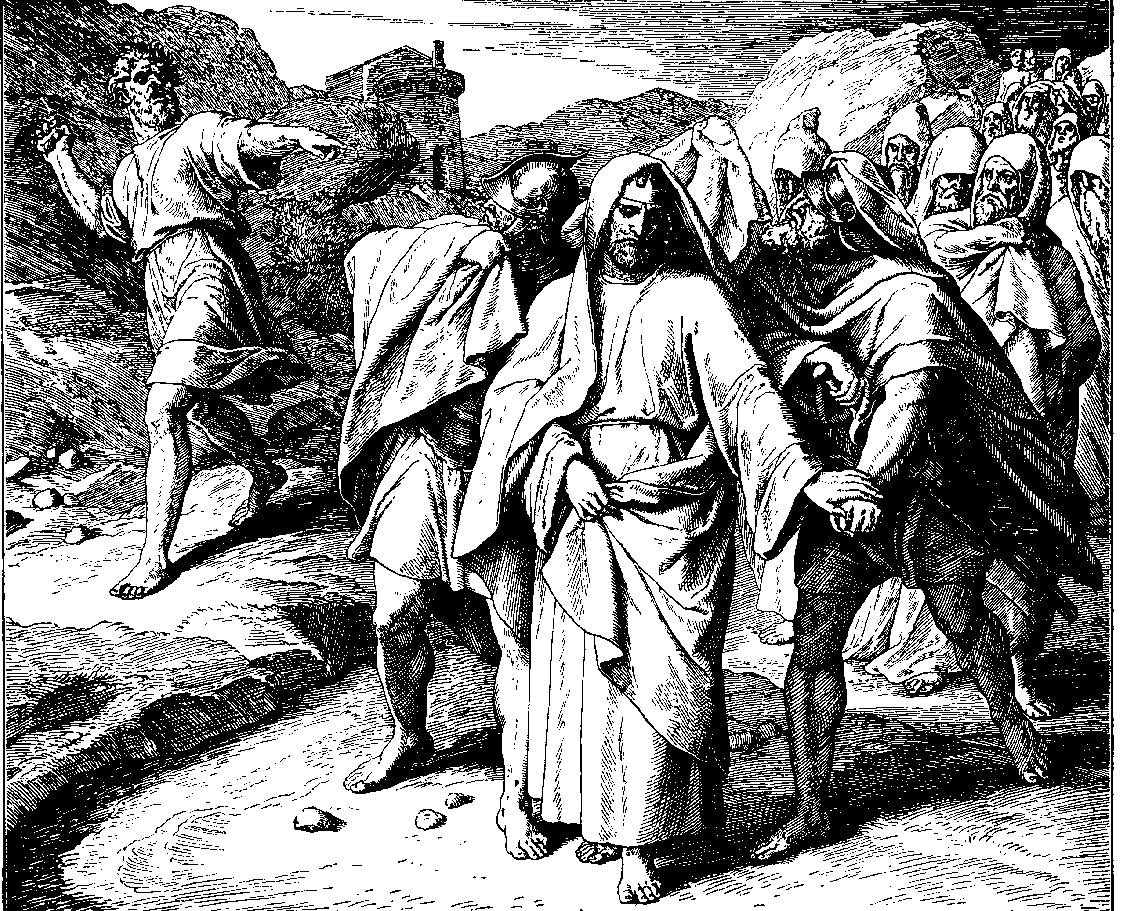
Shimei curses David, 1860 woodcut by Julius Schnorr von Karolsfeld

- Shimei ben Gera, a Benjamite of Bahurim, son of Gera, "a man of the family of the house of Saul" (2 Samuel 16:5–14, 19:16–23; 1 Kings 2:8–9, 36–46). He is mentioned as one of David's tormentors during his flight before Absalom, and as imploring and winning David's forgiveness when the latter returned. David, however, in his dying charge to Solomon, bade him avenge the insult (1 Kings 2:9). Jewish scribes say that Solomon's teacher was Shimei (son of Gera), and while he lived, he prevented Solomon from marrying foreign wives. The Talmud says at Ber. 8a: "For as long as Shimei the son of Gera was alive Solomon did not marry the daughter of Pharaoh" (see also Midrash Tehillim to Ps. 3:1).
- A brother of David, called also Shammah, Shimeah, and Shimea (1 Samuel 16:9; 17:13; 2 Samuel 13:3; 21:21; 1 Chronicles 2:13; 20:7)
- A friend of King David mentioned in 1 Kings 1:8
- Son of Elah, one of Solomon's prefects, over the district of Benjamin (1 Kings 4:18)
- A grandson of Jeconiah and brother of Zerubbabel (1 Chronicles 3:19)
- A grandson of Simeon, who is described as the father of sixteen sons and six daughters, and whose clan dwelt in Judea (1 Chronicles 4:26, 27)
- A Reubenite (1 Chronicles 5:4)
- Levites (1 Chronicles 6:29, 42; 25:17; 2 Chronicles 29:14; 31:12, 13)
- A Benjamite chief who had nine sons (1 Chronicles 8:21, R. V.; comp. ib. v. 13)
- "The Ramathite," one of David's officers (1 Chronicles 27:27)
- A Levite and other Israelites whom Ezra required to put away their foreign wives (Ezra 10:23, 33, 38)
- Grandfather of Mordecai (Esther 2:5).

== Family tree ==
Levi	Adinah (Note: In the Masoretic Text, Levi's wife is not named. She is called Adina in the Septuagint and Adinah in the Book of Jasher (Chapter 45, Verse 5-6), which also says that she was a daughter of Jobab, the son of Yoktan, the son of Eber.)
Gershon	Kehath	Merari
Libni	Shimei	Izhar	Hebron	Uzziel	Mahli	Mushi
Jochebed (Note: Jochebed is described as Levi's daughter, and thus her husband Amram's aunt, in the Book of Numbers (Numbers 26:59), the Masoretic Text of Exodus 6:20 and the Book of Jasher (Chapter 67, Verse 2-3). However, some manuscripts of the Septuagint Book of Exodus instead call her Amram's father's cousin, and others state that she was Amram's cousin.)	Amram	Mishael	Elzaphan	Zithri
Miriam	Aaron	Moses	Zipporah
Gershom	Eliezer
