= Jochebed =

Mother of Aaron, Miriam, and Moses in the Bible

- יוֹכֶבֶד
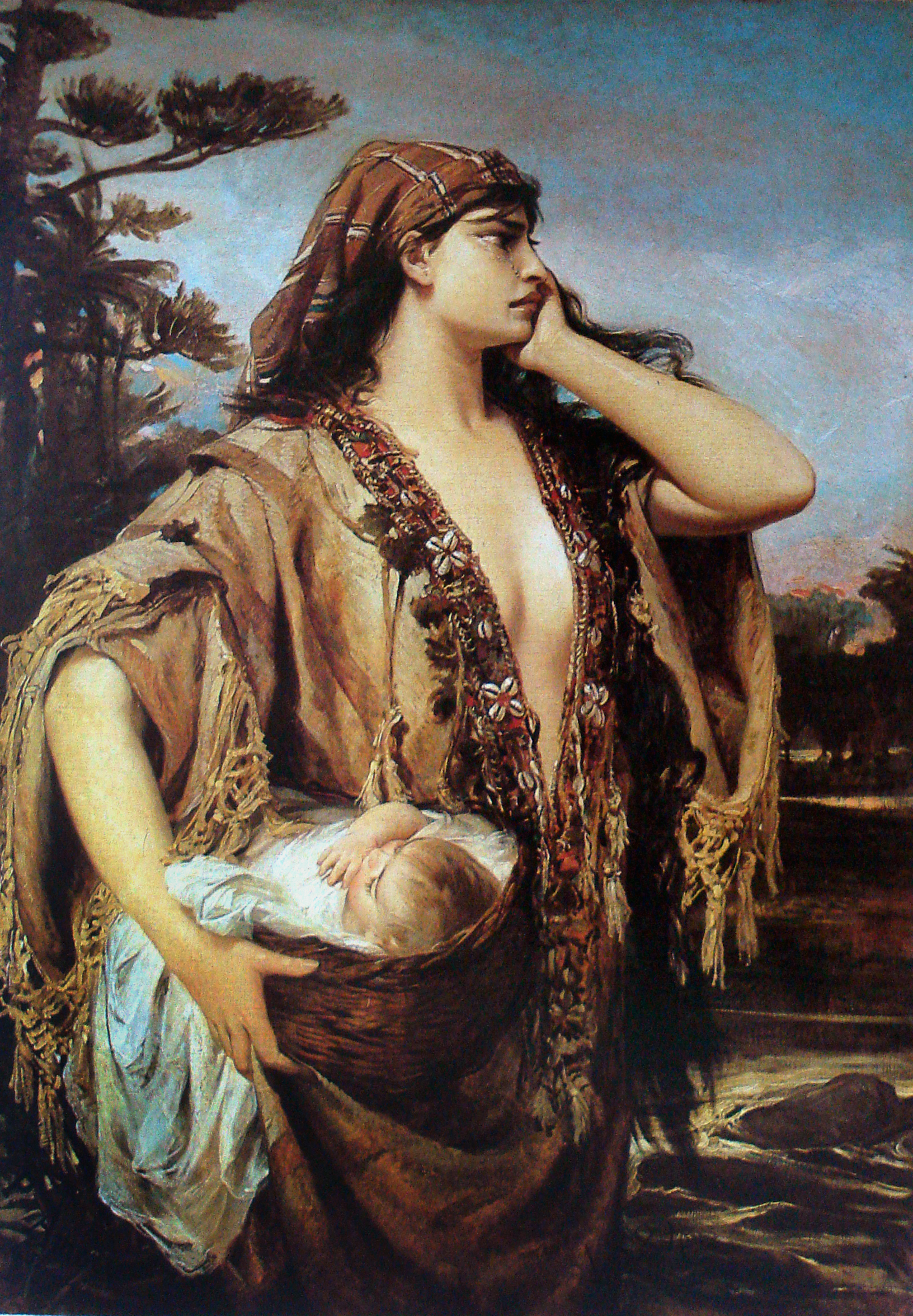
- Moses and Jochebed by Pedro Américo (1884)

Personal life
- Born: (most likely) Goshen, Lower Egypt, Ancient Egypt
- Died: Unknown
- Resting place: Tiberias, Israel
- Spouse: Amram
- Children: Miriam; Aaron; Moses
- Parent: Levi (father)
- Relatives: Gershon (brother); Kehath (brother); Merari (brother)

According to the Bible, Jochebed (/ˈjɒkɪbɛd/; Biblical Hebrew: יוֹכֶ֫בֶד, romanized: Yōḵeḇeḏ, lit. 'Yahweh is glory', Septuagint Koine Greek: Ἰωχάβεδ, romanized: Iokhábed) was a daughter of Levi and the mother of Miriam, Aaron, and Moses. She was the wife of Amram and either his cousin or aunt. No details are given concerning her life. According to Jewish legend, she is buried in the Tomb of the Matriarchs in Tiberias. In the New Testament, she is praised for her faith in God in Hebrews 11:23.

== Birth of Moses ==
The story of Jochebed is thought to be described in the Book of Exodus (2:1–10) – although she is not explicitly named here. (Her name is first mentioned in Exodus 6:20.) She lived in Egypt, where the descendants of Israel were being oppressed. The Pharaoh had decreed that all their baby boys were to be thrown into the Nile, because he feared that they might become too powerful. When Moses, her youngest child, was born, Jochebed hid him for three months until she could hide him no longer. To save her son's life, she waterproofed a basket and put the child in it, placing the basket in the flow of the River Nile. The basket fell in the hands of the Pharaoh's daughter who was bathing in the river. Moved with compassion when she discovered the child, she decided to adopt him. The "sister" of the child (presumed to be Miriam), who had come forward, suggested finding her a Hebrew woman to nurse the child. The Pharaoh's daughter agreed and so Miriam called her mother, who was appointed to take care of him. Thus Jochebed nursed her son until he was old enough and brought him to the Pharaoh's daughter, who adopted him as her son. The story continues with Moses, who grew up to become the leader of the Exodus, leading his people out of the land of Egypt.

== Relation to Amram ==
According to the Book of Numbers, Jochebed was born to Levi when he lived in Egypt. Amram was the son of Kohath, who was a son of Levi. This would make Jochebed the aunt of Amram, her husband. This kind of marriage between relatives was later forbidden by the law of Moses. Jochebed is also called Amram's father's sister in the Masoretic text of Exodus 6:20, but ancient translations differ in this. Some Greek and Latin manuscripts of the Septuagint state that Jochebed was Amram's father's cousin, and others state that she was Amram's cousin. Exodus 12:40 does also state that the length of time the Israelite people lived in Egypt (and depending on translation includes the time in Canaan) was for a period of 430 years, bringing contention to the understanding that Jochebed was the literal daughter to Levi. In the Apocryphal Testament of Levi, it is stated that Jochebed was born, as a daughter of Levi, when Levi was 64 years old.

== In Rabbinic literature ==
Some of the Ḥazal (rabbis of the Talmud) identify Yocheved with Shifra, one of the midwives described whom the first Pharaoh of Exodus ordered to kill newborn male childrenin Exodus 1:15–16. In making this identification, the Ḥazal interpret the "houses" with which Exodus describes God as having compensated the midwives in Exodus 1:21 as those of the kohenim (priesthood) and royalty. The Ḥazal interpret these "houses" as allegorical references to Jochebed's sons, Moses and Aaron in Exodus Rabbah 48:5.

Exodus Rabbah 1:13 argues that when Pharaoh instructed the midwives to throw all male children into the Nile, Amram divorced Jochebed, who was three months pregnant with Moses at the time. Miriam, their daughter, persuaded him to remarry Jochebed. It also argues that the Egyptians estimated the date of Moses' birth by counting nine months from the remarriage, thereby allowing Jochebed to hide him for the three months that were overestimated. The Targum Pseudo-Jonathan identifies Jochebed as also having been the wife of the Elisafon of Numbers 34:25 and the mother of Eldad and Medad; the text is ambiguous as to when this marriage occurred concerning the marriage(s) to Amram.

Jochebed's name is given various allegorical interpretations in Sotah 11b and Exodus Rabbah 1:17. Leviticus Rabbah identifies her as the person named in 1 Chronicles 4:18 as Biblical Hebrew: הַיְהֻדִיָּ֗ה, romanized: hay-Yəhuḏiyyā, lit. 'the female Judean', by arguing that it should be interpreted as her founding the people by disobeying the Pharaoh's order to kill the firstborn males.

Some rabbinic literature attempts to resolve the textual discrepancy in which the Torah lists 34 children of Leah born in Mesopotamia, stating that two were dead, and then immediately states that there were 33 in total in Genesis 46:15, by arguing that the figure referred only to the surviving children, and that Jochebed was the 33rd, such as Genesis Rabbah 94:8 and Exodus Rabbah 1:23. However, since the Book of Numbers describes Jochebed's birth as occurring in Egypt, this necessitated the further rabbinic argument that Jochebed was born exactly on the border of Egypt, in the 'gateway of the city' in Genesis Rabbah 94:8 and Exodus Rabbah 1:23. Biblical scholars have instead simply proposed that the discrepancy in the enumeration of Leah's children is due to the list not originally having included Dinah, who was added by a later editor to introduce consistency with the story of the Rape of Dinah.

According to traditional rabbinic biblical chronology, Moses was 80 years old when the Exodus occurred, the Israelites had been in Egypt for 210 years in total, and thus in combination with the rabbinical claim that Jochebed was born on the border of Egypt, as her parents had entered it, this would require Jochebed to have been 130 years old when she gave birth to Moses; Rabbinical literature regards this to have been alluded to be the biblical description of the dedication of the Israelite altar, at which 130 shekel weight of silver was offered according to Exodus Rabbah 1:23 and Numbers Rabbah 13:19.

According to Josephus, the birth of Moses was an extraordinary event because Jochebed was spared the pain of childbirth due to the piety of both her and Amram. The Haggadah extends this miraculous nature to Moses' conception by noting that Jochebed was 130 years old at the time. Several rabbinic commentaries attest to this, noting that Jochebed was restored to youth at the time of her marriage to Amram. The restoration of youth also included the resumption of her fertility.

== Textual criticism ==
Textual scholars attribute the genealogy to the book of generations, a hypothetical document originating from a similar religiopolitical group and date to the Priestly source. According to some Biblical scholars, the Torah's genealogy for Levi's descendants is an etiological myth reflecting the fact that there were four different groups among the Levites: the Gershonites, Kohathites, Merarites, and Aaronids. Aaron – the eponymous ancestor of the Aaronids – couldn't be portrayed as a brother to Gershon, Kohath, and Merari, as the narrative about the birth of Moses, brother of Aaron, which textual scholars attribute to the earlier Elohist source, mentions only that both his parents were Levites (without identifying their names). Some Biblical scholars suspect that the Elohist account offers both matrilineal and patrilinial descent from Levites to magnify the religious credentials of Moses.

It has been proposed by several biblical scholars that Ichabod and Jacob may ultimately be linguistic corruptions of Jochebed.

== Family tree ==
Levi	Adinah (Note: In the Masoretic Text, Levi's wife is not named. She is called Adinah in the Book of Jasher (Chapter 45, verses 5-6), which also says that she was a daughter of Jobab, the son of Yoktan, the son of Eber.)
Gershon	Kehath	Merari
Libni	Shimei	Izhar	Hebron	Uzziel	Mahli	Mushi
Jochebed (Note: Jochebed is described as Levi's daughter, and thus her husband Amram's aunt, in the Book of Numbers (Numbers 26:59), the Masoretic Text of Exodus 6:20 and the Book of Jasher (Chapter 67, verses 2-3). However, some manuscripts of the Septuagint Book of Exodus instead call her Amram's father's cousin, and others state that she was Amram's cousin.)	Amram	Mishael	Elzaphan	Zithri
Miriam	Aaron	Moses	Zipporah
Gershom	Eliezer

== Islamic view ==
The Quran relates the story of Moses in Islam (Arabic: موسى, romanized: Mūsà) with some added details and slight differences as well as the parting of the Red Sea, the burning bush, and the Ten Commandments. Ayarkha or Ayarakht, as Islamic exegesis gives her name, and her efforts to save the baby Moses are parts of this narrative.

Stories of unusual events during the pregnancy of Amina bint Wahb, mother of Muhammad, are compared with the similar experiences of Yocheved when she was carrying Moses. The significance of this comparison is understood to spring from the affinity of Arabic folklore for Hebrew traditions.

== In popular culture ==
The film The Ten Commandments calls her "Yoshebel". She was portrayed by Martha Scott.

She appears briefly in The Prince of Egypt under the name 'Yocheved', voiced by (and resembling) Israeli vocalist Ofra Haza. In the film, she sings a lullaby to baby Moses as she sets the basket carrying him adrift in the river, also pleading the river to deliver Moses "somewhere he can live free". Ofra sang the lullaby in 18 languages for the film's dubbing (including her native language Hebrew). In the 2020 West End adaptation of the film, Yocheved was portrayed by Swedish actress and singer Mercedesz Csampai.

In 2014 film Exodus: Gods and Kings, she was portrayed by British Actress Anna Savva. She was only shown onscreen at the time that Moses was exiled and got to meet his biological mother.

== See also ==
- Yocheved Kashi (1929-2022), Iran-born Israeli first woman paratrooper in the Israel Defense Forces
