= Gershon =

Biblical character

According to the Torah, Gershon (Hebrew: גֵּרְשׁוֹן Gērǝšôn) was the eldest of the sons of Levi, and the patriarchal founder of the Gershonites, one of the four main divisions among the Levites in biblical times. The Gershonites were charged with the care of the outer tabernacle including components such as the tent and its covering, screens, doors, and hangings. Biblical scholars regard the name as being essentially the same as "Gershom" (גֵּרְשֹׁם Gēršōm), which appears to mean "a sojourner there" (גר שם), and it is Gershom rather than Gershon who is sometimes listed in the Book of Chronicles as a founder of one of the principal Levite factions. The Torah names Gershon's sons as Libni and Shimei.

Textual scholars attribute the genealogy to the Book of Generations, a document originating from a religiopolitical group similar to that behind the Priestly source, and at a similar date. According to some biblical scholars, the Torah's genealogy for Levi's descendants is actually reflecting the fact that there were four different groups among the Levites — the Gershonites, the Kohathites, the Merarites, and the Aaronids.

== Family tree ==
Jochebed's position in the family tree of Gershon is uncertain. Some manuscripts of the Septuagint version of the Torah state that Jochebed was Kohath's cousin, but the Masoretic Text states that she was Kohath's sister—Amram's aunt—although Jochebed's relationship to Levi is not explicitly stated.

Thus, according to the Septuagint, Gershon's family tree would be as follows:

Levi	(unnamed)
Gershon	Kohath	Merari	Jochebed
Amram	Izhar	Hebron	Uzziel
Miriam	Aaron	Moses

while according to the Masoretic Text, Gershon's family tree would be as follows:

Levi
Gershon	Kohath	Merari	Jochebed
Libni	Shimei	Amram	Izhar	Hebron	Uzziel
Miriam	Aaron	Moses
