= Amram =

Father of Moses, Aaron and Miriam in the Bible

- עַמְרָם
- Born: 14th–13th century BCE
- Other names: عمرام (Arabic: Christianity)
- Known for: Father of Aaron, Moses, and Miriam in the Book of Exodus
- Spouse: Jochebed
- Children: Aaron; Moses; Miriam
- Parent: Father: Kehath (according to the Masoretic Text)
- Relatives: Cousin and/or aunt (according to various interpretations): Jochebed; Brothers: Izhar, Hebron, Uzziel

In the Book of Exodus, Amram (/ˈæmræm/; Hebrew: עַמְרָם, Modern: ‘Amram, Tiberian: ʻAmrām, "Exalted people" / "The people are exalted") is the husband of Jochebed and father of Aaron, Moses and Miriam.

== In the Holy Scriptures ==
In addition to being married to Jochebed, Amram is also described in the Bible as having been related to Jochebed prior to the marriage, although the exact relationship is uncertain; some Greek and Latin manuscripts of the Septuagint state that Jochebed was Amram's father's cousin, and others state that Amram was Jochebed's cousin, but the Masoretic Text states that she was his father's sister. He is praised for his faith in the Epistle to the Hebrews.

Textual scholars attribute the biblical genealogy to the Book of Generations, a hypothetically reconstructed document theorized to originate from a similar religiopolitical group and date to the priestly source. According to critical scholars, the Torah's genealogy for Levi's descendants, is actually an aetiological myth reflecting the fact that there were four different groups among the Levites – the Gershonites, Kohathites, Merarites, and Aaronids; Aaron – the eponymous ancestor of the Aaronids – could not be portrayed as a brother to Gershon, Kohath, and Merari, as the narrative about the birth of Moses (brother of Aaron), which textual scholars attribute to the earlier Elohist source, mentions only that both his parents were Levites (without identifying their names). Critical scholars suspect that the Elohist account offers both matrilineal and patrilineal descent from Levites in order to magnify the religious credentials of Moses.

== Family tree ==
Levi	Adinah (Note: In the Masoretic Text, Levi's wife is not named. She is called Adina in the Septuagint and Adinah in the Book of Jasher (Chapter 45, verses 5-6), which also says that she was a daughter of Jobab, the son of Yoktan, the son of Eber.)
Gershon	Kehath	Merari
Libni	Shimei	Izhar	Hebron	Uzziel	Mahli	Mushi
Jochebed (Note: Jochebed is described as Levi's daughter, and thus her husband Amram's aunt, in the Book of Numbers (Numbers 26:59), the Masoretic Text of Exodus 6:20 and the Book of Jasher (Chapter 67, verses 2-3). However, some manuscripts of the Septuagint Book of Exodus instead call her Amram's father's cousin, and others state that she was Amram's cousin.)	Amram	Mishael	Elzaphan	Zithri
Miriam	Aaron	Moses	Zipporah
Gershom	Eliezer

== In rabbinical and apocryphal literature ==
In the Apocryphal Testament of Levi, it is stated that Amram was born as a grandson of Levi when Levi was 64 years old. The Exodus Rabbah argues that when the Pharaoh instructed midwives to throw male children into the Nile, Amram divorced Jochebed, who was three months pregnant with Moses at the time, arguing that there was no justification for the Israelite men to father children if they were just to be killed; however, the text goes on to state that Miriam, his daughter, chided him for his lack of care for his wife's feelings, persuading him to recant and marry Jochebed again. According to the Talmud, Amram promulgated the laws of marriage and divorce amongst the Jews in Egypt; the Talmud also argues that Amram had extreme longevity, which he used to ensure that doctrines were preserved through several generations.

Despite the legend of his divorce and remarriage, Amram was also held to have been entirely sinless throughout his life and was rewarded for this by his corpse remaining without any signs of decay. The other three ancient Israelites who died without sin, being Benjamin, Jesse and Chileab.

According to the Book of Jubilees, Amram was among the Israelites who took the bones of Jacob's sons (excluding those of Joseph) to Canaan for burial in the cave of Machpelah. Most of the Israelites then returned to Egypt but some remained in Canaan. Those who remained included Amram, who only returned somewhere up to forty years later.

One of the Dead Sea Scrolls (4Q544, Manuscript B) is written from Amram's point of view, and hence has been dubbed the Visions of Amram. The document is dated to the 2nd century BC and, in the form of a vision, briefly discusses dualism and the Watchers:

I saw Watchers in my vision, the dream-vision. Two men were fighting over me...holding a great contest over me. I asked them, 'Who are you, that you are thus empowered over me?' They answered, 'We have been empowered and rule over all mankind.' They said to me, 'Which of us do you choose to rule you?' I raised my eyes and looked. One of them was terrifying in his appearance, like a serpent, his cloak, many-colored yet very dark....And I looked again, and in his appearance, his visage like a viper....I replied to him, 'This Watcher, who is he?' He answered, 'This Watcher...his three names are Belial and Prince of Darkness and King of Evil.' I said (to the other Watcher), 'My lord, what dominion (have you?)' He answered, 'You saw (the viper), and he is empowered over all Darkness, while I (am empowered over all Light.)...My three names are Michael, Prince of Light and King of Righteousness.
