= Kehath =

Biblical character

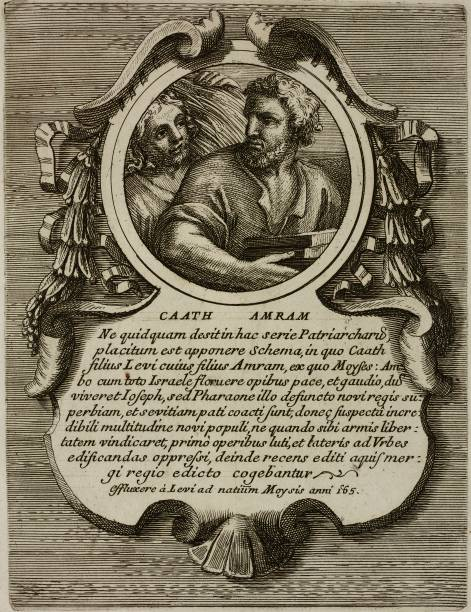
Kohath with his son Amram in Epitome historico-chronologica by Bartolomeo Gai

According to the Torah, Kehath (Hebrew: קְהָת, Qəhāṯ) or Kohath was the second of the sons of Levi and the patriarchal founder of the Kehathites, one of the four main divisions of the Levites in biblical times. In some apocryphal texts, such as the Testament of Levi and the Book of Jubilees, Levi's wife, Kehath's mother, is Milkah, a daughter of Aram.

== Onomastics ==
According to biblical scholars, the meaning of Kehath's name is unknown, though it may derive from an Aramaic word meaning obey.

In the Testament of Levi, Kehath's birth when his father Levi was 35 years old was accompanied by a vision of Kehath "on high in the midst of all the congregation"; in the vision, Kehath's name is given as meaning "the beginning of majesty and instruction" and prophesies his being raised above his siblings.

== Genealogy ==
In the Book of Exodus, Kehath has four sons, Amram, Izhar, Hebron and Uzziel. Amram marries Jochebed and sires Moses, Aaron, and Miriam. Although some Greek and Latin manuscripts of the Septuagint version of the Torah state that Jochebed was Kehath's cousin, the Hebrew Masoretic Text states that she was his sister—that is, Amram's aunt—and Jochebed's relationship to Levi is otherwise described unambiguously as his daughter in the Book of Numbers 26:59. According to Numbers, Kehath gained 8,600 descendants during the lifetime of his grandson. However these names were prominent clans, and not always direct linear descendants as expected in western genealogies.

== Theories ==
Julius Wellhausen's documentary hypothesis asserts that the Torah was compiled in the fifth century BC from several independent, contradictory, hypothetical (nonextant) documents, including the Jahwist, Elohist, Deuteronomic, and priestly sources and the Book of Generations. Advocates of this hypothesis, such as Richard Elliott Friedman, attribute Levi's biblical genealogy to the "Book of Generations". Others attribute Moses's birth narrative, which also mentions Amram and Jochebed, to the earlier "Elohist source". According to this theory, the Levite genealogy is a myth to explain away the fact that four different groups claimed descent from Levi—the Gershonites, Kehathites, Merarites, and Aaronides. Since Aaron could not have been a brother to Gershon, Kehath, and Merari, since he was the son of one of Kehath's sons, he had to belong to a following generation. The hypothetical reconstruction of the "Elohist source" mentions only that both parents were Levites without identifying their names (Exodus 2:1–2). Some scholars suspect that the "Elohist source" attributes to Moses both matrilineal and patrilineal descent from Levites in order to enhance his religious credentials.

== Family tree ==
According to the Book of Genesis and the Book of Exodus Kohath's family tree looks like this:

Levi | Adinah (Note: In the Masoretic Text, Levi's wife is not named. She is called Adinah in the Book of Jasher (Chapter 45, verses 5-6), which also says that she was a daughter of Jobab, the son of Yoktan, the son of Eber.)
Gershon | Kehath | Merari
Libni | Shimei | Izhar | Hebron | Uzziel | Mahli | Mushi
Jochebed (Note: Jochebed is described as Levi's daughter, and thus her husband Amram's aunt, in the Book of Numbers (Numbers 26:59), the Masoretic Text of Exodus 6:20 and the Book of Jasher (Chapter 67, verses 2-3). However, some manuscripts of the Septuagint Book of Exodus instead call her Amram's father's cousin, and others state that she was Amram's cousin.) | Amram | Mishael | Elzaphan | Zithri
Miriam | Aaron | Moses | Zipporah
Gershom | Eliezer

== See also ==
- Kohathites
- Testament of Kohath
