= Ramathite =

Designation given to Shimei in the Bible

Ramathite was the designation given to Shimei, the manager of David's vineyard (1 Chronicles 27:27).
