= Levi =

Biblical figure and son of Jacob and Leah

- לֵוִי
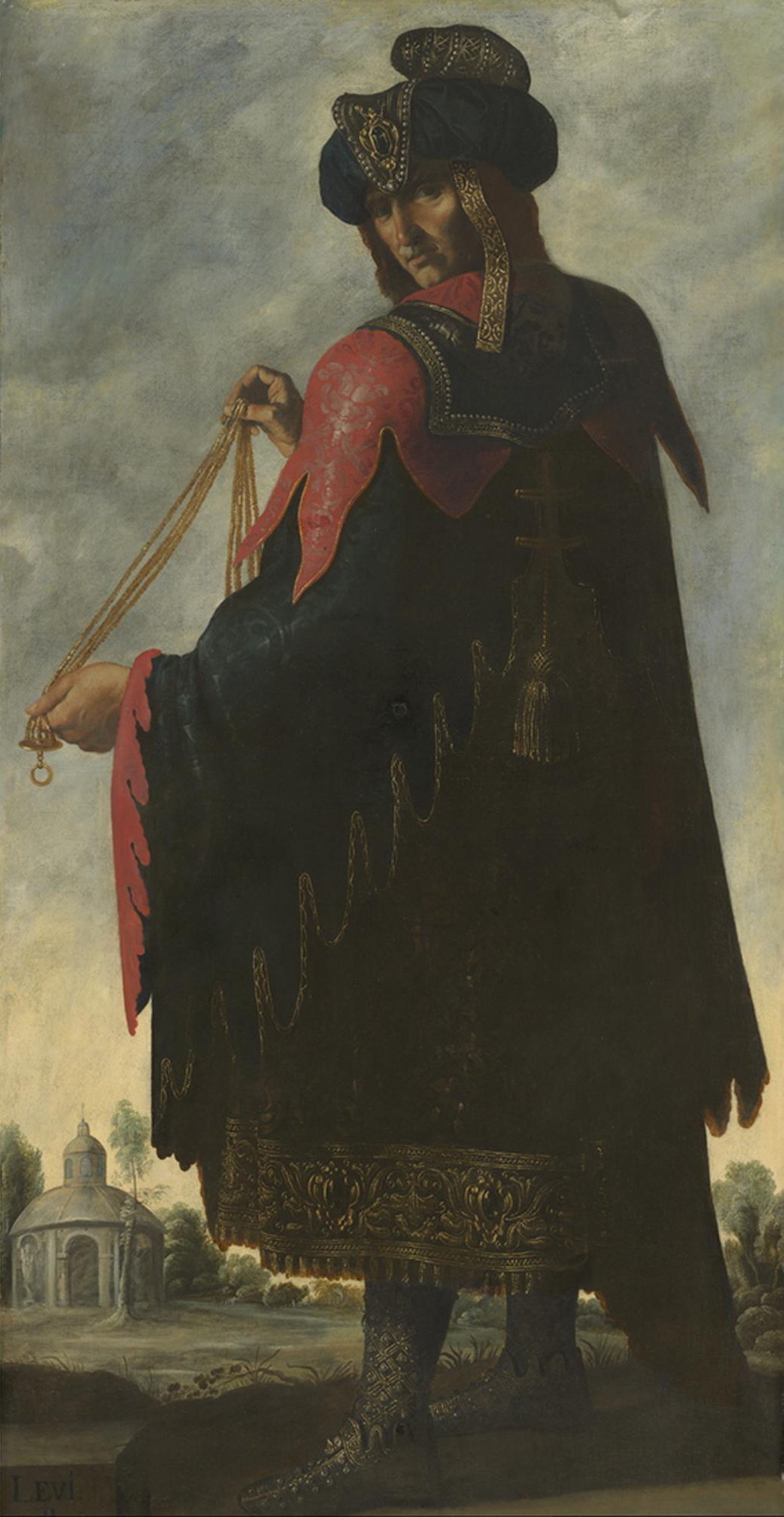
- Levi, from the series Jacob and His Twelve Sons (c. 1640 – c. 1645), by Francisco de Zurbarán
- Born: 1 or 16 Nisan; Paddan Aram, Aram-Naharaim (present-day Harran, Turkey)
- Died: 1431, 1430 or 1429 BC (AM 2331 or AM 2332) (aged 137)
- Spouse: Adinah
- Children: Gershon (son); Kehath (son); Merari (son); Jochebed (daughter)
- Parents: Jacob (father); Leah (mother)
- Relatives: Reuben (brother); Simeon (brother); Judah (brother); Dan (half brother); Naphtali (half brother); Gad (half brother); Asher (half brother); Issachar (brother); Zebulun (brother); Dinah (sister); Joseph (half brother); Benjamin (half brother); Rachel (aunt/stepmother)

Levi (/ˈliːvaɪ/ LEE-vy; Hebrew: לֵוִי, Modern: Levī, Tiberian: Lēwī) was, according to the Book of Genesis, the third of the six sons of Jacob and Leah, and the founder of the Israelite Tribe of Levi (the Levites, including the Kohanim) and the great-grandfather of Aaron, Moses and Miriam. Certain religious and political functions were reserved for the Levites.

Most scholars view the Torah as projecting the origins of the Levites into the past to explain their role as landless cultic functionaries.

== Origins ==
In the Torah, Leah conceived again after the births of Reuben and Simeon,

and when she gave birth to a son, she said, "Now at last my husband will become attached to me, because I have borne him three sons." So he was named Levi.

Her reported statement suggests that the name Levi refers to her hope for Jacob to be "joined" or "attached" to her, implying a derivation from Hebrew yillaweh, meaning he will join. Some scholars suspect that it may simply mean "priest", either as a loanword or by referring to those people who were joined to the Ark of the Covenant. Another possibility is that the Levites were a tribe of Judah not from the clan of Moses or Aaron and that the name "Levites" indicates their joining – either with the Israelites in general or with the earlier Israelite priesthood in particular.

== Levi and the "Blessing of Jacob" ==
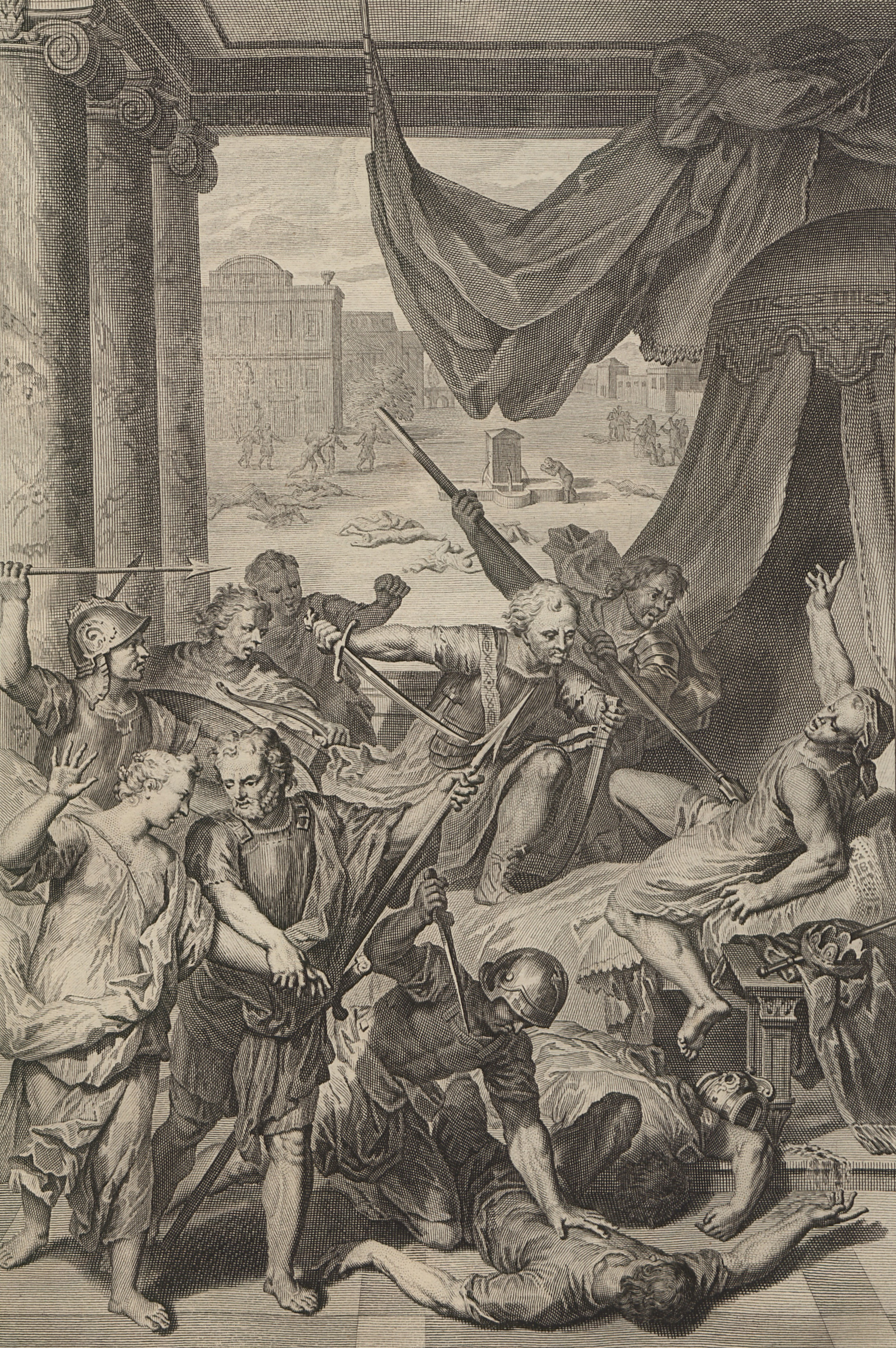
Simeon and Levi slay Hamor and Shechem

In the Book of Genesis, Levi and his brother, Simeon, raid the city of Shechem in revenge for the rape of Dinah, seizing the wealth of the city and massacring the men. The brothers had earlier misled the inhabitants by consenting to Dinah's rapist marrying her in exchange for the men of the city to be circumcised. When Jacob hears about their deceit and destruction of Shechem, he scolds them since they have exposed their own family to the wrath of neighbouring societies. In the Blessing of Jacob, Jacob is described as imposing a curse on the Levites, by which they would be scattered, in punishment for Levi's actions in Shechem. According to W. Carleton Wood, military defeat by the Canaanites was the cause for the dispersal of the Levites.

Some textual scholars date the Blessing of Jacob to a period between one and two centuries before the Babylonian captivity, and some Biblical scholars regard the curse, and Dinah herself, as an aetiological postdiction to explain the fates of the tribe of Simeon and the Levites, with one possible explanation of the Levites' scattered nature being that the priesthood was originally open to any tribe but gradually became seen as a distinct tribe itself. Nevertheless, Isaac, Levi's grandfather, gives a special blessing about the lineage of priests of God.

== The family of Levi ==
In the Book of Genesis, Levi is described as having fathered three sons, Gershon, Kohath, and Merari. A similar genealogy is given in the Book of Exodus, where it is added that among Kohath's sons was one, Amram, who married a woman named Jochebed, who was closely related to his father, and they were the biological parents of Moses, Aaron, and Miriam; though some Greek and Latin manuscripts of the Torah state that Jochebed was Amram's father's cousin, the Masoretic Text states that she was his father's sister, and the Septuagint mentions that she was one of his father's sisters. The Masoretic Text's version of Levi's genealogy thus implies (and in Numbers 26:59, explicitly states) that Levi also had a daughter (Jochebed), and the Septuagint implies further daughters. The names of Levi's sons, and possible daughter, are interpreted in classical rabbinical literature as being reflections on their future destiny. In some apocryphal texts such as the Testaments of the Twelve Patriarchs, and the Book of Jubilees, Levi's wife, his children's mother, is named as Milkah, a daughter of Aram, but according to the Book of Jasher, the name of Levi's wife was Adinah.

=== Family tree ===
Levi	Adinah (Note: In the Masoretic Text, Levi's wife is not named. She is called Adinah in the Book of Jasher (Chapter 45, verses 5-6), which also says that she was a daughter of Jobab, the son of Yoktan, the son of Eber.)
Gershon	Kehath	Merari
Libni	Shimei	Izhar	Hebron	Uzziel	Mahli	Mushi
Jochebed (Note: Jochebed is described as Levi's daughter, and thus her husband Amram's aunt, in the Book of Numbers (Numbers 26:59), the Masoretic Text of Exodus 6:20 and the Book of Jasher (Chapter 67, verses 2-3). However, some manuscripts of the Septuagint Book of Exodus instead call her Amram's father's cousin, and others state that she was Amram's cousin.)	Amram	Mishael	Elzaphan	Zithri
Miriam	Aaron	Moses	Zipporah
Gershom	Eliezer

== In post-Torah tradition ==
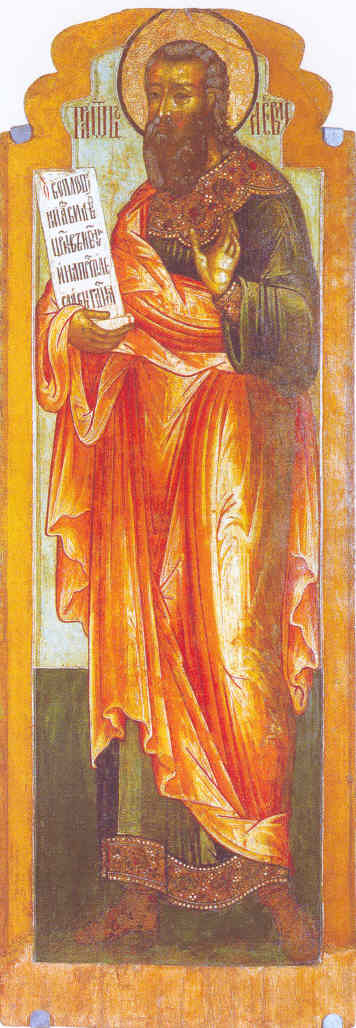
Levi, Russian icon

The Book of Jubilees states that Levi was born "in the new moon of the first month", which means that he was born on 1 Nisan.

In accordance with his role as founder of the Levites, Levi is referred to as being particularly pious. The Blessing of Moses, which some textual scholars attribute to a period just before the deuteronomist, speaks about Levi via an allegorical comparison to Moses himself, which haggadah take to support the characterization of Levi (and his progeny) as being by far the greatest of his brothers in respect to piety. The apocryphal Prayer of Asenath, which textual scholars believe dates from some time after the first century AD, describes Levi as a prophet and saint who is able to forecast the future and understand heavenly writings, and as someone who admonishes the people to forgive and to be in awe of God. The Book of Malachi argues that Yahweh chose the Levites to be priests because Levi, as God's minister, embodied true religious principles, possessed reverence for Yahweh, held the divine name in awe, upheld peace, provided a model of good morality, and turned many people away from sin.

=== Testament of Levi ===
The Testament of Levi is believed to have been written between 153 BC and 107 BC, and closer to the latter date. On his deathbed, Levi gathered all his children to narrate the story of his life to them, and prophesied unto them what they would do, and what would happen to them until judgment day. He also told them that God had chosen him and his seed as priest of Lord unto eternity. In this testament, Levi is described as having had two visions. The first vision covered eschatological issues, portraying the seven heavens, the Jewish Messiah, and Judgement Day. The second vision portrays seven angels bringing Levi seven insignia signifying priesthood, prophecy, and judgement; in the vision, after the angels anoint Levi, and initiate him as a priest, they tell him of the future of his descendants, mentioning Moses, the Aaronid priesthood, and a time when there would be priest-kings; this latter point was of particular interest to the Maccabean period of John Hyrcanus, who was both a high priest, and warrior-king.

The Book of Jubilees similarly has Isaac telling Levi of the future of his descendants, again predicting priesthood, prophets, and political power, and additionally describes Jacob as entrusting Levi with the secrets of the ancients, so that they would be known only to the Levites; however, like the Testament of Levi, the Book of Jubilees is regarded as a Maccabean-era document.

== Tomb ==
A Samaritan tradition recorded in the late 19th century considered Neby Lawin, just north of Silat ad-Dhahr, to be the burial place of Levi.

== See also ==
- Levite
- Miscegenation
- Tribe of Levi
- Lévai (surname originating from the Tribe of Levi)
