= Yocheved Kashi =

Israeli military officer (1929–2022)

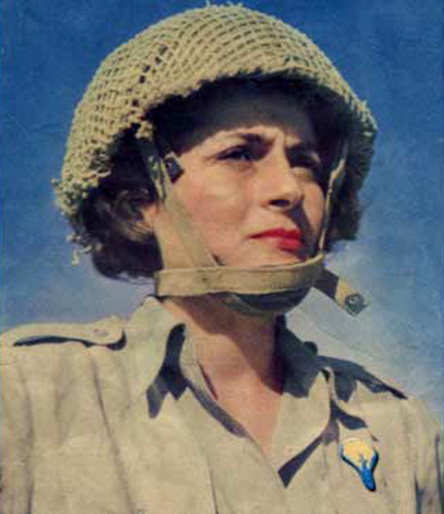
Kashi in 1950

Yocheved Kashi (Hebrew: יוכבד קאשי; 1929 – 3 November 2022) was the commander of the Parachute Folding Unit of the Israel Defence Forces, and was the first woman paratrooper in the Israel Defense Forces.

== Biography ==
=== Early years ===
Kashi was born in Mashhad, Iran. Her parents emigrated from Russian Central Asia to Iran before she was born and settled in the city of Mashhad. When Kashi was 3 years old, in 1932, the family immigrated to Israel and settled in Tel Aviv. At the age of 17, Kashi joined the underground organization Haganah.

== Military career ==
In May 1948, Kashi enlisted in the IDF Women's Corps and served as a lieutenant colonel and instructor. In 1950, she completed the officers' course, after which she was stationed at the parachuting school, and later at the Tel Nof Airbase. There, she commanded the parachute folding unit.

Kashi applied to take a skydiving course, but was rejected on the grounds of gender. The head of the IDF Women's Corps at the time, Col. Susana Werner, claimed that being a paratrooper was a profession restricted to men, and declined to give her approval. The physicians at the Paratroopers Brigade claimed that skydiving could cause damage to the female body, which could prevent in the future the possibility of carrying a successful pregnancy. Kashi insisted and finally managed, with the help of examples of paratroopers from other countries, to convince Yehuda Harari, the founder and commander of the parachuting school, to accept her. Menucha Fidel from moshav Hogla, also volunteered to join the course and the two women passed it successfully, becoming the first women to take a parachuting course in the IDF and completed it after five jumps. Kashi and Fidel participated in the parachute parade at Ramat Gan Stadium, at the opening ceremony of the 1950 Maccabiah Games.

Parachutists demonstration at the opening of the III Macabbiah. Kashi is one of the soldiers participating.

However, Kashi wanted to become a paratrooper, and continued doing jumps, until she completed the required 12 successful jumps, which gave her the paratrooper wings badge and which made her the first female paratrooper of the IDF. A photo of Kashi appeared on an Independence Day poster in 1951.

Kashi was honorably discharged from military service in 1952, with the rank of lieutenant colonel.

== After the army ==
After being discharged in 1952, Kashi married the painter Zvi Milstein. The couple moved to France after Milstein received a scholarship to study in France in 1956. Yocheved taught plastic arts at a university in Paris.

== Family ==
Yocheved Kashi was the older sister of the singer Aliza Kashi. Kashi and Milstein's son, Uri, is a film producer and lives in France. Kashi lived in a nursing home in Normandy after Milstein died in 2020.
