= Aaron =

Prophet in the Abrahamic faiths

High Priest Aaron
- אַהֳרֹן
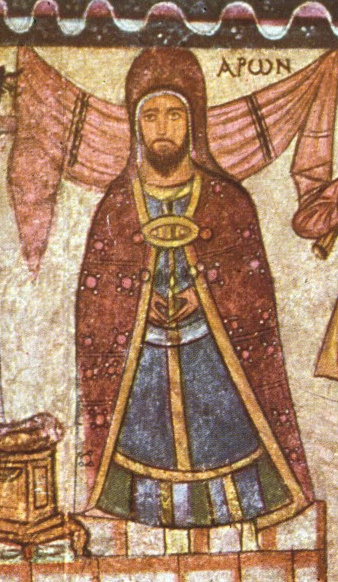
- Aaron in Dura-Europos synagogue c. 256
- Venerated in: Judaism; Christianity; Islam; Samaritanism; Baháʼí Faith; Rastafari
- Title: Prophet; High Priest

Personal life
- Born: Goshen, Lower Egypt, Ancient Egypt
- Died: Mount Hor, near the border of Edom, Transjordan, or Moseroth, near Edom (aged 123 in Jewish traditions)
- Spouse: Elisheba
- Children: Nadab; Abihu; Eleazar; Ithamar
- Parents: Amram (father); Jochebed (mother)
- Relatives: Levi (patrilineal great-grandfather); Miriam (sister); Moses (brother)

Religious life
- Religion: Abrahamic religions

According to the Hebrew Bible, Aaron (Note: Hebrew: אַהֲרֹן, romanized: ʾAhărōn; Arabic: هارون, romanized: Hārūn; Greek (Septuagint): Ἀαρών, romanized: Aarṓn; often called Aaron the priest (אַהֲרֹן הַכֹּהֵן, ʾAhărōn ha-kōhēn).) (/ˈɛərən/ AIR-ən or /ˈærən/ ARR-ən) was an Israelite prophet, high priest, and the elder brother of Moses. Information about Aaron comes exclusively from religious texts, such as the Hebrew Bible, the New Testament (Luke, Acts, and Hebrews), and the Quran.

The Hebrew Bible relates that, unlike Moses, who grew up in the Egyptian royal court, Aaron and his elder sister Miriam remained with their kinsmen in the Land of Goshen. When Moses first confronted the Egyptian king about the enslavement of the Israelites, Aaron served as his brother's spokesman to the Pharaoh. Part of the Law given to Moses at Sinai granted Aaron the priesthood for himself and his male descendants, and he became the first High Priest of Israel. Levitical priests or kohanim are traditionally believed and halakhically required to be of direct patrilineal descent from Aaron.

According to the Book of Numbers, Aaron died at 123 years of age, on Mount Hor, in the fortieth year after the Israelites had come out of the land of Egypt. Deuteronomy, however, places these events at Moseroth.

== Biblical narrative ==
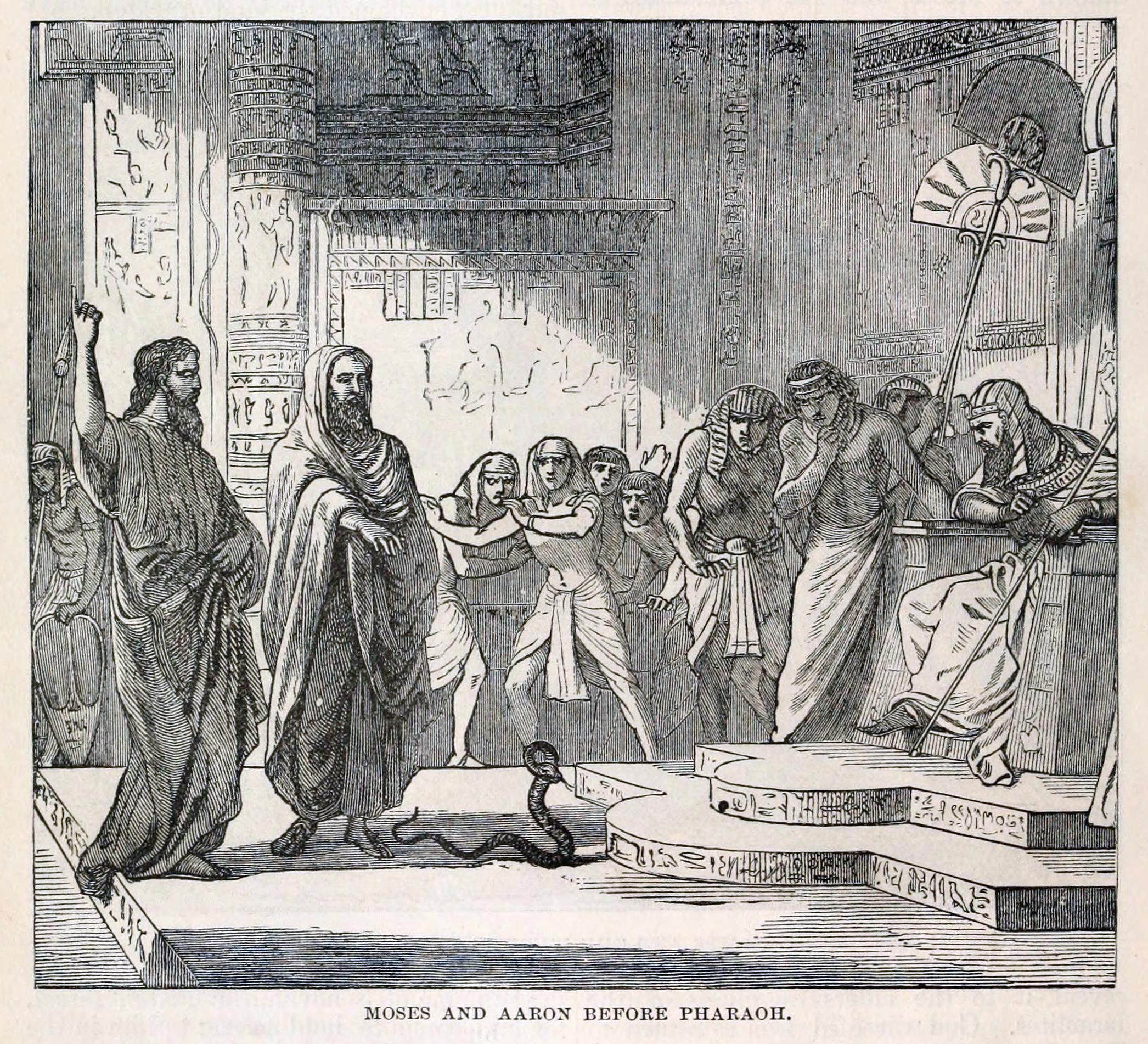
Moses and Aaron before Pharaoh

According to the Book of Exodus, Aaron first functioned as Moses' assistant. Because Moses complained that he could not speak well, God appointed Aaron as Moses' "prophet". (Note: He spoke and acted on behalf of Moses with the Egyptian royal court, including performing miraculous "signs" to validate Moses' mission.) At the command of Moses, he let his rod turn into a snake. Then he stretched out his rod in order to bring on the first three plagues. After that, Moses tended to act and speak for himself.

During the journey in the wilderness, Aaron was not always prominent or active. At the battle with Amalek, he was chosen with Hur to support the hand of Moses that held the "rod of God". When the revelation was given to Moses at Mount Sinai, he headed the elders of Israel who accompanied Moses on the way to the summit. While Joshua went with Moses to the top, however, Aaron and Hur remained below to look after the people. From here on in Exodus, Leviticus and Numbers, Joshua appears in the role of Moses' assistant while Aaron functions instead as the first high priest.

=== High Priest ===
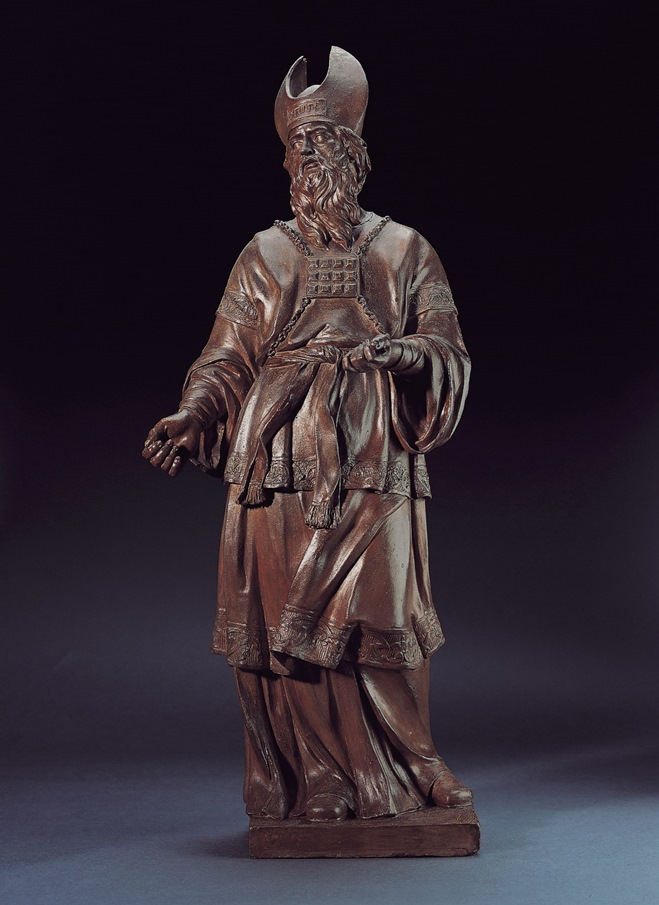
Aaron depicted by Jacques Bergé

The books of Exodus, Leviticus and Numbers maintain that Aaron received from God a monopoly over the priesthood for himself and his male descendants. The family of Aaron had the exclusive right and responsibility to make offerings on the altar to God. The rest of his tribe, the Levites, were given subordinate responsibilities within the sanctuary. Moses anointed and consecrated Aaron and his sons to the priesthood, and arrayed them in the robes of office. He also related to them God's detailed instructions for performing their duties while the rest of the Israelites listened. Aaron and his successors as high priest were given control over the Urim and Thummim by which the will of God could be determined. God commissioned the Aaronide priests to distinguish the holy from the common and the clean from the unclean, and to teach the divine laws (the Torah) to the Israelites. The priests were also commissioned to bless the people. When Aaron completed the altar offerings for the first time and, with Moses, "blessed the people: and the glory of the LORD appeared unto all the people: And there came a fire out from before the LORD, and consumed upon the altar the burnt offering and the fat [which] when all the people saw, they shouted, and fell on their faces". In this way, the institution of the Aaronide priesthood was established.

In later books of the Hebrew Bible, Aaron and his kin are not mentioned very often except in literature dating to the Babylonian captivity and later. The books of Judges, Samuel and Kings mention priests and Levites, but do not mention the Aaronides in particular. The Book of Ezekiel, which devotes much attention to priestly matters, calls the priestly upper class the Zadokites after one of King David's priests. It does reflect a two-tier priesthood with the Levites in subordinate position. A two-tier hierarchy of Aaronides and Levites appears in Ezra, Nehemiah and Chronicles. As a result, many historians think that Aaronide families did not control the priesthood in pre-exilic Israel. What is clear is that high priests claiming Aaronide descent dominated the Second Temple period. Most scholars think the Torah reached its final form early in this period, which may account for Aaron's prominence in Exodus, Leviticus and Numbers.

=== Conflicts ===
Aaron plays a leading role in several stories of conflicts during Israel's wilderness wanderings. During the prolonged absence of Moses on Mount Sinai, the people provoked Aaron to make a golden calf. This incident nearly caused God to destroy the Israelites. Moses successfully intervened, but then led the loyal Levites in executing many of the culprits; a plague afflicted those who were left. Aaron, however, escaped punishment for his role in the affair, because of the intercession of Moses according to Deuteronomy 9:20. Later retellings of this story almost always excuse Aaron for his role. For example, in rabbinic sources and in the Quran, Aaron was not the idol-maker and upon Moses' return begged his pardon because he felt mortally threatened by the Israelites.

On the day of Aaron's consecration, his oldest sons, Nadab and Abihu, were burned up by divine fire because they offered "strange" incense. Most interpreters think this story reflects a conflict between priestly families some time in Israel's past. Others argue that the story simply shows what can happen if the priests do not follow God's instructions given through Moses.

The Torah generally depicts the siblings, Moses, Aaron, and Miriam, as the leaders of Israel after the Exodus, a view also reflected in the biblical Book of Micah. Numbers 12, however, reports that on one occasion, Aaron and Miriam complained about Moses' exclusive claim to be the Lord's prophet. Their presumption was rebuffed by God who affirmed Moses' uniqueness as the one with whom the Lord spoke face to face. Miriam was punished with a skin disease (tzaraath) that turned her skin white. Aaron pleaded with Moses to intercede for her, and Miriam, after seven days' quarantine, was healed. Aaron once again escaped any retribution.

According to Numbers 16–17, a Levite named Korah led many in challenging Aaron's exclusive claim to the priesthood. When the rebels were punished by being swallowed up by the earth, Eleazar, the son of Aaron, was commissioned to take charge of the censers of the dead priests. And when a plague broke out among the people who had sympathized with the rebels, Aaron, at the command of Moses, took his censer and stood between the living and the dead until the plague abated (Numbers 16:36, 17:1), atoning in the process.

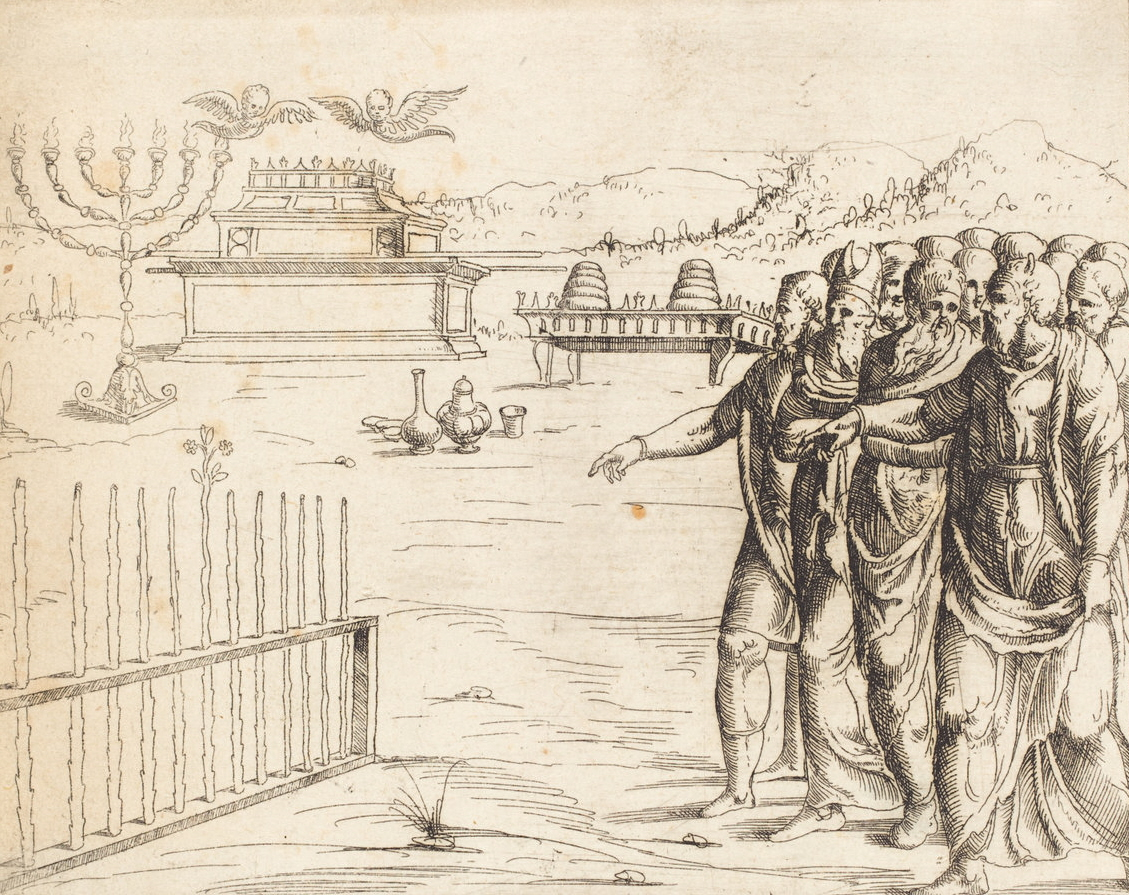
The Blossoming of Aaron's Rod, etching by Augustin Hirschvogel

To emphasize the validity of the Levites' claim to the offerings and tithes of the Israelites, Moses collected a rod from the leaders of each tribe in Israel and laid the twelve rods overnight in the tent of meeting. The next morning, Aaron's rod was found to have budded and blossomed and produced ripe almonds. The rod was then placed before the Ark of the Covenant to symbolize Aaron's right to priesthood. The following chapter then details the distinction between Aaron's family and the rest of the Levites: while all the Levites (and only Levites) were devoted to the care of the sanctuary, charge of its interior and the altar was committed to the Aaronites alone.

=== Death ===
Aaron, like Moses, was not permitted to enter Canaan with the Israelites when Moses brought water out of a rock to quench the people's thirst. Although they had been commanded to speak to the rock, Moses struck it with the staff twice, which was construed as displaying a lack of deference to the Lord.

There are two accounts of the death of Aaron in the Torah. Numbers says that soon after the incident at Meribah, Aaron with his son Eleazar and Moses ascended Mount Hor. There Moses stripped Aaron of his priestly garments and transferred them to Eleazar. Aaron died on the summit of the mountain, and the people mourned him for thirty days. The other account is found in Deuteronomy 10:6, where Aaron died at Moserah and was buried. There is a significant amount of travel between these two points, as the itinerary in Numbers 33:31–37 records seven stages between Moseroth (Mosera) and Mount Hor. Aaron died on the 1st of Av and was 123 at the time of his death.

=== Descendants ===
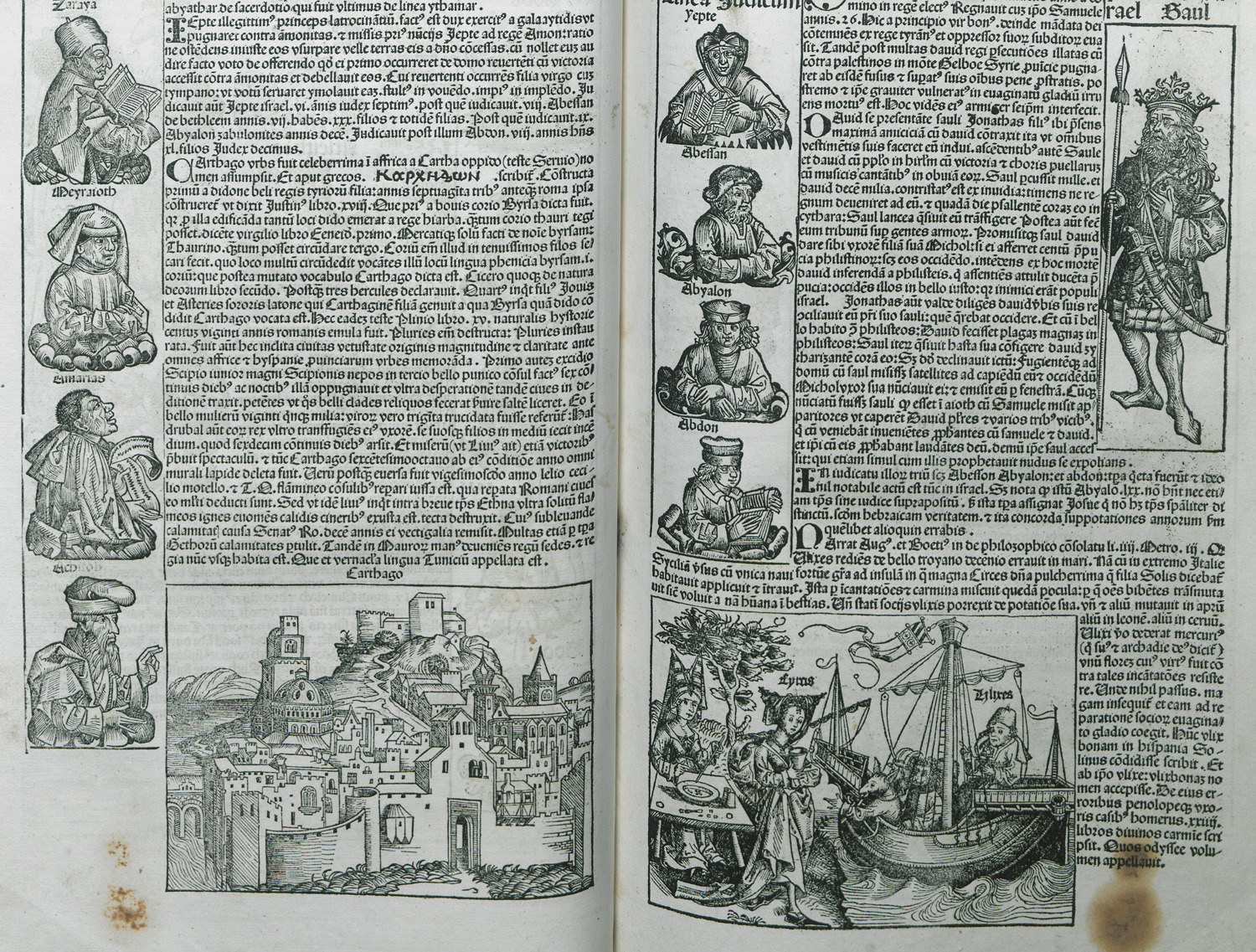
Aaron's descendants including Zerahiah, Meraioth, Amaziah and Ahitub.

Aaron married Elisheba, daughter of Amminadab and sister of Nahshon of the tribe of Judah. The sons of Aaron were Nadab, Abihu, Eleazar and Ithamar; (Note: Now these are the divisions of the sons of Aaron. The sons of Aaron; Nadab, and Abihu, Eleazar, and Ithamar.) only the latter two had progeny. A descendant of Aaron is an Aaronite, or Kohen, meaning Priest. Any non-Aaronic Levite—i.e., descended from Levi but not from Aaron—assisted the Levitical priests of the family of Aaron in the care of the tabernacle; later of the temple. (Note: According to Samaritan sources, a civil war once broke out between the sons of Itamar Eli (Bible) and the sons of Phineas (son of Eleazar) that resulted in a division of those who followed Eli and those who followed High Priest Uzzi ben Bukki at Mount Gerizim Bethel. (A third group followed neither.) Ironically, and likewise according to Samaritan sources, the high priests' line of the sons of Phineas died out in 1624 CE with the death of the 112th High Priest, Shlomyah ben Pinhas, at which time the priesthood was transferred to the sons of Itamar. See article Samaritan for list of High Priests from 1613 to 2004—the 131st high priest of the Samaritans is Elazar ben Tsedaka ben Yitzhaq. Also see article, Samaritan)

The Gospel of Luke records that both Zechariah and Elizabeth and therefore their son John the Baptist were descendants of Aaron.

=== Family tree ===
Levi	Adinah (Note: In the Masoretic Text, Levi's wife is not named. She is called Adinah in the Book of Jasher (Chapter 45, verses 5-6), which also says that she was a daughter of Jobab, the son of Yoktan, the son of Eber.)
Gershon	Kehath	Merari
Libni	Shimei	Izhar	Hebron	Uzziel	Mahli	Mushi
Jochebed (Note: Jochebed is described as Levi's daughter, and thus her husband Amram's aunt, in the Book of Numbers (Numbers 26:59), the Masoretic Text of Exodus 6:20 and the Book of Jasher (Chapter 67, verses 2-3). However, some manuscripts of the Septuagint Book of Exodus instead call her Amram's father's cousin, and others state that she was Amram's cousin.)	Amram	Mishael	Elzaphan	Zithri
Miriam	Aaron	Moses	Zipporah
Gershom	Eliezer

== Historicity ==
Thomas Römer argues that external evidence and biblical texts suggest the Pentateuch reflects tensions among three groups: (1) a lay group aligned with Moses, (2) a priestly group linked to Aaron, and (3) the Levites. These tensions, particularly evident during the Persian and early Hellenistic periods, are seen in conflicting narratives concerning the roles of both Moses and Aaron. Compromises are evident in texts like Exodus and Leviticus, where Moses and Aaron work together, though Moses is dominant. Disagreements persisted, with some texts emphasizing Moses's superiority and others elevating Aaron's status. The Pentateuch ultimately preserves these unresolved conflicts while portraying Moses as the unparalleled mediator of the Torah (Deut. 34:10–12).

== In religious traditions ==
=== Jewish rabbinic literature ===
The older prophets and prophetical writers beheld in their priests the representatives of a religious form inferior to the prophetic truth; men without the spirit of God and lacking the willpower requisite to resist the multitude in its idolatrous proclivities. Thus Aaron, the first priest, ranks below Moses: he is his mouthpiece, and the executor of the will of God revealed through Moses, although it is written fifteen times in the Torah that "the Lord spoke to Moses and Aaron."

Under the influence of the priesthood that shaped the destinies of the nation under Persian rule, a different ideal of the priest was formed, according to Malachi 2:4–7, and the prevailing tendency was to place Aaron on a footing equal with Moses. "At times Aaron, and at other times Moses, is mentioned first in Scripture—this is to show that they were of equal rank," says the Mekhilta of Rabbi Ishmael, which strongly implies this when introducing in its record of renowned men the glowing description of Aaron's ministration.

In fulfillment of the promise of peaceful life, symbolized by the pouring of oil upon his head, Aaron's death, as described in the aggadah, was of a wonderful tranquility. Accompanied by Moses, his brother, and by Eleazar, his son, Aaron went to the summit of Mount Hor, where the rock suddenly opened before him and a beautiful cave lit by a lamp presented itself to his view. Moses said, "Take off thy priestly raiment and place it upon thy son Eleazar!" said Moses; "and then follow me." Aaron did as commanded; and they entered the cave, where was prepared a bed around which angels stood. "Go lie down upon thy bed, my brother," Moses continued; and Aaron obeyed without a murmur. Then his soul departed as if by a kiss from God. The cave closed behind Moses as he left; and he went down the hill with Eleazar, with garments rent, and crying: "Alas, Aaron, my brother! thou, the pillar of supplication of Israel!" When the Israelites cried in bewilderment, "Where is Aaron?" angels were seen carrying Aaron's bier through the air. A voice was then heard saying: "The law of truth was in his mouth, and iniquity was not found on his lips: he walked with me in righteousness, and brought many back from sin." He died on the first of Av. The pillar of cloud which proceeded in front of Israel's camp disappeared at Aaron's death. The seeming contradiction between Numbers 20:22 et seq. and Deuteronomy 10:6 is solved by the rabbis in the following manner: Aaron's death on Mount Hor was marked by the defeat of the people in a war with the king of Arad, in consequence of which the Israelites fled, marching seven stations backward to Mosera, where they performed the rites of mourning for Aaron; wherefore it is said: "There [at Mosera] died Aaron." (Note: See Mekhilta, Beshallaḥ, Vayassa, 1; Tanhuma, Hukkat, 18; Yerushalmi Sotah, 1 17c, and Targum Pseudo-Jonathan Numbers and Deuteronomy on the above mentioned passages.)

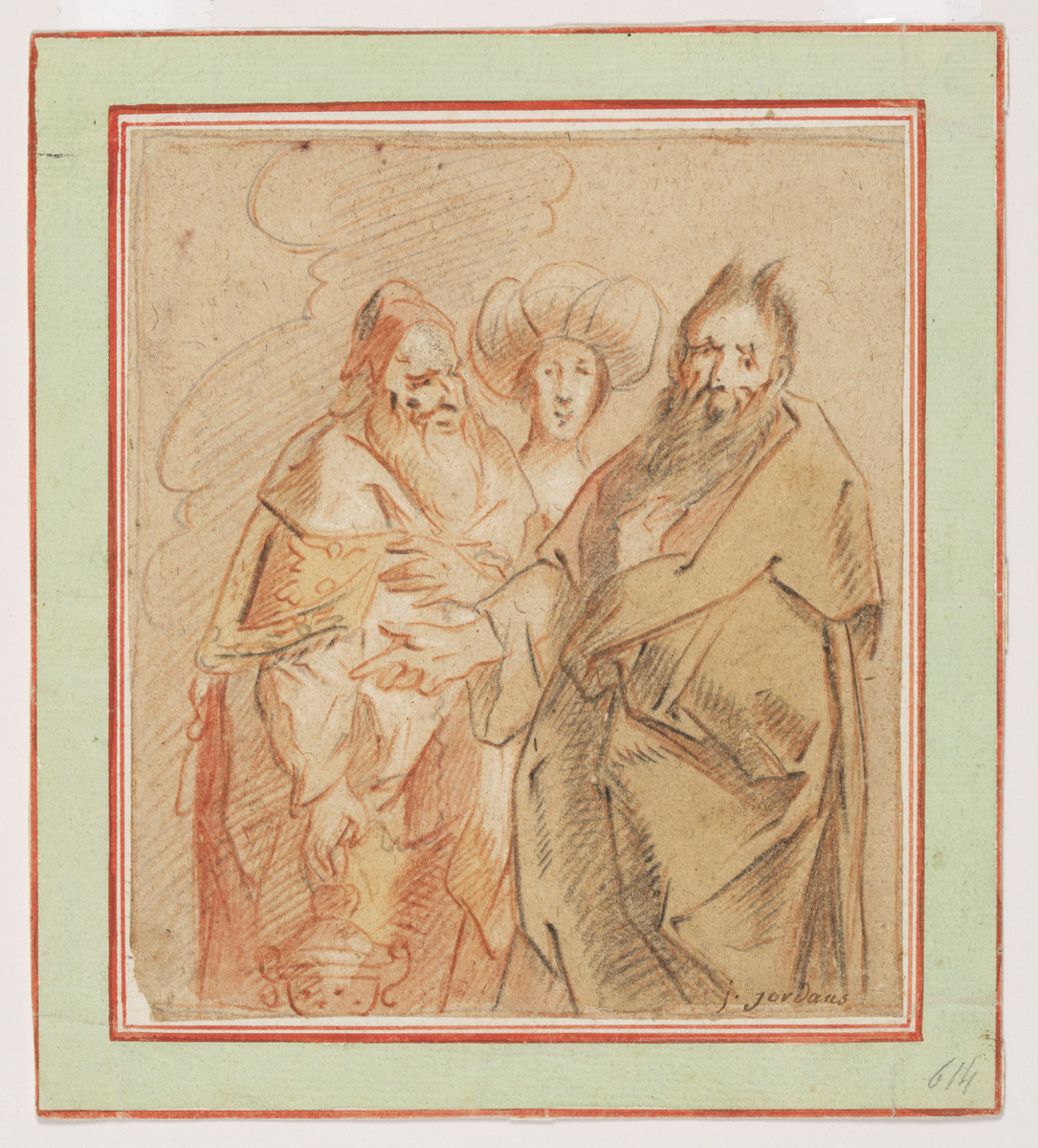
Aaron, Miriam and Moses, chalk drawing c 1650, Jacob Jordaens

The rabbis particularly praise the brotherly sentiment between Aaron and Moses. When Moses was appointed ruler and Aaron high priest, neither betrayed any jealousy; instead they rejoiced in each other's greatness. When Moses at first declined to go to Pharaoh, saying: "O my Lord, send, I pray, by the hand of him whom you will send", he was unwilling to deprive Aaron of the high position the latter had held for so many years; but the Lord reassured him, saying: "Behold, when he sees you, he will be glad in his heart." Indeed, Aaron was to find his reward, says Shimon bar Yochai; for that heart which had leaped with joy over his younger brother's rise to glory greater than his was decorated with the Urim and Thummim, which were to "be upon Aaron's heart when he goeth in before the Lord". Moses and Aaron met in gladness of heart, kissing each other as true brothers, and of them it is written: "Behold how good and how pleasant [it is] for brethren to dwell together in unity!" Of them it is said: "Mercy and truth are met together; righteousness and peace have kissed [each other]"; for Moses stood for righteousness and Aaron for peace. Again, mercy was personified in Aaron, according to Deuteronomy 33:8, and truth in Moses, according to Numbers 12:7.

When Moses poured the oil of anointment upon the head of Aaron, Aaron modestly shrank back and said: "Who knows whether I have not cast some blemish upon this sacred oil so as to forfeit this high office." Then the Shekhinah spoke the words: "Behold the precious ointment upon the head, that ran down upon the beard of Aaron, that even went down to the skirts of his garment, is as pure as the dew of Hermon."

According to Tanhuma, Aaron's activity as a prophet began earlier than that of Moses. Hillel held Aaron up as an example, saying: "Be of the disciples of Aaron, loving peace and pursuing peace; love your fellow creatures and draw them nigh unto the Law!" This is further illustrated by the tradition that Aaron was an ideal priest of the people, far more beloved for his kindly ways than was Moses. While Moses was stern and uncompromising, brooking no wrong, Aaron went about as peacemaker, reconciling husband and wife when he saw them estranged, or a man with his neighbor when they quarreled, and winning evil-doers back into the right way by his friendly intercourse. As a result, Aaron's death was more intensely mourned than Moses': when Aaron died the whole house of Israel wept, including the women, while Moses was bewailed by "the sons of Israel" only. Even in the making of the golden calf the rabbis find extenuating circumstances for Aaron. His fortitude and silent submission to the will of God on the loss of his two sons are referred to as an excellent example to men how to glorify God in the midst of great affliction. Especially significant are the words represented as being spoken by God after the princes of the Twelve Tribes had brought their dedication offerings into the newly constructed Tent of Meeting: "Say to thy brother Aaron: Greater than the gifts of the princes is thy gift; for thou art called upon to kindle the light, and, while the sacrifices shall last only as long as the Temple lasts, thy light shall last forever."

=== Christianity ===
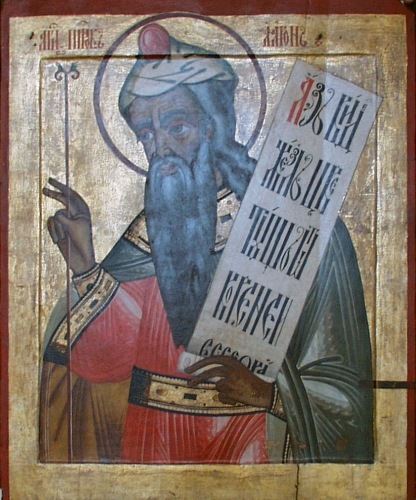
Russian icon of Aaron (18th century, Iconostasis of Kizhi monastery, Karelia, Russia).

In the Eastern Orthodox and Maronite churches, Aaron is venerated as a saint whose feast day is shared with his brother Moses and celebrated on September 4. (Those churches that follow the traditional Julian calendar celebrate this day on September 17 of the modern Gregorian calendar). Aaron is also commemorated with other Old Testament saints on the Sunday of the Holy Fathers, the Sunday before Christmas.

In Eastern Orthodox Church he is commemorated on July 20, March 12, Sunday of the Forefathers, Sunday of the Fathers and on April 14 with all saint Sinai monks.

Aaron is commemorated as one of the Holy Forefathers in the Calendar of Saints of the Armenian Apostolic Church on July 30. He is commemorated on July 1 with an optional memorial in the General Roman Calendar, and in the Syriac Calendar.

The Moses and Aaron Church (Dutch: Mozes en Aäronkerk), in the Waterlooplein neighborhood of Amsterdam, is one of the most well-known Catholic churches in the city.

One version of the Bible has an encyclopedia that describes Aaron's role in Scripture as the "spokesman for Moses".

==== Mormonism ====
In the Church of Jesus Christ of Latter-day Saints, the Aaronic priesthood is the lesser order of priesthood under the higher order of the Melchizedek priesthood. Those ordained to this priesthood have the authority to act in God's name in certain responsibilities in the church such as the administration of the sacrament and baptism.

In the Community of Christ, the Aaronic order of priesthood is regarded as an appendage to the Melchisedec order, and consists of the priesthood offices of deacon, teacher, and priest. While differing in responsibilities, these offices, along with those of the Melchisidec order, are regarded as equal before God.

=== Islam ===
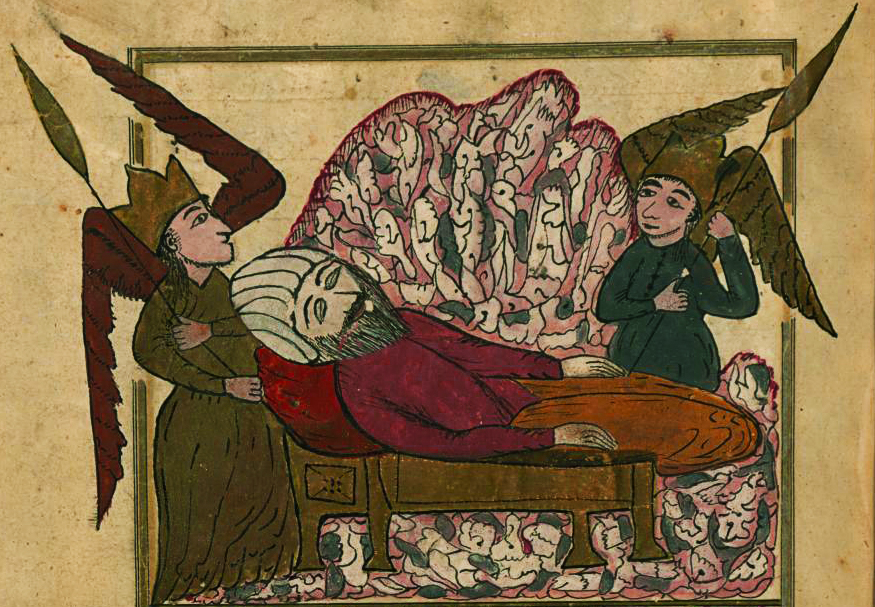
Islamic illustration of Harun sleeping next to two angels from an Ottoman manuscript.

Aaron (Arabic: هارون, Hārūn) is mentioned in the Quran as a prophet of God. The Quran praises Aaron repeatedly, calling him a "believing servant" as well as one who was "guided" and one of the "victors". The Quran additionally denies the role of Aaron in the creation of the golden calf, attributing the action to Samiri. Aaron is important in Islam for his role in the events of the Exodus, in which, according to the Quran and Islamic belief, he preached with his younger brother, Musa (Moses) to the Pharaoh of the Exodus.

Aaron's significance in Islam, however, is not limited to his role as the helper of Moses. Islamic tradition also accords Aaron the role of a patriarch, as tradition records that the priestly descent came through Aaron's lineage, which included the entire House of Amran. (Note: All commentators, classical and modern, hold that the Quranic House of Amran refers to Imrān's lineage, through his son Aaron. (cf. Muhammad Asad, Yusuf 'Ali and Ibn Kathir's commentary on Q. 19:28)) (Note: "In the second group, we have the great founders of families, apart from Abraham, viz., Noah of the time of the Flood; David and Solomon, the real establishers of the Jewish monarchy; Job, who lived 140 years, saw four generations of descendants, and was blessed at the end of his life with large pastoral wealth (Job 42:16,12); Joseph, who as Minister of State did great things in Egypt and was the progenitor of two Tribes; and Moses and Aaron, the leaders of the Exodus from Egypt. They led active lives and called 'doers of good.'")

=== Baháʼí Faith ===
In the Baháʼí Faith, although his father is described as both an apostle and a prophet, Aaron is merely described as a prophet. The Kitáb-i-Íqán describes Imran as his father.

== In art ==
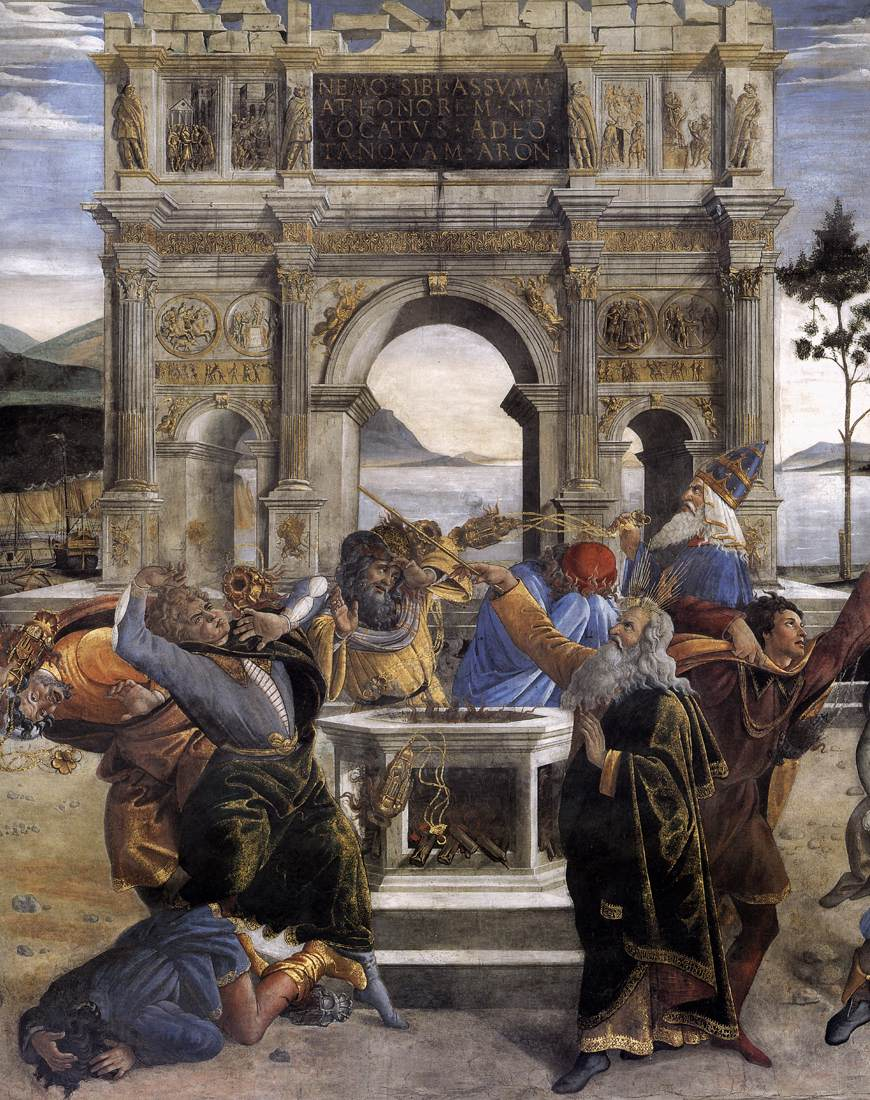
Aaron, in blue wearing a papal tiara, as depicted in Sandro Botticelli's Punishment of the Sons of Korah, 15th century

Aaron appears paired with Moses frequently in Jewish and Christian art, especially in the illustrations of manuscript and printed Bibles. He can usually be distinguished by his priestly vestments, especially his turban or miter and jeweled breastplate. He frequently holds a censer or, sometimes, his flowering rod. Aaron also appears in scenes depicting the wilderness Tabernacle and its altar, as already in the third-century frescos in the synagogue at Dura-Europos in Syria. An eleventh-century portable silver altar from Fulda, Germany depicts Aaron with his censor, and is located in the Musée de Cluny in Paris. This is also how he appears in the frontispieces of early printed Passover Haggadot and occasionally in church sculptures. Aaron has rarely been the subject of portraits, such as those by Anton Kern [1710–1747] and by Pier Francesco Mola [c. 1650]. Christian artists sometimes portray Aaron as a prophet holding a scroll, as in a twelfth-century sculpture from the Cathedral of Noyon in the Metropolitan Museum of Art, New York and often in Eastern Orthodox icons. Illustrations of the Golden Calf story usually include him as well – most notably in Nicolas Poussin's The Adoration of the Golden Calf (c. 1633–34, National Gallery, London). Finally, some artists interested in validating later priesthoods have painted the ordination of Aaron and his sons (Leviticus 8). Harry Anderson's realistic portrayal is often reproduced in the literature of the Latter Day Saints. (Note: Harry Anderson's Aaron Is Called to the Ministry is in the Conference Center of the LDS Church in Salt Lake City, Utah.)

Aaron has been depicted in Exodus-related drama, such as The Ten Commandments (1956) and Exodus: Gods and Kings (2014).

== See also ==
- Harun
- Moses in rabbinic literature
- Y-chromosomal Aaron

== Footnotes ==
Israelite religious titles
New title	High Priest of Israel; Years unknown	Succeeded by Eleazar
