= Izhar =

Figure in the Torah

According to the Torah, Izhar (Hebrew: יִצְהָר, Modern: Yīṣhar, Tiberian: Yīṣhār, "(one who) sparkles"/oil) was the father of Korah, Nepheg, and Zichri, and was a son of Kohath and grandson of Levi, consequently being the brother of Amram and uncle of Aaron, Miriam, and Moses. No further details of his life are given by the Bible, and according to some biblical scholars the genealogy for Levi's descendants is actually an aetiological myth, reflecting popular perception of the connections between different Levite factions.

Despite twice listing Izhar as being among the sons of Kohath, the Book of Chronicles subsequently goes on to state, only a few verses later, that it was the (previously unmentioned) son of Kohath named Amminadab that became the father of Korah. However, these were prominent clan names and not always direct sons as expected in Western genealogies. Later in the Book of Chronicles, Amminadab is given as the name of the leader of the Uzzielites, a clan which the biblical genealogy proclaims as being descended from Uzziel, Izhar's brother.
