= Hebron (biblical figure) =

Patriarch: son of Kohath and grandson of Levi

According to the Torah, Hebron (Hebrew: חֶבְרוֹן Ḥeḇrōn) was a son of Kohath and grandson of Levi, consequently being the brother of Amram and uncle of Aaron, Miriam, and Moses. Hebron is portrayed in the text as the founder of the Hebronite clan of Levites; however, on some occasions, the Book of Chronicles treats the Hebronites as being distinct from the descendants of Kohath.

== Analysis ==
No further details of Hebron's life are given by the Bible, and according to some biblical scholars the genealogy for Levi's descendants is actually an aetiological myth, reflecting popular perception of the connections between different Levite clans; textual scholars attribute the genealogy to the Book of Generations, a document originating from a similar religiopolitical group and date to the priestly source. Some Biblical scholars believe that the Hebronites gained their name as a result of originating at the Levite-dominated city named Hebron, meaning league. More likely and in accordance with Biblical chronology the name given to Hebron originates with the city of the same name established at the time of Abraham some 400 years prior.

== See also ==
- Hebron
