= Uzziel =

Biblical figure

According to the Torah, Uzziel (Hebrew: עֻזִּיאֵל, ʿUzzīʾēl; meaning El is my strength or God is my strength) was the father of Mishael, Elzaphan, and Zithri, and was a son of Kohath and grandson of Levi, consequently being the brother of Amram and uncle of Aaron, Miriam, and Moses. Uzziel is portrayed in the text as the founder of the Uzzielite faction of Levites; however, despite Uzziel supposedly being Kohath's son, and Elzaphan's father, on some occasions the Book of Chronicles treats the Uzzielites as being quite distinct from the descendants of Kohath, and from those of Elzaphan.

No further details of Uzziel's life are given by the Bible, and according to bible critics, the genealogy for Levi's descendants is actually an aetiological myth, reflecting popular perception of the connections between different Levite factions; textual scholars attribute the genealogy to the Book of Generations, a document originating from a similar religiopolitical group and date to the priestly source.
