= Merari =

Biblical figure, son of Levi

According to the Torah, Merari (Hebrew: מְרָרִי, Mərārī) was one of the sons of Levi, and the patriarchal founder of the Merarites, one of the four main divisions among the Levites in Biblical times. The Hebrew word Merari means "sad", "bitter" or "strong" (in the sense that a dish with a bitter taste might be said to have a "strong" taste). The Merarites were charged with the transportation and care of the structural components of the tabernacle.

Richard Elliott Friedman attributes the genealogy to the Book of Generations, a document originating from a similar religiopolitical group and date to the priestly source. According to some biblical scholars, the Torah's genealogy for Levi's descendants is actually an aetiological myth reflecting the fact that there were four different groups among the levites – the Gershonites, Kohathites, Merarites, and Aaronids; according to the Jewish Encyclopedia, Levite was originally just a job title, deriving from the Minaean word lawi'u meaning priest, rather than having been the name of a tribe.

== See also ==
- Kohath
- Gershon
- Merarites
