= Book of generations =

Hypothesized Hebrew text

The Book of generations is a hypothesized Hebrew text which lies behind two passages in the Book of Genesis. The text is no longer extant, but according to the hypothesis, portions of it survive as part of Genesis. Frank Moore Cross demonstrated that the text could be separated from the other sources, which are substantially larger in comparison.

== Description ==
The only surviving portions of the Book of Generations consist of the Generations of Adam (Genesis 5:1-32) and the descendants from Shem (11:10-26), comprising an unbroken lineage from Adam to Abraham. It may, however, have once have extended as far as Jacob.

Most scholars believe that the Book of Generations came from the Priestly source ("P"), although some have speculated that the Book of Generations itself had been borrowed in some form from an older, already extant source.

== See also ==
- Sumerian King List

== Sources ==
- Cross, Frank Moore (1973). Canaanite Myth and Hebrew Epic. Cambridge, Massachusetts.
