= Miriam =

Sister of Moses and Aaron

Prophetess Miriam
- מִרְיָם
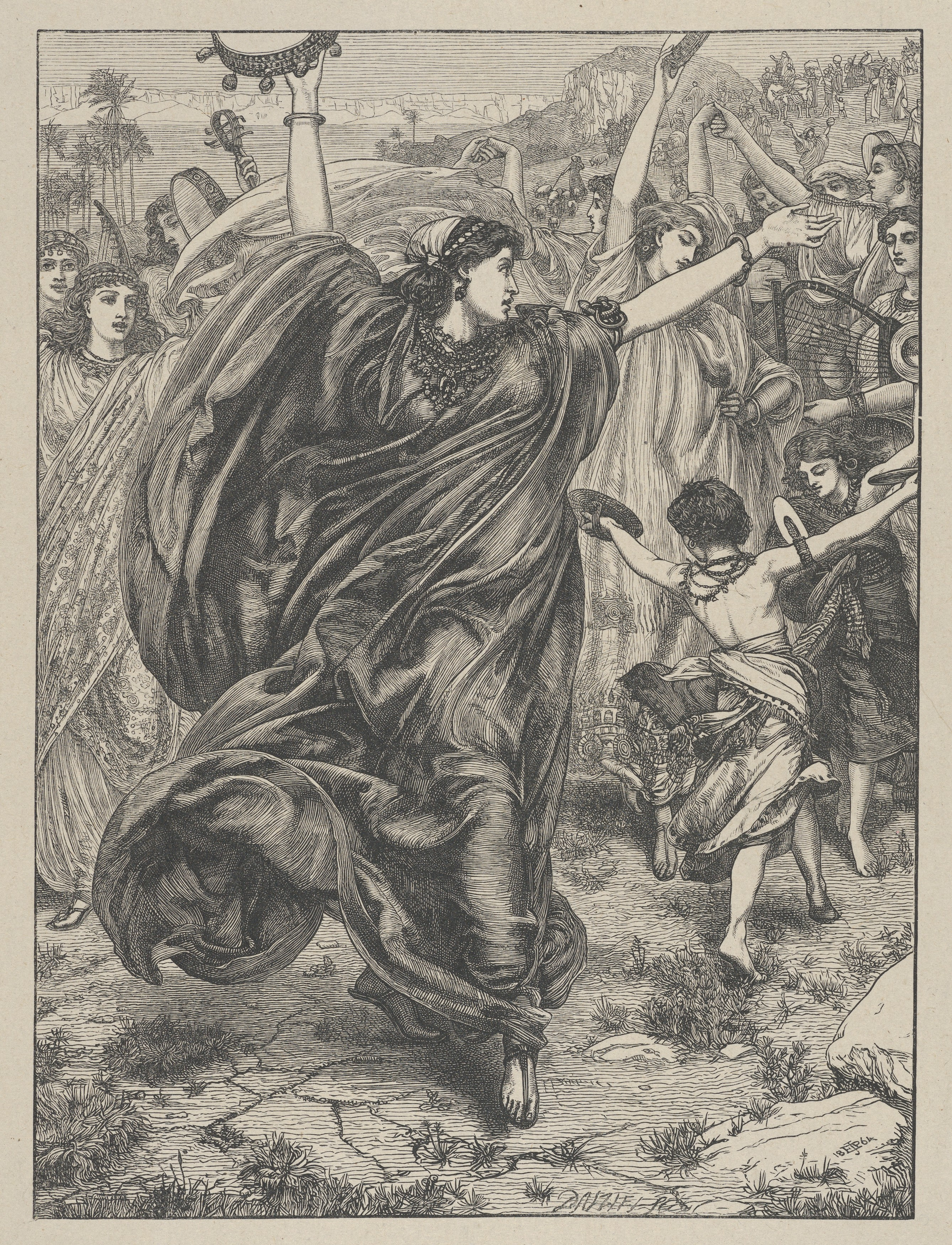
- Miriam and the Israelites celebrating their victory over Pharaoh and his army, by the Dalziels (Dalziels’ Bible Gallery) (1881), after a painting by Sir Edward John Poynter (1864).
- Venerated in: Judaism; Christianity; Islam; Samaritanism; Rastafari
- Title: Prophetess; Righteous

Personal life
- Born: Goshen, Lower Egypt, Ancient Egypt
- Died: Kadesh, in the Wilderness of Zin, near Edom (aged 126 in Jewish traditions)
- Parents: Amram (father); Jochebed (mother)
- Relatives: Levi (patrilineal great-grandfather); Aaron (brother); Moses (brother)

Miriam (Hebrew: מִרְיָם, romanized: Mīryām, lit. ‘rebellion’) is described in the Hebrew Bible as the daughter of Amram and Jochebed, and the older sister of Moses and Aaron. She was a prophetess and first appears in the Book of Exodus.

The Torah refers to her as "Miriam the Prophetess" and the Talmud names her as one of the seven major female prophets of Israel. Scripture describes her alongside of Moses and Aaron as delivering the Jews from exile in Egypt: "For I brought you up out of the land of Egypt and redeemed you from the house of slavery, and I sent before you Moses, Aaron, and Miriam". According to the Midrash, just as Moses led the men out of Egypt and taught them Torah, so too Miriam led the women and taught them Torah.

== Biblical narrative ==
Miriam was the daughter of Amram and Jochebed and the sister of Aaron and Moses, the leader of the Israelites in ancient Egypt. The narrative of Moses's infancy in the Torah describes an unnamed sister of Moses observing him being placed in the Nile; she is traditionally identified as Miriam.

In the biblical narrative of The Exodus, Miriam is described as a "prophetess" when she leads the Israelites in the Song of the Sea after the Pharaoh's army is destroyed at the Yam Suph.

When the Israelites are camped at Hazeroth after leaving Mount Sinai, Miriam and Aaron speak against Moses because he had married an unnamed "Ethiopian" or "Cushite" woman (translations differ). God comes down in a pillar of cloud and rebukes them, emphasizing the supreme prophetic authority of Moses. After God departs, Miriam appears white with a skin disease (tzaraath, traditionally translated as "leprosy"). Aaron asks for forgiveness and for Miriam to be cured. Moses relays the prayer to God, who says that Miriam should be excluded from the Israelite camp for seven days, which is done.

Regarding the death of Miriam, the Torah states, "The entire congregation of the children of Israel arrived at the desert of Tzin in the first month, and the people settled in Kadesh. Miriam died and was buried there."

== Interpretations and elaboration ==
=== Cushite wife ===
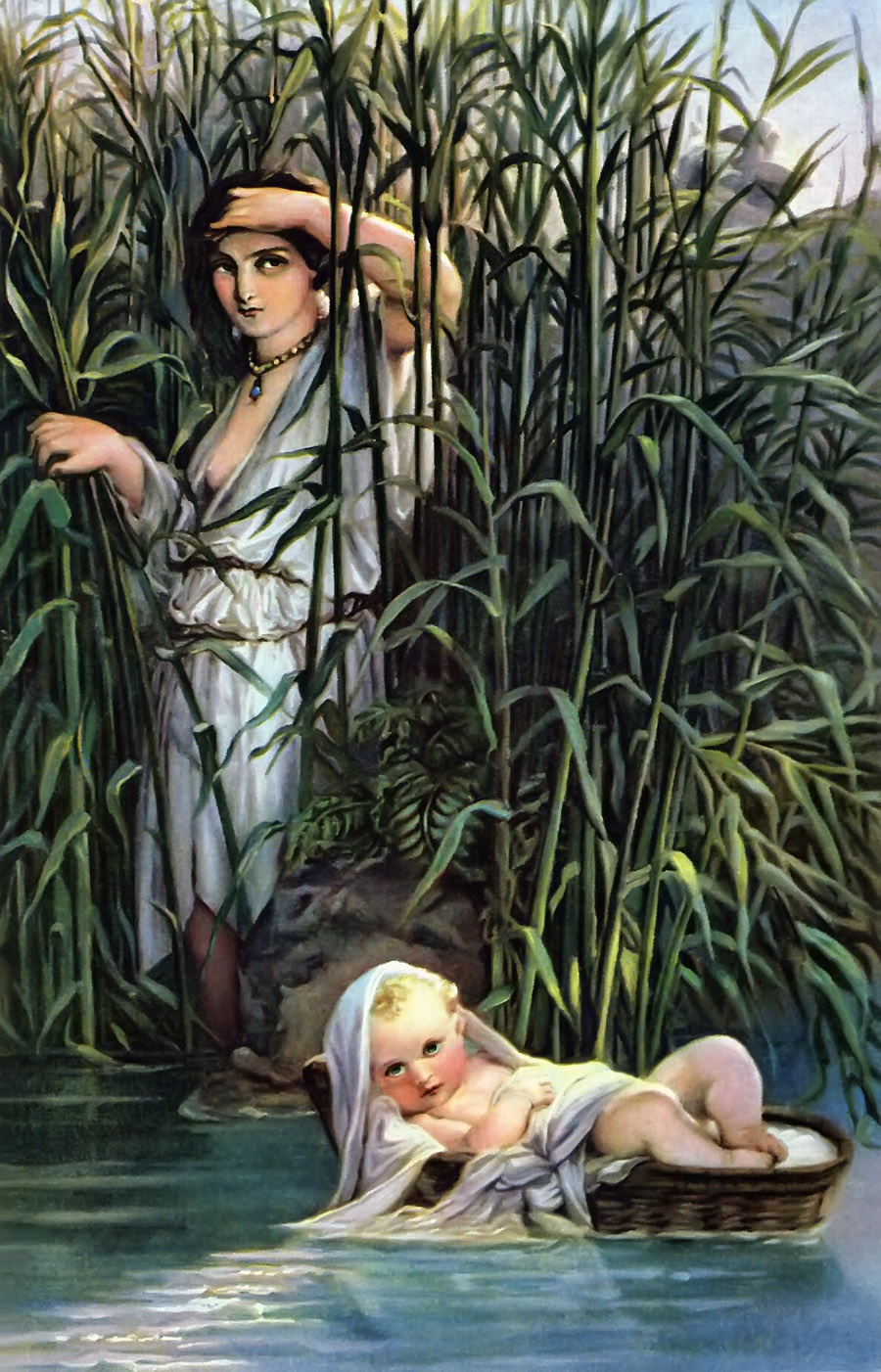
Miriam watching over her infant brother Moses in a 19th century painting by Paul Delaroche

The Midrash explains the entire story as follows: It became known to Miriam and Aaron that Moses had separated from intimacy with his wife Tzipora. They disapproved of this separation because they considered her to be outstandingly righteous, much as a dark-skinned person stands out among light-skinned people—hence the reference to Tzipora as a "Cushite". This usage of the word Cushite is non-pejorative and is often used in Jewish sources as a term for someone unique and outstanding.

In fact, King Saul and even the Jewish people are referred to by the term "Cushite". Their complaint, therefore, was not about the union between Moses and Tzipora, but about their separation. The only justification they could find for Moses's celibacy was in order to maintain his prophetic state. This explains their claim that God spoke not only to Moses but also to them, yet they had not separated from their spouses.

But God rebuked them by calling them all out "suddenly", causing Miriam and Aaron a great burning sensation since they lacked immersion in a mikva after marital relations. God thus demonstrated to them Moses's unique level of prophecy for which he had to be prepared at all times, thereby justifying his separation from Tzipora. Afterwards, "God's wrath flared against them." Rabbi Louis Ginzberg wrote the anger of God to them.

... I Myself ordered him to abstain from conjugal life, and the word he received was revealed to him clearly and not in dark speeches, he saw the Divine presence from behind when It passed by him. Wherefore then were ye not afraid to speak against a man like Moses, who is, moreover, My servant? Your censure is directed to Me, rather than to him, for "the receiver is no better than the thief," and if Moses is not worthy of his calling, I, his Master, deserve censure.

— Legends of the Jews vol. III

Afterward, Miriam is left with bodily tzara'at, which according to Jewish sources is a divine punishment for slander. This was because she, not Aaron, was the one who initiated the complaint against Moses. Despite Miriam's intent to help Tzipora, she should have judged Moses favorably and approached Moses on Tzipora's behalf privately. Aaron asks Moses to intercede for Miriam, Moses prays to God to heal her, and God concedes after requiring a quarantine of seven days.

Both Miriam and Aaron spoke against Moses, but only Miriam contracted tzara'at. It has been suggested that since according to the Hebrew Bible anyone with tzara'at was tamei (Leviticus 13–14), Aaron was spared this punishment in order not to interrupt his duties as High Priest. However, noting the wording of the verse, "God's wrath flared against them [i.e., both Aaron and Miriam]", the Talmud appears to conclude that Aaron was also smitten with tzara'at initially, but was then immediately cured.

==== Alternative explanations ====
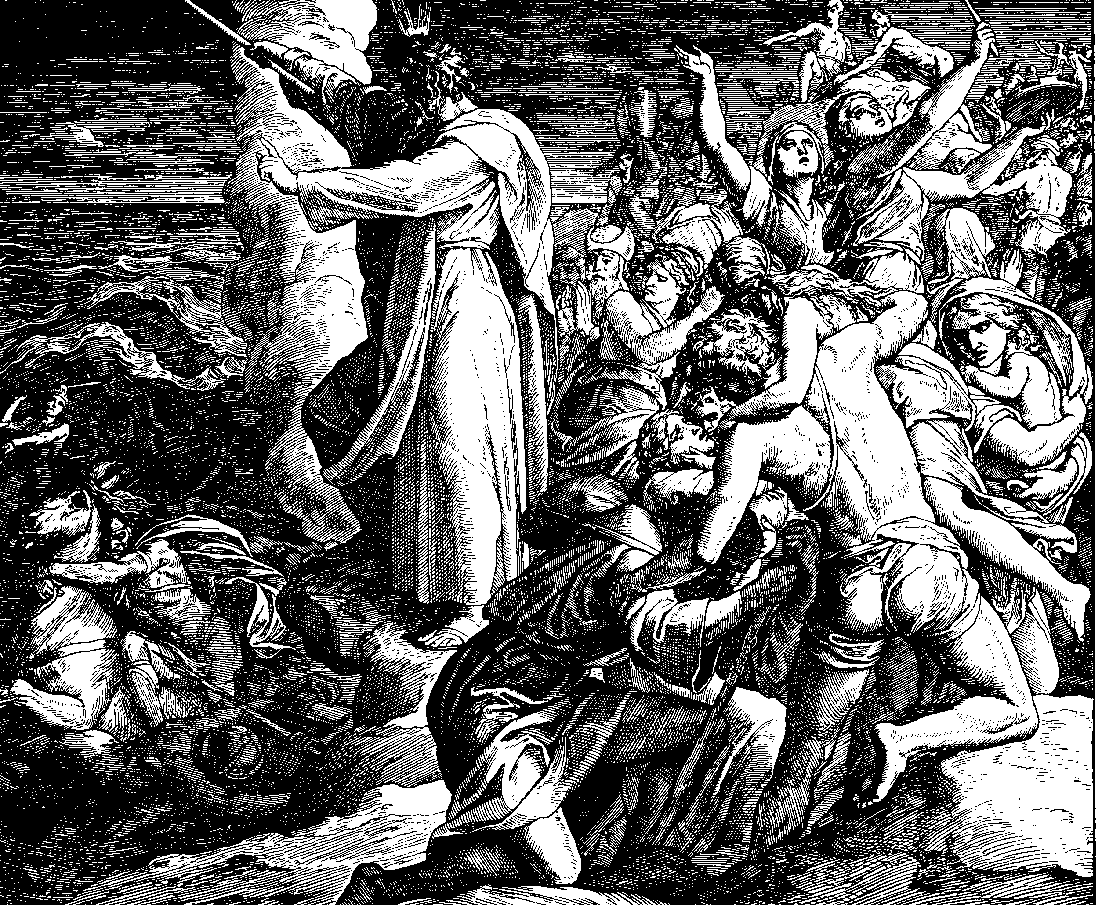
Miriam's Song, by Julius Schnorr von Carolsfeld, 1860.

It has been suggested that Josephus and Irenaeus (who merely cites Josephus) identify the Cushite woman as Tharbis, "the daughter of the king of the Ethiopians". However, while Josephus does describe a legend (which is not written in the Torah) wherein Moses marries this princess during a military campaign he leads in Ethiopia, according to Josephus this marriage occurs while Moses is still a royal prince of Egypt long before he re-discovers his oppressed Jewish brethren. After which time, upon fleeing as a solitary fugitive from Egypt, Moses marries Tzipora the daughter of Yitro the Midianite, as recorded in the Torah.

Thus Josephus himself records Moses's marriage to Tzipora as separate and subsequent to his earlier marriage to Tharbis. According to the conclusion of the Tharbis legend, Moses fashioned a miraculous ring which caused her to forget her love for him, and he then returned to Egypt alone. Therefore, even according to Josephus, Moses's first marriage to Tharbis as military leader of Egypt terminated long before his later marriage to Tzipora as fugitive from Egypt, such that the Cushite wife of Moses mentioned in the Torah after the Exodus appears to be Tzipora, as explained above.

Richard E. Friedman writes that since Cush is generally understood to mean "Ethiopia", it is possible that the "Cushite woman" is not Tzipora. But he adds that since there is a place called Cushan which is a region of Midian, and Moses's wife Tzipora has already been identified as a Midianite, it is possible that the term "Cushite" relates to Tzipora's being from Cushan. Friedman's primary interest is not in the identity of the Cushite woman, but rather in the outcome of this story which establishes Moses's superiority over Aaron as an example of his claim that rival priesthoods created or publicized tales in order to legitimize their respective claims to privilege and power.

He describes the Aaronid priesthood in the Kingdom of Judah, which claimed descent from Aaron and which controlled the Temple in Jerusalem, as opposed to a priesthood which claimed allegiance to Moses and was based at Shiloh in the Kingdom of Israel. Using interpretations from the documentary hypothesis, he notes that this story, which he calls "Snow-White Miriam", was authored by the Elohist who he claims was from, or supported, the Shiloh priesthood, and thus promoted this tale to assert Moses's superiority over Aaron and thereby belittle the Aaronid priesthood in Judah. However, the identity of the Cushite woman referred to in this story is tangential to Friedman and his opinion remains inconclusive.

=== The Well of Miriam ===
Miriam's death is described in Numbers 20:1, and in the next verse the Israelites are described as complaining of the lack of water at Kadesh. The text reads, "Miriam died there, and was buried there. And there was no water for the congregation."

In Jewish folk-religious tradition this abrupt transition between her death and the lack of water was explained by postulating a "well of Miriam" that dried up when she died. Further elaboration identified the rock that Moses struck to bring forth water in Exodus 17:5–6 with this well, and it was said that the rock travelled with the people until Miriam's death.

The Talmud says, "Three great leaders led Israel: Moses, Aaron and Miriam. In their merit they received three great gifts: the Well [Miriam], the Clouds of Glory [Aaron] and the Manna [Moses]." When Miriam died, the well was removed as is evidenced by the fact that immediately after the verse "And Miriam died", there was no water for the community.

Rashi says that this well was the same rock from which Moses brought forth water after Miriam's death. The Midrash states that when they encamped, the leader of each Tribe took his staff to the well and drew a line in the sand toward his Tribe's encampment. The waters of the well were drawn after the mark and thus supplied water for each of the Tribes.

== Symbolism in modern practice ==
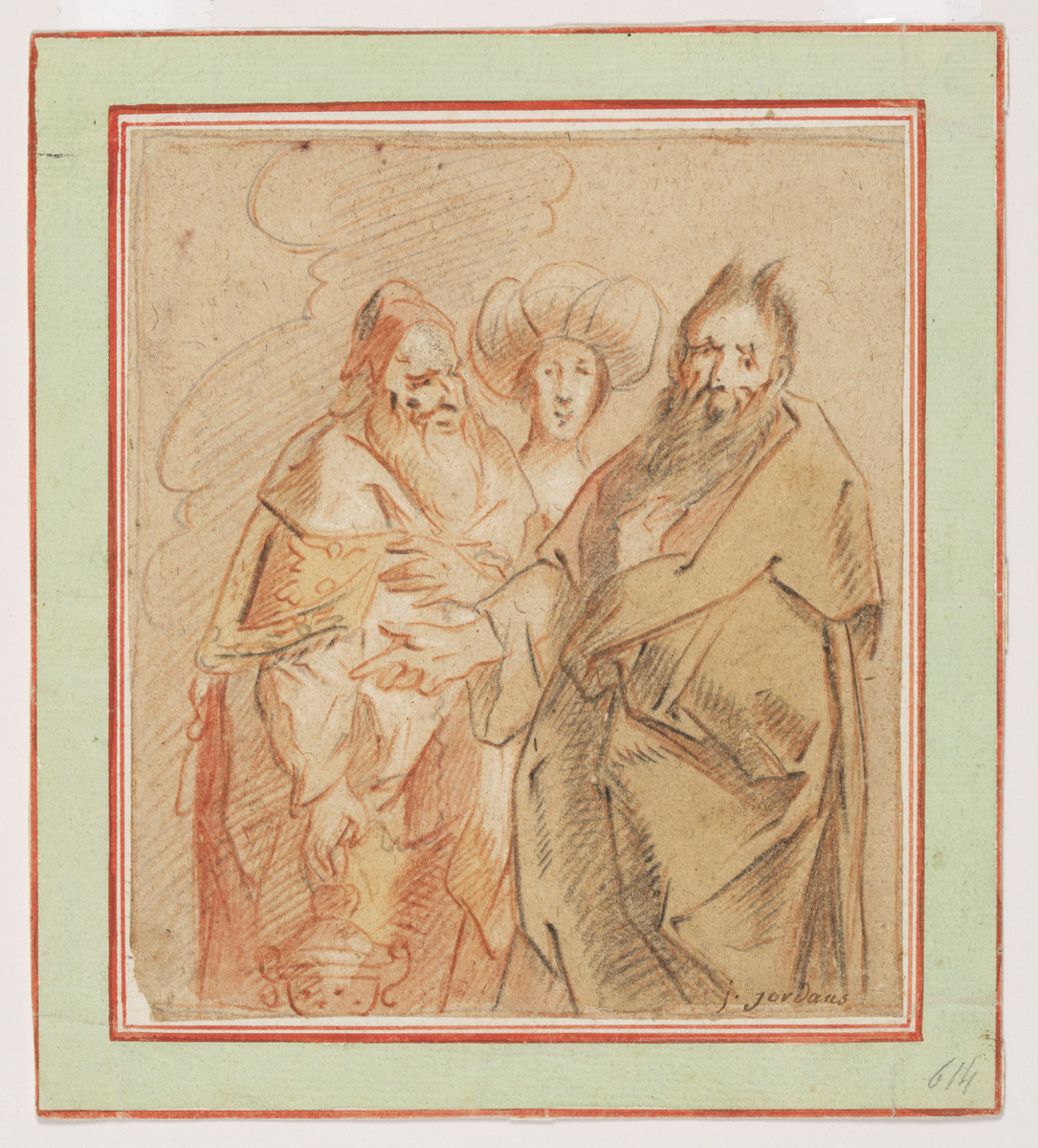
Aaron, Miriam and Moses. Chalk drawing by Jacob Jordaens, c 1650

Miriam is a popular figure among some Jewish feminists. In addition to the traditional cup of wine that is set for the Prophet Elijah, some feminist-inspired Seders set a cup of water for Miriam which is sometimes also accompanied by a ritual in her honor. Miriam's Cup originated in the 1980s in a Boston Rosh Chodesh group; it was invented by Stephanie Loo, who filled it with what she referred to as mayim chayim (living waters) and used it in a feminist ceremony of guided meditation. Miriam's cup is linked to the midrash of Miriam's Well, described as "a rabbinic legend that tells of a miraculous well that accompanied the Israelites during their forty years in the desert at the Exodus from Egypt".

Some Modern Orthodox Jews have revived an ancient custom of adding a piece of fish to the Seder plate in honor of Miriam who is associated with water, based on the teaching in the Talmud that God gave manna (on the ground) in the merit of Moses, clouds of glory (in the sky) in the merit of Aaron and a well (of water) in the merit of Miriam. The lamb (earth), egg (air) and fish (water) in the Seder symbolize the three prophets Moses, Aaron and Miriam, respectively, whom God chose to redeem the Jews from Egypt.

Similarly, the lamb, egg and fish also allude to the three mythical creatures in Jewish tradition—the land beast Behemoth, the bird Ziz, and the sea-creature Leviathan, respectively. According to the Midrash, the Leviathan and Behemoth, as well as the Ziz, are to be served at the Seudat Techiyat HaMetim (the feast for the righteous following the Resurrection of the Dead), to which the Passover Seder alludes, insofar as it commemorates the past Redemption together with the Cup of Elijah's heralding the future, Final Redemption.

== Islamic account ==
In the Quran, as in the Hebrew Bible, Miriam obeys her mother's request to follow the baby Moses as he floats down the river in a basket, their mother having set him afloat so he would not be killed by Pharaoh's servants and soldiers (28:11). Later on, Asiya, wife of Pharaoh, finds Moses at the river and adopts him as her own, but Moses refuses to be suckled by her. Miriam approaches Pharaoh's wife and her handmaidens, telling them that she knows a family who can care for Moses and a woman whom he will accept to be breastfed by. The woman is actually Moses' own mother, but Miriam does not reveal her identity to Pharaoh's household. (28:12-13).

According to a few weak at best hadiths, Muhammad will marry Miriam in Paradise. (Note: The narration states that the Prophet Muhammad mentioned: "Allaah married me to Maryam, mother of Jesus, and Kulthum [Miriam], sister of Moses, and Asiyah, the wife of Pharaoh, in Jannah. Al-Hakim al-Nishapuri classified the hadith to be authentic, while Ibn Kathir as weak.)

== Veneration ==
In the Eastern Orthodox Church, Miriam is commemorated twice in the period before Christmas, on the Sunday of the Forefathers and the Sunday of the Fathers, and on the Wednesday after Easter along with all of the other saints who labored on Mt. Sinai.

== See also ==
- Miriai; Mandaean heroine that some equate with Miriam
