= Cities in the Book of Joshua =

The Book of Joshua lists almost 400 ancient Levantine city names (including alternative names and derivatives in the form of words describing citizens of a town) which refer to over 300 distinct locations in Israel, the West Bank, Jordan, Lebanon and Syria. Each of those cities, with minor exceptions (e.g. Hamath, Gubla) is placed in one of the 12 regions, according to the tribes of Israel and in most cases additional details like neighbouring towns or geographical landmarks are provided. It has been serving as one of the primary sources for identifying and locating a number of Middle Bronze to Iron Age Levantine cities mentioned in ancient Egyptian and Canaanite documents, most notably in the Amarna correspondence.

== The list of cities and suggested locations ==
City name				References in the Hebrew Bible		Location		Notes
Hebrew	Transliteration	English	Strong's Nr	Joshua	All	Tribe / Region	Modern	Notes
אבץ	ʾbṣ	Abez, Ebez	H0077	Joshua 19:20	1	Issachar		
אדם	ʾdm	Adam	H0121	Joshua 3:16	1	? (Located by the Jordan, near Zaretan, far from Jericho)	Tall Damiyah 32°6′13.8″N 35°32′48.8″E; Bedhat esh-Sha'ab	
אדמה	ʾdmh	Adamah	H0128	Joshua 19:36	1	Naphtali (a fortified city)		
אדמי	ʾdmy	Adami	H0129	Joshua 19:33	1	Naphtali		
אדמים	ʾdmym	Adummim	H0131	Joshua 15:7; 18:17	2	? Judah? (a point of reference in describing the northern border of Judah and the southern border of Benjamin while mentioning Gilgal/Geliloth)		
אדרה	ʾdrh	Adar, Addar	H0146	Joshua 15:3	1	Judah (southern border; to the east of Hezron and Kadesh-Barnea)		
אדרעי	ʾdrʿy	Edrei [of Naphtali]	H0154	Joshua 19:37	1	Naphtali (a fortified city)		
אדרעי	ʾdrʿy	Edrei [of Manasseh]	H0154	Joshua 12:4; 13:12.31	7	Manasseh (east of Jordan, in Bashan)	? Der'a 36°05′40″N 32°36′26″E; Izra?	
אזנות תבור	ʾznwt tbwr	Aznoth-Tabor	H0243	Joshua 19:34	1	Naphtali (to the west of the Jordan river)		
אילון	ʾylwn	Elon, Ajalon [of Dan 2]	H0356	Joshua [10:12?;] 19:43	1	Dan	Tell el-Buṭme	
אילון	ʾylwn	Ajalon [of Dan 1]	H0357	Joshua 10:12; 19:42; 21:24	10	Dan (a levitical city)	? Yalo, Khirbet Yalu 31°50′31″N 35°01′31″E; Tell Qiqa/Qoqa 31°50′23″N 35°01′25″E	
אכזיב	ʾkzyb	Achzib [of Judah]	H0392	Joshua 15:44	2	Judah (important cities: Libnah, Keilah, Achzib, Maresha)	? Khirbet 'En el-Kizbe	
אכזיבה	ʾkzybh	Achzib [of Asher], Achzibah	H0392	Joshua 19:29	2	Asher (eastern border between Tyre and Achzib)	ez-Zib 33°02′52″N 35°06′08″E	
אכשף	ʾkšp	Achshaph	H0407	Joshua 11:1; 12:20; 19:25	3	Asher (not very far from Hazor, Madon and Shimrom)	? Tell Keisan 32°52′23.16″N 35°9′2.88″E; Khirbet el-Harbaj	
אלון	ʾlwn	Allon	H0438	Joshua 19:33	1	Naphtali		
אלמלך	ʾlmlk	Alammelech	H0487	Joshua 19:26	1	Asher		
אלף, האלף	(h)ʾlp	Eleph, Ha-Eleph	H0507	Joshua 18:28	1	Benjamin (group B; important cities: Gibeon, Ramah, Mizpeh, Jerusalem)		
אלתולד	ʾltwld	Eltolad	H0513	Joshua 15:30; 19:4	2	Simeon within Judah (southwestern territory bordering Edom; group A, important cities: Beersheba, Hormah, Ziklag)		
אלתקה	ʾltqh	Eltekeh	H0514	Joshua 19:44; 21:23	2	Dan (a levitical city)	? Khirbet el-Mukenna'; Tell esh-Shalaf	= Eltekon (H0515, Judah's) ?
אלתקן	ʾltqn	Eltekon	H0515	Joshua 15:59	1	Judah (no important cities)		= Eltekeh (H0514, Dan's) ?
אמם	ʾmm	Amam	H0538	Joshua 15:26	1	Judah (southwestern territory bordering Edom; group A, important cities: Beersheba, Hormah, Ziklag)		
אנחרת	ʾnḥrt	Anaharath	H0588	Joshua 19:19	1	Issachar		
אפק	ʾpq	Aphek, Aphik	H0663	Joshua 12:18; 13:4; 19:30	9?	Asher (south-western coastal territory of Asher)	? Tell Kurdana/ Qurdana 32°50′41″N 35°06′31″E	
אפקה	ʾpqh	Aphekah	H0664	Joshua 15:53	1	Judah (important cities: Hebron)		
ארב	ʾrb	Arab	H0694	Joshua 15:52	1	Judah (important cities: Hebron)		
ארכי, הארכי	(h)ʾrky	Archi, Ha-Archi	H0757	Joshua 16:2	7	Ephraim (southern border, Ataroth region between Bethel and the lower Beth-Horon)	? Ein 'Arik 31°54′24″N 35°08′35″E	An inhabitant of a city of a similar name or members of a clan
אשדוד	ʾšdwd	Ashdod	H0795	Joshua 11:22; 15:46.47	17 [22]	Judah (by the sea; important cities: Ekron, Ashdod, Gaza)	Tell Ashdod (near Ashdod) 31°45′21″N 34°39′29″E	
אשדודי	ʾšdwdy	Ashdothite, Ashdodite	H0796	Joshua 13:3	5	Judah	see Ashdod (H0795)	An inhabitant of Ashdod (H0795)
אשנה	ʾšnh	Ashnah [of Judah 1]	H0823	Joshua 15:33	1	Judah ("in the valley"; important cities: Eshtaol, Zoreah, Engannim, Tappuah, Jarmuth, Adullam, Socoh 1, Azekah)		
אשנה	ʾšnh	Ashnah [of Judah 2]	H0823	Joshua 15:43	1	Judah (important cities: Libnah, Keilah, Achzib, Maresha)		
אשען	ʾšʿn	Eshean	H0824	Joshua 15:52	1	Judah (important cities: Hebron)		
אשקלונ	ʾšqlwn	Ashkelon	H0831	-	12 [13]	Judah ? (one of the main Philistine cities)	Tel Ashkelon 31°39′45″N 34°32′52″E	Mentioned indirectly as Eshkalonite (H0832)
אשקלוני	ʾšqlwny	Eshkalonite	H0832	Joshua 13:3	1	Judah ? (one of the main Philistine cities)	see Ashqelon (H0831)	An inhabitant of Ashqelon (H0831)
אשר	ʾšr	Asher	H0836	Joshua 17:7	2?	Manasseh (not far? from Shechem)	? Tayasir 32°20′26″N 35°23′49″E; Khirbet Yarzah	possibly not a city but the name of the Asher tribe
אשתאול	ʾštʾwl	Eshtaol	H0847	Joshua 15:33; 19:41	7	Judah ("in the valley"; important cities: Eshtaol, Zoreah, Engannim, Tappuah, Jarmuth, Adullam, Socoh 1, Azekah); Dan (border city between Dan and Judah?)	? Ishwa, Eshua 31°46′50″N 35°00′42″E; Khirbet Islin/ Eselin 31°47′09″N 34°59′56″E; Khirbet Deir/Dayr abu-Kabus, Tell Abu al-Qabus 31°47′06″N 35°00′38″E; Khirbet Deir Shubeib 31°47′42″N 34°59′11″E; Khirbet esh-Sheikh Ibrahim 31°46′34″N 35°00′57″E; Artuf 31°46′04″N 35°00′08″E	
אשתמה, אשתמע	ʾštmh, ʾštmʿ	Eshtemoh, Eshtemoa	H0851	Joshua 15:50; 21:14	4	Judah ("in the mountains"; important cities: Debir, Goshen; a levitical city)	As-Samu 31°24′03″N 35°04′02″E	
בארות	bʾrwt	Beeroth	H0881	Joshua 9:17; 18:25	5	Benjamin (group B; important cities: Gibeon, Ramah, Mizpeh, Jerusalem; a city of Gibeonites alongside Gibeon, Chephirah and Kirjath-jearim)		
באר שבע	bʾr šbʿ	Beer-Sheba	H0884	Joshua 15:28; 19:2	34	Simeon within Judah (southwestern territory bordering Edom; group A, important cities: Beersheba, Hormah, Ziklag)	Tell es-Seba (near Beersheba) 31°14′41″N 34°50′27″E	
לבוא חמת	lbwʾ ḥmt	Lebo-Hamath	H0935 + H2574	Joshua 13:5	11	Naphtali?, Manasseh?	? Tell Labweh (near Labweh) 34°11′51″N 36°20′32″E	Possibly not a city but a geographical location
בזיותיה	bzywtyh	Bizjothjah	H0964	Joshua 15:28	1	Judah (southwestern territory bordering Edom; group A, important cities: Beersheba, Hormah, Ziklag)		
בטן	bṭn	Beten	H0991	Joshua 19:25	1	Asher	Tell el-Far near Abtun	
בטנים	bṭnym	Betonim	H0993	Joshua 13:26	1	Gad (east of Jordan)	Khirbet Batneh	
בית און	byt ʾwn	Beth-Aven	H1007	Joshua 7:2; 18:12	7	Benjamin ? (northern border of Benjamin's territory, between Jericho and Luz; near Ai, to the east of Bethel)	? Khirbet el-Maqatir 31°54′55″N 35°15′01″E; Beitin 31°55′36″N 35°14′23″E; et-Tell 31°55′01″N 35°15′41″E; Khirbet Nisieh 31°53′48″N 35°13′45″E; formerly identified with: Khirbet Haiyan 31°54′15″N 35°16′10″E; Deir Dibwan 31°54′38″N 35°16′17″E; Burg Beitin 31°55′21″N 35°14′43″E; Burqa 31°53′46″N 35°15′15″E; Tell Maryam 31°52′10″N 35°16′06″E; Khirbet Tell el-'Askar 31°52′49″N 35°16′52″E	
ביתאל	bytʾl	Bethel	H1008	Joshua 7:2; 8:9.12.17; 12:9.16; 16:1-2; 18:13.22	72	Benjamin (group A; important cities: Bethel, Jericho; southern border of Ephraim's territory, not far from Jericho; west of Beth-Aven and Ai; beside Ai; northern border of Benjamin's territory between Beth-Aven and Ataroth-Adar)	? Beitin 31°55′37″N 35°14′19″E; Ras et-Tahuneh (in Al-Bireh) 31°54′30″N 35°12′44″E	= Luz (H3870)
בית בעל מעון, בית מעון	byt bʿl mʿwn, byt mʿwn	Beth-Baal-Meon, Beth-Meon	H1010	Joshua 13:17	2	Reuben (east of Jordan)	? Khirbet et-Teim (near Ma'in, Jordan)	
ביתדגון	bytdgwn	Beth-Dagon [of Judah]	H1016	Joshua 15:41	1	Judah (important cities: Lachish, Eglon, Makkedah)		
ביתדגון	bytdgwn	Beth-Dagon [of Asher]	H1016	Joshua 19:27	1	Asher (between Carmel and the valley of Jipthah-El, close to Zebulun's territory)		
בית הישמות	byt (h)yšmwt	Beth-Jeshimoth, Beth-Ha-Jeshimoth	H1020	Joshua 12:3; 13:20	4	Reuben (east of Jordan)	Tell el-‘Azeimeh (near Sweimeh, Jordan) 31.782551°N 35.621250°E	
ביתהמרכבות	byt(h)mrkbwt	Beth-Marcaboth, Beth-Ha-Marcaboth	H1024	Joshua 19:5	2	Simeon within Judah (listed between Hormah, Ziklag and Hazar-Susah, Beth-Lebaoth)		= Madmannah (H4086) ?
בית העמק	byt (h)ʿmq	Beth-Emek, Beth-Ha-Emek	H1025	Joshua 19:27	1	Asher (near the valley of Jipthah-El, close to Zebulun's territory)	Tell Mīmās	
בית הערבה	byt (h)ʿrbh	Beth-Arabah, Beth-Ha-Arabah [of Judah]	H1026	Joshua 15:61	1	Judah ("in the wilderness"; important cities: En-Gedi)		= Beth-Arabah [of Benjamin] (H1026) ?
בית הערבה	byt (h)ʿrbh	Beth-Arabah, Beth-Ha-Arabah [of Benjamin]	H1026	Joshua 15:6; 18:22	2	Benjamin (group A; important cities: Bethel, Jericho; northern border of Judah, close to Beth-Hoglah and the Jordan river)		= Beth-Arabah [of Judah] (H1026) ?
בית הרם	byt hrm	Beth-Aram, Beth-Haram	H1027	Joshua 13:27	1	Gad (east of Jordan)	Tell Iktanu; Tell er-Rameh 31°49′32″N 35°38′40″E	
ביתחגלה	bytḥglh	Beth-Hoglah	H1031	Joshua 15:6; 18:19.21	3	Benjamin (group A; important cities: Bethel, Jericho; southern border of Benjamin and northern border of Judah; closest to the Jordan river)	? Deir Hajla area: 'Ain Ḥajla 31°49′41″N 35°30′44″E (optionally Dir Hg'la 31°49′23″N 35°30′26″E or Deir Hijleh 31°49′13″N 35°30′05″E)	
בית חורן עליון	byt ḥwrn ʿlywn	Beth-Horon the upper	H1032 + H5945	Joshua (10:10-11?;) 16:5; (21:22?)	11 or 4	Ephraim (Ephraim's eastern border, not far from Ataroth-Addar; a levitical city?)	Beit 'Ur al-Fawqa 31°53′09″N 35°06′51″E	
בית חורן תחתון	byt ḥwrn tḥtwn	Beth-Horon the lower	H1032 + H8481	Joshua (10:10-11?;) 16:3; 18:13-14; (21:22?)	13 or 6	Ephraim (southern border, between Bethel, Ataroth and Gezer; northern border of Benjamin's territory between Luz-Bethel, Ataroth-Adar and Kiriath-Jearim; a levitical city?)	Beit Ur al-Tahta 31°53′42″N 35°05′01″E	
בית לבאות	byt lbʾwt	Beth-Lebaoth	H1034	Joshua 19:6	1	Simeon within Judah (listed after Hormah, Ziklag and before Ain, Rimmon)		= Lebaoth (H3822) ?
בית לחם	byt lḥm	Bethlehem [of Zebulun]	H1035	Joshua 19:15	1?	Zebulun	Bethlehem of Galilee 32°44′12″N 35°11′29″E	
בית נמרה	byt nmrh	Beth-Nimrah	H1039	Joshua 13:27	2	Gad (east of Jordan)	Tell Nimrin 31.909°N 35.638°E	
ביתענות	bytʿnwt	Beth-Anoth	H1042	Joshua 15:59	1	Judah (no important cities)		
ביתענת	bytʿnt	Beth-Anath	H1043	Joshua 19:38	3	Naphtali (a fortified city; not far from Beth-Shemesh)	? Safad El Battikh 33°12′00″N 35°25′58″E	
בית פלט	byt plṭ	Beth-Pelet	H1046	Joshua 15:27	2	Judah (southwestern territory bordering Edom; group A, important cities: Beersheba, Hormah, Ziklag)		
בית פעור	byt pʿwr	Beth-Peor	H1047	Joshua 13:20	4	Reuben (east of Jordan)	? Khirbet el-Meshed	
בית פצץ	byt pṣṣ	Beth-Pazzez	H1048	Joshua 19:21	1	Issachar		
ביתצור	bytṣwr	Beth-Zur	H1049	Joshua 15:58	2?	Judah (no important cities)	Khirbet et-Tubeiqa 31.58333°N 35.1°E	
ביתשאן	bytšʾn	Beth-Shean	H1052	Joshua 17:11.16	9	Manasseh (west of Jordan, among Issachar and Asher)	Tell Beisan, Tell el-Husn 32°30′16″N 35°30′11″E	
ביתשמש	bytšmš	Beth-Shemesh [of Judah]	H1053	Joshua 15:10; 21:16	16	Judah (northern border, between Kirjath-Jearim and Timnah; a levitical city)	Tell er-Rumeileh (near Beit Shemesh) 31°45′03″N 34°58′31″E	
ביתשמש	bytšmš	Beth-Shemesh [of Issachar]	H1053	Joshua 19:22	1	Issachar?	Tell el-Muḫarḫaš	= Beth-Szemesh [of Naphtali] (H1053) ?
ביתשמש	bytšmš	Beth-Shemesh [of Naphtali]	H1053	Joshua 19:38	3	Naphtali (a fortified city)	? Ḫirbet Tell er-Ruwēse; Ḥārīș	
ביתתפוח	byttpwḥ	Beth-Tappuah	H1054	Joshua 15:53	1	Judah (important cities: Hebron)	Taffuh 31°32′21″N 35°3′11″E	
בלה	blh	Balah	H1088	Joshua 19:3	1	Simeon within Judah		= Baalah (H1173) ?
במות בעל, במות	bmwt bʿl, bmwt	Bamoth-Baal, Bamoth	H1120	Joshua 13:17	4	Reuben (east of Jordan)	? Khirbet el-Quweiqiyeh	
בניברק	bnybrq	Bene-Berak	H1139	Joshua 19:45	1	Dan		
בעל גד	bʿl gd	Baal-Gad	H1171	Joshua 11:17; 12:7; 13:5	3	Manasseh?, Naphtali? (in the valley of Lebanon under Mount Hermon, on the west side of the Jordan river)	? Tell Haush; Hasbeija 33°23′52″N 35°40′57″E	
בעלה	bʿlh	Baalah [of Judah 1]	H1173	Joshua 15:9.10	3	Judah (northern border between Jerusalem and Beth-Shemesh)	see Kiriath-Jearim (H7157)	= Kiriath-Jearim (H7157)
בעלה	bʿlh	Baalah [of Judah 2]	H1173	Joshua 15:29	1	Judah (southwestern territory bordering Edom; group A, important cities: Beersheba, Hormah, Ziklag)		= Balah (H1088, Simeon's) ?
בעלות	bʿlwt	Bealoth	H1175	Joshua 15:24	2 or 1	Judah (southwestern territory bordering Edom; group A, important cities: Beersheba, Hormah, Ziklag)		
בעלת	bʿlt	Baalath	H1191	Joshua 19:44	3	Dan		
בעלת באר	bʿlt bʾr	Baalath-Beer	H1192	Joshua 19:8	1	Simeon (within Judah?, in the Negev?)		
בעשתרה	bʿštrh	Beesh-Terah	H1203	Joshua 21:27	1	Manasseh (east of the Jordan river; a levitical city)	see Ashtaroth (H6252)	= Ashtaroth (H6252) ?
בצקת	bṣqt	Bozkath	H1218	Joshua 15:39	2	Judah (important cities: Lachish, Eglon, Makkedah)		
בצר	bṣr	Bezer	H1221	Joshua 20:8; 21:36	4	Reuben (on the east side of the Jordan; not far from Jericho?; a city of refuge; a levitical city)	Jalul 31°43′0″N 35°51′0″E; Umm el-Amud	
בתול	btwl	Bethul	H1329	Joshua 19:4	1	Simeon within Judah (listed between Azem, Eltolad and Hormah, Ziklag)		= Chesil (H3686) ?
גבל	gbl	Gebal	H1380	-	1 [3]	Asher ?	Byblos 34°07′25″N 35°39′07″E	Mentioned indirectly as Giblite (H1382)
גבלי	gbly	Giblite, Gebalite	H1382	Joshua 13:5	2	Asher ?	see Gebal/Gubla (H1380)	An inhabitant of Gebal/Gubla (H1380)
גבע	gbʿ	Geba, Gaba	H1387	Joshua 18:24; 21:17	18	Benjamin (group A; important cities: Bethel, Jericho; a levitical city)	? Jaba' (near Jerusalem) 31°51′27″N 35°15′40″E?	
גבעה	gbʿh	Gibeah [of Judah]	H1390	Joshua 15:57	43 or 1	Judah (important cities: Gibeah, Timnah)		= Gibeah [of Benjamin] (H1390) ?
גבעון	gbʿwn	Gibeon	H1391	Joshua 9:3.17; 10:1-2.4-6.10.12.41; 11:19; 18:25; 21:17	37	Benjamin (group B; important cities: Gibeon, Ramah, Mizpeh, Jerusalem; a levitical city; a city of Gibeonites alongside Chephirah, Beeroth and Kirjath-jearim; a big city, yet not a royal city of Canaanites)	Al Jib 31°50′52″N 35°10′59″E	
גבעת	gbʿt	Gibeath	H1394	Joshua 18:28	1	Benjamin (group B; important cities: Gibeon, Ramah, Mizpeh, Jerusalem)	? Giv'at Ye'arim 31°47′14.47″N 35°5′20.25″E	= Gibeah [of Benjamin] (H1390) ?
גבתון	gbtwn	Gibbethon	H1405	Joshua 19:44; 21:23	6	Dan (a levitical city)	? Tall Mlat, Tell el-Melat, Tel Malot 31°51′23″N 34°51′55″E; Ras Abu Hamid/Humeid31°54′12″N 34°53′28″E; formerly identified with Gibbiah, Kibbiah, Qibya 31°58′36″N 35°00′42″E	
גדר	gdr	Geder	H1445	Joshua 12:13	1	? Judah? (listed between Gezer, Debir and Hormah, Arad)	Khirbet Jedur	= Gedor (H1446)?, = Gederah (H1449)?, = Gederoth (H1450)?
גדור	gdwr	Gedor	H1446	Joshua 15:58	3	Judah (no important cities)		
גדרה	(h)gdrh	Gederah, Ha-Gederah	H1449	Joshua 15:36	2	Judah ("in the valley"; important cities: Eshtaol, Zoreah, Engannim, Tappuah, Jarmuth, Adullam, Socoh 1, Azekah)		
גדרות	gdrwt	Gederoth	H1450	Joshua 15:41	2	Judah (important cities: Lachish, Eglon, Makkedah)		
גדרתים	gdrtym	Gederothaim	H1453	Joshua 15:36	1	Judah ("in the valley"; important cities: Eshtaol, Zoreah, Engannim, Tappuah, Jarmuth, Adullam, Socoh 1, Azekah)		
גלון, גולן	glwn, gwln	Golan	H1474	Joshua 20:8; 21:27	4	Manasseh (in Bashan, east of the Jordan river; a city of refuge; a levitical city)	Sahm el-Jaulān 32°46′52″N 35°56′5″E	
גזר	gzr	Gezer	H1507	Joshua 10:33; 12:12; 16:3.10; 21:21	15	Ephraim (southern border city closest to the Mediterranean Sea; a levitical city; not far from Lachish)	Tell el-Jezer (near Karmei Yosef) 31°51′34″N 34°55′12″E	
גלגל, הגלגל	(h)glgl	Gilgal 1 [of Judah?]	H1537	Joshua 4:19-20; 5:9-10; 9:6; 10:6-7.9.15.43; 14:6; 15:7	40?	? Judah? (a point of reference in describing the northern border of Judah between Debir and Jerusalem, not far from the Jordan river, not far from Jericho - "on the eastern border of Jericho", "on the wilderness of Jericho"; mentioned alongside Adummim; all night's march distance from Gibeon)	? Tell/Khirbet el-Mafjar/Mefjir (in Jericho) 31°52′30″N 35°27′54″E; Ṣuwwanet eth-Thaniya/Jiser Abu Ghabush (in Jericho) 31°52′55″N 35°27′23″E; Nitla, Khirbet en-/Tell Jaljul (Galgala), Tell Jeljul, Birket Jiljulieh (in Jericho) 31°51′06″N 35°29′17″E; Gilgal Argaman 32°09′40″N 35°30′45″E	= Geliloth (H1553) ?; Gilgal 2 (H1537) ?
גלגל	glgl	Gilgal 2 [of ?]	H1537	Joshua 12:23	1?	? (a king of this place was defeated by Joshua, it is listed between Jokneam of Carmel, Dor and Tirzah)	? Jaljulia 32°09′13″N 34°57′06″E?; Jiljilia 32°01′39″N 35°13′11″E?	= Gilgal 1 (H1537) ?
גלה	glh	Giloh	H1542	Joshua 15:51	2	Judah ("in the mountains"; important cities: Debir, Goshen)		
	glylwt	Geliloth	H1553	Joshua 18:17	1	? Judah? (a point of reference in describing the southern border of Benjamin between Jerusalem and Beth-Hoglah, not far from the Jordan river; mentioned alongside Adummim)		= Gilgal (H1537) ?
גשן	gšn	Goshen	H1657	Joshua (10:41?; 11:16?;) 15:51	3?	Judah ("in the mountains"; important cities: Debir, Goshen)		
גת	gt	Gath	H1661	Joshua 11:22	33 [43]	Judah ? (one of the main Philistine cities)	? Tell es-Safi (near Luzit) 31°41′59″N 34°50′49″E; Tell 'Areini (near Kiryat Gat) 31°36′42″N 34°47′07″E; Tell Hamid, Ras Abu Humeid (near Ramla) 31°54′11″N 34°53′28″E; Tell en-Nejileh, Tel Nagila (between Ahuzam and Beit Kama) 31°30′08″N 34°45′28″E	
גתה חפר	gth ḥpr	Gittah-Hepher	H1662	Joshua 19:13	2	Zebulun (Zebulun's eastern? border, not far from Japhia)	? Ḫirbet Umm Ğebēl	
גתי	gty	Gittite	H1663	Joshua 13:3	10	Judah ? (one of the main Philistine cities)	see Gath (H1661)	An inhabitant of Gath (H1661)
גתרמון	gtrmwn	Gath-Rimmon [of Dan]	H1667	Joshua 19:45; 21:24	3	Dan (a levitical city)	? Tel Gerisa, Tell Jerisheh 32°05′30″N 34°48′27″E; Tell Abu Zeitun 32°05′58″N 34°50′13″E; Ras Abu Humeid 31°54′11″N 34°53′28″E	
גתרמון	gtrmwn	Gath-Rimmon [of Manasseh]	H1667	Joshua 21:25	1	Manasseh (a levitical city; west of Jordan)	Rummanah 32°31′26″N 35°12′18″E	
דבר	dbr	Debir [of Judah 1]	H1688	Joshua 10:38-39; 11:21; 12:13; 15:15.49; 21:15	11?	Judah ("in the mountains"; important cities: Debir, Goshen; a levitical city)	? Khirbet Rabud 31°25′57″N 35°00′54″E; Tell Beit Mirsim 31°27′20″N 34°54′39″E	= Kirjath-Sannah (H7158), = Kirjath-Sepher (H7158), = Debir [of Judah 2?] (H1688) ?
דבר	dbr	Debir [of Judah 2?]	H1688	Joshua (10:38-39?; 11:21?; 12:13?;) 15:7; (21:15?;)	1?	? Judah? (a point of reference in describing the northern border of Judah between Gilgal and Beth-Arabah)		= Debir [of Judah 1] (H1688) ?
דבר	dbr	Debir [of Gad]	H1688	Joshua 13:26	1?	Gad (east of Jordan)	Tell el-Husn; Tell Irbid 32°33′0″N 35°51′0″E	
הדברת	(h)dbrt	Daberath, Ha-Daberath [of Zebulun]	H1705	Joshua 19:12	1?	Zebulun (Zebulun's southern? border, between Sarid, Chisloth-Tabor and Japhia)	Hirbet Dabbureh	= Daberath [of Issahar] ?
דברת	dbrt	Daberath [of Issahar]	H1705	Joshua 21:28	2?	Issahar (a levitical city)	Daburiyya 32°41′31″N 35°22′18″E	= Daberath [of Zebulun] ?
דבשת	dbšt	Dabbasheth	H1708	Joshua 19:11	1	Zebulun (Zebulun's border, between Sarid, Maralah and Jokneam)	? Tell eš-Šemmam; Tell el-Qassīs; Tell er-Rīš	
דומה	dwmh	Dumah	H1746	Joshua 15:52	1?	Judah (important cities: Hebron)		
דאר	dʾr	Dor	H1756	Joshua 11:2; 12:23; 17:11	7	Manasseh (west of Jordan, among Issachar and Asher)	? Khirbet/Tell el-Burj 32°36′59″N 34°54′59″E	
דיבון	dybwn	Dibon	H1769	Joshua 13:9.17	10?	Reuben (east of Jordan)	? Tell Dhiban, Tall Dhiban 31°30′06″N 35°46′37″E	
דימונה	dymwnh	Dimonah	H1776	Joshua 15:22	1	Judah (southwestern territory bordering Edom; group A, important cities: Beersheba, Hormah, Ziklag)		
דלען	dlʿn	Dilean	H1810	Joshua 15:38	1	Judah (important cities: Lachish, Eglon, Makkedah)		
דמנה	dmnh	Dimnah	H1829	Joshua 21:35	1	Zebulun (a levitical city)	see Rimmon-Methoar, Remmon-Ha-Methoar (H7417)	= Rimmon-Methoar, Remmon-Ha-Methoar (H7417)?
דן	dn	Dan	H1835	Joshua 19:47	24	Dan (within Naphtali's territory?)	Tell el-Qadi/Kadi (near Dan) 33°14′55″N 35°39′11″E	= Leshem (H3959)
דנה	dnh	Dannah	H1837	Joshua 15:49	1	Judah ("in the mountains"; important cities: Debir, Goshen)		
זיף	zyp	Ziph [of Judah 1]	H2128	Joshua 15:24	1?	Judah (southwestern territory bordering Edom; group A, important cities: Beersheba, Hormah, Ziklag)	? Khirbet ez-Zeifeh 31°00′52″N 34°58′48″E	
זיף	zyp	Ziph [of Judah 2]	H2128	Joshua 15:55	8?	Judah (important cities: Gibeah, Timnah)	? Tell Zif 31°28′27″N 35°07′34″E; Khribet Ziph 31°28′31″N 35°08′06″E	
זנוח	znwḥ	Zanoah 1, Shfela of Judah	H2182	Joshua 15:34	4?	Judah ("in the valley"; important cities: Eshtaol, Zoreah, Engannim, Tappuah, Jarmuth, Adullam, Socoh 1, Azekah)	Khirbet Zanûa on the ground of Moshav Zanoah 31°43′55.91″N 34°59′57.12″E	
זנוח	znwḥ	Zanoah 2, Hill Country of Judah	H2182	Joshua 15:56	1?	Judah (important cities: Gibeah, Timnah)		
חברון	ḥbrwn	Hebron	H2275	Joshua 10:3.5.23.36.39; 11:21; 12:10; 14:13-15; 15:13.54; 20:7; 21:11.13	63	Judah (important cities: Hebron; Caleb's inheritance, not far from Debir; a city of refuge; a levitical city for Kohathites; one of the cities in the Jerusalem coalition: Jerusalem, Hebron, Jarmuth, Lachish, Eglon)	Jabla al Rahama (in Hebron) 31°31′26″N 35°06′14″E	= Kiriath-Arba (H7153)
חדשה	ḥdšh	Hadashah	H2322	Joshua 15:37	1	Judah (important cities: Lachish, Eglon, Makkedah)	Tel Sheqf	
חלן	ḥln	Holon	H2473	Joshua 15:51; 21:15	2	Judah ("in the mountains"; important cities: Debir, Goshen; a levitical city)	? Khirbet Alin; Khirbet Bism; Khirbet umm el-Amad	
חלחול	ḥlḥwl	Halhul	H2478	Joshua 15:58	1	Judah (no important cities)	Halhul 31°34′44″N 35°05′57″E	
חלי	ḥly	Hali	H2482	Joshua 19:25	1	Asher	Tel Hali Ha-Ma'aravi	
חלף	ḥlp	Heleph	H2501	Joshua 19:33	1	Naphtali	Ḫirbet 'Arbiṯa	
חלקת	ḥlqt	Helkath	H2520	Joshua 19:25; 21:31	2	Asher (a levitical city)	Tell el-Qassis (north of Jokneam); Tell el-Harbaj (Tel Regev)	
חמון	ḥmwn	Hammon	H2540	Joshua 19:28	2 or 1	Asher (northern border?)	Khirbet Umm el-ʿAwāmid	
חמטה	ḥmṭh	Humtah	H2547	Joshua 15:54	1	Judah (important cities: Hebron)		
חמת	ḥmt	Hamath [unassigned]	H2574	Joshua 13:5	36 or 25	? (north of Damascus)	Hama Castle area (in Hama) 35°08′11″N 36°44′58″E	
חמת	ḥmt	Hammath [of Naphtali]	H2575	Joshua 19:35	1	Naphtali (a fortified city)	Hamat Tiberias 32°46′6.51″N 35°32′54.43″E; Khirbet el-Qanitriyeh (Tel Raqqat)	= Hammoth-Dor (H2576) ?
	ḥmt dʾr	Hammoth-Dor	H2576	Joshua 21:32	1	Naphtali (a levitical city)	? Khirbet el-Qanitriyeh (Tel Raqqat); Khirbet Abu Shusheh	= Hammath [of Naphtali] (H2575) ?
חנתן	ḥntn	Hannathon	H2615	Joshua 19:14	1	Zebulun (Zabulun's northern border)	Tel Hanaton 32°47′08″N 35°15′25″E	
חסה	ḥsh	Hosah	H2621	Joshua 19:29	1	Asher (eastern border between Tyre and Achzib)	Tell Rashidiyeh or Khirbet el-Hos, today both in Lebanon, one S of Tyre, see here, the other SE of it, see here.	
חפר	ḥpr	Hepher	H2660	Joshua 12:17	2 or 1	? (a king of this city was defeated by Joshua)	? Tell el-Muḥaffar	a region?
חפרים	ḥprym	Haphraim	H2663	Joshua 19:19	1	Issachar		
חצור	ḥṣwr	Hazor [of Judah 1]	H2674	Joshua 15:23	1?	Judah (southwestern territory bordering Edom; group A, important cities: Beersheba, Hormah, Ziklag)		
חצור	ḥṣwr	Hazor [of Judah 2]	H2674	Joshua 15:25	1?	Judah (southwestern territory bordering Edom; group A, important cities: Beersheba, Hormah, Ziklag)	see Hezron (H2696)	= Hezron (H2696), = Kerioth[-Hezron] (H7152) ?
חצור	ḥṣwr	Hazor [of Naphtali]	H2674	Joshua 11:1.10-11.13; 12:19; 19:36	12	Naphtali (a fortified city)	Tell el Qedah, Khirbet Waqqas 33°01′03″N 35°34′05″E	
חצור חדתה	ḥṣwr ḥdth	Hazor Hadattah, Hazor-hadattah	H2675	Joshua 15:25	1	Judah (southwestern territory bordering Edom; group A, important cities: Beersheba, Hormah, Ziklag)	el-Ḫuḍēra	
חצר גדה	ḥṣr gdh	Hazar-Gaddah	H2693	Joshua 15:27	1	Judah (southwestern territory bordering Edom; group A, important cities: Beersheba, Hormah, Ziklag)		
חצרון	ḥṣrwn (qrywt ḥṣrwn ?)	Hezron	H2696	Joshua 15:3.25	2	Judah (southwestern territory bordering Edom; group A, important cities: Beersheba, Hormah, Ziklag; southern border, to the east of Kadesh-Barnea)		= Hazor [of Judah 2] (H2674), = Kerioth[-Hezron] (H7152) ?
חצר סוסה	ḥṣr swsh	Hazar-Susah	H2701	Joshua 19:5	1	Simeon within Judah (listed between Hormah, Ziklag, Beth-Marcaboth and Beth-Lebaoth)		= Sansannah (H5578) ?
חצר שועל	ḥṣr šwʿl	Hazar-Shual	H2705	Joshua 15:28; 19:3	4	Simeon within Judah (southwestern territory bordering Edom; group A, important cities: Beersheba, Hormah, Ziklag)		
חוקקה	ḥwqqh	Hukkok	H2712	Joshua 19:34	2 or 1	Naphtali (south-western corner? with Zebulun on the south, Asher on the west and Judah on Jordan towards the east?)	? Huqoq 32°53′5″N 35°28′44″E	
חרם	ḥrm	Horem	H2765	Joshua 19:38	1	Naphtali (a fortified city)		
חרמה	ḥrmh	Hormah	H2767	Joshua 12:14; 15:30; 19:4	9	Simeon within Judah (southwestern territory bordering Edom; group A, important cities: Beersheba, Hormah, Ziklag)	? Tell el-Milh, Tel Malhata 31°13′02″N 35°01′33″E; Hirbet el-Mesas, Khirbet el-Meshash, Tel Masos 31°13′00″N 34°58′00″E; Tell el-Khuweilifeh, Tel Halif 31°22′58″N 34°51′59″E	
חשבון	ḥšbwn	Heshbon	H2809	Joshua 9:10; 12:2.5; 13:10.17.21.26-27; 21:39	38	Reuben, later Gad (east of Jordan, border between Reuben and Gad; a levitical city of Gad)	Tell Ḥesbān (in Hisban) 31°48′03″N 35°48′32″E	
חשמון	ḥšmwn	Heshmon	H2829	Joshua 15:27	1	Judah (southwestern territory bordering Edom; group A, important cities: Beersheba, Hormah, Ziklag)		
טלם	ṭlm	Telem	H2928	Joshua 15:24	1	Judah (southwestern territory bordering Edom; group A, important cities: Beersheba, Hormah, Ziklag)		
יבוס	ybws	Jebus	H2982	-	4 [45]	Benjamin, Judah	see Jerusalem (H3389)	= Jerusalem (H3389). Mentioned indirectly as Jebusi (H2983)
יבוסי, היבוסי	(h)ybwsy	Jebusi, Ha-Jebusi	H2983	Joshua 15:8; 18:16.28	41	Benjamin (group B; important cities: Gibeon, Ramah, Mizpeh, Jerusalem; northern border of Judah, southern border of Benjamin), Judah (eventually)	see Jerusalem (H3389)	= Jerusalem (H3389), also an inhabitant of Jebus (H2982)
יבלעם	yblʿm	Ibleam	H2991	Joshua 17:11	3	Manasseh (west of Jordan, among Issachar and Asher)	? Khirbet Belameh/ Bel'ameh/ Balameh, Sheikh Mansur 32°26′45″N 35°17′29″E; Yubla, Khirbet Yebla 32°34′33″N 35°28′10″E	
יבנאל	ybnʾl	Jabneel [of Judah]	H2995	Joshua 15:11	1	Judah (northern border, west or north-west of Ekron, between mount Baalah and the Mediterranean Sea)	Tel Yavne south of the modern village of Yavne 31°51′58″N 34°44′47″E	
יבנאל	ybnʾl	Jabneel [of Naphtali]	H2995	Joshua 19:33	1	Naphtali		
יגור	ygwr	Jagur	H3017	Joshua 15:21	1	Judah (southwestern territory bordering Edom; group A, important cities: Beersheba, Hormah, Ziklag)	Hirbet Sumrā	
ידאלה	ydʾlh	Idalah	H3030	Joshua 19:15	1	Zebulun	Hirbet el-Huwāra	
יהד	yhd	Jehud	H3055	Joshua 19:45	1	Dan	Tell Yehud (Tell Al-Yahudiya) within the modern city od Yehud	
יהצה	yhṣh	Jahaza, Jahaz	H3096	Joshua 13:18; 21:36	9	Reuben (east of Jordan; a levitical city)	? Hirbet al-Mudayyina 31°35′19″N 35°54′28″E; Hirbet Libb 31°36′23″N 35°45′41″E; Galul, Tell Jalul 31°43′10″N 35°51′21″E; Umm al-Walid 31°38′47″N 35°53′42″E; Khirbet Aleiyan; Khirbet Remeil	
יזרעאל	yzrʿʾl	Jezreel [of Judah]	H3157	Joshua 15:56	2?	Judah (important cities: Gibeah, Timnah)		
יזרעאל	yzrʿʾl	Jezreel [of Issachar]	H3157	Joshua 17:16; 19:18	32?	Issachar (near Manasseh's and Ephraim's territory)	Tell Jezreel (near Yizre'el, Zir'in) 32°33′28″N 35°19′41″E	
יוטה	ywṭh	Juttah	H3194	Joshua 15:55; 21:16	2	Judah (important cities: Gibeah, Timnah; a levitical city)	Yattah 31°26′52″N 35°05′24″E	
ינוחה	ynwḥh	Janohah, Janoah	H3239	Joshua 16:6-7	2	Ephraim (Ephraim's eastern border, between Taanath-Shiloh and Jericho)	? Khirbet Yanun; Nebi Nun	
ינים, ינום	ynym, ynwm	Janim, Janum	H3241	Joshua 15:53	1	Judah (important cities: Hebron)		
יעזר	yʿzr	Jazer	H3270	Joshua 13:25; 21:39	13	Gad (east of Jordan; a levitical city)	? Khirbat Jazzir, Hirbet Gazzir (south of Al-Salt) 32°00′17″N 35°44′21″E?; Khirbet es-Sar (west of Amman) 31°56′42″N 35°49′47″E; Khirbet es-Sireh (west of Amman) 31°57′25″N 35°48′53″E; Yahuz/Yajuz/Yaguz 32°01′21″N 35°55′16″E; Kom Yahuz/Yajuz 32°01′54″N 35°54′38″E; Khirbat al-Yadudeh 31°50′47″N 35°54′46″E; Beit Zerah, Hirbet Bet Zer'a; Tell el-'Areme	
יפו	ypw	Japho	H3305	Joshua 19:46	4	? (border of Dan's territory ran to the south? of the city)	Tell of Jaffa 32°03′08″N 34°45′11″E	
יפיע	ypyʿ	Japhia	H3309	Joshua 19:12	1	Zebulun (Zebulun's southern? border, between Chisloth-Tabor, Daberath and Gittah-Hepher)	Yafa 32°41′09″N 35°16′28″E; el-Mešhed	
יפלטי, היפלטי	(h)yplṭy	Japhleti, Ha-Japhleti	H3311	Joshua 16:3	1	Ephraim (southern border, between Bethel, Ataroth and the lower Beth-Horon)		inhabitants of a city of a similar name or members of a clan
יפתח	yptḥ	Jiphtah, Jephthah	H3316	Joshua 15:43	1	Judah (important cities: Libnah, Keilah, Achzib, Maresha)		
יפתחאל	yptḥʾl	Jipthah-El [a valley]	H3317	Joshua 19:14.27	2	Zebulun (border between Asher and Zebulun)	? Wadi al-Mālik; Sahl el-Battōf; Wadi ʾAbellīn	a valley, but possibly also a city of the same name
יקדעם	yqdʿm	Jokdeam	H3347	Joshua 15:56	1	Judah (important cities: Gibeah, Timnah)		
יקנעם	yqnʿm	Jokneam	H3362	Joshua 12:22; 19:11; 21:34	3	Zebulun (Zebulun's border, north-western? corner; in Carmel; a levitical city)	Tel Yokneam in the northern part of the modern city of Yokneam Illit 32°39′51″N 35°06′6.3″E	
יקתאל	yqtʾl	Joktheel	H3371	Joshua 15:38	1	Judah (important cities: Lachish, Eglon, Makkedah)		
יראון	yrʾwn	Iron	H3375	Joshua 19:38	1	Naphtali (a fortified city)	? Yaroun 33°04′50″N 35°25′21″E	
ירושלם	yrwšlm	Jerusalem	H3389	Joshua 10:1.3.5.23; 12:10; 15:8.63; 18:28	643	Benjamin (initially; group B; important cities: Gibeon, Ramah, Mizpeh, Jerusalem; northern border of Judah; not very far from Ai, Gibeon; one of the cities in the Jerusalem coalition: Jerusalem, Hebron, Jarmuth, Lachish, Eglon), Judah (eventually)	City of David (in Jerusalem) 31°46′26″N 35°14′09″E	= Jebusi (H2983)
יריחו	yryḥw	Jericho	H3405	Joshua 2:1-3; 3:16; 4:13.19; 5:10.13; 6:1-2.25-26; 7:2; 8:2; 9:3; 10:1.28.30; 12:9; 16:1.7; 18:12.21; 20:8; 24:11	57	Benjamin (group A; important cities: Bethel, Jericho; north-eastern border of Benjamin's territory; south-eastern border of Ephraim's territory; not far from the Jordan river)	Tell es-Sultan (in Jericho) 31°52′16″N 35°26′39″E	
ירמוח	yrmwt	Jarmuth [of Judah]	H3412	Joshua 10:3.5.23; 12:11; 15:35	6	Judah ("in the valley"; important cities: Eshtaol, Zoreah, Engannim, Tappuah, Jarmuth, Adullam, Socoh 1, Azekah; one of the cities in the Jerusalem coalition: Jerusalem, Hebron, Jarmuth, Lachish, Eglon)	? Khirbet el-Yarmuk, Tel Yarmuth 31°42′31″N 34°58′30″E	
ירמוח	yrmwt	Jarmuth [of Issachar]	H3412	Joshua 21:29	1	Issachar (a levitical city)	Kōkab el-Hawā; Ēn el-Ğirānī; En ha-Yadid	
ירפאל	yrpʾl	Irpeel	H3416	Joshua 18:27	1	Benjamin (group B; important cities: Gibeon, Ramah, Mizpeh, Jerusalem)	A nameless site near Rāfāt	
יתיר	ytyr	Jattir	H3492	Joshua 15:48; 21:14	4	Judah ("in the mountains"; important cities: Debir, Goshen; a levitical city)	Khirbet Attir 31°21′09″N 35°00′58″E	
יתלה	ytlh	Jethlah	H3494	Joshua 19:42	1	Dan		
יתנן	ytnn	Ithnan	H3497	Joshua 15:23	1	Judah (southwestern territory bordering Edom; group A, important cities: Beersheba, Hormah, Ziklag)		
כבול	kbwl	Cabul	H3521	Joshua 19:27	1	Asher	Kabul 32°52′11″N 35°12′8″E	
כבון	kbwn	Cabbon	H3522	Joshua 15:40	1	Judah (important cities: Lachish, Eglon, Makkedah)		
כנרת	knrt	Chinnereth	H3672	Joshua (11:2?;) 19:35	3?	Naphtali (a fortified city)	Tel el-'Oreimeh (Arab.)/Tel Kinrot (hebr.) (northwestern shore of the Sea of Galilee) 32°51′38″N 35°30′26″E	
כסיל	ksyl	Chesil	H3686	Joshua 15:30	1	Judah (southwestern territory bordering Edom; group A, important cities: Beersheba, Hormah, Ziklag; listed between Azem, Eltolad and Hormah, Ziklag)		= Bethul (H1329, Simeon's) ?
כסולת, הכסולת	(h)kswlt	Chesulloth	H3694	Joshua 19:18	1	Issachar		
כסלון	kslwn	Chesalon, Kesalon	H3693	Joshua 15:10	2	Judah	Tel Kesalon, just north of Moshav Kesalon 31°46′26″N 35°2′58″E	
כסלת תבר	kslt tbr	Chisloth-Tabor	H3696	Joshua 19:12	1	Zebulun (Zebulun's southern? border, not far from Sarid)	? Iksal; Hirbet et-Tireh	
כפירה, הכפירה	(h)kpyrh	Chephirah, Ha-Chephirah	H3716	Joshua 9:17; 18:26	4	Benjamin (group B; important cities: Gibeon, Ramah, Mizpeh, Jerusalem; a city of Gibeonites alongside Gibeon, Beeroth and Kirjath-jearim)	Khirbet Kefireh 31.8309°N 35.106769°E	
כפרהעמנה, כפרהעמני	kpr(h)ʿmnh, kpr(h)ʿmny	Chephar Ammoni, Kephar Ha-Ammoni	H3726	Joshua 18:24	1	Benjamin (group A; important cities: Bethel, Jericho)		
כרמל	krml	Carmel [of Judah]	H3760	Joshua 15:55	7	Judah (important cities: Gibeah, Timnah)	? Khirbet el-Kirmil 31°25′21″N 35°07′52″E	
כרמל	krml	Carmel [of Asher]	H3760	Joshua 19:26	1	Asher		possibly only a mountain and not a city
כתליש	ktlyš	Kithlish	H3798	Joshua 15:40	1	Judah (important cities: Lachish, Eglon, Makkedah)		
לבאות	lbʾwt	Lebaoth	H3822	Joshua 15:32	1	Judah (southwestern territory bordering Edom; group A, important cities: Beersheba, Hormah, Ziklag; listed after Hormah, Ziklag and before Ain, Rimmon)		= Beth-Lebaoth (H1034, Simeon's) ?
לבנה	lbnh	Libnah	H3841	Joshua 10:29.31-32.39; 12:15; 15:42; 21:13	16 or 15	Judah (important cities: Libnah, Keilah, Achzib, Maresha; a levitical city; not far from Makkedah and Lachish)	? Tell Zeita (near Gal On) 31°37′45″N 34°49′49″E; Tell Burnat (near Beit Nir) 31°37′47″N 34°52′24″E	
לוזה	lwzh	Luz	H3870	Joshua 16:2; 18:13	7	Benjamin (southern border of Ephraim's territory and northern border of Benjamin's territory between Beth-Aven and Ataroth-Adar; the former name of Bethel and, possibly, a twin city of Bethel)	see Bethel (H1008)	= Bethel (H1008)
לחמס	lḥms	Lahmas	H3903	Joshua 15:40	1	Judah (important cities: Lachish, Eglon, Makkedah)		
לכיש	lkyš	Lachish	H3923	Joshua 10:3.5.23.31-35; 12:11; 15:39	24	Judah (important cities: Lachish, Eglon, Makkedah; one of the cities in the Jerusalem coalition: Jerusalem, Hebron, Jarmuth, Lachish, Eglon; not far from Libnah, Gezer and Eglon)	? Tell ed-Duweir (near Lakhish) 31°33′55″N 34°50′55″E; Tell Eitun/ Eiton 31°29′20″N 34°55′42″E; formerly identified with Tell el-Hesi (near Shalva) 31°32′51″N 34°43′49″E	
לקום	lqwm	Lakkum	H3946	Joshua 19:33	1	Naphtali (not far from the Jordan river)		
לשם	lšm	Leshem	H3959	Joshua 19:47	2	Dan (within Naphtali's territory?)	see Dan (H1835)	= Dan (H1835)
מגדו	mgdw	Megiddo	H4023	Joshua 12:21; 17:11	12	Manasseh (west of Jordan, among Issachar and Asher)	Tell al Mutesellim, just north of kibbutz Megiddo 32°35′08″N 35°11′04″E	
מגדלאל	mgdlʾl	Migdal-El	H4027	Joshua 19:38	1	Naphtali (a fortified city)		
מגדלגד	mgdlgd	Migdal-Gad	H4028	Joshua 15:37	1	Judah (important cities: Lachish, Eglon, Makkedah)	Tell el-Hesi 31°32′52″N 34°43′49″E	
מדון	mdwn	Madon, Maron	H4068	Joshua 11:1; 12:19	2	? (not very far from Hazor of Naphtali, Shimrom of Zebulun and Achshaph of Asher)	? Qarnei Hattin 32°48′00″N 35°27′34″E; Marun er-Ras 33°06′27″N 35°26′41″E; Tell el-Khureibeh	
מדין	mdyn	Middin	H4081	Joshua 15:61	1	Judah ("in the wilderness"; important cities: En-Gedi)		
מדמנה	mdmnh	Madmannah, Madmen	H4086	Joshua 15:31	1	Judah (southwestern territory bordering Edom; group A, important cities: Beersheba, Hormah, Ziklag; listed between Hormah, Ziklag and Sansannah, Lebaoth)		= Beth-Marcaboth (H1024, Simeon's) ?
מולדה	mwldh	Moladah	H4137	Joshua 15:26; 19:2	4	Simeon within Judah (southwestern territory bordering Edom; group A, important cities: Beersheba, Hormah, Ziklag)		
מפעת, מיפעת	mpʿt, mypʿt	Mephaath	H4158	Joshua 13:18; 21:37	4	Reuben (east of Jordan; a levitical city)	Umm ar-Rasas 31°30′2.83″N 35°55′12.95″E	
מחנים	mḥnym	Mahanaim	H4266	Joshua 13:26.30; 21:38	13	Gad (east of Jordan; border between Gad and Manasseh; a levitical city)	? Tell/Tullul edh-Dhahab el-Gharbi 32°11′09″N 35°41′12″E; Tell Hajjaj 32°08′58″N 35°41′31″E; Khirbet Mahneh 32°21′48″N 35°45′16″E?; Tell er-Ruheil, Tall Rehil 32°11′18″N 35°48′27″E; Khirbet Saleikhat, Maqbarat es Sleikhat32°19′53″N 35°35′54″E; 'Ajlun 32°19′45″N 35°45′15″E?	
מידבא	mydbʾ	Medeba	H4311	Joshua 13:9.16	5	Reuben (east of Jordan)	Madaba 31°43′N 35°48′E	
מי הירקון	my (h)yrqwn	Me-Jarkon, Me-Ha-Jarkon	H4313	Joshua 19:46	1	Dan	? Tell Qasīle; Tell Gerise; Nahr el-Baride;	Possibly not a city, but a river known as Nahr el-'Ōğā
מכמתת, המכמתת	(h)mkmtt	Michmethah, Ha-Michmethah [of Ephraim]	H4366	Joshua 16:6	1?	Ephraim (Ephraim's eastern border, between the upper Beth-Horon and Taanath-Shiloh)	? Khirbet Ibn Naşer; Khirbet Kafr Beta; Jebel el-Tuwanik	= Michmethah [of Manasseh] (H0836) ?
מכמתת, המכמתת	(h)mkmtt	Michmethah, Ha-Michmethah [of Manasseh]	H4366	Joshua 17:7	1?	Manasseh (not far from Shechem, not far from Ephraim's border)	see Michmethah [of Ephraim] (H0836)	= Michmethah [of Ephraim] (H0836) ?
מעון	mʿwn	Maon	H4584	Joshua 15:55	5?	Judah (important cities: Gibeah, Timnah)	Khirbet Ma'in (Tell Maon) (3 km west of moshav Maon) 31°24′34″N 35°08′02″E	
מעלה עקרבים	mʿlh ʿqrbym	Maaleh-Acrabbim	H4610	Joshua 15:3	3	Judah (southern border, a place between Kadesh-Barnea and the Dead Sea)		a mountain?
מערה	mʿrh	Mearah	H4632	Joshua 13:4	1	Asher ? (beside Sidon)	? Muġar Jezzin; Ḫirbet 'Āra	
מערת	mʿrt	Maarath	H4638	Joshua 15:59	1	Judah (no important cities)		
מצה, המצה	(h)mṣh	Mozah, Ha-Mozah	H4681	Joshua 18:26	1	Benjamin (group B; important cities: Gibeon, Ramah, Mizpeh, Jerusalem)	Tel Mozah within the village area of modern Motza 31.794452°N 35.163778°E	
מצפה, המצפה	(h)mṣph	Mizpeh, Ha-Mizpeh [of Judah]	H4708	Joshua 15:38	1??	Judah (important cities: Lachish, Eglon, Makkedah)		= Mizpeh [of Benjamin] (H4708) ?
מצפה, המצפה	(h)mṣph	Mizpeh, Ha-Mizpeh [of Benjamin]	H4708	Joshua 18:26	1??	Benjamin (group B; important cities: Gibeon, Ramah, Mizpeh, Jerusalem)	Tell en-Nasbeh 31°53′07″N 35°12′59″E	= Mizpeh [of Judah] (H4708) ?
מצפה, המצפה	(h)mṣph	Mizpeh, Ha-Mizpeh [of Manasseh?, Naphtali?]	H4709	Joshua 11:3.8	2??	Manasseh?, Naphtali? (under Mount Hermon)	? el-Biqā‘ 34°0′32″N 36°8′43″E; Merǧ ‘Ajjūn 33°17′43″N 35°37′48″E; Wādī et-Teim 33°17′43″N 35°37′48″E; Qal'at Nimrūd 33°15′11″N 35°42′53″E and Bānijās 33°14′45″N 35°41′35″E; in the Golan Heights 33°2′43″N 35°43′45″E	Possibly not a city
מקדה	mqdh	Makkedah	H4719	Joshua 10:10.16-17.21.28-29; 12:16; 15:41	9	Judah (important cities: Lachish, Eglon, Makkedah; not far from Libnah)	? Khirbet el-Kôm/ Qom at al-Kum 31°31′57″N 34°57′46″E; Mughar 31°50′23″N 34°46′58″E?; Deir edh/ed-Dhibban 31°40′23″N 34°53′33″E?; Tell es-Safi 31°41′59″N 34°50′49″E; Khirbet el-Kheishum 31°43′43″N 34°57′13″E?; Tell Bornat/ Burnat 31°37′47″N 34°52′24″E; Khirbet Beit Maqdum 31°31′40″N 34°58′04″E; Qal'at el-Muwaqdah 31°55′29″N 35°00′33″E?	
מראשה	mrʾšh	Mareshah	H4762	Joshua 15:44	6	Judah (important cities: Libnah, Keilah, Achzib, Maresha)	Tell Sandahanna 31°35′34″N 34°53′54″E	
מרעלה	mrʿlh	Maralah	H4831	Joshua 19:11	1	Zebulun (Zebulun's border, between Sarid and Dabbasheth, Jokneam)	? Tell Ġalṭa; Tell Ṯōra; Tell eš-Šemmān; Tell el-Bēḍa	
משאל	mšʾl	Misheal, Mishal	H4861	Joshua 19:26; 21:30	2	Asher (not far from Carmel; a levitical city)	? Tell en-Naḥl; Tell Keisan 32°52′23.16″N 35°9′2.88″E; Tell Abu Hawam 32°48′03″N 35°01′09″E	
משרפת מים	mšrpt mym	Misrephoth-Maim	H4956	Joshua 11:8; 13:6	2	Asher ? (not far from Sidon)		
נבשן	(h)nbšn	Nibshan, Ha-Nibshan	H5044	Joshua 15:62	1	Judah ("in the wilderness"; important cities: En-Gedi)	? Khirbet el-Maqāri; Ēn el-Ġuwēr; Ēn et-Turābe	
נהלל	nhll	Nahallal, Nahalal	H5096	Joshua 19:15; 21:35	3	Zebulun (a levitical city)	? Tell en-Nahl; Tell el-Beida; Ma'lul	
נעה, הנעה	(h)nʿh	Neah, Ha-Neah	H5269	Joshua 19:13	1	Zebulun (Zabulun's eastern? border)	? Tell el-Wāwiyāt; Tell el-Buṭme; Sahl el-Baṭṭōf	
נעיאל	nʿyʾl	Neiel	H5272	Joshua 19:27	1	Asher (between the valley of Jipthah-El and Cabul)	Khirbet Ya'nīn; formerly identified with Tamra	
נעמה	nʿmh	Naamah	H5279	Joshua 15:41	1	Judah (important cities: Lachish, Eglon, Makkedah)	? Tel beside kibbutz Na'an	
נערתה	nʿrth	Naarath	H5292	Joshua 16:7	1	Ephraim (Ephraim's eastern border, not far from Jericho)	Khirbet Auja el-Foqa	
נציב	nṣyb	Nezib	H5334	Joshua 15:43	1	Judah (important cities: Libnah, Keilah, Achzib, Maresha)	Khirbet Bēt Neṣīb eš-Šerqīye	
נקב, הנקב	(h)nqb	Nekeb, Ha-Nekeb	H5346	Joshua 19:33	1	Naphtali		
סכות	skwt	Succoth	H5523	Joshua 13:27	14 or 13	Gad (east of Jordan)	? Deir Alla 32°11′48″N 35°37′15″E	
סככה	skkh	Secacah	H5527	Joshua 15:61	1	Judah ("in the wilderness"; important cities: En-Gedi)		
סלכה	slkh	Salcah	H5548	Joshua 12:5; 13:11	4	? Manasseh? (east of Jordan; former territory of Og, king of Bashan)	? Salkhad 32°29′30″N 36°42′40″E	
סנסנה	snsnh	Sansannah	H5578	Joshua 15:31	1	Judah (southwestern territory bordering Edom; group A, important cities: Beersheba, Hormah, Ziklag; listed between Hormah, Ziklag, Madmannah and Lebaoth)		= Hazar-Susah (H2701, Simeon's) ?
עבדון	ʿbdwn	Abdon	H5658	Joshua 21:30	2	Asher (a levitical city)	Khirbet ʿAbdeh	
עברן	ʿbrn	Hebron, Ebron	H5683	Joshua 19:28	1	Asher (northern border?)		= Abdon (H5658) ?
עגלון	ʿglwn	Eglon	H5700	Joshua 10:3.5.23.34.36-37; 12:12; 15:39	8	Judah (important cities: Lachish, Eglon, Makkedah; one of the cities in the Jerusalem coalition: Jerusalem, Hebron, Jarmuth, Lachish, Eglon; not far from Lachish and Hebron)	? Tel Eiton/ Eitun Aaton/ Eton/ Aitun 31°29′20″N 34°55′42″E; Tel Hasi, Tell el-Hesi (near Tel Ajlan) 31°32′01″N 34°43′50″E; Tel Beit Mirsim 31°27′20″N 34°54′39″E	
עדיתים	ʿdytym	Adithaim	H5723	Joshua 15:36	1	Judah ("in the valley"; important cities: Eshtaol, Zoreah, Engannim, Tappuah, Jarmuth, Adullam, Socoh 1, Azekah)		
עדלם	ʿdlm	Adullam	H5725	Joshua 12:15; 15:35	8	Judah ("in the valley"; important cities: Eshtaol, Zoreah, Engannim, Tappuah, Jarmuth, Adullam, Socoh 1, Azekah)	? Khirbet Sheik Madkur/ Madkhur, Khurbet esh-Sheikh Madkour, ʿAīd el Mâ, `Eîd el Mieh 31°38′59″N 35°00′09″E	
עדעדה	ʿdʿdh	Adadah	H5735	Joshua 15:22	1	Judah (southwestern territory bordering Edom; group A, important cities: Beersheba, Hormah, Ziklag)		
עדר	ʿdr	Eder	H5740	Joshua 15:21	1	Judah (southwestern territory bordering Edom; group A, important cities: Beersheba, Hormah, Ziklag)		
עוים	ʿwym	Avites	H5757	Joshua 13:3	3	Judah ? (Philistia)		Inhabitants of Ivvah/Avva (H5755) or Avim (H5761)
עוים	(h)ʿwym	Avim, Ha-Avim	H5761	Joshua 18:23	1	Benjamin (group A; important cities: Bethel, Jericho)		
עזה	ʿzh	Gaza, Azzah	H5804	Joshua 10:41; 11:22; 15:47	21 [23]	Judah (by the sea; important cities: Ekron, Ashdod, Gaza)	? Tell Harube, Tell 'Azza/Gaza (in Gaza City) 31°30′21″N 34°27′39″E; formerly identified with Tall al-Ajjul 31°28′04″N 34°24′16″E	
עזקה	ʿzqh	Azekah	H5825	Joshua 10:10-11; 15:35	7	Judah ("in the valley"; important cities: Eshtaol, Zoreah, Engannim, Tappuah, Jarmuth, Adullam, Socoh 1, Azekah)	Tell Zakariya/ Zakariyeh 31°42′02″N 34°56′10″E	
עזתי	ʿzty	Gazathite	H5841	Joshua 13:3	2	Judah	see Gaza (H5804)	An inhabitant of Gaza (H5804)
עטרות	ʿṭrwt	Ataroth [of Ephraim 2]	H5852	Joshua 16:7	1	Ephraim (Ephraim's eastern border, between Taanath-Shiloh, Janohah and Jericho)	? Chirbet el-‘Ōǧa el-Fōqa 31°56′50″N 35°23′58″E; Tell eš-Šēch eḏ Ḏijāb 32°02′48″N 35°25′48″E; Tell el-Mazār 32°07′56″N 35°29′19″E	= Ataroth [of Ephraim 1] (H5852) ?, = Ataroth-Addar (H5853) ?
עטרות	ʿṭrwt	Ataroth [of Ephraim 1]	H5852	Joshua 16:2	1	Ephraim (southern border, between Bethel and the lower Beth-Horon)	? 'Atara 32°00′09″N 35°12′23″E	= Ataroth [of Ephraim 2] (H5852) ?, = Ataroth-Addar (H5853) ?
עטרות אדר	ʿṭrwt ʾdr	Ataroth-Addar	H5853	Joshua 16:5; 18:13	2	Ephraim?, Benjamin? (Ephraim's eastern border, not far from the upper Beth-Horon; northern border of Benjamin's territory between Luz-Bethel and the lower Beth-Choron)	see Ataroth [of Ephraim 1] (H5852)	= Ataroth [of Ephraim 1] (H5852) ?, = Ataroth [of Ephraim 2] (H5852) ?
עי, העי	(h)ʿy	Ai, Ha-Ai	H5857	Joshua 7:2-5; 8:1-3.9-12.14.17-18.20-21.23-26.28-29; 9:3; 10:1-2; 12:9	38 or 36	Benjamin? (beside Bethel; a small town near Beth-Aven, to the east of Bethel)	? Et-Tell (near Deir Dibwan) 31°55′00″N 35°15′41″E; Khirbet el-Maqatir (between Deir Dibwan and Beitin) 31°54′55″N 35°14′59″E; Khirbet Haiyan 31°54′18″N 35°16′17″E; Khirbet Nisya/Nisieh (near Psagot) 31°53′48″N 35°13′45″E	
עיים	ʿyym	Iim	H5864	Joshua 15:29	2 or 1	Judah (southwestern territory bordering Edom; group A, important cities: Beersheba, Hormah, Ziklag)		
עין	ʿyn	Ain	H5871	Joshua 15:32; 19:7; 21:16	4	Simeon within Judah (southwestern territory bordering Edom; group A, important cities: Beersheba, Hormah, Ziklag; a levitical city)	see Rimmon, Remmon (H7417)	= En Rimmon
עין גדי	ʿyn gdy	En-Gedi	H5872	Joshua 15:62	6	Judah ("in the wilderness"; important cities: En-Gedi)	? Tell el-Jurn, Tel Goren 31°27′54″N 35°23′21″E	
עין גנים	ʿyn gnym	En-Gannim [of Judah]	H5873	Joshua 15:34	1	Judah ("in the valley"; important cities: Eshtaol, Zoreah, Engannim, Tappuah, Jarmuth, Adullam, Socoh 1, Azekah)		
עין גנים	ʿyn gnym	Anem, En-Gannim [of Issachar]	H5873	Joshua 19:21; 21:29	2	Issachar (a levitical city)	? Beit Jann 32°57′55″N 35°22′46″E; Khirbet ed-Dir; el-Abeidiyeh 32°41′21″N 35°33′42″E	
עין דר	ʿyndr	Endor	H5874	Joshua 17:11	3	Manasseh (west of Jordan, among Issachar and Asher)	? Tell 'el-'gul; Hirbet Safsafe	
עין חדה	ʿyn ḥdh	En-Haddah	H5876	Joshua 19:21	1	Issachar		
עין חצור	ʿyn ḥṣwr	En-Hazor	H5877	Joshua 19:37	1	Naphtali (a fortified city)		
עינם, העינם	(h)ʿynm	Enam, Ha-Enam, Enaim	H5879	Joshua 15:34	2	Judah ("in the valley"; important cities: Eshtaol, Zoreah, Engannim, Tappuah, Jarmuth, Adullam, Socoh 1, Azekah)		
עין תפוח	ʿyn tpwḥ	En-Tappuah	H5887	Joshua 17:7	1	Ephraim ?, Manasseh ? (border between Ephraim and Manasseh)		= Tappuah [Ephraim's city in Manasseh's territory] (8599) ?
עירהמלח	ʿyr(h)mlḥ	Ir Melach, Ir Ha-Melach (City of Salt)	H5898	Joshua 15:62	1	Judah ("in the wilderness"; important cities: En-Gedi)		
עיר שמש	ʿyr šmš	Ir-Shemesh	H5905	Joshua 19:41	1	Dan		
עלמון	ʿlmwn	Almon	H5960	Joshua 21:18	1	Benjamin (a levitical city)	Khirbet Almit 31°49′25.5″N 35°16′28″E	
עמה	ʿmh	Ummah	H5981	Joshua 19:30	1	Asher (south-eastern coastal territory of Asher)		
עמעד	ʿmʿd	Amad	H6008	Joshua 19:26	1	Asher	? Tell Amr	
ענב	ʿnb	Anab	H6024	Joshua 11:21; 15:50	2	Judah ("in the mountains"; important cities: Debir, Goshen)		
ענים	ʿnym	Anim	H6044	Joshua 15:50	1	Judah ("in the mountains"; important cities: Debir, Goshen)		
ענתות	ʿntwt	Anathoth	H6068	Joshua 21:18	13	Benjamin (a levitical city)	? 'Anata 31°48′33″N 35°15′29″E?; Ras el-Kharrubeh 31°48′06″N 35°15′12″E??; Khirbet Deir es-Sidd 31°48′36″N 35°16′30″E	
עפני	(h)ʿpny	Ophni, Ha-Ophni	H6078	Joshua 18:24	1	Benjamin (group A; important cities: Bethel, Jericho)		
עפרה	ʿprh	Ophrah	H6084	Joshua 18:23	7 or 1	Benjamin (group A; important cities: Bethel, Jericho)	? Taybeh, et-Taiyibeh/ Taiyiba/ Taiyibe/ Tayyibeh 31°57′09″N 35°18′10″E; Beitin 31°55′37″N 35°14′19″E	
עצם	ʿṣm	Azem	H6107	Joshua 15:29; 19:3	3	Simeon within Judah (southwestern territory bordering Edom; group A, important cities: Beersheba, Hormah, Ziklag)		
עצמונה	ʿṣmwnh	Azmon	H6111	Joshua 15:4	3	Judah (southern border; to the west of the river of Egypt, not far from the Mediterranean Sea)		
עקרון	ʿqrwn	Ekron	H6138	Joshua 13:3; 15:11.45.46; 19:43	22 [24]	Judah (by the sea; important cities: Ekron, Ashdod, Gaza; northern border of Philistia?; near Judah's northern border); Dan (border city between Dan and Judah?)	Khirbet el-Muqanna (near Yad Binyamin) 31°46′44″N 34°51′00″E; formerly identified with Aqir 31°51′40″N 34°49′23″E, Zikrin 31°39′48″N 34°51′38″E, Qatra 31°49′19″N 34°46′39″E	
עקרוני	ʿqrwny	Ekronite	H6139	Joshua 13:3	2	Judah (one of the main Philistine cities)	see Ekron (H6138)	An inhabitant of Ekron (H6138)
הערבה	(h)ʿrbh	Arabah, Ha-Arabah	H6160	Joshua 18:18	2?	Benjamin? (southern border of Benjamin, close to Beth-Hoglah and the Jordan river)		= Beth-Arabah [of Benjamin] (H1026) ?
ערד	ʿrd	Arad	H6166	Joshua 12:14	4	Judah?	Tel Arad 31°16′52″N 35°7′34″E	
ערוער	ʿrwʿr	Aroer [of Reuben]	H6177	Joshua 12:2; 13:9.16	15 or 14	Reuben (east of Jordan, on the bank of the river Arnon, in the middle of the river)	? Khirbet 'Ara'ir at 'Ara'ir 31°28′16″N 35°49′10″E	
ערוער	ʿrwʿr	Aroer [of Gad]	H6177	Joshua 13:25	2 or 1	Gad (east of Jordan, not far from Rabbah of Amon)	Tell el-‘Umeiri	
עשן	ʿšn	Ashan	H6228	Joshua 15:42; 19:7	4	Simeon within Judah (important cities: Libnah, Keilah, Achzib, Maresha)	? Tell ej-Judeideh	
עשתרות	ʿštrwt	Ashtaroth	H6252	Joshua 9:10; 12:4; 13:12.31	12	Manasseh (east of Jordan; in Bashan)	? Tell Ashtarah 32°48′15″N 36°00′56″E; Al-Shaykh Saad, Sheikh Sa'ad as Karnaim 32°50′11″N 36°02′10″E	
עתה קצין	ʿth qṣyn	Ittah-Kazin	H6278	Joshua 19:13	1	Zebulun (Zebulun's eastern? border)	? Ḫirbet Bēyīn; Ḫirbet Felīh	
עתר	ʿtr	Ether	H6281	Joshua 15:42; 19:7	2	Simeon within Judah (important cities: Libnah, Keilah, Achzib, Maresha)	Khirbat el-‘Atar	
פרה	(h)prh	Parah, Ha-Pharah	H6511	Joshua 18:23	1	Benjamin (group A; important cities: Bethel, Jericho)	? Khirbet 'Ēn Fāra; Khirbet Abū Musarraḥ	
צדים, הצדים	(h)ṣdym	Ziddim, Ha-Ziddim	H6661	Joshua 19:35	1	Naphtali (a fortified city)		
צידון, צידון רבה	ṣydwn (rbh)	Sidon (the great)	H6721 (+ H7227)	Joshua 11:8; 19:28	21 [37]	Asher (north-western border)	Saint Louis Castle area at Sidon 33°33′38″N 35°22′14″E	
צידנים	ṣydnym	Sidonians	H6722	Joshua 13:4.6	16	Asher	see Sidon (H6721)	Inhabitants of Sidon (H6721)
ציער	ṣyʿr	Zior	H6730	Joshua 15:54	1	Judah (important cities: Hebron)		
צלע	ṣlʿ	Zelah	H6762	Joshua 18:28	2	Benjamin (group B; important cities: Gibeon, Ramah, Mizpeh, Jerusalem)		
צמרים	ṣmrym	Zemaraim	H6787	Joshua 18:22	1	Benjamin (group A; important cities: Bethel, Jericho)	? Ras et-Tahuneh; er-Rammun	
צנן	ṣnn	Zenan	H6799	Joshua 15:37	1	Judah (important cities: Lachish, Eglon, Makkedah)	Khirbet Summeily	
צעננים	ṣʿnnym	Zaanannim	H6815	Joshua 19:33	2	Naphtali	Ḫirbet ‘Arbīṯa	
צפון	ṣpwn	Zaphon	H6829	Joshua 13:27	1	Gad (east of Jordan)	? Tell el-Qōs	
צקלג	ṣqlg	Ziklag	H6860	Joshua 15:31; 19:5	15	Simeon within Judah (southwestern territory bordering Edom; group A, important cities: Beersheba, Hormah, Ziklag)	? Tell esh-Shari'ah, Tell Sera' 31°23′26″N 34°40′40″E; Tell el-Hesi 31°32′51″N 34°43′49″E; Tell el-Khuweilifeh, Tel Halif 31°22′59″N 34°51′58″E; Tell 'Areini (near Kiryat Gat) 31°36′42″N 34°47′07″E; Tell en-Nejileh, Tel Nagila (between Ahuzam and Beit Kama) 31°30′08″N 34°45′28″E; Khirbet Meshash, Tel Masos 31°12′47″N 34°58′00″E; Tell es-Seba (near Beersheba) 31°14′41″N 34°50′27″E; Khirbet Zuheilikah/Zuheiliqah 31°25′51″N 34°37′59″E?	
צר	ṣr	Zer, Tyre [of Naphtali]	H6863	Joshua 19:35	1	Naphtali (a fortified city)		
צר	ṣr	Tyre [of Asher]	H6865	Joshua 19:29	42	Asher (eastern border)	Tyre 33°16′15″N 35°11′40″E	
צרעה	ṣrʿh	Zoreah, Zorah	H6881	Joshua 15:33; 19:41	10	Judah ("in the valley"; important cities: Eshtaol, Zoreah, Engannim, Tappuah, Jarmuth, Adullam, Socoh 1, Azekah); Dan (border city between Dan and Judah?)	? Tel Tzora/ Tzar'a/ Tsar'a, (Tell) Sar'a 31°46′31″N 34°59′08″E	
צרת השחר	ṣrt (h)šḥr	Zareth-Shahar, Zareth-Ha-Shahar	H6890	Joshua 13:19	1	Reuben (east of Jordan)	Boz al-Mushelle	
צרתן	ṣrtn	Zaretan	H6891	Joshua 3:16	3	? (Located by the Jordan river, near Adam, far from Jericho)	? el-Makhruq	
קבצאל	qbṣʾl	Kabzeel	H6909	Joshua 15:21	3	Judah (southwestern territory bordering Edom; group A, important cities: Beersheba, Hormah, Ziklag)		
קבצים	qbṣym	Kibzaim	H6911	Joshua 21:22	1	Ephraim (a levitical city)	? Tell el-Mazar; Tell es-Simadi 32°08′39″N 35°29′36″E; Tell esh-Sheikh Dhiab	
קדמת	qdmt	Kedemoth	H6932	Joshua 13:18; 21:37	4	Reuben (east of Jordan; a levitical city)	es-Saliyeh	
קדש	qdš	Kedesh [of Judah]	H6943	Joshua 15:23	1?	Judah (southwestern territory bordering Edom; group A, important cities: Beersheba, Hormah, Ziklag)		= Kedesh Barnea (H6947) ?
קדש	qdš	Kedesh [of Naphtali]	H6943	Joshua 12:22; 19:37; 20:7; 21:32	11?	Naphtali (a fortified city; in Galilee; a city of refuge; a levitical city)	? Tell Qadas/ Qades (near Ramot Naftali) 33°06′36″N 35°31′51″E; Khirbet el-Kidish/ Qedish/ Qadish (near Poria Illit) 32°44′03″N 35°33′17″E; some passages might refer to Tell Abu Qudeis 32°33′34″N 35°12′59″E	
קדש ברנע	qdš brnʿ	Kadesh Barnea	H6947	Joshua 10:41; 14:6.7; 15:3	10	Judah (southern border)	? Tell el-Qudeirat 30°38′53″N 34°25′21″E; 'Ain el-Qudeirat 30°38′33″N 34°24′49″E; 'Ain Qadeis/Kadeis 30°35′03″N 34°29′09″E; 'Ain al-Qusaima/Quseima 30°40′00″N 34°22′00″E; El Muweilah 30°41′09″N 34°19′12″E; formerly identified with Petra	= Kedesh [of Judah] (H6943) ?
קטח	qṭḥ	Kattath	H7005	Joshua 19:15	1	Zebulun		
קין	(h)qyn	Cain, Ha-Cain	H7014	Joshua 15:57	1	Judah (important cities: Gibeah, Timnah)	Ḫirbet Yūqīn	
קינה	qynh	Kinah	H7016	Joshua 15:22	1	Judah (southwestern territory bordering Edom; group A, important cities: Beersheba, Hormah, Ziklag)		
קנה	qnh	Kanah	H7071	Joshua 19:28	1	Asher (northern border?)	Qana 33°12′33″N 35°17′57″E	
קעילה	qʿylh	Keilah	H7084	Joshua 15:44	17	Judah (important cities: Libnah, Keilah, Achzib, Maresha)	Khirbet Qila (at Qila) 31°36′50″N 35°00′10″E	
קציץ, עמק קציץ	qṣyṣ, ʿmq qṣyṣ	Keziz, Emek-Keziz	H7104, H6010+H7104	Joshua 18:21	1	Benjamin (group A; important cities: Bethel, Jericho)	? Khirbet el-Marjameh 31°59′29″N 35°19′57″E	
קריות	qrywt (qrywt ḥṣrwn ?)	Kerioth (Kerioth-Hezron?)	H7152	Joshua 15:25	1	Judah (southwestern territory bordering Edom; group A, important cities: Beersheba, Hormah, Ziklag)		= Hezron (H2696) ?
קריתארבע	qrytʾrbʿ	Kirjath-Arba	H7153	Joshua 14:15; 15:13.54; 20:7; 21:11	9	Judah (important cities: Hebron; a city of refuge; a levitical city for Kohathites)	see Hebron (H2275)	= Hebron (H2275)
קריתבעל	qrytbʿl	Kiriath-Baal	H7154	Joshua 15:60; 18:14	2	Judah (important cities: Kiriath-Jearim; border between Judah and Benjamin - south-western corner of Benjamin's territory)	see Kiriath-Jearim (H7157)	= Kiriath-Jearim (H7157)
קריתים	qrytym	Kirjathaim	H7156	Joshua 13:19	6	Reuben (east of Jordan)	? Khirbat al-Qureijat 31°31′54″N 35°52′49″E?; Khirbat al-Qureiyeh 31°42′55″N 35°40′30″E?; Qaryat al-Mekhaiyet, Khirbat Mukhayyat 31°44′56″N 35°44′37″E; Qrajet el-Waran	
קרית	qryt	Kirjath	H7157	Joshua 18:28	1	Benjamin (group B; important cities: Gibeon, Ramah, Mizpeh, Jerusalem)		= Kiriath-Jearim (H7157, Judah's) ?
קריתיערים	qrytyʿrym	Kiriath-Jearim	H7157	Joshua 9:17; 15:9.60; 18:14-15; [18:28?]	19	Judah, Benjamin? (important cities: Kiriath-Jearim; border between Judah and Benjamin - south-western corner of Benjamin's territory; a city of Gibeonites alongside Gibeon, Chephirah and Beeroth)	? Deir el Azar 31°48′39″N 35°05′59″E	= Kiriath-Baal (H7154), = Baalah [of Judah 1] (H1173), = Kirjath (H7157) ?
קריתספר	qrytspr	Kirjath-Sepher	H7158	Joshua 15:15-16	4	Judah ("in the mountains"; important cities: Debir, Goshen)	see Debir [of Judah 1] (H1688)	= Debir [of Judah 1] (H1688)
קריתסנה	qrytsnh	Kirjath-Sannah	H7158	Joshua 15:49	1	Judah ("in the mountains"; important cities: Debir, Goshen)	see Debir [of Judah 1] (H1688)	= Debir [of Judah 1] (H1688)
קרקעה, הקרקעה	(h)qrqʿh	Karkaa, Ha-Karkaa	H7173	Joshua 15:3	1	Judah (southern border; to the east of Adar, Hezron and Kadesh-Barnea)		
קרתה	qrth	Kartah	H7177	Joshua 21:34	1	Zebulun (a levitical city)	see Chisloth-Tabor (H3696)	= Chisloth-Tabor (H3696)
קרתן	qrtn	Kartan	H7178	Joshua 21:32	1	Naphtali (a levitical city)	? Khirbet el-Qanitriyeh (Tel Raqqat); Khirbet el-Qureiyeh	
קשיון	qšywn	Kishion	H7191	Joshua 19:20; 21:28	2	Issachar (a levitical city)	Tell Qasyun	
ראמת	rʾmt	Ramoth	H7216	Joshua 20:8; [21:38]	4	Gad (in Gilead; a city of refuge; a levitical city)	see Ramoth Gilead (H7433)	= Ramoth (H7433)
רבה	(h)rbh	Rabbah, Ha-Rabbah [of Judah]	H7237	Joshua 15:60	1	Judah (important cities: Kiriath-Jearim)		
רבה	rbh	Rabbah, Rabbah [of Ammonites]	H7237	Joshua 13:25	14	Ammonites	Jabal al-Qal'a (in Amman) 31°57′17″N 35°56′03″E	
רבית, הרבית	(h)rbyt	Rabbith, Ha-Rabbith	H7245	Joshua 19:20	1	Issachar		
רחב	rḥb	Rehob [of Asher 1]	H7340	Joshua 19:28; (21:31?)	6 or 1	Asher (northern border?; a levitical city?)	? Tell al-Balat 33°06′53″N 35°17′26″E; Khirbat al-ʿAmri 33°03′59″N 35°08′18″E?; Tel Rosh 32°02′28.6″N 35°19′57.9″E; Tell Rahib; formerly identified with Hunin	
רחב	rḥb	Rehob [of Asher 2]	H7340	Joshua 19:30; (21:31?)	1?	Asher (south-eastern coastal territory of Asher; a levitical city?)	? Tell Bir al-Gharbi, Tel Bira 32°54′04″N 35°10′09″E	
ראמת	rʾmt	Ramath, Ramath-Negev	H7414	Joshua 19:8	1?	Simeon (within Judah?, in the Negev?)		
רמה, הרמה	(h)rmh	Ramah, Ha-Ramah [of Benjamin]	H7414	Joshua 18:25	33?	Benjamin (group B; important cities: Gibeon, Ramah, Mizpeh, Jerusalem)	? Al-Ram 31°51′13″N 35°14′00″E	
רמה, הרמה	(h)rmh	Ramah, Ha-Ramah [of Asher]	H7414	Joshua 19:29	1?	Asher (eastern border between Sidon and Tyre)	Rāmiye	
רמה, הרמה	(h)rmh	Ramah, Ha-Ramah [of Naphtali]	H7414	Joshua 19:36	1?	Naphtali (a fortified city)	? Ḫirbet Zētūn er-Rāme (in ar-Rame) 32°56′21″N 35°22′02″E	
רמון	rmwn	Rimmon, Remmon	H7417	Joshua 15:32; 19:7	8 or 4	Simeon within Judah (southwestern territory bordering Edom; group A, important cities: Beersheba, Hormah, Ziklag)	? Khirbet Umm er-Ramamin (Khirbet Raymond?) 31°22′19″N 34°51′55″E; Ain-Urtās/Artās?; Tel Halif 31.383062°N 34.866140°E	
רמון המתאר	rmwn (h)mtʾr	Rimmon-Methoar, Remmon-Ha-Methoar	H7417	Joshua 19:13	3	Zebulun (Zabulun's eastern? border)	? Ḫirbet er-Rūma; Rummanah 32°31′26″N 35°12′18″E; Tell el-Wawiyat	
רמת	rmt	Remeth	H7432	Joshua 19:21	1	Issachar		
רמת, רמת גלעד	rmt, rmt glʿd	Ramoth, Ramoth Gilead	H7433	Joshua [20:8;] 21:38	21	Gad (in Gilead; a city of refuge; a levitical city)	? Khirbat al Rumaythah, Tell er-Rumeit 32°29′59″N 36°00′53″E; Ar Ramtha32°33′32″N 36°0′53″E; Tell el-Husn	= Ramoth (H7216)
רמת המצפה	rmt (h)mṣph	Ramath-Mizpeh, Ramath-Ha-Mizpeh	H7434	Joshua 13:26	1	Gad (east of Jordan)	? Sūf; Tell el-Maṣfā	
הרקון	(h)rqwn	Rakkon, Ha-Rakkon	H7542	Joshua 19:46	1	Dan		
רקם	rqm	Rekem	H7552	Joshua 18:27	1	Benjamin (group B; important cities: Gibeon, Ramah, Mizpeh, Jerusalem)		
רקת	rqt	Rakkath	H7557	Joshua 19:35	1	Naphtali (a fortified city)		
שבמה	šbmh	Sibmah	H7643	Joshua 13:19	6	Reuben (east of Jordan)	? Umm el-Qanafid 31°50′N 35°50′E	
שבע	šbʿ	Sheba	H7652	Joshua 19:2	1	Simeon within Judah (listed alongside Moladah)		= Shema (H8090) ?
שברים, השברים	(h)šbrym	Shebarim, Ha-Shebarim	H7671	Joshua 7:5	1	Benjamin?, Judah? (not very far from Ai, probably to the east of Ai)		
שוכה	šwkh	Socoh [of Judah 1]	H7755	Joshua 15:35	6	Judah ("in the valley"; important cities: Eshtaol, Zoreah, Engannim, Tappuah, Jarmuth, Adullam, Socoh 1, Azekah)	? Khirbet esh-Shuwaikah/Shuweikeh + Khirbet 'Abbad 31°40′55″N 34°58′26″E; formerly identified with Tell Zakariya 31°42′02″N 34°56′10″E	
שוכה	šwkh	Socoh [of Judah 2]	H7755	Joshua 15:48	1	Judah ("in the mountains"; important cities: Debir, Goshen)	? Khirbet Shuweikeh 31°24′13″N 35°00′18″E	
שונם	šwnm	Shunem	H7766	Joshua 19:18	3	Issachar	Sulam	
שחצומה, שחצימה	šḥṣwmh, šḥṣymh	Shahazimah	H7831	Joshua 19:22	1	Issachar		
שטים, השטים	(h)šṭym	Shittim	H7851	Joshua 2:1; 3:1	5	? (a place on the east side of the Jordan river, not far from Jericho)	Tell el-Hammam 31.8402°N 35.6737°E	
שיאן	šyʾn	Shihon	H7866	Joshua 19:19	1	Issachar		
שיחור	šyḥwr	Sihor	H7883	Joshua 13:3	2	? (southern Canaan, "before the face of Egypt")	? Nahal Besor 31°27′50″N 34°22′33″E; a lake east of Qantara East and south-west of Pelusium	
שיחור לבנח	šyḥwr lbnḥ	Shihor-libnath	H7884	Joshua 19:26	1	Asher (not far from Carmel)	? Tell Abu Hawam 32°48′03″N 35°01′09″E; Khirbet Lebbuna	
שלה	šlh	Shiloh	H7887	Joshua 18:1.8-10; 19:51; 21:2; 22:9.12	32	? Ephraim?	Khirbet Seilun (near Shilo) 32°03′21″N 35°17′23″E	
שכם	škm	Shechem	H7927	Joshua 17:7; 20:7; 21:21; 24:1.25.32	49 or 48	Ephraim (not far from Michmethah, not far from the border between Ephraim and Manasseh?; a city of refuge; a levitical city; an Israelite meeting place at the end of Joshua's life)	Tell Balata (in Balata) 32°12′49″N 35°16′56″E	
שכרונה	škrwnh	Shicron	H7942	Joshua 15:11	1	Judah (northern border, west or north-west of Ekron, not far from mount Baalah)		
שלחים	šlḥym	Shilhim	H7978	Joshua 15:32	1	Judah (southwestern territory bordering Edom; group A, important cities: Beersheba, Hormah, Ziklag; listed between Lebaoth and Ain, Rimmon)		= Sharuhen (H8287, Simeon's) ?
שמיר	šmyr	Shamir	H8069	Joshua 15:48	3	Judah ("in the mountains"; important cities: Debir, Goshen)		
שמע	šmʿ	Shema	H8090	Joshua 15:26	1	Judah (southwestern territory bordering Edom; group A, important cities: Beersheba, Hormah, Ziklag; listed alongside Moladah)		= Sheba (H7652, Simeon's) ?
שמרון	šmrwn	Shimrom	H8110	Joshua 11:1; 19:15	2	Zebulun (not very far from Hazor, Madon and Achshaph)	Tel Shimron 32°42′13″N 35°12′50″E	= Shimron-Meron (H8112) ?
שמרון מראון	šmrwn mrʾwn	Shimron-Meron	H8112	Joshua 12:20	1	? (the king of this city was defeated by Joshua)		= Shimrom (H8110) ?
שעלבין	šʿlbyn	Shaalabbin	H8169	Joshua 19:42	3	Dan	kibbutz Sha'alavim, former village Salbit	
שורים	šʿrym	Shaaraim	H8189	Joshua 15:36	3 or 2	Judah ("in the valley"; important cities: Eshtaol, Zoreah, Engannim, Tappuah, Jarmuth, Adullam, Socoh 1, Azekah)	? Khirbet Qeiyafa	
שרוחן	šrwḥn	Sharuhen	H8287	Joshua 19:6	1	Simeon within Judah (listed between Beth-Lebaoth and Ain, Rimmon)		= Shilhim (H7978) ?
לשרון	lšrwn	Lasharon	H8289	Joshua 12:18	1?	? (the king of this city was defeated by Joshua)		
שריד	šryd	Sarid	H8301	Joshua 19:10.12	2	Zebulun (Zebulun's border - south-western? corner)	Tell Shadud just east of kibbutz Sarid 32°39′42″N 35°14′0″E	
תאנת שלה	tʾnt šlh	Taanath-Shiloh	H8387	Joshua 16:6	1	Ephraim (Ephraim's eastern border, between the upper Beth-Horon, Michmethah and Janohah, Jericho)	? Khirbet Tana el-Foqa; Khirbet Tana et-Tahta 32°09′09″N 35°23′44″E	
תבור	tbwr	Tabor	H8396	Joshua 19:22	1 to 4	Issachar	? Dabūrye	
תמנה	tmnh	Timnah	H8553	Joshua 15:10.57	11?	Judah (important cities: Gibeah, Timnah; northern border, between Beth-Shemesh and Ekron)	? Tell el-Batashi 31°47′05″N 34°54′40″E; formerly identified with Khirbet Tibneh 31°44′40″N 34°56′03″E?	= Thimnathah (H8553, Dan's) ?
תמנתה	tmnth	Thimnathah	H8553	Joshua 19:43	1	Dan		= Timnah (H8553, Judah's) ?
תמנתסרח	tmntsrḥ	Timnathserah	H8556	Joshua 19:50; 24:30	3	Ephraim (Joshua's inheritance; on the north of the hill of Gaash)	Khirbet Tibnah 32°00′30″N 35°06′40″E	
תענך	tʿnk	Taanach	H8590	Joshua 12:21; 17:11; 21:25	7	Manasseh (west of Jordan, among Issachar and Asher; a levitical city)	Tell Ta'annek/Tiinik 32°31′15″N 35°13′11″E	
תפוח	tpwḥ	Tappuah [of Judah]	H8599	Joshua (12:17?;) 15:34	2 or 1	Judah ("in the valley"; important cities: Eshtaol, Zoreah, Engannim, Tappuah, Jarmuth, Adullam, Socoh 1, Azekah)		
תפוח	tpwḥ	Tappuah [of Ephraim]	H8599	Joshua (12:17?;) 16:8; 17:8	4 or 3	Ephraim (northern border of Ephraim, located between Ephraim and Manasseh's territories)	Tell esh-Sheikh Abu-Zarad	= En-Tappuah (H5887) ?
תראלה	trʾlh	Taralah	H8634	Joshua 18:27	1	Benjamin (group B; important cities: Gibeon, Ramah, Mizpeh, Jerusalem)		
תרצה	trṣh	Tirzah	H8656	Joshua 12:24	14	? (a king of this city was defeated by Joshua)	? Tell el-Far'ah (North) 32°17′14″N 35°20′15″E	

== See also ==
- List of biblical places
- List of biblical names
- List of minor biblical places
- List of modern names for biblical place names
- Amarna letters–localities and their rulers
