= List of biblical places =

The locations, lands, and nations mentioned in the Bible are not all listed here. Some locations might appear twice, each time under a different name. Only places having their own Wikipedia articles are included. See also the list of minor biblical places for locations which do not have their own Wikipedia article.

== A ==
- Absalom's Monument
- Achaia
- Admah
- Ai
- Akko
- Akkad – Mesopotamian state
- Allammelech – within the Tribe of Asher land, described in the Book of Joshua.
- Allon Bachuth
- Alqosh, in the Nineveh Plains, mentioned in the Book of Nahum
- Ammon – Canaanite state
- Attalia – In Asia Minor
- Antioch – In Asia Minor
- Antipatris
- Arabia – (in biblical times and until the 7th century AD Arabia was confined to the Arabian Peninsula)
- Aram/Aramea – (Modern Syria)
- Arbela (Erbil/Irbil) – Assyrian city
- Archevite
- Armenia – Indo-European kingdom of eastern Asia Minor and southern Caucasus.
- Arrapḫa – Assyrian city, modern Kirkuk
- Ashdod
- Ashkelon
- Ashur/Asshur/Assur – capital city of Assyria
- Assyria – Mesopotamian Semitic state

== B ==
- Baal-hazor – Canaanite city
- Babel
- Babylon/Babylonia – Mesopotamian state
- Beer-Sheba
- Beirut
- Berea
- Beth-Anath
- Bethany
- Bethel
- Bethharan
- Bethlehem
- Beth-rehob
- Bethsaida
- Beth Shemesh in Judah (distinct from those in Naphtali and Issachar)
- Betshean
- Bochim
- Byblos – Phoenician state

== C ==
- Cabul
- Calah/Kalhu/Nimrud – Assyrian city
- Calneh – Assyrian city
- Cana – Galilee
- Canaan – Region on the Eastern shore of the Mediterranean
- Capernaum
- Cappadocia – Region in Asia Minor
- Carchemish – Assyrian city
- Caria – Nation in Asia Minor
- Cenchrea
- Chaldea – Mesopotamian state, eventually encompassing Babylonia
- Chezib of Judah
- Chorazin
- Cilicia – Nation in Asia Minor
- Crete, Greek island
- Commagene – Nation in Asia Minor
- Corduene – Nation in central Asia Minor, homeland of the Kurds
- Corinth, City in Greece
- Cush – African state
- Cyprus

== D ==
- Damascus
- Dan (formerly Laish)

== E ==
- Ebla – East Semitic state in northern Syria
- Edom –Ancient kingdom in Transjordan
- Egypt
- Ekron
- Elam – Pre-Iranic Nation in Ancient Iran
- Elim
- Emmaus
- En Gedi
- Ephesia/Ephesus – Greek city in Asia Minor
- Eridu – Mesopotamian city
- Eritrea- Erythraean Sea Ancient name for Red Sea and surrounding region
- Eshcol
- Eshnunna – Mesopotamian city state
- Esthaol
- Ethiopia

== G ==
- Gabatha (disambiguation) - several, listed by Eusebius together with Gaba, Giv'a etc.
- Gabbatha or Lithostrotos
- Galilee
- Garden of Eden
- Gath
- Gaul – modern France
- Gaza
- Georgia
- Gerar
- Gezer
- Gethsemane
- Gibeon
- Gilead
- Gilgal
- Golgotha
- Gomorrah
- Goshen
- Great Sea – Mediterranean Sea in the Bible
- Greece
- Gutium – state in Iran

== H ==
- Heaven
- Haran
- Harran – Assyrian City
- Hattusa – Capital of Hittite Empire in Asia Minor
- Hatti – Nation in Asia Minor
- Havilah
- Hazazon Tamar (also Hazazon-tamar or Hatzatzon-Tamar) – Ein Gedi
- Hebron
- Helam
- Hell
- Hill of Gash
- Hurri Nation – Nation in Asia Minor

== I ==
- Israel
- Imgur-Enlil – Assyrian City
- India – Esther 1:1

== J ==
- Jabbok
- Jaffa
- Jarmuth (Yarmut)
- Jeshanah
- Jerash (Gerasa)
- Jericho
- Jerusalem
- Jordan River
- Judah
- Judea
- Jubilee

== K ==
- Kabzeel
- Kadesh-Barnea
- Kaska – Nation in Asia Minor
- Kassite state – in Iran
- Keilah
- Kiriath-Jearim – City in Gibeon
- Kish – Mesopotamian City State
- Kush/Cush – in northeast Africa

== L ==
- Lachish
- Laish
- Laodicea
- Larsa – Mesopotamian city
- Lebanon
- Lehi
- Lycia – Nation in Asia Minor
- Lydia – Nation in Asia Minor
- Lystra

== M ==
- Machpela
- Macedonia
- Magan – Pre-Arab state in Oman
- Malta
- Mamre Plain
- Mannea – Nation in Iran
- Marah
- Mari – Assyrian city
- Mareshah
- Media – Nation in Iran
- Megiddo
- Meluhha – Pre-Arab state in the Arabian Peninsula
- Memphis
- Mesopotamia – Includes the kingdoms of Sumer, Akkad, Assyria, Babylonia, Chaldea, and the neo Assyrian states of Adiabene, Osroene and Hatra.
- Midian
- Moab – Cannanite state
- Mount Carmel
- Mount Ephraim
- Mount Hermon
- Mount Nebo
- Mount of Olives
- Mount Sinai
- Mount Tabor
- Mount Zemaraim
- Mount Zion
- Mysia – state in Asia Minor

== N ==
- Naarath
- Nahor
- Nahrain (Mesopotamia)
- Nazareth
- Nimrud – later name for the Assyrian city of Kalhu/Calah
- Nineveh – Capital of Assyria
- Nile – river in northeastern Africa
- Nod

== O ==
- Ono
- Ophir
- Opis – Mesopotamian/Babylonian City
- Osroene – Neo-Assyrian state

== P ==
- Palmyra – Aramean state in Syria
- Paran
- Parthia – Nation in Iran
- Penuel
- Perga – Town In Asia Minor
- Persia – Nation in Iran
- Petra
- Philistia – Original name of Palestine
- Phrygia – Nation in Asia Minor
- Phut
- Phoenicia
- Pithom
- Punt
- Puqudu, as "Pekod"
- Patmos

== R ==
- Ramathlehi
- Rapiqum – Assyrian City
- Rehoboth (Bible)
- Rephidim
- Roman Empire – Rome

== S ==
- Samaria – Nation of the Samaritans
- Sardis
- Scythia – Nation in Asia Minor
- Shalem
- Sheba – Pre-Arab state in Yemen
- Shechem
- Sheol
- Shiloh
- Shinar – Mesopotamian city
- Shomron
- Shubat-Enlil – Assyrian city
- Shur (Bible), also Sur (wilderness of ~, way of ~)
- Sidon
- Sin Desert
- Sinai
- Smyrna
- Sodom
- Spain – Romans 15.24
- Sumer/Sumeria – Mesopotamian state and region
- Syria/Aramea

== T ==
- Tabal – Georgian state in Asia Minor
- Tarshish
- Tarsus
- Tel Dan
- Teqoa
- Til-barsip – Assyrian city
- Timnath-serah
- Timnath
- Trachonitis
- Tushhan – Assyrian city
- Tyre

== U ==
- Ugarit – Amorite state
- Umma – Mesopotamian state and city
- Ur – Mesopotamian state and city
- Urartu – Hurrian state in the Caucasus
- Urkish – Mesopotamian state and city
- Uruk – Mesopotamian state and city
- The Land of Uz

== V ==
- Via Dolorosa

== X ==
- Xaloth – the biblical Chesulloth (now Iksal)

== Y ==
- Yarmut: see Jarmuth
- Yemen

== Z ==
- Zanoah
- Zelah, Judea
- Zelzah
- Zemaraim
- Zeredathah
- Zoara
- Zorah
- Zion
- Zobah

== See also ==
- List of archaeological sites in Israel and Palestine
- List of biblical names
- List of cities of the ancient Near East
- List of Hebrew place names
- List of modern names for biblical place names
- List of nations mentioned in the Bible
- Cities in the Book of Joshua
