= IIM (disambiguation) =

IIM (Indian Institutes of Management) is a group of 20 schools of management in India.

IIM may also refer to:

- IIM, a later name of the band Flans, and an album title
- Indian Institute of Metals, an Indian professional body
- Institution of Industrial Managers, a British professional body until 1992
- IPTC Information Interchange Model, a standard for embedding metadata in images

== See also ==
- Iim (biblical city)
- IIMS (disambiguation)
