= Jab'a =

Palestinian village in the West Bank

al-Jab'a الجبعة
- Local Development Committee

Arabic transcription(s)
  - Arabic: الجبعة
  - Latin: Jaba'a (official); Jab'aa (unofficial)
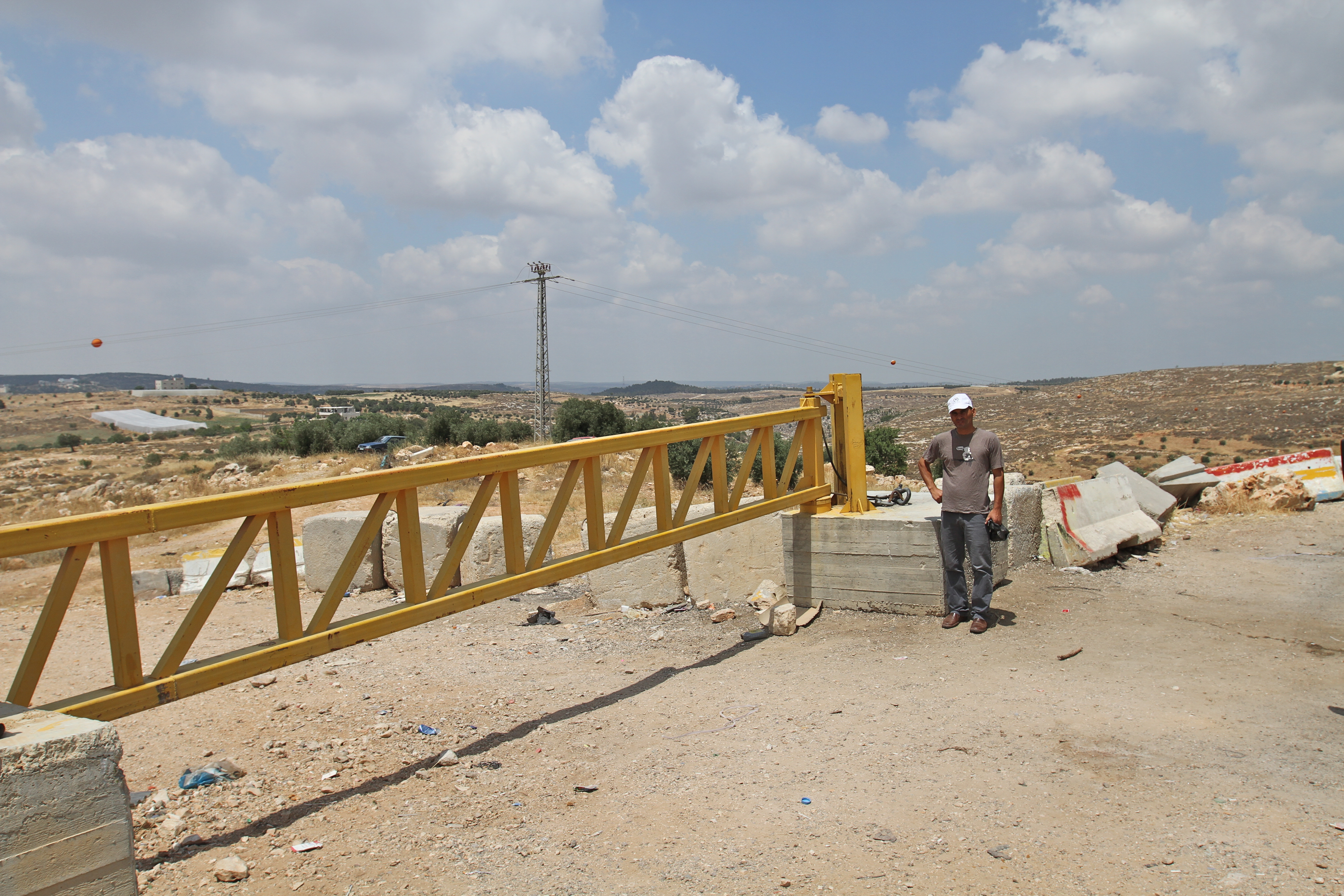
- Road block between Jab'a and neighbouring Surif, 2011

- Location of al-Jab'a within Palestine
- Coordinates: 31°40′29″N 35°04′40″E
- Palestine grid: 157/120
- State: State of Palestine
- Governorate: Bethlehem

Government
  - Type: Local Development Committee
  - Head of Municipality: No'man Hamdan

Area
  - Total: 10.1 km^{2} (3.9 sq mi)

Population (2017)
  - Total: 1,121
  - Density: 111/km^{2} (287/sq mi)
- Name meaning: "Hill"

Jab'a or al-Jab'a (Arabic: الجبعة) is a Palestinian village in the central West Bank, located 17 kilometers north of Hebron and 15 kilometers southwest of Bethlehem. Located three kilometers east of the Green Line, it is located in the Seam Zone, surrounded by the Israeli settlements in the Gush Etzion Regional Council and the Israeli West Bank barrier.

Nearby Palestinian towns and villages include Surif (adjacent to Jaba'a), Wadi Fukin and Nahalin to the north. It is the northernmost locality in the Hebron Governorate. According to the Palestinian Central Bureau of Statistics, Jab'a had a population of approximately 1,121 in 2017. Jab'a has a total land area of 10,099 dunams, of which 1,002 dunams as built-up area.

== History ==
=== Biblical connection; Byzantine period ===
Jab'a is mentioned in Eusebius' renowned work, Onomasticon, as Gabatha [Gava'ot] (Γαβαθα), believed by historical geographer, Samuel Klein to be Jab'a southeast of Bayt Nattif. Jab'a has been identified by Conder as the biblical site of Gibeah, mentioned in Joshua 15:57. Although not conclusive, it is said to be the burial-site of Habakuk the prophet. Elsewhere Eusebius purports that Habakuk was buried near a place called Ενκηλα (`Ain Qe'ilah), seven miles from Bayt Jibrin, and which place is now called Khirbet Qila.

Byzantine ceramics have been found here.

=== Ottoman period ===
Jab'a does not appear in records from the 16th century. Oral tradition suggests that it was founded in a later period.

In 1596, Jaba appeared in Ottoman tax registers as being in the Nahiya of Quds of the Liwa of Quds, with a population of 3 Muslim households. The villagers paid a fixed tax-rate of 33.3% on wheat, barley, olives, and goats or beehives; a total of 1,110 akçe.

Local tradition suggests Jab'a inhabitants came from Beit Suweir, founding the village following an assault on their previous settlement by the Ta'amreh tribe, an event that likely occurred in the 18th century.

In 1863, the French explorer Victor Guérin found Jab'a reduced to a hundred souls, while the Palestine Exploration Fund's Survey of Western Palestine described Jeba in 1883 as "a small village standing upon a high, narrow ridge, with a steep valley to the north. The houses are of stone. To the east are caves in the face of the rock."

=== British Mandate ===
In the 1922 census of Palestine conducted by the British Mandate authorities, Al Jaba'a had a population of 122 inhabitants, all Muslims, while at the time of the 1931 census, El Jab'a had a population of 176, still Muslim, living in a total of 36 houses.

In the 1945 statistics, El Jab'a counted a population of 210, all Muslims, who owned 5,593 dunams of land according to an official land and population survey. 102 dunams were plantations and irrigable land, 1,880 used for cereals, while 12 dunams were built-up (urban) land.

=== 1948 origin of the residents ===
According to a report by the Applied Research Institute–Jerusalem, the people of Jab'a village can trace their roots back to 1948 when they originally came from the villages of Rafat and Sajartah.

=== Jordanian rule ===
In the wake of the 1948 Arab–Israeli War, and after the 1949 Armistice Agreements, Jab’a came under Jordanian rule.

The Jordanian census of 1961 found 332 inhabitants.

=== 1967 and aftermath ===
Since the Six-Day War in 1967, Jab'a has been held under Israeli occupation.

After the 1995 accords, 3.5% of village land was classified as Area B land, while the remaining 96.5% was classified as Area C. Israel has put Jab'a inside the Gush Etzion block, effectively isolating it from its Palestinian neighbours. The Israeli West Bank barrier will extend on Al Jab’a lands, isolating 90% of Jab'a's land from the village.

On 25 February 2015, in an apparent price tag attack, a mosque in the village was torched. Israeli police were investigating it. The attack coincided with the anniversary of the Cave of the Patriarchs massacre that took place in Hebron 21 years ago. The fire was discovered by worshipers who quickly extinguished it. The carpets and walls were damaged but no one was reported to have been injured. Graffiti in Hebrew called for "revenge attacks" against Arabs and Muslims, according to eyewitnesses.

In October 2020, Israeli settlers destroyed 300 olive trees in the northern part of the village.

The village houses are small and consist of just one spacious room surrounded by a large area of farmland, on which almonds and olives and grapes are cultivated.

== Bibliography ==
- Barron, J.B., ed. (1923). Palestine: Report and General Abstracts of the Census of 1922. Government of Palestine.
- Conder, C.R.; Kitchener, H.H. (1883). The Survey of Western Palestine: Memoirs of the Topography, Orography, Hydrography, and Archaeology. Vol. 3. London: Committee of the Palestine Exploration Fund.
- Dauphin, C. (1998). La Palestine byzantine, Peuplement et Populations. BAR International Series 726 (in French). Vol. III : Catalogue. Oxford: Archeopress. ISBN 0-860549-05-4.
- Government of Jordan, Department of Statistics (1964). First Census of Population and Housing. Volume I: Final Tables; General Characteristics of the Population (PDF).
- Government of Palestine, Department of Statistics (1945). Village Statistics, April, 1945.
- Guérin, V. (1869). Description Géographique Historique et Archéologique de la Palestine (in French). Vol. 1: Judee, pt. 3. Paris: L'Imprimerie Nationale.
- Hadawi, S. (1970). Village Statistics of 1945: A Classification of Land and Area ownership in Palestine. Palestine Liberation Organization Research Center.
- Hütteroth, W.-D.; Abdulfattah, K. (1977). Historical Geography of Palestine, Transjordan and Southern Syria in the Late 16th Century. Erlanger Geographische Arbeiten, Sonderband 5. Erlangen, Germany: Vorstand der Fränkischen Geographischen Gesellschaft. ISBN 3-920405-41-2.
- Mills, E., ed. (1932). Census of Palestine 1931. Population of Villages, Towns and Administrative Areas. Jerusalem: Government of Palestine.
- Palmer, E.H. (1881). The Survey of Western Palestine: Arabic and English Name Lists Collected During the Survey by Lieutenants Conder and Kitchener, R. E. Transliterated and Explained by E.H. Palmer. Committee of the Palestine Exploration Fund.
- Tristram, H.B. (1897). Bible Places: or, The Topography of the Holy Land: a Succinct Account of All the Places, Rivers, and Mountains, etc. London.
