= Religion and geography =

Religion and geography is the study of the impact of geography, i.e. place and space, on religious belief.

Another aspect of the relationship between religion and geography is religious geography, in which geographical ideas are influenced by religion, such as early map-making, and the biblical geography that developed in the 16th century to identify places from the Bible.

== Research traditions ==
Traditionally, the relationship between geography and religion can clearly be seen by the influences of religion in shaping cosmological understandings of the world. From the 16th and 17th centuries, the study of geography and religion mainly focused on mapping the spread of Christianity (ecclesiastical geography), though in the latter half of the 17th century, the influences and spread of other religions were also taken into account.

Other traditional approaches to the study of the relationship between geography and religion involved the theological explorations of the workings of nature – a highly environmentally deterministic approach which identified the role of geographical environments in determining the nature and evolution of different religious traditions.

Thus, geographers are less concerned about religion per se, but are more sensitive to how religion as a cultural feature affects social, cultural, political and environmental systems. The point of focus is not the specifics of religious beliefs and practices, but how these religious beliefs and practices are internalised by adherents, and how these processes of internalisation influence, and are influenced by, social systems.

== Sacred places ==
Traditional cultural geographical approaches to the study of religion mainly seek to determine religion's impact on the landscape. A more contemporary approach to the study of the intersections of geography and religion not only highlights the role of religion in affecting landscape changes and in assigning sacred meanings to specific places, but also acknowledges how in turn, religious ideology and practice at specific spaces are guided and transformed by their location.

Religious experiences and the belief in religious meanings transform physical spaces into sacred spaces. These perceptions and imaginings influence the way such spaces are used, and the personal, spiritual meanings developed in using such sacred spaces. These religiously significant spaces go beyond officially religious/spiritual spaces (such as places of worship) to include non-official religious spaces such as homes, schools and even bodies. These works have focused on both material aspects of spaces (such as architectural distinctiveness) and socially constructed spaces (such as rituals and demarcation of sacred spaces) to present religious meaning and significance.

A key focus in the study of sacred places is the politics of identity, belonging and meaning that are ascribed to sacred sites, and the constant negotiations for power and legitimacy. Particularly in multicultural settings, the contestation for legitimacy, public approval, and negotiations for use of particular spaces are at the heart of determining how communities understand, internalise and struggle to compete for the right to practice their religious traditions in public spaces.

== Community and identity ==
Religion may be a starting point to examine issues of ethnic identity formation and the construction of ethnic identity Geographers studying the negotiations of religious identity within various communities are often concerned with the overt articulation of religious identity, for example, how adherents in different locations establish their distinctive (religious and cultural) identities through their own understandings of the religion, and how they externally present their religious adherence (in terms of religious practice, ritual and behaviour). As an overarching theme, the articulation of religious identity is concerned with material aspects of symbolizing religious identity (such as architecture and the establishment of a physical presence), with negotiations and struggles in asserting religious identity in the face of persecution and exclusion and with personal practices of religious ritual and behaviour that re-establish one's religious identity

== New geographies of religion ==
As research on geography and religion has grown, one of the new focuses of geographical research examines the rise of religious fundamentalism, and the resulting impact this has on the geographical contexts in which it develops.

In addition, migration processes have resulted in the development of religious pluralism in numerous countries, and the landscape changes that accompany the movement and settlement of communities defined by religion is a key focus in the study of geography and religion. More work needs to be done to examine the intersections and collisions that occur due to the movement of communities (for example, the migration of Muslim communities to western countries) and highlight how these communities negotiate their religious experiences in new spaces. Recent research in this area has been published by Barry A. Vann who analyzes Muslim population shifts in the Western world and the theological factors that play into these demographic trends.

Another new area of interest in the study of geography and religion explores different sites of religious practice beyond the ‘officially sacred’ – sites such as religious schools, media spaces, banking and financial practices (for example, Islamic banking) and home spaces are just some of the different avenues that take into account informal, everyday spaces that intersect with religious practice and meaning.

== Geopolitics ==
The geographical distinctiveness of religion has also been discussed by scholars in the past. Environmental determinists developed racial justifications for the relationship between regional habitats, climates, and religions around the beginning of the 20th century. Geographical approaches to religion in the past have subsequently studied the intersections between history, place, and religion, condemning and rejecting these studies' simplistic emphasis on the influence of the environment on cultural behaviors. Many have evaluated how regional differences in religious doctrine, practice, and theologies are influenced by local social, cultural, and political settings.

== See also ==
- Ethnic religion
- Religion by country
- Religious demographics
