= Jattir =

Town mentioned in the Bible

Horvat Yattir
- خربة عتّير (Arabic)
- Khirbet Attir
- Location within Israel
- 31°21′09″N 35°00′58″E
- Type: settlement
- Periods: Chalcolithic to Mamluk period
- Cultures: Byzantine
- Location: Southern District

Site notes
- Public access: Yes

Jattir (Hebrew יַתִּר, pronounced Yattir; Arabic: 'Attir عتّير) is a town in Judea mentioned several times in the Hebrew Bible. It was known as Iethira during the 4th century CE, when it was a Christian town. It is identified with Khirbet Attir, a depopulated Palestinian village and archeological site in the southern Hebron Hills, located in modern-day Israel.

== History ==
=== Hebrew Bible ===
Joshua 15:48 says that Jattir was in the mountains of Judah. The village was allocated by Joshua and Elazar to the kohanim of the Aaronic priesthood, according to (Joshua 21:14); Yatir, as written in the Hebrew Bible (Christian Old Testament): "And unto the children of Aaron the priest they gave Hebron with its suburbs, the city of refuge for the manslayer, and Libnah with its suburbs, and Yattir with its suburbs, and Eshtemoa with its suburbs" (Book of Joshua 21:13-14).

Some 400 years later, the Book of Kings mentions that King David shared a portion of the war booty from his battle with the Amalekites with the elders of Yattir (1 Samuel 30:27).

=== Onomasticon ===
In the early-4th century CE, Greek scholar Eusebius mentioned the town twice in his Onomasticon: "Ietheira is now a very large village in the interior of Daroma, situated near Malaatha", and later, "It is now the very large village of Ietheira, about twenty miles from Eleutheropolis, wholly Christian, in the inner Daroma, near Malatha."

=== Madaba Map ===
The town is depicted on the seventh-century Madaba Map.

=== Khirbet 'Attir (ʿAttir) ===
Khirbet 'Attir (Arabic: عتير), located about 5 km south of the town of as-Samuʿ in the Hebron Governorate, was a small Palestinian village that was depopulated during the 1948 Arab–Israeli War. In 1838, Edward Robinson and noted Attir as a ruin located southwest of el-Khulil.

The 1870s Survey of Western Palestine reported that Khurbet Attir contained “foundations, and heaps of stones,” together with “a great many caves, a ruined masonry tomb, and several fallen pillar-shafts and cisterns.” The surveyors also noted a kubbeh at the ruin and remains of a large building with four courses of walling still visible, as well as a large oil-press cut in the hillside below.

The site today lies within the internationally recognized boundaries of Israel. It was historically known for its fertile lands stretching towards the northern Negev.

=== 1948 and aftermath ===
The village lands were occupied during the 1948 war. Unlike many other depopulated villages, no Israeli settlement was immediately established on ʿAttir's land, although later development in the area included the forestation of pine and cypress groves. Following the construction of the Israeli separation barrier in the 2000s, the site became entirely isolated and access has since been restricted.

== Archeological site ==
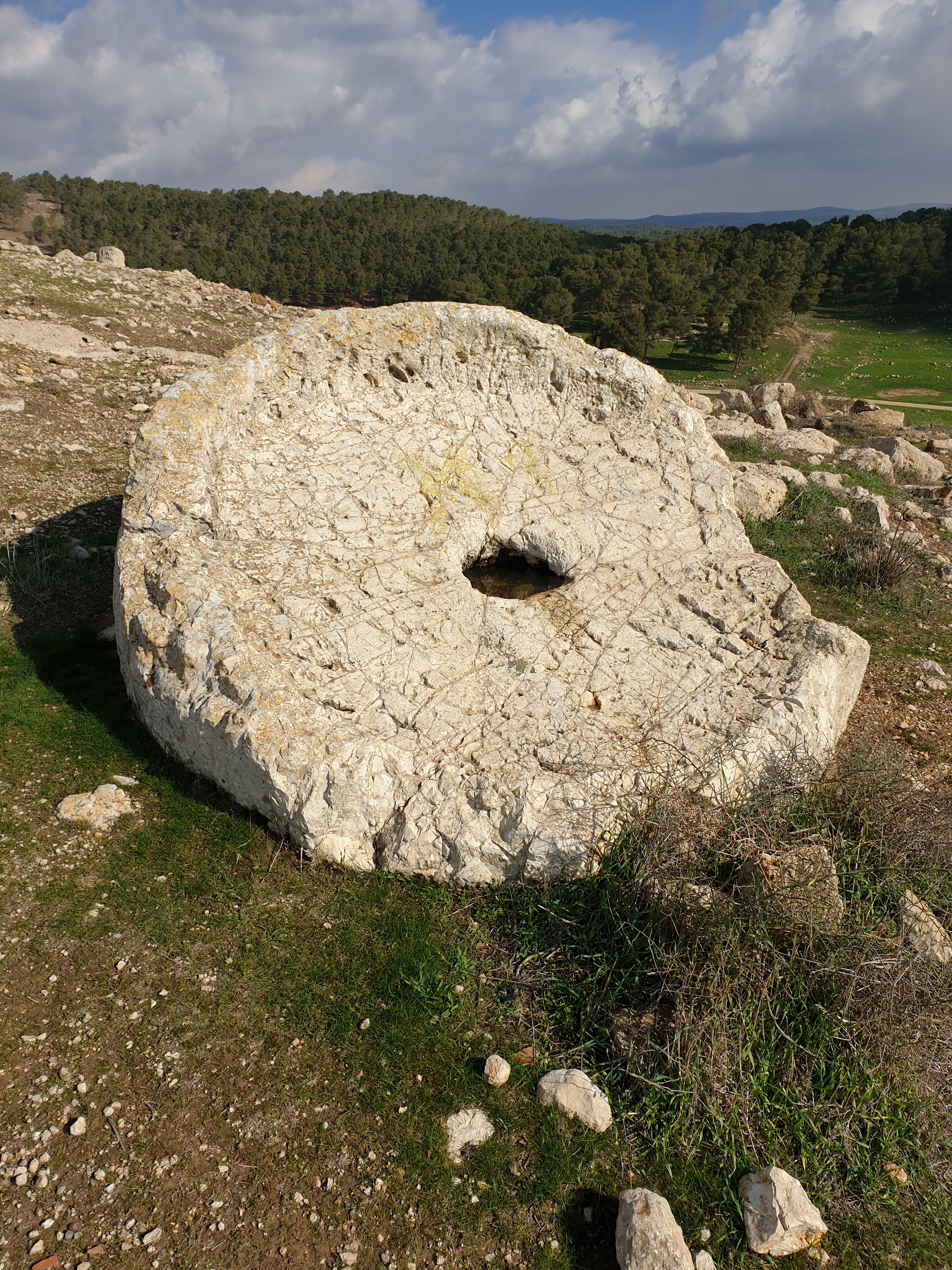
Oil press millstone on site

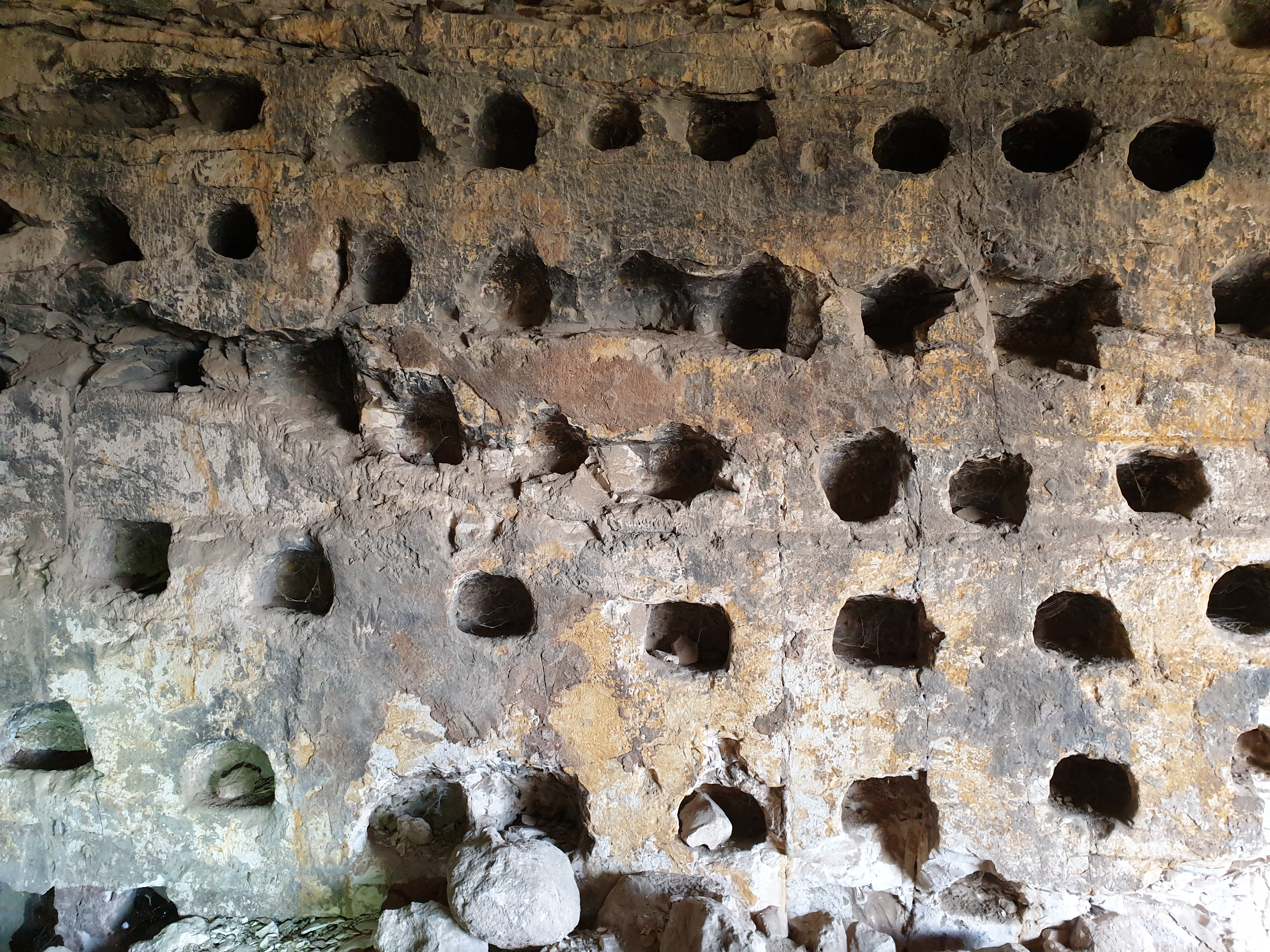
Columbarium wall at Jattir

Jattir was identified by Edward Robinson with Khirbet Attir (Horvat Yattir), southwest of Hebron in the West Bank. Félix-Marie Abel noted that there are visible Roman and Byzantine remnants at the site, including a church; moreover, he wrote that the site dominates its surroundings.

A series of excavations was conducted at the site between 1995 and 1999. It appears that the site have been occupied during the Chalcolithic period, the Early Bronze Age, the Iron Age (starting from the 7 century BCE), the Persian period, Hellenistic period, and up until the Mamluk period. Two Byzantine churches were excavated on the site. The settlement appears to have been destroyed at the end of the Bar Kokhba revolt.

== Other identifications ==
Victor Guérin thought that Jattir was identical with the village of Yater in Lebanon.

== See also ==
- Cities in the Book of Joshua

== Bibliography ==
- Conder, C.R.; Kitchener, H.H. (1881). The Survey of Western Palestine: Memoirs of the Topography, Orography, Hydrography, and Archaeology. Vol. 1. London: Committee of the Palestine Exploration Fund.
- Guérin, V. (1880). Description Géographique Historique et Archéologique de la Palestine (in French). Vol. 3: Galilee, pt. 2. Paris: L'Imprimerie Nationale.
- Robinson, E.; Smith, E. (1841). Biblical Researches in Palestine, Mount Sinai and Arabia Petraea: A Journal of Travels in the year 1838. Vol. 3. Boston: Crocker & Brewster.
