= Kartan =

Biblical city

Kartan was a double city, a town of Naphtali, assigned to the Gershonite Levites, and one of the Cities of Refuge (Joshua 21:32). It was probably near the north-western shore of the Sea of Tiberias, identical with the ruined village el-Katanah and Kirjathaim.
