= Kartah =

Kartah (Hebrew: קִרתָּה; Greek: Καρθάν) was a Levitical city in the territory of the tribe of Zebulun assigned, according to the Hebrew Bible, to the Levites of the family of Merari (Joshua 21:34). It is identical with Kattath (Joshua 19:15), and perhaps also with Kitron (Judges 1:30).

== See also ==
- Khirbat Qumbaza
