= Karkaa =

Coordinates: 30°57′30″N 34°22′49″E

Karkaa or Karka was a city or place mentioned in the Bible near Adar and Azmon, about midway between the Mediterranean Sea and the Dead Sea. The place is mentioned only once as one of the landmarks on the south boundary of the tribe of Judah and its present location is unknown.(Joshua 15:3).
