= Ezem =

Unidentified site in the Negev of Judah

Ezem (Hebrew: עצם, vars. ‛Atsem, 'Asam, Azem, 'Osem or Otzem, meaning strength, might, bone, to close, to defend, also self, self-same and strenuous) is an unidentified site in the Negev of Judah toward the Edomite border.

It is mentioned in the Biblical Book of Joshua (15:29; 19:1–3). In the King James Version it is spelled "Azem" in Joshua and "Ezem" in Chronicles (4:29).

In Joshua 19:1-3 and 1 Chronicles 4:29 it is one of the towns "in the midst of the inheritance of Judah" assigned to Simeon.

== See also ==
- Cities in the Book of Joshua
