= Kedemoth =

Kedemoth (Hebrew: קְדֵמוֹת) was a city of Reuben, assigned to the Levites of the family of Merari (Joshua 13:18). It lay not far north-east of Dibon-gad, east of the Dead Sea.
