= Moladah =

Moladah was a biblical town of Simeon in the Negeb near Beersheba.

== Biblical importance ==
Moladah has several mentions in the bible: Joshua 15:26, Joshua 19:2, 1 Chronicles 4:28 and Nehemiah 11:26. In Joshua, it is just allotting land for the Tribes of Israel. In 1 Chronicles, it is in a list of places of the descendants of Simeon. In Nehemiah, it is shown as being occupied by the returning Judahite exiles. It was later turned into an Idumean fortress.

== Current location ==
There have been, and are, many debates concerning the current location of Moladah. Tell el-Milḥ, southeast of Beersheba, has been regularly identified with Moladah, but this mound is now thought more likely Canaanite Arad. The more likely location is Khereibet el-Waṭen, east of Beersheba, which is possibly the Arab equivalent of the Hebrew name.

== See also ==
- Tribes of Israel
