= Shihor-libnath =

Town mentioned in the Old Testament

Shihor libnath (šîḥôr liḇnāṯ) is a town mentioned in the Hebrew Bible/Old Testament that marked the boundary of Asher's tribal inheritance (Joshua 19:26). Although the location of this town is unknown, the description in the Book of Joshua indicates that Shihor libnath marked Asher's western periphery in proximity to Mount Carmel.
