= Ebez =

M17 A2 Q3 Z4 U28 G1 N25
ꜣpjḏꜣꜣ
in hieroglyphs
Era: New Kingdom
(1550–1069 BC)

Ebez (Hebrew: אֶבֶץ meaning "tin", or "white") also rendered Abez, was a town in the allotment of the tribe of Issachar, at the north of the Jezreel Valley, or plain of Esdraelon. F. R. and C. R. Conder (1879), believed that it was probably the ruins of el-Beida, but William Robertson Smith (1899) expressed doubt about this identification. According to the 1915 International Standard Bible Encyclopedia (1915), the location is not known. It is mentioned only in Joshua 19:20, where various manuscripts of the Septuagint render it as Rebes (Ancient Greek: Ῥεβὲς), Aeme, or Aemis. It is mentioned on the façade of the Mortuary Temple of Ramesses III at Medinet Habu as Apijaa.
