= Cabbon =

Cabbon or Kabbon was named in the Bible as a place in Judah near Eglon. As of the early twentieth century, three possible locations of Cabbon were el-Kufeir, el-Kubeibeh, and Abu Kabûs. According to Steven Ortiz, its location is still unknown.
