= Jagur =

Jagur (Hebrew: יָגוּר) was a town in ancient Israel. Jagur was located in the southernmost district of Judah (Josh. 15:21). Jagur ('Ajjur) is located some 24 kilometers (15 mi) northwest of Hebron, and only a few kilometers southwest of Beit Shemesh. It falls under the jurisdiction of the Mateh Yehuda Regional Council.
