= Jehud =

Jehud, also pronounced Yehud, was a city in ancient Israel that is mentioned in the Hebrew Bible.

It was located in the district of the Tribe of Dan. It is commonly believed to have been located at the same place as the modern El Yehudiye or Yehud, about 13 km east of Jaffa. Some suggest that the place instead could have been located close to Yazur/Azor, southeast of Jaffa. This is believed to have been the place that is called Azuru by the Assyrian king Sennacherib.
