= Zareth-shahar =

Place mentioned in the Hebrew Bible

Zareth-shahar, Zereth-shahar, or Zereth Shahar is a place in the Hebrew Bible mentioned only once, in Joshua 13:19. It is identified as being "in the mount of the valley" (KJV), in a passage which delineates the borders of the tribe of Reuben apportioned by Moses (Joshua 13:15-23). Its name means "the splendor of the dawn." Its exact location is unknown.

It may be Zarat, near the mouth of the Wady Zerka Main, on the eastern shore of the Dead Sea, some 3 mi (4.8 km) south of the Callirrhoe, in the territory of the Tribe of Reuben. Little remains of this town. "A few broken basaltic columns and pieces of wall about 200 yards back from the shore, and a ruined fort rather nearer the sea, about the middle of the coast line of the plain, are all that are left" (Henry Baker Tristram's Land of Moab).
