= Keziz =

Keziz was a city of the tribe of Benjamin (Joshua 18:21).

Emek-keziz (Hebrew: עֵמֶק קְצִיץ, ʿEmeq Qeṣîṣ; KJV “the valley of Keziz”; Septuagint Αμεκασεις) mentioned only in Joshua 18:21, where it is listed after Jericho and Beth-hoglah among the tribe’s eastern towns between Jericho and the Dead Sea. Emek means “valley”, and keziz derives from a root meaning “to cut off”. Translations differ on whether the name denotes a town (ASV, RSV, NIV) or a valley (KJV). The site has not been identified; Albert Barnes suggested the Wadi el-Kaziz east of Jerusalem.
