= Neiel =

Place in Israel

Neiel (Hebrew: נְעִיאֵל) was a biblical town that was located in Israel. The word Neiel can mean either 'moved by God' or 'shaken by God'. It is mentioned in the Book of Joshua (19:27) as a town on the southern border of the tribe of Asher.
