= Secacah =

Secacah (Hebrew: סְכָכָה, səkākā) is a town mentioned in the Hebrew Bible/Old Testament as well as in the Dead Sea Scrolls. The town was located in the wilderness of Judah, otherwise known as the Judean Desert, and is identified by some scholars with the archaeological site of Khirbet Qumran.

== Ancient name ==
The toponym Secacah is derived from the root סכך, which means either “enclosed” or “cover” (possibly in reference to a shaded area). The variation in the spelling of the place name, סככה in the Hebrew Bible versus סככא in the Copper Scroll, reflects an orthographic phenomenon seen elsewhere in later phases of Hebrew (א < ה). In the Greek versions of the Hebrew Bible, Secacah is transcribed as Σοχοχα in LXX-A but is written Aιχιoζa in LXX-B. In the latter source (LXX-B), however, the place names of Joshua 15:61–62 seem to have been corrupted.

== References in Biblical and post-biblical sources ==
Secacah is mentioned in the Hebrew Bible, Joshua 15:61, as part of the Tribe of Judah's inheritance. The roster of towns in Joshua 15 is commonly thought to reflect an administrative document that originated during the Kingdom of Judah. This list divides the Iron Age kingdom into four regions, the Shephelah, the Negeb, the wilderness, and the highlands; Secacah is listed in the wilderness along with the City of Salt and the better known town of En-gedi. Although Secacah is only listed once in the Hebrew Bible, it is mentioned several times in the Copper Scroll, 3Q15 4-5, in reference to the hiding places of the treasures mentioned in this document. The description of Secacah includes a dam and an aqueduct (3Q15 4:13 and 5:1-3) and associates the place with Jericho (3Q15 5:13).

== Location and identification ==
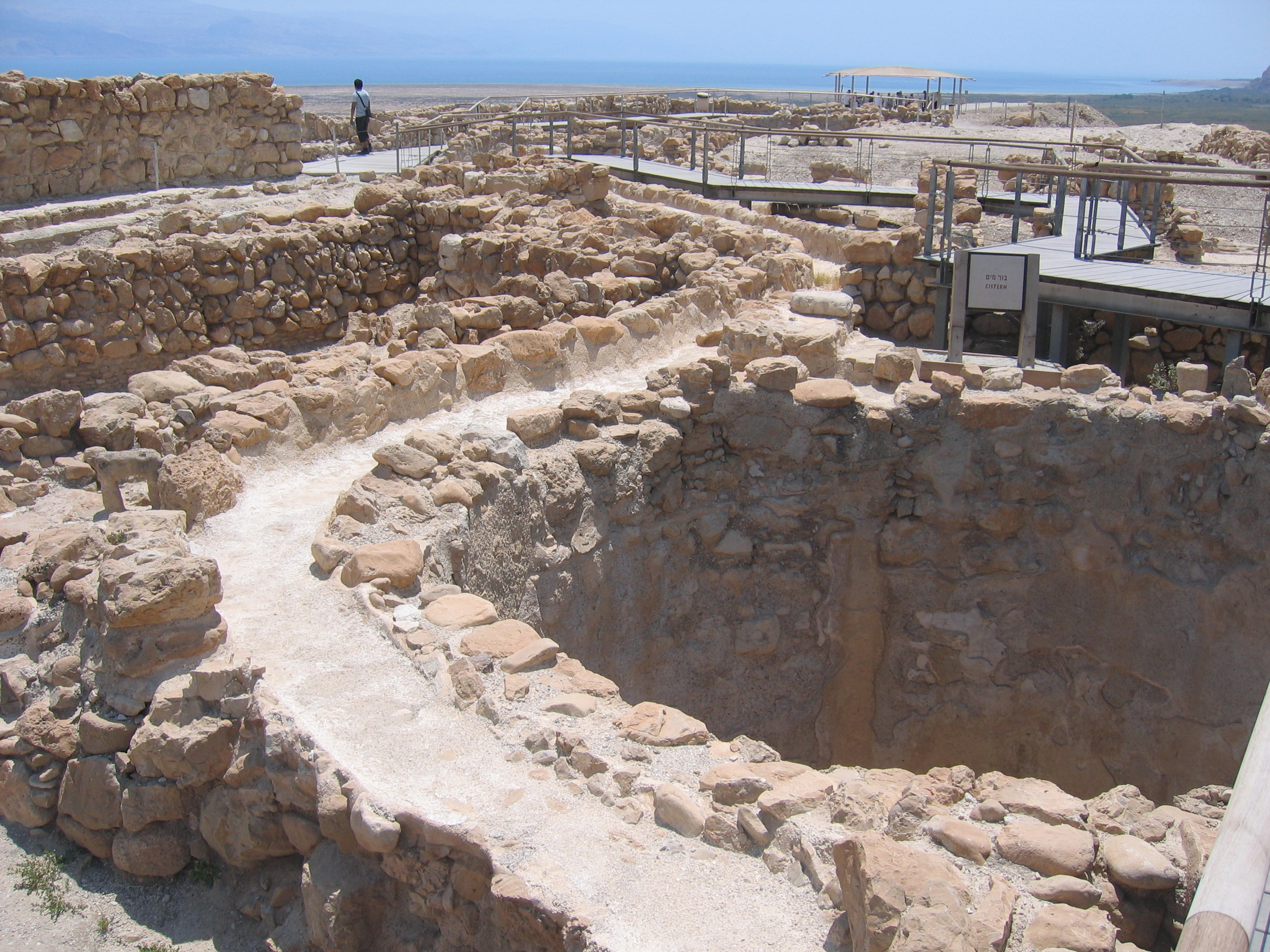
The water system at Qumran.

The town of Secacah is listed along with six other towns and related settlements in the wilderness of Judah, situated along the western bank of the Dead Sea and commonly known as the Judean Desert. Frank Moore Cross Jr. and Józef Milik located Secacah at the archaeological site of Khirbet es-Samrah in the Buqê’ah, a valley in the Judean Desert. The basis for this identification was that es-Samrah was an Iron Age settlement that was in the same area as Secacah (the wilderness of Judah). John Marco Allegro, however, identified Khirbet Qumran (nearby the Buqê’ah) with Secacah. Although it is most famous as the archaeological site where the Dead Sea Scrolls were discovered, excavations have revealed that Qumran was initially inhabited during the Iron Age. The Iron Age remains found there include a LMLK seal (similar to the one found by Cross and Milik at es-Samrah). In addition, the water system at Qumran, which dates to the early Roman Period, is consistent with the description of Secacah in the Copper Scroll.
