= Dabbasheth =

Dabbasheth was a town on the border of Zebulun; in the Greek translation Septuagint, its name is translated as Βαιθάραβα (Baitharava). Conder has identified this town as synonymous with Dabsheh, the ruins of which are found east of Acco near the hills.
