= Esthaol (Bible) =

Esthaol or Eshtaol, in Hebrew: אֶשְׁתָּאֹל (Eshṭa'ol), in Ancient Greek: Εσθαολ (Esthaol), is a town mentioned in the Bible. It corresponds to a locality near Sar'a, approximately 20 km west of Jerusalem.

== History ==
=== Biblical text ===
The place is mentioned seven times in the Masoretic text. In the manuscripts of the Septuagint, there are sometimes competing forms, such as Ασταωλ (Astaol). According to the biblical text, Samson is said to come from its vicinity. Additionally, part of the tribe of Dan is said to have left this town to settle elsewhere.

=== Analysis ===
The etymology of the term suggests that it may have been a place for consulting oracles, although this is not clear. The locality was situated in the vicinity of the later city of Zorah/Sar'a.
