= IIMS =

IIMS may stand for:

- Indian Institutes of Management (IIMs)
  - Indian Institute of Management Sambalpur (IIM-S)
  - Indian Institute of Management Shillong (IIM-S)
  - Indian Institute of Management Sirmaur (IIM-S)
- Indonesia International Motor Show

== See also ==
- Buzzard IIMS, a variant of the Rolls-Royce Buzzard engine
