= Kirjathaim =

Kirjathaim (Greek: Κιριαθαίμ), meaning in Hebrew "town" or "city".

Kirjathaim may refer to:

1. A city of refuge in Naphtali (1 Chronicles 6:76).
2. A town on the east of Jordan (Genesis 14:5; Deuteronomy 2:9–10). It was assigned to the tribe of Reuben (Numbers 32:37). In the time of (Ezekiel 25:9) it was one of the four cities which formed the "glory of Moab" (Compare Jeremiah 48:1,23). It has been identified with el-Kureiyat, 11 miles south-west of Medeba, on the south slope of Jebel Attarus, the ancient Ataroth.
