= Kattath =

Kattath - (Joshua 19:15), a town of Zebulun, has been identified with Kana el Jelil or Kithron. (See Cana)
