= Gabatha =

Gabatha and Gabathōn are the graecised forms of Semitic (Aramaic, Hebrew) words for 'hill' or 'elevation', used as toponyms or parts thereof in the Hellenised Land of Israel/Palestine region and found as such in the Onomasticon written by Eusebius of Caesarea in the 4th century.

Gabatha may also refer to:

- Gabatha, the Greek (Septuagint) name for Bigthan, a figure from the Book of Esther
- Gabbatha or Lithostrōtos, place of Jesus' trial by Pilate
- Geba (city), in Benjamin
- Giv'at, Giv'a, Hebrew for 'hill': part of biblical and modern Israeli toponyms
- Gibeon (ancient city), Canaanite, then of Benjamin, then Levitical
