= Beth Shemesh =

Beth Shemesh (House of the Sun) is the name of three places in the Land of Israel and one location in Ancient Egypt mentioned in the Hebrew Bible:

- a city in southwest Judah, remains excavated next to modern Beit Shemesh – see Tel Beit Shemesh
- a city in northern Israel allocated to the Tribe of Naphtali
- a city allocated to the tribe of Issachar (Joshua 19:22) – possibly `Ain esh-Shemsîyeh
- On-Heliopolis, in Egypt, mentioned in Jeremiah 43:13
