= Iim (biblical city) =

City in southern Judah

Iim, Iyim, or I'im (i'im; "heaps, ruins") was a city in the extreme South of Judah (Josh 15:29), and doubtless included within the territory of Simeon, as the associated places were (cf. 19:3). It is probably to be identified with the ruins of Deir el-Ghawi, near Ummin Deimneh.

== See also ==
- Iye-abarim; Iyim.
