= Azmon =

Biblical site in the Land of Israel

Azmon (Hebrew: עצמן or עצמון; ‛atsmôn) is a Biblical site in the Land of Israel marking the western portion of the southern frontier of the Kingdom of Judah before the point where "it went out at the Brook of Egypt".

== History ==
Azmon is mentioned in the Hebrew Bible books of Numbers (34:4–5) and Joshua (15:4). According to a researcher of Bedouin culture, biblical Azmon was an oasis known to Arabic-speaking Bedouin as Gusayma, named for the gaysum plant (Achillea fragrantissima) which grows abundantly in the region. It appears on the 6th-century Byzantine Madaba Map as Asemona (Ancient Greek: Αςεμωνα).
