= Naarath =

Biblical place

Naarath is a place named in Joshua 16:7 as one of the landmarks on the southern boundary of the Tribe of Ephraim and Benjamin. It appears to have been situated between Ataroth and Jericho. During the 4th-century, Eusebius and Jerome speak of "Naorath", as a "small village of Jews fives miles from Jericho."

== Sources ==
- Biblical Proportions
- Easton's Bible Dictionary
- New International Version Bible
