= List of minor biblical places =

This is a list of places mentioned in the Bible, which do not have their own Wikipedia articles. See also the list of biblical places for locations which do have their own article.

== A ==
=== Abana ===
Abana, according to 2 Kings 5:12, was one of the "rivers of Damascus", along with the Pharpar river.

=== Abdon ===
Abdon was a Levitical city in Asher allocated to the Gershonites according to Joshua 21:30 and 1 Chronicles 6:74.

=== Abel-Shittim ===
Abel-Shittim, the last Israelite encampment before crossing into the Promised Land, is identified by Josephus with Abila in Peraea, probably the site of modern Tell el-Hammam in Jordan.

=== Adam ===
Adam was a location which, according to Joshua 3:16, was along the Jordan River, near Zarethan. According to Cheyne and Black, it may be a scribal error for "Adamah".

=== Adadah ===
Adadah is the name of a town mentioned in Joshua 15:22, in a list of towns inside the territory of the Tribe of Judah. The name "Adadah" appears nowhere else in the Bible. Adadah is Hadad or Haddad spelled backwards. According to the Encyclopaedia Biblica, the name "Adadah" may be a miswritten version of Ararah, a name equivalent to "Aroer".

=== Addan ===
Addan or Addon is a Babylonian location mentioned in Ezra 2:59 and Nehemiah 7:61.

=== Adithaim ===
Adithaim, mentioned only in Joshua 15:36, is listed among locations belonging to Judah in the Shephelah.

=== Adria ===
Adria, mentioned in Acts 27:27, is a term used for "the division of the Mediterranean which lies between Sicily and Malta on the West and Crete on the East".

=== Aesora ===
Aesora (or Esora) is a location mentioned only in Judith 4:4. The Book of Judith is considered canonical by the Catholic and Orthodox churches, but not by Jews and most Protestants.

The Septuagint calls the place Aisora, Arasousia, Aisoraa, or Assaron, depending on the manuscript. The Book of Judith places it between Choba and the Valley of Salem. According to Cheyne and Black (1899), the exact location is uncertain. It could be the same as Tel Hazor, which is mentioned in the Book of Joshua; or at an As[h]er-Michmethath (Joshua 16:6) which Blessed Anne Catherine Emmerich and the Bordeaux Pilgrim place at modern Tayasir.

=== Aetan ===
Aetan appears in the Septuagint version of the Book of Joshua.

=== Ahava ===
Ahava is the name of a canal or river mentioned in the Book of Ezra, where Ezra and the latter group of returning exiles assembled before travelling to Jerusalem. Its location is unknown. The equivalent text in the Greek 1 Esdras refers to "the river Theras".

Albert Barnes says that it was both a town and a river.

=== Almon ===
Almon is a location mentioned in Joshua 21:18 given to the Kohathites, and thought to be near the modern Israeli settlement at Almon, Mateh Binyamin in the West Bank.

=== Amad ===
Amad is a biblical place-name mentioned only in Joshua 19:26. It appears in a list of locations that make up the borders of the territory assigned to the biblical Tribe of Asher.

=== Amam ===
Amam (Hebrew: אמם, 'amam) is an unidentified site in the Negeb of Judah, near the border with Edom, mentioned in Joshua 15:26.

=== Anaharath ===
Anaharath is described in Joshua 19:19 as a location on the border of the territory belonging to the Tribe of Issachar. It was most likely located at the site now known as Tel Rekhesh/Tell el-Mukharkhash in the Tabor Stream valley.

=== Arah of the Sidonians ===
Arah of the Sidonians is a place-name which appears in Joshua 13:4. Other translations render the name Mearah. The initial syllable me- here is commonly interpreted as a preposition, yielding the translation "from Arah" instead of "Mearah". The me- is also interpreted as "from" by Thomas Kelly Cheyne, although he additionally proposed that further scribal error had influenced the word.

=== Arumah ===
Arumah is a location mentioned in Judges 9:41, as the place where Gideon's son Abimelech lived for a time. The location is generally considered to be the same as the modern Jebel el-Urmah.

=== Ascent of Luhith ===
See Luhith.

=== Ashnah ===
Ashnah is the name given in Joshua 15 (verses 33 and 43) for two places in the Shephelah of Judah. For the first, the modern location Aslin has been proposed; for the second, Idna.

=== Ataroth-addar ===
Ataroth-addar is a location mentioned in Joshua 16:5. It may be the same location as the Ataroth mentioned in 16:2.

=== Aznoth-tabor ===
Aznoth-tabor is the name of a place in the territory of the Tribe of Naphtali. It is probably the modern Khirbet el-Jebeil, c. 3 miles north of Mount Tabor.

== B ==
=== Beer ===
Beer was a location reached by the Israelites during their Exodus journey, mentioned in Numbers 21:16-18. After the death of Aaron, the Israelites moved on, apparently at pace, through a series of locations along the Moabite/Amorite border. There was a well at Beer, where Moses was able to assemble and refresh the travelling community, and which was associated with a song regarding the Israelite leaders and 'the lawgiver' in providing water.

Another Beer (or Bera) is mentioned in Judges 9:21 as the place to which Gideon's youngest son, Joatham or Jotham, fled to escape from Abimelech after his 69 brothers had been killed. Matthew Poole described Beer as "a place remote from Shechem, and out of Abimelech's reach"; and the Pulpit Commentary suggests it is "either the same as Beeroth, among the heights of the tribe of Benjamin (Joshua 9:17), now El-Birch, 'the first halting-place for caravans on the northern road from Jerusalem' (Arthur Penrhyn Stanley, Sinai and Palestine, p. 210); or a place called by Eusebius 'Beta', now El-Birch, eight Roman miles from Eleutheropolis (now Beit Jibrin), and possibly the same as the place of the same name described by Maundrell as four hours from Jerusalem, and two hours west of Bethel; or, as Ewald thinks, Beer beyond Jordan (Numbers 21:16 [see above])". The commentary concludes that "it is impossible to decide which, or whether any, of these is the place designated as Jotham's place of refuge.

=== Beer-lahai-roi ===
Beer-lahai-roi, or the well of the Living One who sees me, is the name of a well in the Negev where the angel of the LORD appeared to Hagar. Later the Book of Genesis states that Isaac stayed near it. Genesis 16 locates this well in the wilderness of Beer-sheba, "on the way to Shur ... between Kadesh and Bered". Because the Beer in Beer-lahai-roi is simply the Hebrew word "well", the King James Version renders the whole expression "the well Lahairoi". Genesis 24:62 has Isaac returning from the well before Rebekah, his wife to-be, was seen coming from Nahor. H. E. Ryle thinks that "the Hebrew text (of Genesis 24:62) is probably corrupt. Literally rendered, it runs, 'And Isaac came from the coming of the well'; this has been understood to mean 'from the direction of the well' ... The clause evidently intends to state that the vicinity of Beer-lahai-roi (Genesis 16:14, Genesis 25:11) is the scene of the meeting between Isaac and Rebekah."

The biblical references to it may place it somewhere in the vicinity of the modern Bir 'Asluj.

=== Beeroth ===
R7 G29 M17 E23 X1 G43
bȝ(j)rtw
in hieroglyphs
Era: New Kingdom
(1550–1069 BC)

See Beeroth (biblical city).
Beeroth (Hebrew: בְּאֵרוֹת; in LXX Ancient Greek: Βηρωθ) is a minor city in Gibeon mentioned in Joshua 9:17. Maspero, Petrie, also Müller and Budge identify the place name Baertou mentioned in the Annals of Thutmose III at Temple of Karnak as biblical Beeroth.

=== Beon ===
Beon is a location mentioned only in Numbers 32:3. It may be a copying error for "Meon".

=== Bera ===
An alternative name for Beer.

=== Bered ===
Bered is a location mentioned only in Genesis 16:14, which locates Hagar between Kadesh and Bered at the time of her meeting with an angel while pregnant.

=== Berothah ===
Berothah is a place mentioned in passing in Ezekiel 47:16.

=== Beth-Anath ===
A place mentioned in Judges 1:33 and situated in the tribal territory of Naphtali.

=== Bethanath ===
Bethanath

=== Betharabah ===
Betharabah

=== Beth-aram ===
Beth-aram

=== Betharbel ===
Betharbel (Hosea 10:14)

=== Beth-aven ===
Beth-aven was a city located within the tribal territory of Benjamin (Joshua 18:12), associated with Jonathan's triumph over the Philistines in the Battle of Michmas. Beth-aven, in Hosea 4:15 It Is opposed to Beth-el. In the same book, a caution is issued to Beth-Aven alongside Gibeah and Ramah about a looming invasion. Proposals for Beth-Aven's location vary, with none confirmed. Some suggest it is a derogatory term for Beth-el, reflecting its association with Jeroboam's golden calf.

=== Beth-azmaveth ===
Beth-azmaveth

=== Beth-barah ===
A place mentioned in Judges 7:24.

=== Beth-birei ===
Beth-birei

=== Beth Car ===
Beth-car, Beth Car: The point to which the Israelites drove back the Philistines following their raid on the Israelite assembly convened by Samuel at Mizpah, recorded in 1 Samuel 7:5-12.

=== Beth-diblathaim ===
Beth-diblathaim

=== Bethemek ===
Bethemek

=== Bether ===
Bether

=== Beth-ezal ===
Beth-ezal

=== Beth-gader ===
Beth-gader

=== Beth-gamul ===
Beth-gamul

=== Beth Jeshimoth ===
Beth Jeshimoth (Hebrew, Beit ha-Yeshimot) was a town in the Transjordan, which is mentioned in four verses of the Hebrew Bible: Numbers 33:49, Joshua 12:3 and 13:20, and Ezekiel 25:9. Numbers mentions it in a description of where the Israelites encamped during their wilderness journeys. According to Joshua 13:20, it was part of the land allocated to the Tribe of Reuben. Ezekiel 25:9 lists it as one of three cities which constitute "the glory of the country" of Moab, in a passage in which God promises to punish Moab. During the First Jewish-Roman War, Beth Jeshimoth (Bezemoth) was captured by the Roman Imperial army, and was used by them to resettle deserters who had joined the Roman ranks.

The King James Version spells the name as Bethjesimoth and Bethjeshimoth. Classical Greek sources: Bezemoth.

Beth Jeshimoth is commonly identified with the village of Sweimeh in modern-day Jordan.

=== Beth Lebaoth ===
Beth Lebaoth, Beth-lebaoth or Lebaoth is located in the Negev, and in territory which according to the Book of Joshua was assigned to the Tribe of Simeon.

=== Beth-marcaboth ===
Beth-marcaboth

=== Beth-meon ===
Beth-meon

=== Beth-millo ===
Beth-millo, Judges 9:6, Judges 9:20

=== Beth Pelet ===
Beth Pelet (spelled Bethpalet and Bethphelet in the King James Version) was a location in the territory assigned to the Tribe of Judah by Joshua 15:27, and was occupied by Judahites in Yehud Medinata following the return from the Babylonian captivity according to Nehemiah 11:26. Its location is not certain, but may have been along the southern edge of Judah near the border with Edom.

=== Beth-pazzez ===
Beth-pazzez

=== Beth Peor ===
Beth Peor – also transliterated as Bethpeor (KJ21), Beth-peor (ASV), Beth-pe'or (RSV), Beit-P'or (CJB) or Phogar (Douai-Rheims Bible) – is, according to Deuteronomy 3:29 and Deuteronomy 4:46, the location "opposite which" the Israelites were camped after their victories over Sihon, king of the Amorites and Og, king of Bashan, after their captured lands were allocated to the tribes of Reuben, Gad and Manasseh, and where Moses delivered his sermon summarizing covenant history and the Ten Commandments in the narrative of the book of Deuteronomy.

=== Beth-phelet ===
Beth-phelet

=== Beth-rapha ===
Beth-rapha

=== Bilhah ===
A place mentioned in 1 Chronicles 4:29 where the sons of Shimei settled.

=== Bohan ===
See Stone of Bohan.

== C ==
=== Caleb-ephrathah ===
Caleb-ephrathah or Caleb-ephratah is a place mentioned only in 1 Chronicles 2:24, where it is said that Hezron died there.

=== Camon ===
Kamon is mentioned only once in the Bible. While only one Hebrew name is given in the Masoretic text, both Καμων (Kamôn) and Ραμμω (Rhammô) are found in the Septuagint manuscripts.

In the 19th century, Easton believed it was probably located on the slopes of Mount Carmel. One possible etymology of the term could come from קָמָה (Qamāh), which means "to rise", possibly indicating that it was a fortified place situated on high ground. A place named Καμους (Kamous) was mentioned by Polybius and was conquered by Antiochus III. It might be the same location.

However, according to more recent research, the term might have a primarily symbolic meaning, deriving from the Greek Kαμίνος (Kaminos), which means "furnace". This interpretation is reinforced by Pseudo-Philo, who interprets a passage related to Jair by stating: "And in the fire in which you will die, there you will have a dwelling place."

=== Carem ===
Carem appears in the Septuagint version of the Book of Joshua.

=== Casiphia ===
Casiphia or Kasiphia is a place-name found only in Ezra 8:17, referring to an unknown location in Babylon. Ezra is recorded as having gotten Levites from Casiphia in order to serve in the temple of Jerusalem.

=== Cave of Makkedah ===
See Makkedah.

=== Chephirah ===
See Chephirah.

=== Chezib ===
Chezib, a Canaanite village where the sons of Judah were born, thought to be Khirbet Ghazy; now a ruin.

=== Culon ===
Culon appears in the Septuagint version of the Book of Joshua.

== D ==
=== Diblah ===
Diblah (also called Diblath) is a place-name found in Ezekiel 6:14. It is probably a variant form of the name Riblah.

=== Dilean ===
Dilean is a place-name found in Joshua 15:38, in a list of locations allotted to the tribe of Judah in the Shephelah. The site is unknown, but from the position of the town in the list, it would appear to be somewhere north of Tel Lachish and Eglon.

=== Dimonah ===
Dimonah is a place listed in Joshua 15:22 as being inside the territory of Judah along its southern border with Edom. It may be the same as Dibon.

=== Dura ===
The "plain of Dura" is a location mentioned in Daniel 3:1, as the place where the king of Babylon built an image of himself. The location is uncertain, as there were several places named Dura in the region.

== E ==
=== Eglaim ===
Eglaim is a Moabite city mentioned by Isaiah in his proclamation against Moab (Isaiah 15:8). Its location is unknown.

=== Elealeh ===
Elealeh was a Moabite town. Every time it is mentioned in the Bible, Heshbon is mentioned as well. The Book of Numbers assigns Elealeh to the Tribe of Reuben. Thomas Kelly Cheyne believed that where the present Hebrew text of Isaiah 15:8 reads Beer Elim, the original likely read b- [Hebrew preposition "in"] Elealeh. Today the location of the biblical Elealeh is called elʿAl.

=== Eleph ===
Eleph is the name given in Joshua 18:28, apparently for a town in the territory of the Tribe of Benjamin. Because the name "Eleph" means thousand, and because the form found in Joshua is in Hebrew ha-eleph, literally "the thousand", Thomas Kelly Cheyne believed there was an error in the text, and that ha-eleph was a copyist's mistake for either Taralah or Irpeel. Another understanding of the word is that it is part of a compound name for a town called Zela Haeleph, instead of "Zela" and "Eleph" being two distinct towns, as in the King James Version. Conder and Kitchener identified Eleph with Lifta.

=== Elon-beth-hanan ===
Elon-beth-hanan (sometimes written Elonbethhanan, Elonbeth-hanan, Elon Bethhanan, etc.) is apparently the name of a place recorded in 1 Kings 4:9. 1 Kings 4 asserts that Solomon, king of Israel, divided his kingdom into twelve administrative districts, each with a governor responsible for delivering taxation from the region to the king. The region assigned to a Ben-Deker is recorded as including Makaz, Shaalbim, Beth-shemesh, and Elon-beth-hanan. Instead of beth, some manuscripts read ben, the Hebrew word for "son of," yielding the reading "Elon son of Hanan." Instead of "Elon-beth-hanan," the Septuagint reads "and Elon as far as Beth-hanan", a reading endorsed as "probably right" by the Encyclopaedia Biblica, although the Encyclopaedia expresses doubt as to whether "Beth-hanan" is correct.

=== Elon-meonenim ===
See Meonenim.

=== Eltolad ===
Eltolad is a location in Canaan mentioned in the Book of Joshua. Joshua 15:30 considers it a part of the territory of Judah in the Negev along the southern border with Edom, but Joshua 19:4 treats it as part of the territory of the Tribe of Simeon. 1 Chronicles 4:29 refers to it as "Tolad."

=== Enaim ===
Enaim is a place on the road to Timnah where Tamar waited for Judah in Genesis 38:14, mentioned again in Genesis 38:21. The name of the town means "wells".

=== Enam ===
Enam, according to Joshua 15:34, was a lowland town in the Shephelah of the Tribe of Judah. It may be the same location as Enaim (above).

=== En-eglaim ===
En-eglaim (Eneglaim, En Eglaim) is a location mentioned in a vision of the prophet Ezekiel. According to his vision, the Dead Sea (a salty lake in which fish cannot live) would one day be filled with fresh water, and fishers would cast their nets "from Engedi to En-eglaim." According to Thomas Kelly Cheyne (1899), a likely theory would be that the place referred to is near where the Jordan River empties into the Dead Sea, resulting in the freshwater fish washed into the Dead Sea dying of the excessive salt content and washing up dead on the beach. Cheyne suggested Ain Hajleh (Ain Hajlah) as a possible location, thinking that the Hebrew Eglaim might be a later version in a text which originally read "Hoglah," as in the place-name "Beth-hoglah." At present the exact location is still unidentified, though proposals include Ain Hajlah, Ain Feshka, or Eglaim.

=== En-gannim ===
En-gannim is the name of two towns mentioned in the Hebrew Bible.

- A town in the Shephelah of Judah, according to Joshua 15:34.
- A town in the territory of the Tribe of Issachar, according to Joshua 19:21. See also Anem.

=== En-haddah ===
En-haddah is a town mentioned only once in the Bible, in Joshua 19:21, where it is assigned to the territory of the Tribe of Issachar. Due to its placement in a list of towns, it would appear to be close to En-gannim, which immediately precedes it.

=== En-hakkore ===
En-hakkore is the name of a fountain, mentioned only in Judges 15:18-19. In the biblical narrative, Samson the Israelite hero is thirsty, and calls (kara) to God in fear that he will die of thirst. In response, God causes a spring to miraculously appear. Samson memorializes the incident by naming the spring En Hakkore, Hebrew for "spring of the caller." According to Encyclopaedia Biblica, the original etymology of En-hakkore is "spring of the partridge," while the meaning "spring of the caller" is a later legendary invention.

=== Ephratha ===
Ephratha (Bethlehem); from the Septuagint version of the Book of Joshua.

=== Esek ===
Esek is the name of the first of two wells which, according to Genesis 26:20, were the object of an argument between Isaac's herdsmen and herdsmen from the Philistine city of Gerar. The Hebrew form of the name as preserved in the Masoretic Text is Esek, while Greek Septuagint manuscripts have the forms Adikia, or Sykophantia. The name given in the Vulgate is Calumnia.

=== En-shemesh ===
En-shemesh, meaning "fountain of the sun", is the name of a place along the border between Judah and the Tribe of Benjamin, between Ein Rogel and Adummim.

=== Eshan ===
Eshan (Eshean) is the name of a place in the hill-country of the territory of the Tribe of Judah. The location has not been identified.

=== Esora ===
Esora is the King James Bible and Revised Version spelling of "Aesora". See Aesora.

=== Eth-kazin ===
Eth-kazin (KJV Ittah-kazin) is the name of a place along the border of the territory of the Tribe of Zebulun, according to Joshua 19:13.

=== Ezel ===
Ezel appears to be the name given to a cairn, rock or milestone in a biblical story concerning David and Jonathan (1 Samuel 20:19). David, the future king of Israel, is a close friend of Jonathan, the son of then-king Saul. Jonathan warns David that Saul may be seeking to kill him, and instructs David to flee. Jonathan instructs David to wait "at the rock Ezel" until Jonathan can understand Saul's intentions, which he will then signal to David so that David can know whether to flee or stay in Saul's court. According to some biblical critics, the word "Ezel" is not a proper noun in Hebrew, and is either a scribal mistake of some kind or a word which is not understood by biblical scholars. The Revised Standard Version refers to it as "yonder stone heap".

== G ==
=== Galeed ===
Galeed, according to Genesis 31:47-48, is the name given by Jacob to the place where he and Laban reached a peace agreement. The name is Hebrew for "testimonial mound", and is a reference to the pile of stones erected by Jacob and Laban as a memorial, or "witness", of the agreement between the two relatives. Laban called the stone "Jegar-Sahadutha", the Aramaic equivalent of the Hebrew "Galeed".

=== Gallim ===
Gallim is a biblical place-name. In the Masoretic Text of the Hebrew Bible, Gallim is the name of one location, while the Greek Septuagint contains two locations by that name.

In Isaiah 10:30, the village of Gallim is mentioned alongside Laishah (Tel Dan) and Anathoth, placing it somewhere north of Jerusalem. Michal in 1 Samuel, best known for being the wife of David, was briefly the wife of Palti, son of Laish, a man identified as coming from Gallim.

An additional Gallim (or Galem) is mentioned in the Septuagint text of 15:59a, which contains additional cities assigned to the tribe of Judah which are not recorded in the Masoretic Text.

=== Gath-rimmon ===
Gath-rimmon, the Levitical city from Joshua 19:45, Joshua 21:25 and 1 Chronicles 6:69, has been identified by Benjamin Mazar with Tel Gerisa. Anson Rainey supported the notion that it is identical with Gittaim and is to be found at or near Ramla.

=== Gebim ===
Gebim is a biblical place-name which appears only in Isaiah 10:31, in which it is said that "the inhabitants of Gebim gather themselves to flee." The location of Gebim is unknown.

=== Gederothaim ===
Gederothaim is a place-name which appears only in Joshua 15:36, in a list of locations possessed by the Tribe of Judah in the Shephelah. Because it appears immediately after the mention of Gederah, some scholars have suggested that "Gederothaim" was introduced by a mistaken copying of the name "Gederah."

=== Geliloth ===
Geliloth is a place-name mentioned in Joshua 18:17, where it describes a location along the boundaries of the territory assigned to the Tribe of Benjamin. The name means "stone-circles."

=== Gibbar ===
Gibbar is a "district of Judah" mentioned in a list of returnees from the Babylonian captivity, where the list claims that 95 of the "sons [i.e. people] of Gibbar" returned.

=== Ginath ===
For the possible place-name Ginath, see List of biblical figures § Ginath.

=== Gittaim ===
Gittaim is a place-name which appears several times in the Hebrew Bible. According to Thomas Kelly Cheyne, "there were probably several Gittaims".

- A town called Gittaim in the territory of the Tribe of Benjamin appears in Nehemiah 11:33.
- A town called Gittaim is where the Beerothites were accepted as resident aliens according to 2 Samuel 4:3.
- Based on readings found in the Greek Septuagint, Cheyne suggested that "Gittaim is also probably the name of a town in or near Edom", referred to in Genesis 36:35 and 1 Chronicles 1:46, where the Hebrew text now reads "Avith". Anson Rainey also places "Gath/Gittaim/Gath-rimmon", clearly different from Gath of the Philistines, at or near Ramla.
- In the Septuagint, 1 Samuel 14:33 contains a reference to a Gittaim (Greek geththaim), although Cheyne believes the Septuagint's reading here to be a "manifest error".

=== Gur-baal ===
Gur-baal is the name of a place mentioned in 2 Chronicles 26:7. According to the Chronicler, it was inhabited by "Arabians", and was the object of a successful attack by Uzziah, the king of Judah.

== H ==
=== Habor ===
Habor is the biblical name for the Khabur River, which was in the wilderness of Judah, and mentioned in 2 Kings 17:6, 18:11.

=== Hachilah ===
The Hill of Hachilah is a place in the wilderness of Judah. It is mentioned in 1 Samuel 23:19, 26:1 as a place where David hid from Saul.

=== Hadad-Rimmon ===
See Zechariah 12:11, Rummanah, Legio, Maximianopolis (Palestine), Hadad.

=== Hadashah ===
F18 Y1 D46 Z4 Aa18 Z1 U33 M17 N18 or F18 Y1 D46 G1 Aa18 Z1 V13 N25
ḥwdjsꜣtꜣ(j) or ḥwdꜣsꜣṯ
in hieroglyphs
Era: New Kingdom
(1550–1069 BC)

Hadashah (Hebrew: חֲדָשָׁה; in LXX Ancient Greek: Ἀδασὰν), mentioned only in once in the Bible in the Book of Joshua, was a city in the valley of Judah. Its name means 'new'. It is mentioned among the cities smitten by Ramesses III in his lists at the Temple of Karnak and the Mortuary Temple of Ramesses III at Medinet Habu as Houdasatha.

=== Hali ===
Hali is mentioned only in Joshua 19:25, in a list of cities assigned to the Tribe of Asher. Stanley Cook believed the name "Hali" may have been a scribal error for "Helbah."

=== Hammath ===
Hammath was one of the fortified cities of Naphtali. Some see it as being the same as Hammoth-dor.

=== Hammon ===
Hammon is the name of two places in the Hebrew Bible. The first is along the borders of the Tribe of Asher. The second is a Levitical city inside the territory of the Tribe of Naphtali, which is probably identical to Hammath and Hammoth-dor (1 Chronicles 6:76), or verse 61 in some Bibles.

=== Hammoth-dor ===
Hammoth-dor was a Levitical city of Naphtali. See Hammoth-dor.

=== Hamonah ===
Hamonah is a city mentioned in Ezekiel's apocalyptic prophecy, located, according to the text as it now stands, in the "Valley of Hamon-Gog." Thomas Kelly Cheyne expressed doubt as to whether the text originally read "Hamonah," suggesting that scribal error may have obscured a more original reading.

=== Hapharaim ===
Hapharaim or Haphraim is a town listed as being part of the territory of the Tribe of Issachar in the Book of Joshua.

=== Hareth ===
Hareth or Hereth is a forested area in Judah to which David and his family return after leaving refuge in Moab, at the direction of the prophet Gad. It is thought to have been somewhere on the border of the Philistine plain, in the southern part of Judah.

=== Hazar-addar ===
Hazar-addar is a name which appears only in Numbers 34:4, where it refers to a location on the southern edge of the territory belonging to the Tribe of Judah. According to Thomas Kelly Cheyne, the original text of Joshua 15:3 probably contained a reference to the place city.

=== Hazar-enan ===
Hazar-enan (sometimes spelled Hazar Enan or Hazarenan) is mentioned in Ezekiel 47:17 as a location along the northeastern edge of the land of Canaan according to Ezekiel's "ideal" borders. The Aramaic Targum Jonathan ben Uzziel on Numbers 34:9–10 renders its translation as ṭirath ʿenawatha ("walled suburb of the springs"). According to the Encyclopaedia Biblica, Ezekiel 47:16 probably originally contained the name "Hazar-enan" where it now contains "Hazar-hatticon".

=== Hazar-gaddah ===
Hazar-gaddah is a location listed in Joshua 15:27 as one of the cities along the southern border of Judah with Edom.

=== Hazar-shual ===
Hazar-shual was a city in the territory of the Tribe of Simeon, along its border with Judah.

=== Hazar-susah ===
Hazar-susah, also called Hazar-susim, is among the cities listed in the Book of Joshua as being part of the inheritance of the Tribe of Simeon. It is mentioned only in Joshua 19:5 and 1 Chronicles 4:13.

=== Hazer-hatticon ===
Hazer-hatticon is a location that appears on the northern border of the land of Canaan according to Ezekiel's idealized conception its borders. According to the Encyclopaedia Biblica, the name is likely a miswritten form of Hazar-enan.

=== Hazor-hadattah ===
Hazor-hadattah, Aramaic for "New Hazor," was a place mentioned in Joshua 15:25, on the border between Judah and the Edom.

=== Heleph ===
Heleph, as the Masoretic Text now stands, appears to be the name of a place located in the territory of the Tribe of Naphtali. It appears only in Joshua 19:33. According to Thomas Kelly Cheyne, the verse appears to have undergone copying errors, and the word "Heleph" was probably not an original part of the verse.

=== Helkath ===
Helkath (Hebrew: חֶלְקַת) is a location on the boundary of the tribe of Asher.

=== Helkath-hazzurim ===
Helkath-hazzurim, a term which appears in 2 Samuel 2:16, is the name of a site where the troops of David fought the troops of Ish-bosheth. The location is described as "Helkath-hazzurim, which is in Gibeon," although Stanley A. Cook suggested that the words "which is in Gibeon" were a later explanatory note added to the text, and that the story may originally have been set in another location.

=== Hena ===
Hena is the name of a place or nation mentioned only in a single speech in the Hebrew Bible, by the Rabshakeh, an official of Sennacharib, who mentioned it in threatening the Judahites in the time of king Hezekiah. The Rabshakeh warned the Israelites that his employer, the Assyrian Empire, would defeat the kingdom of Judah, and that the Israelites should not trust their deity to save them. He supported his argument by pointing to other places conquered by the Assyrians, and pointed out that the gods of those locations had not managed to prevent conquest. "Where is the king of Hamath, and the king of Arpad, and the king of the city of Sepharvaim, of Hena, and Ivvah?" The locations of Hena and Ivvah are unknown to the present day. Thomas Kelly Cheyne suggested that the name "Hena" has found its way into the verse "through a scribe's error."

=== Hepher ===
Hepher is a place name found in the Hebrew Bible. In the conquest narratives of the Book of Joshua, there is a list of 31 kings defeated by the invading Israelites. These kings are unnamed, but referred to simply in terms of what town they ruled, and a "king of Hepher" is listed among them in Joshua 12:17. Later, in the narratives about Solomon, Solomon divides his land into twelve districts, each ruled by a governor in charge of collecting tribute. The district assigned to the Ben-Hesed included "all the land of Hepher." In addition to these explicit references to a place known as Hepher, there are veiled references to Hepher in etiological genealogical passages, in which historical regions and ethnic groupings are described as if descended from a family tree populated by individual forefathers. In these narratives, a "person" named Hepher is described as being a descendant of Manasseh, indicating that Hepher was, at some point, ruled by people identified with the Tribe of Manasseh. The people of Hepher are identified as "Hepherites" in Numbers 26:32.

The biblical mentions of Hepher are not enough to locate the town with any precision: it is not even certain whether Hepher is to be found in the Transjordan or in Cisjordan.

=== Heshmon ===
Heshmon is the name of a town mentioned in Joshua 15:27, in a list of towns on the border between Judah and Edom. The name Heshmon may be the basis for the term Hasmonean (Hebrew hashmoni), as the Hasmoneans may have had their origin in Heshmon.

=== Holon ===
Holon (Hilen, Hilez) is the name of two biblical towns.

- A city in the hill-country of Judah according to Joshua 15:21 and Joshua 21:15, but its site is unknown. It is also referred to as Hilen or Hilez in 1 Chronicles 6:58 (verse 43 in some Bibles).
- A town in Moab, mentioned in Jeremiah 48:21 at the head of a list of towns to be "judged" by God for Moab's misdeeds.

=== Horem ===
Horem was one of the fortified cities of Naphtali according to Joshua 19:38. The exact location is unknown.

=== Hosah ===
M12 G47 G1 M17 M17
ḫꜣṯꜣjj
in hieroglyphs
Era: New Kingdom
(1550–1069 BC)

Hosah (Hebrew: חֹסָה), according to Joshua 19:29, was a city on the border between the Tribe of Asher and Tyre. Where the Masoretic Text reads "Hosah," an important Greek Septuagint manuscript reads "Iaseif," leading to uncertainty about what the original reading was. The location is unknown, but researchers are inclined towards Tell Rashidiyeh or Khirbet el-Hos, today both in Lebanon, one S of Tyre, the other South-East of it.

=== Hukkok ===
Hukkok or Huquq was a town near Zebulun, on the border of Naphtali. Many commentators have identified it with Yaquq.

=== Humtah ===
Humtah was a city of Judah according to Joshua 15:54, whose location has not been identified. Its name in Hebrew means 'snail'.

=== Hushah ===
Hushah was a place in the hill country of Judah founded by a son of Ezer (1 Chronicles 4:4). It is generally identified with Husan, south-west of Bethlehem. One of David's Mighty Warriors is identified in the Bible as "Sibbecai the Hushathite."

== I ==
=== Idalah ===
Idalah is the name of a town in the territory of the Tribe of Zebulun according to Joshua 19:15, the only place in the Hebrew Bible where it is mentioned.

=== Ijon ===
O29 D36 M17 M17 N35 G1
ˁȝˁjnȝ
in hieroglyphs
Era: New Kingdom
(1550–1069 BC)

Ijon (Hebrew: עיּוֹן; in LXX Ancient Greek: Άίν) is the name of a place mentioned three times in the Hebrew Bible. In 1 Kings 15:20 and the parallel passage in 2 Chronicles 16:4, along with Dan and Abel-beth-maacah (Kings account, Chronicles reads "Abel-maim"), it is conquered by Ben-Hadad I of Aram during the time of Baasha of Israel (c.900 to c.877 BCE). In 2 Kings 15:29, Ijon along with Abel-beth-maacah and several other places are taken captive by Tiglath-Pileser III (reigned 745-727 BCE) during the reign of Pekah. It was slightly north of the modern-day site of Metula. Budge and Paton equate Ijon with the hieroglyphic place name 'Aiina.

Ijon is commonly identified with Tel Dibbine, a tell near Marjayoun, Lebanon.

=== Iphtah ===
Iphtah (the King James Version spells it Jiphtah) was, according to Joshua 15:43, a place in the Shephelah of the Tribe of Judah. The location is unknown today.

=== Iphtah-el ===
Iphtah-el (the King James Version spells it Jiphtah-el) is the name of a place mentioned only in Joshua 19:14 and 19:27. Joshua describes it as being along the northern border of the Tribe of Zebulun, in the area adjoining the territory of the Tribe of Asher. The biblical Iphtah-el is probably the place known today as Khirbet Japhet.

=== Irpeel ===
Irpeel is the name of a town mentioned only in Joshua 18:27, in the territory of the Tribe of Benjamin.

=== Ithlah ===
Ithlah (King James Version Jethlah) is a location which, according to Joshua 19:42, was part of the territory of the Tribe of Dan. The location has not been identified by modern scholarship.

=== Ittah-kazin ===
See Eth-kazin.

== J ==
=== Jabneel ===
Jabneel (once Jabneh) is the name given in the Hebrew Bible for two locations.

- The first is a Philistine city, considered by Joshua 15:11 to have belonged to the territory of the Tribe of Judah. In 2 Chronicles 26:6, where the name is shortened to "Jabneh," it is recorded that Uzziah, as part of his attacks on Philistine cities, broke down its wall.
- The second is assigned by Joshua 19:33 to the territory of the Tribe of Naphtali.

=== Jahaz ===
Jahaz (or Jahaza, Jahazah, Jahzah. Iahaz) was the site of the battle between King Sihon and the advancing Israelite people, according to Numbers 21:23 and later became a levitical city in the territory of Reuben, east of the River Jordan.

Jahaz is mentioned in both the Hebrew Bible (Yahats, Isaiah 16:4, Jeremiah 48:34; "Yahatsah" or "Yahtsah", Numbers 21:23, Deuteronomy 2:32, Joshua 13:18, Joshua 21:36) and the King James Version ("Jahazah": Judges 11:20, Jeremiah 48:21, 1 Chronicles 6:78 "Jahzah") and in the Mesha Stele.

André Lemaire places it somewhere along the northeast border of Moab. Several scholars, including Yohanan Aharoni, J. Andrew Dearman, Israel Finkelstein and Oded Lipschits have identified it with Khirbet Mudayna (Wadi ath-Thamad), a fortified ruin on the Dhiban Plateau.

=== Janim ===
Janim or Janum is a location mentioned only in Joshua 15:53, which places it in the hill-country of Judah, somewhere near Beth-tappuah.

=== Jearim ===
Mount Jearim is mentioned in Joshua 15:10, a verse which described the northern border of the Tribe of Judah. According to the Encyclopaedia Biblica the term described in this case not a mountain in the modern sense of the word, but a ridge, and "Jearim" is probably an incorrect reading where "Jarib" or "Ephron" was originally intended.

=== Jegar-sahadutha ===
See Galeed.

=== Jeruel ===
The "wilderness of Jeruel" is the place where, according to 2 Chronicles 20:16, Jahaziel told Jehoshaphat to expect an invading army of Moabites, Ammonites, and Edomites.

=== Jethlah ===
See Ithlah.

=== Jiphtah ===
See Iphtah.

=== Jiphtah-el ===
See Iphtah-el.

=== Jogbehah ===
Jogbehah is a city east of the Jordan River, mentioned in Numbers 32:35, as one of the locations in the Transjordan granted to the Tribe of Gad by Moses. It reappears in the story of Gideon. It was probably an Ammonite fortress, now named Rugm al-Gubekha.

=== Jokdeam ===
Jokdeam is the name of a location mentioned only once in the Bible, in Joshua 15:56. The passage identifies it as being in the hill-country of Judah, but beyond that its location is unknown today.

== K ==
=== Kamon ===
See Camon

=== Kasiphia ===
See Casiphia

=== Kirjathjearim ===
See Kiriath-Jearim

=== Kithlish ===
Kithlish is a man's wall and town in the plain of Judah (Joshua 15:40). It has been identified with Jelameh.

== L ==
=== Laharoi ===
See Beer-lahai-roi.

=== Lebaoth ===
See Beth Lebaoth.

=== Lecah ===
Lecah or Lekah is a place mentioned in 1 Chronicles 4:21, which claims that Er, the son of Judah (son of Jacob) settled there.

=== Luhith ===
The "ascent of Luhith" is a location in Moab mentioned in Isaiah 15:5 and Jeremiah 48:5.

== M ==
=== Mahaneh Dan ===
Mahaneh Dan or Mahaneh-dan is a location associated with the tribe of Dan. According to Judges 18:12, it was located to the west of Kirjath-jearim. On the other hand, Judges 13:25 names it as the place where Samson lived and where "the spirit of the LORD began to stir in him", but gives it a different location, "between Zorah and Eshtaol".

=== Makaz ===
Makaz is a location mentioned in 1 Kings 4:9, in a passage which describes king Solomon administering the kingdom of Israel by division into twelve districts. Makaz appears in a list of cities the rest of which belonged to the territory traditionally assigned to the Tribe of Dan, so it appears likely that Makaz was originally intended as a reference to some location in Dan.

=== Makkedah ===
G17 D38 N29 G1 N16 or D38 N29 G43 N16 Z1 N21
m(j)ḳꜣtꜣ or mḳwtꜣ
in hieroglyphs
Era: New Kingdom
(1550–1069 BC)

Makkedah (Hebrew: מַקֵּדָה; in LXX Ancient Greek: Μακηδά or Μακέδ as in 1 Maccabees; in Vulgate Latin: Mageth) was a city in the land of Canaan. Joshua 12:16 gives a list of thirty-one cities whose kings, according to the Book of Joshua, were defeated in the conquest of Canaan following the Exodus, and Makkedah is included. Joshua 15:41 locates it in the part of the Shephelah assigned to the Tribe of Judah. Joshua 10 relates a story of five "Amorite" kings hiding in the "cave of Makkedah" after a battle; afterward, they were removed from the cave and killed in a humiliating fashion. After this, Makkedah was captured. Maspero, Müller and Budge identify Makouta mentioned in the Annals of Thutmose III at the Temple of Karnak with biblical Makkeda. Historical geographers have struggled with its modern identification, with PEF surveyors Conder & Kitchener thinking the ancient site to be where was once built the Arab village of el-Mughar, north of Nahal Sorek.

=== Manocho ===
Manocho appears in the Septuagint version of the Book of Joshua.

=== Maon ===
This entry is about the location known as Maon or the "Wilderness of Maon". For the ethnic group known by that name, see List of minor biblical tribes § Maon.

Maon, according to Joshua 15:55, was a place in the highlands of the Tribe of Judah identified in modern times with Khirbet Maʿin (or in Hebrew, Horvat Maʿon). According to 1 Samuel 23:24, the Wilderness of Maon, in the plain on the south of Jeshimon, was one of the places where David hid from King Saul. Nabal, the rich but callous property owner who refused to support David's men in 1 Samuel 23:1–11 was from Maon. In the Septuagint version of 1 Samuel, David retreated to the Wilderness of Maon after the death of Samuel, but in the Massoretic Text he went to the Wilderness of Paran.

Through the use of genealogy, Maon was personified as a descendant of Hebron.

There was an Arab village and there is now an Israeli settlement at Ma'on in the Hebron Hills of the West Bank.

=== Maralah ===
Maralah is a place mentioned only in Joshua 19:11, where it describes a locality in the territory of the Tribe of Zebulun, along its southwestern border.

=== Masrekah ===
Masrekah, according to Genesis 36:36 and 1 Chronicles 1:47, is where the Edomite king Samlah lived.

=== Meah ===
Meah is the name of a tower named in Nehemiah 3:1 and 12:39.

=== Mejarcon ===
Mejarcon (also spelled Mejarkon or Me-jarkon) was a location on the border of the tribe of Dan.

=== Meonenim ===
Meonenim appears in Judges 9:37, in the Hebrew phrase elon meonenim which is variously translated as "plain of Meonenim," "Elon-meonenim," "oak of Meonenim," or "the Diviners' Oak."

=== Mephaath ===
Mephaath was a levitical city of the Merarites lying in the district of the Mishor in the territory of the tribe of Reuben according to Joshua 21:37, and was mentioned in condemnation by the prophet Jeremiah in Jeremiah 48:21.

=== Michmethath ===
Michmethath (Michmethah, Mikmethath, Micmethath) is the name of a place mentioned in Joshua 16:6 and 17:7. 16:6 records that it is along the north end of the territory of the Tribe of Ephraim. 17:7 indicates that it was along the south end of the territory of the Tribe of Manasseh. From the biblical description it would appear to have been southeast of Shechem. Blessed Anne Catherine Emmerich places an As[h]er-Michmethah (Joshua 16:6) at modern Tayasir.

=== Middin ===
The town of Middin is mentioned in passing in Joshua 15:61, in a list of six towns in the wilderness of the territory of the tribe of Judah. Its exact location is unknown.

=== Migron ===
There is a place called Migron on the outskirts of Gibeah mentioned in 1 Samuel 14:2, where King Saul was based, different from the Migron mentioned in Isaiah 10:28, which is north of Michmash.

=== Minni ===
Minni is mentioned in Jeremiah 51:27 as the name of a province in Armenia, which was at this time under the Median kings. Armenia is regarded by some as Har-minni i.e., the mountainous country of Minni.

=== Minnith ===
Minnith is mentioned in Judges 11:33 as marking the extent of Jephthah's victory over the Ammonites and in Ezekiel 27:17 as a wheat-farming city. Minnith, Missouri takes its name from the reference in Ezekiel.

=== Misrephoth-maim ===
Misrephoth-maim is the name of a place associated with Sidon where, according to the Book of Joshua, Joshua pursued the retreating Canaanites after a battle at Merom. According to Joshua 13:6 it is found near the boundary between the northern territory of the Tribes of Israel and the Sidonians.

=== Mount Jearim ===
See Jearim.

== N ==
=== Neah ===
Neah is a location mentioned only in Joshua 19:13. The Book of Joshua places it in the territory of the Tribe of Zebulun, near the valley of Iphtah-el.

=== Neballat ===
Neballat is the name of a town listed among the towns where people of the Tribe of Benjamin lived according to Nehemiah 11:34. Today it is known as Beit Nebala.

=== Nezib or Netziv ===
Nezib or Netziv (נְצִיב, 'Garrison' or 'Pillar') is a city mentioned in Joshua 15:42–44 and still listed by Eusebius on the road from Hebron as "Nasib, 7 milestones from Eleutheropolis", widely identified by archaeologists with Khirbet Beit Nâsib. or Khirbet Beit Nattif / Ras en-Nesib (grid 148.8/111.9). See also Wadi el-Quff.

=== Nibshan ===
Nibshan is the name of a town in the wilderness of Judah, mentioned only in Judges 15:62.

=== No ===
No or No-amon is the name of a city in Egypt mentioned in negative terms by the prophets Jeremiah (46:25), Ezekiel (30:14-16), and Nahum (3:8). It is most commonly identified in modern scholarship with Thebes, but in the Septuagint, Vulgate, and a variety of rabbinical commentators it is interpreted as Alexandria.

== P ==
=== Parbar ===
Parbar, according to the King James Version, is a place-name mentioned in 1 Chronicles 26:18, in a description of the divisions of gatekeepers for the Temple in Jerusalem. However, in more recent scholarship, the word parbar or parwar is generally taken not as a proper noun, but as a common noun, with various proposals as to its meaning. Canadian academic Donna Runnalls suggests that "it seems to refer to a structure which was located at the top of the road on the west side of the temple". The New Revised Standard Version translates the word as " the colonnade on the west".

=== Perez Uzzah ===
Perez Uzzah (Hebrew, "outburst against Uzzah") is a place name which appears only in the biblical narrative about Uzzah, a man who was killed by God for touching the Ark of the Covenant (2 Samuel 6:8; 1 Chronicles 13:11). David named it in commemoration of Uzzah's death. The location has not been identified.

=== Phagor ===
Phagor (Greek: Φαγὼρ) appears in the Septuagint version of the Book of Joshua, in a grouping of 11 cities of Judah not listed in the Hebrew text. It is rendered as "Peor" in the Contemporary English Version (1995).

=== Pul ===
Pul, a place name in Isaiah 66:19 in Hebrew, may refer to Put or Phut.

== R ==
=== Rabbith ===
Rabbith, according to Joshua 19:20, was a location within the territory of the Tribe of Issachar.

=== Racal ===
Racal (or Rachal or Rakal), according to 1 Samuel 30:29, was one of the locations were David sent plunder after defeating a group of Amalekites. The site is unknown and mentioned nowhere else. It may have been a copyist's error for Carmel.

=== Rakkath ===
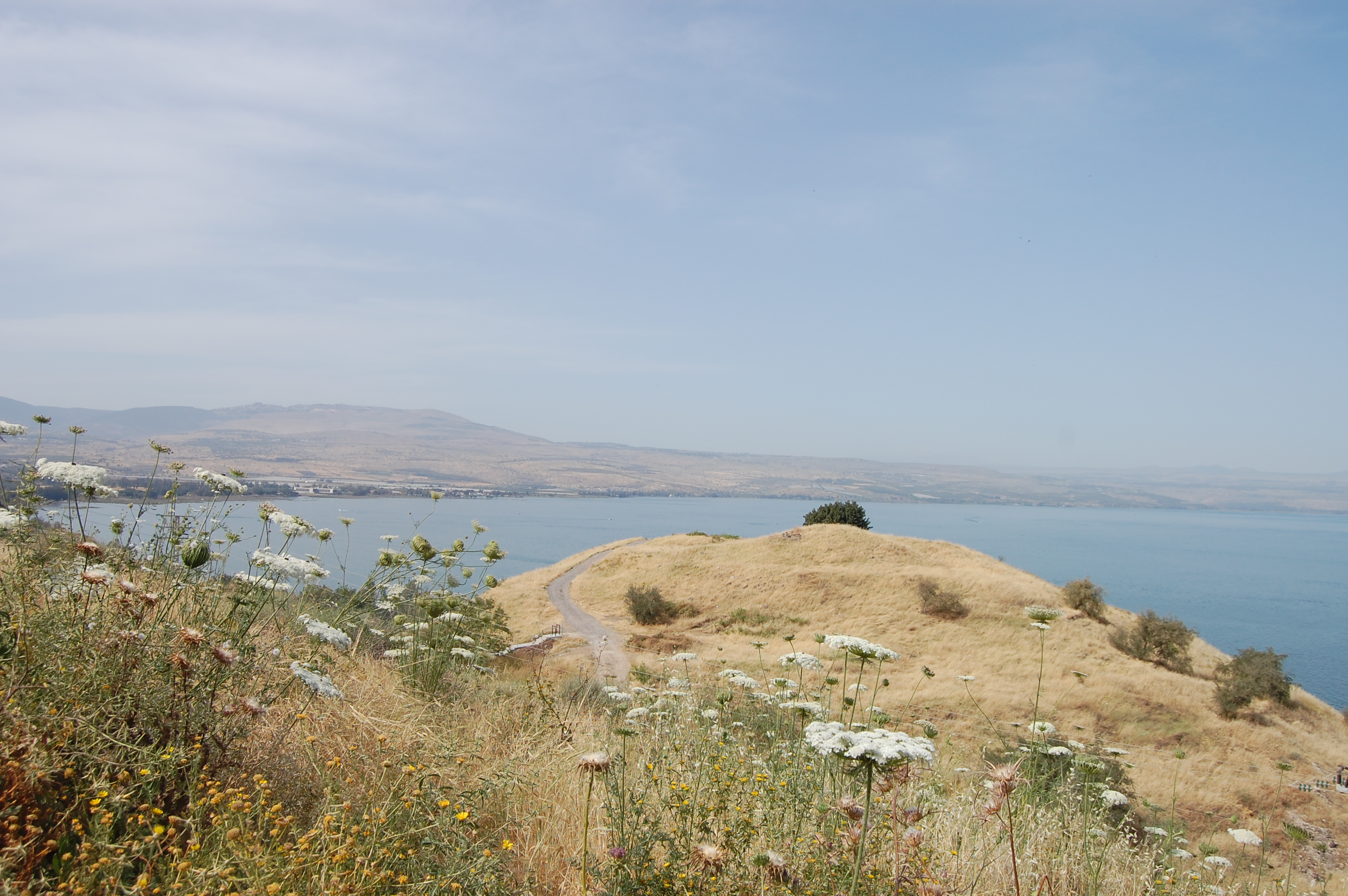
Tel Rakat, looking north over the Sea of Galilee

Rakkath (also Rakat or Rakkat) is mentioned in Joshua 19:35 as a fenced or fortified city in the territory of the Tribe of Naphtali and is considered according to Jewish tradition to be the location where the city of Tiberias was built from around 20 CE. It is identified by some with Tel Rakat (Khirbet el Kaneitriyeh on PEF Survey of Palestine map).

=== Rakkon ===
Rakkon, according to the Masoretic Text of Judges 19:46, is a place-name for a locality along the borders of the Tribe of Dan. A common opinion is that the place-name Rakkon (Hebrew hrqwn) originally through a mis-copying of part of the previous place-name Me Jarkon (Hebrew my hyrqwn), which is mentioned immediately preceding it. If it is a genuine place-name, its location is uncertain, and it is unclear whether it refers to a town or a river. The Septuagint omits it altogether.

=== Ramath-Mizpeh ===
Ramath-Mizpeh, according to Joshua 13:26, was a location in the territory of the Tribe of Gad, a Transjordanian tribe. It is possibly the same as present-day Iraq al-Amir.

=== Rammath-Lehi ===
'Rammath-Lehi, according to the Old Testament Book of Judges, was the name given to this place by Samson when he defeated a thousand Philistines.

=== Ramat-Negev ===
A place named Ramat-Negev (Hebrew rmt ngb) is assigned to the Tribe of Simeon by Joshua 19:8. It is likely the same as location as the Ramot-Negev (rmwt ngb) in 1 Samuel 30:27, where it is named as a location to which David sent plunder from his raid against the Amalekites. Ramat or Ramot Negev is also mentioned in one of the Arad ostraca, a series of letters recovered from Tel Arad, ordering that soldiers be sent to Ramat-Negev as protection against Edomite invasion.

It is possible that Ramot-Negev is the place now known as Hurvath Uza. See also Baalath-Beer.

=== Rekem ===
This is about the city. For individuals of the same name, see List of minor biblical figures § Rekem.

Rekem is the name of a city or fortified town in the territory of the Tribe of Benjamin according to Joshua 18:27. The location is unknown.

=== Rock of Escape ===
See Sela Hammahlekoth.

=== Rogelim ===
Rogelim is a place mentioned twice in 2 Samuel, both times in relation to Barzillai the Gileadite. It is identified as his city (17:27) and the place from which he came to meet King David after the revolt of Absalom (19:31). Its location was in Gilead but has not been precisely identified. Strong's Concordance calls it "a (place of) fullers.

=== Rumah ===
Rumah or Ruma is a place-name in the Hebrew Bible. It is mentioned in 2 Kings 23:26, which identifies king Jehoiakim's mother as "Zebudah, the daughter of Pedaiah of Rumah." A widespread, but not unanimous, identification sees this as the modern site of Ruma (Tell Rumeh) in the Lower Galilee.

Joshua 15:52 lists a "Rumah" or "Dumah" (depending on the manuscript followed) as a city in the hill-country of Judah. This is often associated with the modern village of Dūme, although scholars have expressed some uncertainty about this location as well.

== S ==
=== Salim ===
A place-name Salim appears in John 3:23, in the phrase "Aenon of Salim." The location has not been identified, though several possibilities have been suggested.

=== Sansannah ===
Sansannah appears in Joshua 15:31, in a list of towns in the Negev of Judah. Scholars equate it with the modern Kirbet esh-Shamsaniyat, although with some doubt. In Joshua 19, a portion of the territory of Judah is assigned to the Tribe of Simeon, and in this list instead of Sansannah the text reads "Hazar Susah" (verse 5).

=== Sebam ===
See Sibmah.

=== Secu ===
Secu (also Seku, Sechu) is a place-name found in 1 Samuel 19:22. Its site has not been identified, and it is mentioned nowhere else in the Bible.

=== Sela Hammahlekoth ===
Sela Hammahlekoth (or Rock of Escape) is the name which according to 1 Samuel 23:28 was given to a location where David narrowly escaped being killed by Saul. The location has not been definitely identified, but the biblical story places it in the Wilderness of Maon.

=== Seneh ===
Seneh is the name of one of two rocky cliffs (the other being Bozez) through which Jonathan had to pass during his attack against a Philistine garrison (1 Samuel 14:4).

=== Shaalbim ===
Shaalbim is the name of a location which appears twice (in the form "Shaalbim") in the Hebrew Bible, in Judges 3:5 and again in 1 Kings 4:9. The passage in Judges 1 discusses the situation after the death of Joshua, in which the Tribe of Dan had difficulty expelling the Amorites from the land allotted to them, and the Amorites forced the Danites to live in the hill-country, keeping the valley for themselves (Judges 1:1-34). "But the Amorites were resolved to dwell in Harheres, in Aijalon, and in Shaalbim; yet the hand of the house of Joseph prevailed, so that they became tributary. And the border of the Amorites was from the ascent of Akrabbim, from Sela, and upward."

1 Kings 4 records that Solomon divided his kingdom into districts under various governors, and chose a man named Ben Deker as governor "in Makaz, and in Shaalbim, and Beth-shemesh, and Elon-beth-hanan".

In Joshua 19:42, a Shaalabbin is listed as a location within the territory allotted to Dan, and it is thus likely to be the same as the location "Shaalbim" which Dan was unable to occupy. This is generally considered to have been located on the site of modern Salbit.

It may also be the same as the location referred to as "Shaalban" (2 Samuel 23:32; 1 Chronicles 11:33), and may have been the "Shaalim" of 1 Samuel 9:4.

=== Shaalim ===
Saul and his assistant passed through the land of Shaalim looking for his father's lost donkeys, according to 1 Samuel 9:4, probably in the highlands of Ephraim. Some manuscripts of the Septuagint locate the burial place of Abdon in Pirathon, in the hill country of Ephraim, in the land of Shaalim, although other versions read "in the hill country of the Amalekites".

=== Shamir ===
This is about the biblical locations, not the person mentioned in 1 Chronicles 24:24.

Shamir is the name of a biblical place which according to Joshua 15:48 was found in the hill-country of the Tribe of Judah.

According to Judges 10:1-2, the Israelite leader Tola lived, died, and was buried in a location called Shamir in the hill-country of the Tribe of Ephraim.

=== Shaveh Kiriathaim ===
According to Genesis 14:5, Chedorlaomer and his allies defeated the Emim at Shaveh Kiriathaim.

=== Shaveh, Valley of ===
A valley named Shaveh (or the King's Valley) is the location where, according to Genesis 14:17, Bera, the King of Sodom went to meet Abram after the defeat of the forces of Chedorlaomer.

=== Sibmah ===
Sibmah (Hebrew, Sibmah) is a location which according to Numbers 32:37-38 and Joshua 13:19 was in the territory of the Tribe of Reuben. In the King James Version it is sometimes spelled Shibmah. Isaiah 16:7-8 refers to it as a Moabite city, as does Jeremiah 48:31-32. In one case it is called Sebam (Hebrew Sebam), spelled Shebam in the King James Version (Numbers 32:3). Its specific location is not known.

=== Sitnah ===
Sitnah was the name of the second of Abraham's wells reopened by Isaac in Genesis 26:21. In the Septuagint, its name is given as Ἐχθρία (echthria).

=== Stone of Bohan, son of Reuben ===
The stone of Bohan, son of Reuben is mentioned in Joshua 15:6 as a point along the boundary of the land allocated to the tribe of Judah. Bohan is not named as one of Reuben's sons where they are listed in Genesis 46:9. Bohan is a name which appears twice in the Hebrew Bible. In both cases it appears in the phrase "the stone of Bohan the son of Reuben," which refers to a place along the boundary between Judah and the Tribe of Benjamin.

=== Suphah ===
Suphah is mentioned in Numbers 21:14, quoting the lost Book of the Wars of the Lord, and is possibly the same as Suph.

== T ==
=== Tappuah ===
Tappuah, Hebrew for 'apple', and compounds thereof, are toponyms from the Book of Joshua:

- Beth-Tappuah, city in the hill country of Judah (Joshua 15:53), commonly identified with Taffuh, a Palestinian town in the West Bank, 4 miles west of Hebron.
- Tappuah, city in the lowland of Judah (Joshua 12:17, 15:34)
- Tappuah, capital of a Canaanite king defeated by Joshua. It was allotted to the powerful tribe of Ephraim, who first needed to capture the city. It stood in the eastern parts of its realm and on the border with Manasseh, who received the lands around it (Joshua 16:8, 17:8). It is usually identified with Tell esh-Sheikh Abu Zarad, 8 miles (13 km) south of Shechem and in the vicinity of modern Yasuf (identified with the Yashub of LXX and possibly of the Samaria Ostraca). Pottery found at Sheikh Abu Zarad was dated to the Late Bronze and Iron Ages. Encyclopaedia Judaica sees En-tappuah from Joshua 17:7 (see below) as being an alternative name for the city. A by now discarded identification with the site fortified by Bacchides was based on a misreading of Josephus (Ant., 13:15 / Whiston Book 13, Ch 1:3; 1 Maccabees 9:50): Bacchides fortified Theko (Tekoa), not Tepho (Tappuah).
- En-tappuah ('Tappuah Spring'), in the eastern parts of Manasseh on the border with Ephraim (Joshua 17:7); identified with the 'Ayn al-Tuffūḥ spring near the village of Yasuf. Considered to be an alternative name for the city of Tappuah in Efraim.
- Tiphsah, city captured by King Mehahem (2 Kings 15:16). In the Greek version though, the city is named as Tappuah, which would then be the one in Ephraim (see above).

=== Tatam ===
Tatam appears in the Septuagint version of Joshua 15:59-60.

=== Theco ===
Theco appears in the Septuagint version of Joshua 15:59-60.

=== Thether ===
Thether appears in the Septuagint version of Joshua 15:59-60.

=== Thobes ===
Thobes appears in the Septuagint version of Joshua 15:59-60.

== U ==
=== Uzzen-sherah ===
Uzzen-sherah (or Uzzen-sheerah) is the name of a town mentioned only in 1 Chronicles 7:24. It was named for its builder, Sherah, daughter of Ephraim. While it is believed to have been located close to Beth-horon, the exact location has not been identified.

== W ==
=== Well Lahairoi, the ===
See Beer-lahai-roi.

== Z ==
=== Zaphon ===
Zaphon (Hebrew: Tsaphonah, rendered Sephenia in some manuscripts of the Septuagint) is mentioned in Joshua 13:27 as a location within the territory of the tribe of Gad and in Judges 12:1 as the location where the Ephraimites met with Jephthah and his army to complain that Jephthah had fought the Ammonites without calling on the Ephraimites for military assistance. The Easy-to-Read Version calls it a "city". Some translations (e.g. the King James Version) render Tsaphonah as "northwards".

=== Zelzah ===
A place at the border of Benjamin, where two men were to meet Saul as a sign of his kingship, in 1 Samuel 10:2. This is the only mention of the place in the Bible, and its location is unidentified.

=== Zer ===
Zer, fortified city mentioned in Joshua 19:35 along with Ziddim, Hammath, Rakkath, and Chinnereth.

=== Zereda ===
Zereda(h) is the birthplace of Jeroboam, the first king of the northern Kingdom of Israel and the son of Nebat of the Tribe of Ephraim.

=== Ziz ===
The "ascent of Ziz" is the place where, according to 2 Chronicles 20:16, Jahaziel told Jehoshaphat to expect an invading army of Moabites, Ammonites, and Edomites to ascend in front of the wilderness of Jeruel.

== See also ==
- Cities in the Book of Joshua
- List of biblical places
- List of minor biblical figures
- List of minor biblical tribes
- List of modern names for biblical place names
