= Dovrat =

Dovrat, Daberath or דָּבְרַת could refer to:

- Daberath, ancient Levitical city in the Tribe of Issachar's territory

- Daburiyya, village in the Northern District, Israel; modern-day site of the ancient city
- Dovrat, Israel, kibbutz in the Northern District, Israel, named after the ancient city

- Dovrat van Ouwerkerk (born 1986), Israeli football striker
- Noam Dovrat (born 2002), Israeli basketball point guard and shooting guard
- Shlomo Dovrat, Israeli entrepreneur
