= Levitical city =

Cities in ancient Israel set aside for the tribe of Levi

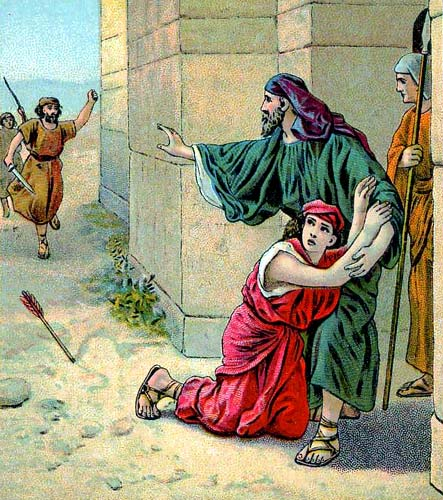
Cities of Refuge (illustration from a Bible card published 1901 by the Providence Lithograph Company)

In the Hebrew Bible, the Levitical cities were 48 cities in ancient Israel set aside for the tribe of Levi, who were not allocated their own territorial land when the Israelites entered the Promised Land.

Numbers 35:1-8 relates God's command to Moses to establish 48 cities for the Levites, of which six would also function as Cities of Refuge to which manslayers could flee. Each settlement was to comprise a walled city and the common land around it for pasture, measured radially as one thousand cubits (about 460 m (0.29 mi)) in each direction, or as a square measuring two thousand cubits (about 920 m (0.57 mi)) along each side. The land for the cities was to be "donated" by the host tribe and was allocated to the Levites according to their tribal sub-divisions.

13 cities were for the Aaronites.
13 cities were for the Gershonites.
10 cities were for the Kohathites.
12 cities were for the Merarites.

The six cities which were to be Cities of Refuge were Golan, Ramoth, and Bezer, on the east of the Jordan River, and Kedesh, Shechem, and Hebron on the western side.

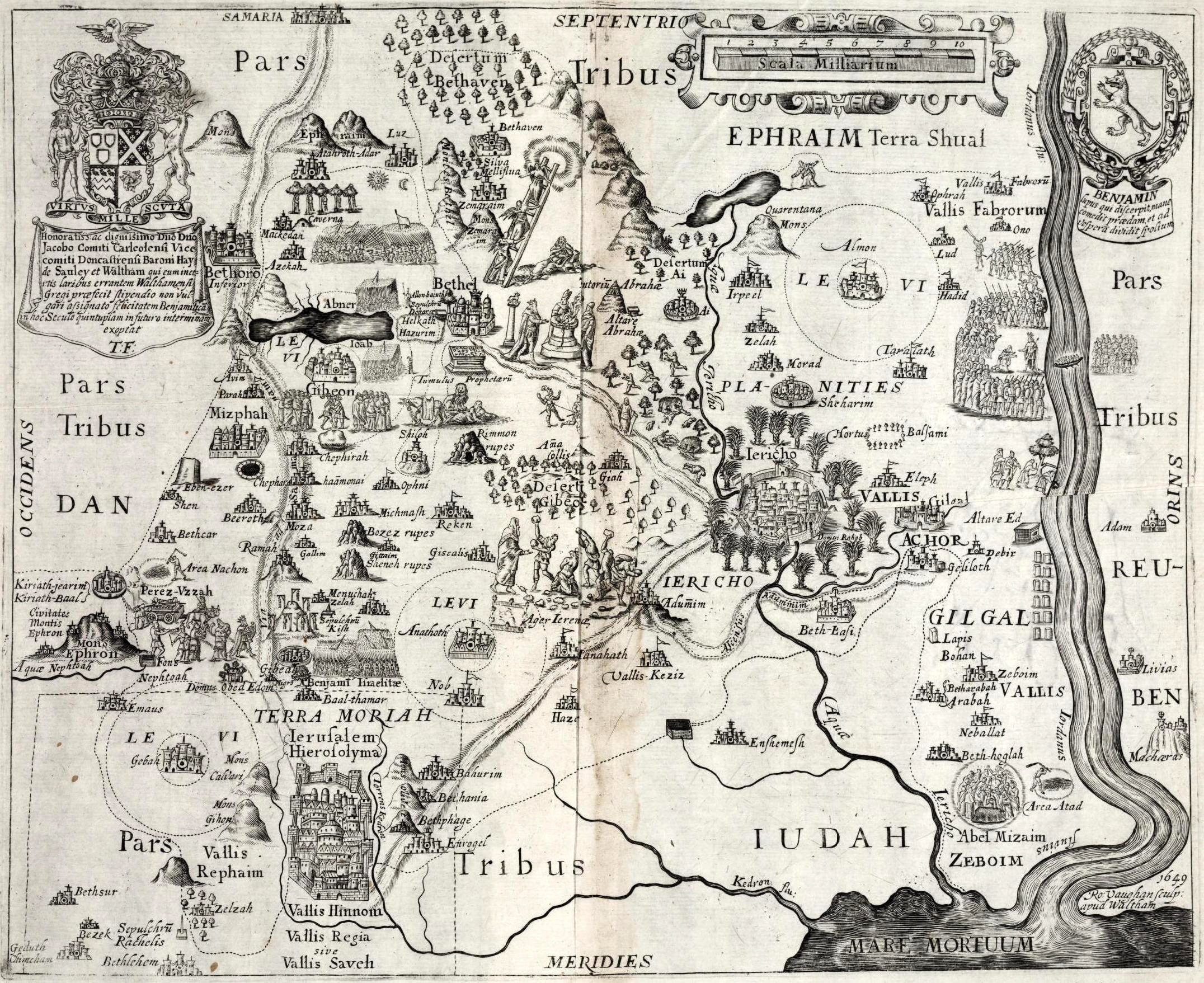
Map of the territory of Benjamin, with the Levitical cities of Almon, Anathoth, Geba and Gibeon circled with common land.

== Locations of Cities ==
Joshua 21 recounts the fulfilment of God's command at the request of the Levite leaders. A further list is provided in 1 Chronicles 6:54-81. The following table reflects the list in Joshua 21:

Tribe	Levitical cities	Levite division	City of refuge
Asher	Abdon	Gershonites	
Asher	Helkath	Gershonites	
Asher	Mishal	Gershonites	
Asher	Rehob	Gershonites	
Benjamin	Almon	Aaronites	
Benjamin	Anathoth	Aaronites	
Benjamin	Geba	Aaronites	
Benjamin	Gibeon	Aaronites	
Dan	Aijalon	Kohathites	
Dan	Eltekeh	Kohathites	
Dan	Gath Rimmon	Kohathites	
Dan	Gibbethon	Kohathites	
Ephraim	Beth Horon	Kohathites	
Ephraim	Gezer	Kohathites	
Ephraim	Kibzaim	Kohathites	
Ephraim	Shechem	Kohathites	♦
Gad	Ramoth-Gilead	Merarites	♦
Gad	Jazer	Merarites	
Gad	Mahanaim	Merarites	
Gad	Heshbon	Merarites	
Issachar	Daberath	Gershonites	
Issachar	En Gannim	Gershonites	
Issachar	Jarmuth	Gershonites	
Issachar	Kishion	Gershonites	
Judah	Ain	Aaronites	
Judah	Beth Shemesh	Aaronites	
Judah	Debir	Aaronites	
Judah	Eshtemoa	Aaronites	
Judah	Holon	Aaronites	
Judah	Jattir	Aaronites	
Judah	Juttah	Aaronites	
Judah	Kirjath Arba (Hebron)	Aaronites	♦
Judah	Libnah	Aaronites	
Manasseh	Be Eshterah	Gershonites	
Manasseh	Gath Rimmon	Kohathites	
Manasseh	Golan	Gershonites	♦
Manasseh	Tanach	Kohathites	
Naphtali	Hammoth-dor	Gershonites	
Naphtali	Kartan	Gershonites	
Naphtali	Kedesh in Galilee	Gershonites	♦
Reuben	Bezer	Merarites	♦
Reuben	Jahaz	Merarites	
Reuben	Kedemoth	Merarites	
Reuben	Mephaath	Merarites	
Simeon	See Judah (above)		
Zebulun	Dimnah	Merarites	
Zebulun	Jokneam	Merarites	
Zebulun	Kartah	Merarites	
Zebulun	Nahalal	Merarites	

== Interpretation ==
John Calvin suggested that the Levites had initially been "overlooked" in the allocation of land on entry to the Promised Land, until the Levites brought forward a reminder of the divine commandment, making this an example of how:

... it is apt to happen, every one being so attentive in looking after his own affairs that even brethren are forgotten. It was certainly disgraceful to the people that they required to be pulled by the ear, and put in mind of what the Lord had clearly ordered respecting the Levites.

However, the writer of the Pulpit Commentary disagreed:

We are not to suppose, with Calvin, that the Levites had been overlooked. Such a supposition is little in keeping with the devout spirit of him who now directed the affairs of the Israelites, who had been minister to Moses the Levite, and had but lately been concerned with Eleazar, the high priest, in making a public recognition of that God to whose service the Levites had been specially set apart. The delay in appointing to the Levites their cities arose from the nature of the arrangement which had to be made for the Levitical cities.

This "arrangement" was the fulfilment of Jacob's prophecy in Genesis 49:5-7 - I will scatter them (Simeon and Levi) in Israel - which was a punishment for Simeon and Levi's massacre of the men of Shechem. The Levites could not be scattered amongst the cities of the other tribes until the other tribes had all been appointed to their territories after the entry into the Promised Land (Joshua 18–19).

Matthew Henry commented that Jacob's condemnation of Levi became a blessing for Israel:

The sentence as it respects Levi was turned into a blessing. This tribe performed an acceptable service in their zeal against the worshippers of the golden calf (Exodus 32:26). Being set apart to God as priests, they were in that character scattered through the nation of Israel.
