= Asylum (antiquity) =

Place of refuge in antiquity

In ancient Greece and Rome, an asylum was a place where people facing persecution could seek refuge. These locations were largely religious in nature, such as temples and other religious sites. A similar concept, the Cities of Refuge, existed in the ancient Levant.

== Ancient Israel and Judah ==
The Cities of Refuge were certain Levitical towns in the Kingdom of Israel and the Kingdom of Judah in which the perpetrators of accidental manslaughter could claim the right of asylum, though he would still have to stand trial. Outside of these cities, blood vengeance against such perpetrators was allowed by law. The Bible names six cities as being cities of refuge: Golan, Ramoth, and Bosor, on the east of the Jordan River, and Kedesh, Shechem, and Hebron on the western side. There is also an instance of Adonijah, after a failed coup, seeking refuge from the newly anointed Solomon by grasping the horns of a sacrificial altar.

== Ancient Greece ==
In ancient Greece the temples, altars, sacred groves, and statues of the gods generally possessed the privileges of protecting slaves, debtors, and criminals, who fled to them for refuge. The laws, however, do not appear to have recognised the right of all such sacred places to afford the protection which was claimed, but to have confined it to a certain number of temples, or altars, which were considered in a more especial manner to have the asylia (Servius ad Virg. Aen. ii. 761.).

There were several places in Athens which possessed this privilege, of which the best known was the Theseum, or temple of Theseus, in the city, which was chiefly intended for the protection of the ill-treated slaves, who could take refuge in this place, and compel their masters to sell them to some other person (Plut. Theseus, 36; Schol. ad Aristoph. Equit. 1309; Hesych. and Suidas, s.v.).

The other places in Athens which possessed the jus asyli ("right of asylum") were: the Altar of Pity, in the Agora, the altar of Zeus Ayopcuos, the Altar of the Twelve Gods, the altar of the Eumenides on the Areopagus, the Theseum in the Piraeus, and the altar of Artemis, at Munichia (Meier, Alt. Proc. p. 404). Among the most celebrated places of asylum in other parts of Greece, there are the temple of Poseidon in Laconia, on Mount Taenarus (Time. i. 128, 133; Corn. Nep. Pans. c. 4); the temple of Poseidon in Calauria (Pint. Demosth. 29); and the temple of Athena Alea in Tegea (Paus. iii. 5. § 6).

It would appear, however, that all sacred places were supposed to protect an individual to a certain extent, even if their right to do so was not recognised by the laws of the state, in which they were situated. In such cases, however, as the law gave no protection, it seems to have been considered lawful to use any means in order to compel the individuals who had taken refuge to leave the sanctuary, except dragging them out by personal violence. Thus it was not uncommon to force a person from an altar or a statue of a god, by the application of fire. (Eurip. Androm. 256, with Schol.; Plant. Mostett. v. 1. 65.) Incidents of violation of asylum include the deaths of Cylon of Athens and Pausanias of Sparta. The 464 BC Sparta earthquake has been viewed by the contemporaries as divine vengeance for the Spartan ephors' murder of helots in violation of the asylum in the Tainaron temple.

In ancient Greece the term asylia was also applied to the security from plunder and piracy (asylia on land and sea), which was sometimes granted by one state to another, or even to single individuals (See Bb'ckh, Corp. Inscrip. i. p. 725.).

== Ancient Rome ==
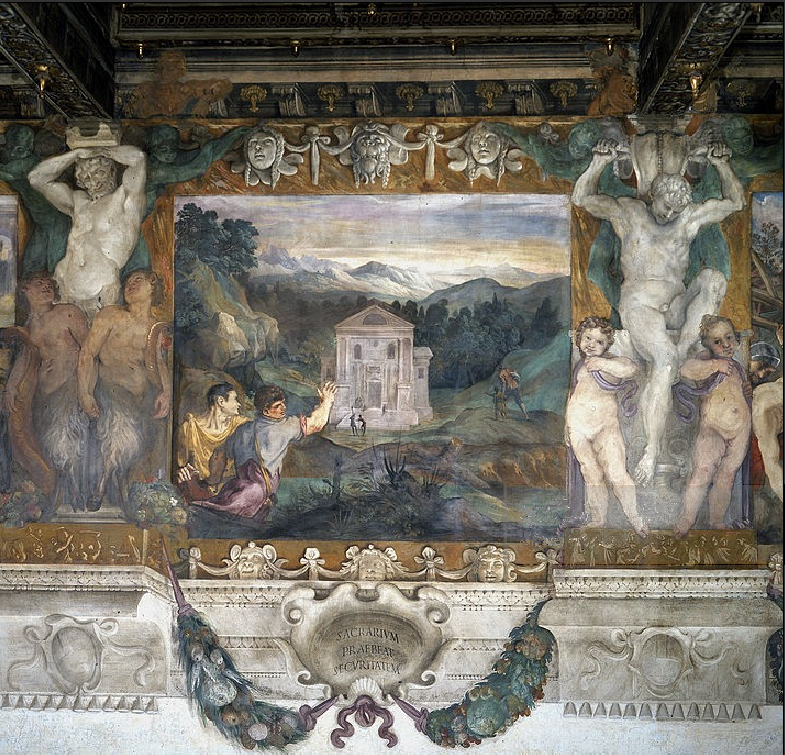
An ahistorical fresco imagining refugees seeking the asylum of Romulus, from the founding of Rome frieze in the elaborate architectural setting of the Palazzo Magnani, Bologna (late 16th century)

The asylum (temple of the god Asylaeus) that Romulus is said to have opened at Rome on the Capitoline Hill, between its two summits, in order to increase the population of the city was, according to the legend, a place of refuge for the inhabitants of other states, rather than a sanctuary for those who had violated the laws of the city. In the republican and early imperial times, a right of asylum, such as existed in the Greek states, does not appear to have been recognised by Roman law. Livy seems to speak of the right of asylum as peculiar to the Greeks.

By a constitutio of Antoninus Pius, it was decreed that if a slave in a province fled to the temples of the gods or the statues of the emperors to avoid the ill-usage of his master, the praeses could compel the master to sell the slave, and the slave was not regarded by the law as a runaway (fugitivus). This constitutio of Antoninus is quoted in Justinian's Institutes (1. tit. 8. s. 2), with a slight alteration; the words ad aedem sacram are substituted for ad fana deorum, since the jus asyli was in his time extended to churches.

Those slaves who took refuge at the statue of an emperor were considered to inflict disgrace on their master, as it was reasonably supposed that no slave would take such a step, unless he had received very bad usage from his master. If it could be proved that any individual had instigated the slave of another to flee to the statue of an emperor, he was liable to an action corrupti servi. The right of asylum seems to have been generally, but not entirely, confined to slaves.

In the time of Tiberius, the number of places possessing the jus asyli in the cities in Greece and Asia Minor became so numerous as to seriously impede the administration of justice. In consequence of this, the Roman Senate, by the command of the emperor, limited the jus asyli to a few cities, but did not entirely abolish it, as Suetonius (Tiberius 37) has erroneously stated.

== Ancient Hawai'i ==
In the culture of ancient Hawai'i, certain places were designated pu'uhonua, which has been translated "place of refuge". A pu'uhonua was a sanctuary; a criminal who had violated the strict kapu code, or a defeated warrior or a non-combatant in a war could take shelter in a pu'uhonua, free from reprisal. Anyone, no matter their social status or crime, was free to enter, if they could reach the site before being overtaken by their pursuers. The resident priests would put to death anyone who pursued someone into the sanctuary. After being purified by a priest, the person was then free to leave, absolved of any crime.

One of the best preserved pu'uhonua is Pu'uhonua o Honaunau on the island of Hawai'i. It was the largest walled pu'uhonua in Hawai'i and was used for the longest period of time. Here a heiau (temple) preserved the bones of Keawe, a great chief who died c. 1725 and was later believed to be a god. His mana (spiritual power) was believed to protect the area. Each pu'uhonua was similarly protected by a deified ancestor.

After unifying the islands in 1810, Kamehameha the Great abolished most of the pu'uhonua and established new ones, although the one at Honaunau was untouched. The kapu system itself was officially abolished in a taboo-breaking ceremony by King Kamehameha II and his court in 1819, after which the importance of pu'uhonua declined, since there was no longer a need for their powers of absolution.

== See also ==
- Right of asylum
- Safe house
- Sanctuary cities
- Sanctuary movement
- Cities of Refuge
