= Hammoth-dor =

Hammoth-dor (or Emathdor; Hebrew: חַמֹּת דֹּאר) is a walled city mentioned in the Book of Joshua (21:32). It is mentioned in the same verse as Shechem, a city of refuge within the allotment of Naftali, and was given to the Gershonite Levites.

W. M. Christie concluded it is identical with Hammon which appears in the Book of Chronicles in a similar context (6:61), and probably with Hammath (Joshua 21:35). Ewing, and Easton's Bible Dictionary identify it with the present Hamat Tiberias. Eerdmans Bible Dictionary tentatively agrees on the ancient alternative names, and suggest as location either Hamat Tiberias or Tell Raqqat (Hebrew: תל רקת; also Tell al-Qunitria Arabic: تل القنيطرية), north of Tiberias.

== See also ==
- Hama (disambiguation)
