= Hammon (city) =

Chronicles of Hammon

Hammon (Hebrew: חַמּוֹן) is a city mentioned in the Book of Chronicles (6:76). It is related it was within the allotment of Naftali, and given to the Gershonite Levites. William Ewing concluded it is identical with Hammath which appears in the Book of Joshua in a similar context (Joshua 19:35), and probably also with Hammoth-dor (Joshua 21:32). Ewing, Smith's Bible Dictionary and Easton's Bible Dictionary identify it with the present Hamat Tiberias. Eerdmans Bible Dictionary tentatively agrees on the ancient alternative names, and suggest as location either Hamat Tiberias or Tell Raqqat (Hebrew: תל רקת; also Tell al-Qunitria Arabic: تل القنيطرية), north of Tiberias.

== See also ==
- Hama (disambiguation)
