= Kibzaim =

Kibzaim, or Cibsaim in the Douai-Rheims translation of the Hebrew Bible, Hebrew: קִבְצַ֙יִם֙, (word 6911 in Strong's Concordance, meaning "two heaps" from the Hebrew word qabats, to gather, collect) was a Levitical city of Ephraim, assigned to the Kohathite Levites (Joshua 21:22).

It was also called Jokmeam (1 Chronicles 6:68), but in the Book of Joshua, 'Jokneam' was one of the cities of Naphtali given to the Merarites.
