= Daburiyya =

Local council in Israel's Northern District

Daburiyya: דַבּוּרִיָּה, דבורייה; دبورية
- Local council (from 1961)

Hebrew transcription(s)
  - ISO 259: Dabburiya
  - Also spelled: Deburieh (unofficial)
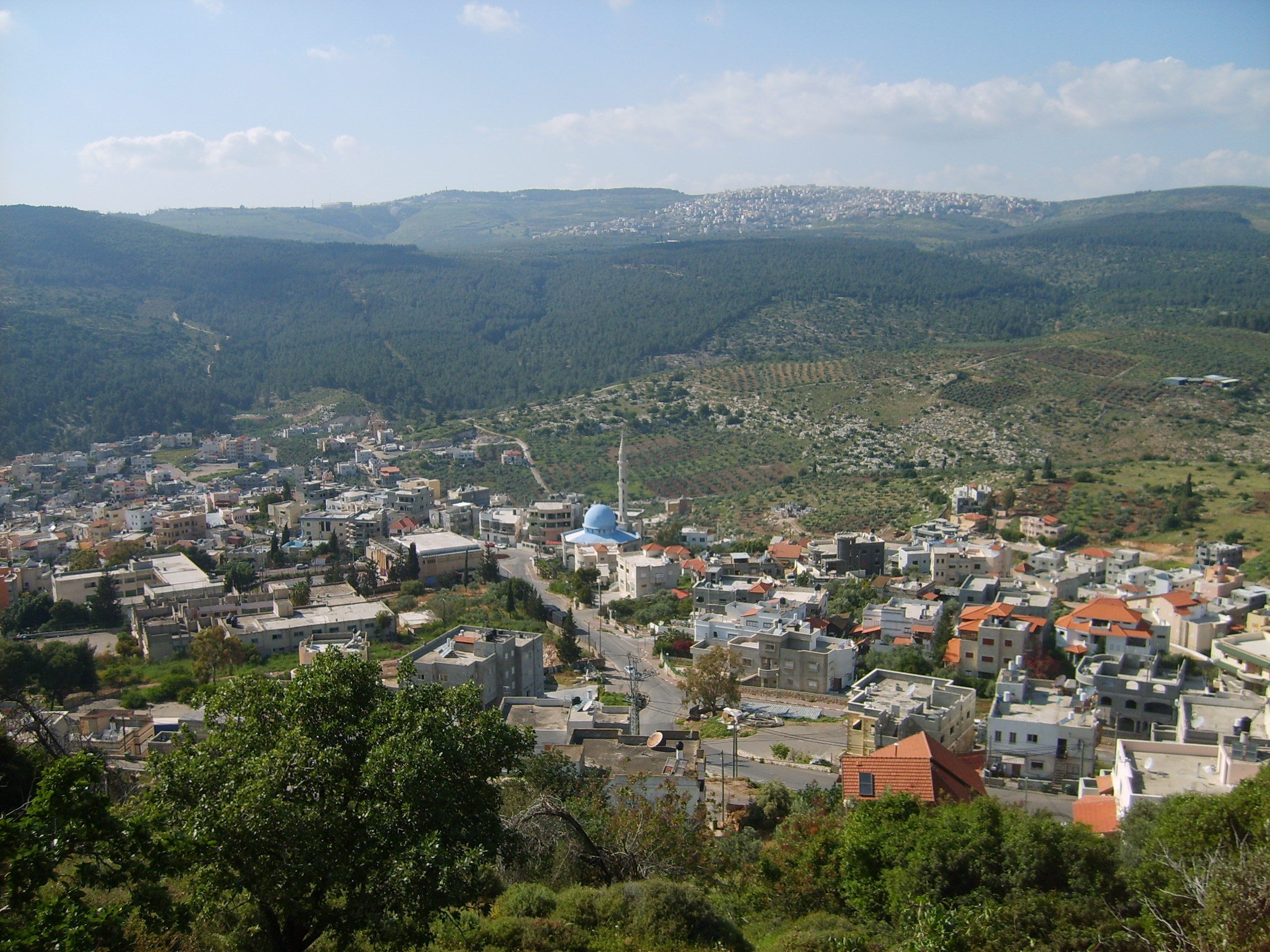

- Location within Israel Location within Jezreel Valley region of Israel
- Coordinates: 32°41′31″N 35°22′18″E
- Grid position: 185/232 PAL
- Country: Israel
- District: Northern
- Subdistrict: Jezreel
- Natural Region: Nazareth-Tir'an Mountains

Area
  - Total: 7,200 dunams (7.2 km^{2}; 2.8 sq mi)

Population (2024)
  - Total: 10,830
  - Density: 1,500/km^{2} (3,900/sq mi)

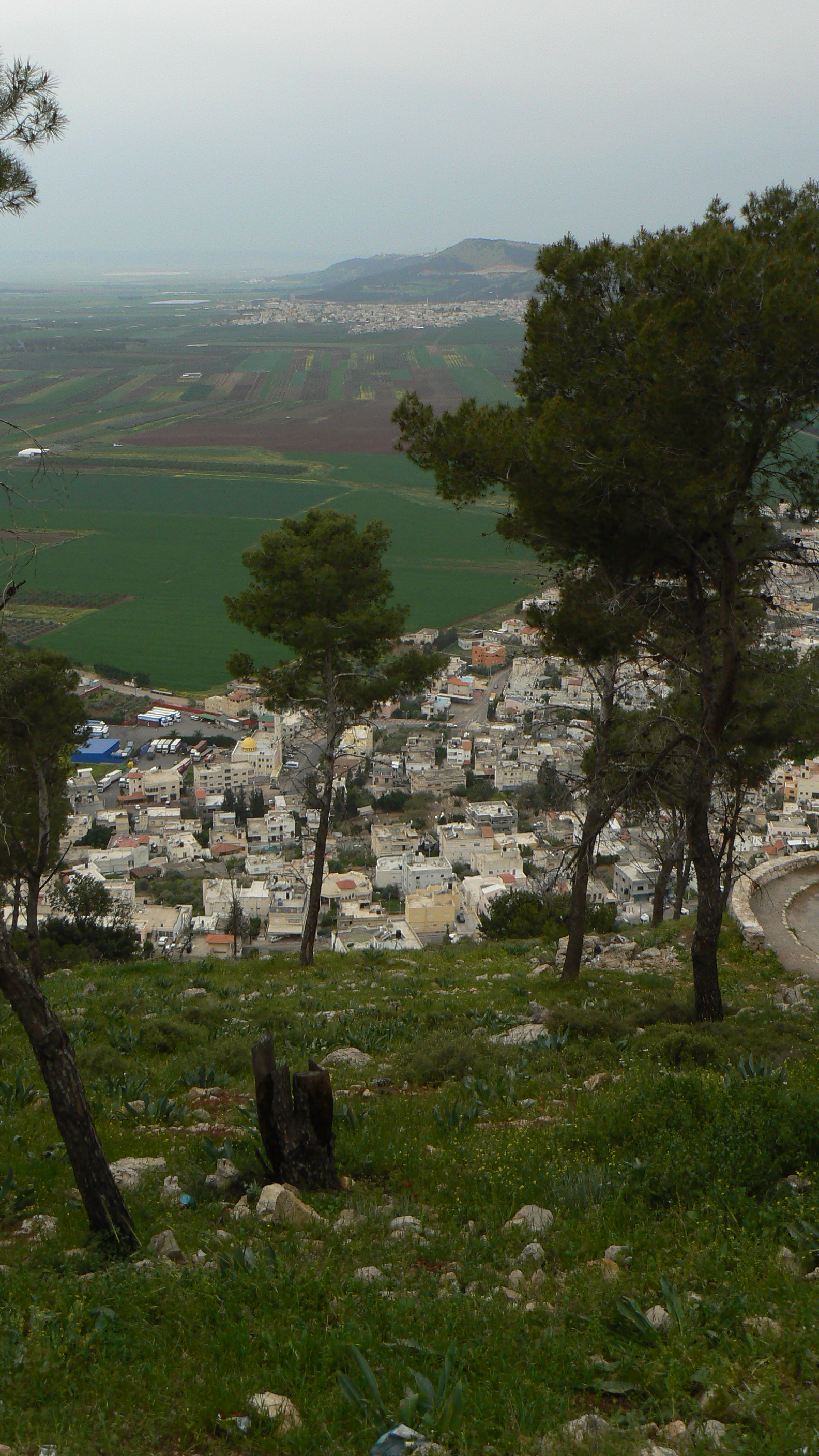
View of Daburiyya

Daburiyya (Arabic: دبورية; Hebrew: דַבּוּרִיָּה), also Deburieh or Dabburieh, is an Arab local council around 8 kilometres (5.0 mi) east of Nazareth in Israel's Northern District. Daburriya gained local council status in 1961. Its jurisdiction extends over 7,200 dunams. In 2024 it had a population of 10,830; 99.8% of the population was Muslim and 0.2% was Christian.

Daburiyya is located off of Highway 65 at the foot of Mount Tabor in the Lower Galilee, near the area where the prophetess Deborah judged.

== History ==
Daburiyya is identified with the biblical city of Daberath (also spelled Davrat), which in Joshua 21:28 and in the Book of Chronicles was allotted to the tribe of Issachar, who gave it as a Levitical city to the Levites.

Minor archaeological surveys, salvage and trial digs conducted in the village, including some in 2004 and 2006, uncovered pottery and other fragmentary remains from the Iron Age to the Ottoman period. The 2000s digs brought to light ceramic from the Iron Age, Hellenistic, Roman, Byzantine, Umayyad and Mamluk periods, sparse building remains from the Late Roman or Byzantine period, and a probable terrace wall datable to the Middle Bronze Age and/or the Roman period, as well as rock-cut installations such as winepresses and cupmarks.

=== Classical period ===
During the Hellenistic and Roman periods, the Greek name of the place was Dabráth or Dabiroth and its Latin name was Dabareth. Josephus called it Dabarittha (Greek: Δαβαρίθθων, "Dabarithon").

During the first year of the Great Jewish Revolt, in 66 CE, a group of young men from Dabaritta ambushed Ptolemy, the financial overseer of King Agrippa II, and his sister Berenice, stealing valuable items including rich robes, silver goblets, and gold coins. They brought the loot to Josephus in Tarichaeae, expecting praise, but Josephus reprimanded them, intending to return the stolen goods to Agrippa, which led the young men to accuse Josephus of treachery and incite disturbances against him.

In the early 4th-century CE Onomasticon, Eusebius refers to the place as Dabeira and Dabrath, and describes it as "a village of Jews".

Daburiyya has been identified by some with the locality of Helenopolis of the Roman-Byzantine period, but Helenopolis is more commonly identified with Kafr Kama or another town or region.

=== Crusaders ===
After being part of the Crusader Kingdom of Jerusalem, Daburiyya was retaken by Saladin in 1187 and a mosque, possibly built above an old Crusader tower, has an inscription above the entrance stating that it was built in AH 610 (1214 CE) by the Damascus-based Ayyubid ruler al-Mu'azzam 'Isa. What was interpreted as remains of a Crusader church could still be seen in the 18th century in the center of Daburiyya.

=== Ottoman Empire ===
In 1517, the village was incorporated into the Ottoman Empire with the rest of Palestine, and in 1596 Dabburiya appeared in the Ottoman tax registers as being in the nahiya (subdistrict) of Tabariyya under Safad Sanjak, with a population of 40 households and 3 bachelors, all Muslim. They paid a fixed tax rate of 25% on agricultural products, including wheat and barley, fruit trees, cotton, as well as on goats and/or beehives; a total of 5,500 akçe.

The village was mentioned as 'Debourah' by Richard Pococke during his visit to the area in 1737. He noted it lay on raised ground at the western foot of Mount Tabor and contained a ruined church. A map from Napoleon's invasion of 1799 by Pierre Jacotin showed the place, named as Dabouri.

==== 19th century ====
In 1838, it was noted as a Muslim village in the Nazareth district. It was found "small and unimportant", with the visible ruins of a Christian church.

Victor Guérin visited in the 1875, and noted "Among the houses may be remarked the remains of an ancient edifice, measuring twenty-two paces in length by ten in breadth, and built from west to east. It was once constructed of cut stones and a certain number of courses are still standing. The interior is now occupied by a private house and a stable, above which rises the medafeh—a house set apart for strangers. In all probability this was a Christian Church."

In 1881, the PEF's Survey of Western Palestine (SWP) described Deburieh as "A small village built of stone, with inhabited caves; contains about 200 Moslems and is surrounded by gardens of figs and olives. It is situated on the slope of the hill. Water is obtained from cisterns in the village." A population list from about 1887 showed that ed Deburieh had about 300 inhabitants; all Muslims.

=== British Mandate ===
In the 1922 census of Palestine, conducted by the British Mandate authorities, Dabburieh had a total population of 602, all Muslim, which had increased in the 1931 census to 747; 728 Muslims and 19 Christians, in a total of 170 houses.

In the 1945 statistics the population was 1,290, 1,260 Muslims and 30 Christians, with 13,373 dunams of land, according to an official land and population survey. Of this, 723 dunams were for plantations and irrigable land, 12,581 for cereals, while 65 dunams were built-up land.

=== Israel ===
In 2008 and 2009 Daburiyya High School received the National Education Award, achieving second and third place. It was the first time that a school in Israel has won the award twice in a row. The principal, Abed Elsalam Masalcha, attributed the positive developments in the school to the introduction of a Transcendental Meditation program which solved student discipline problems.

In 2009 the Israeli Education Ministry said it would shut down the town's high school of sciences, which had 210 students that year, because it was operating without a permit. The school, located in a building intended for a housing project, specialized in biology, physics, chemistry and computer science and had a 100% matriculation success rate. It was a branch of the I'billin-based Mar Elias School. According to the local parents' association, the school was opened because the local high school had become "chaotic and the police needed to frequently intervene between students."

== Demographics ==
Historical population
Year	Pop.	±%
1972	3,100	—
1983	4,500	+45.2%
1995	6,300	+40.0%
2008	8,900	+41.3%
2022	10,480	+17.8%
2024	10,830	+3.3%

== Voting Patterns ==
In the 2022 election, 97 percent of voters in Daburiyya voted for the Arab parties, while 2 percent voted for the parties of the center-left coalition led by Yair Lapid and 1 percent voted for the parties of the right-wing coalition led by Benjamin Netanyahu. Among the voters for the Arab parties, 36 percent voted for the Hadash–Ta'al list, while 35 percent voted for Balad and 29 percent voted for Ra'am.

In the 2026 election, 97 percent of voters in Daburiyya voted for the Arab parties, while 2 percent voted for the parties of the center-left coalition led by Gadi Eisenkot and 0.2 percent voted for the parties of the right-wing coalition led by Benjamin Netanyahu. Among the voters for the Arab parties, 75 percent voted for the Joint List, while 25 percent voted for Ra'am. Voter turnout increased 58 percent from the 2022 election.

== See also ==
- Arab localities in Israel

== Bibliography ==
- Abel, F.M. (1938). Geographie de la Palestine. Vol. 2 Geographie Politique. Les villes. Librairie Lecoffre.
- Abu Raya, Rafeh (2009-04-30). "Dabburiya Final Report". Hadashot Arkheologiyot – Excavations and Surveys in Israel (121).
- Barron, J.B., ed. (1923). Palestine: Report and General Abstracts of the Census of 1922. Government of Palestine.
- Conder, C.R.; Kitchener, H.H. (1881). The Survey of Western Palestine: Memoirs of the Topography, Orography, Hydrography, and Archaeology. Vol. 1. London: Committee of the Palestine Exploration Fund. p 366
- Daniel, Zohar (2010-02-22). "Dabburiya Final Report". Hadashot Arkheologiyot – Excavations and Surveys in Israel (122).
- Government of Palestine, Department of Statistics (1945). Village Statistics, April, 1945.
- Guérin, V. (1880). Description Géographique Historique et Archéologique de la Palestine (in French). Vol. 3: Galilee, pt. 1. Paris: L'Imprimerie Nationale.
- Hadawi, S. (1970). Village Statistics of 1945: A Classification of Land and Area ownership in Palestine. Palestine Liberation Organization Research Center.
- Hanna, Butros (2011-12-29). "Dabburiya Final Report". Hadashot Arkheologiyot – Excavations and Surveys in Israel (123).
- Hanna, Butros (2012-12-31). "Dabburiya, Har Devora, Survey Final Report". Hadashot Arkheologiyot – Excavations and Surveys in Israel (124).
- Hütteroth, W.-D.; Abdulfattah, K. (1977). Historical Geography of Palestine, Transjordan and Southern Syria in the Late 16th Century. Erlanger Geographische Arbeiten, Sonderband 5. Erlangen, Germany: Vorstand der Fränkischen Geographischen Gesellschaft. ISBN 3-920405-41-2.
- Karmon, Y. (1960). "An Analysis of Jacotin's Map of Palestine" (PDF). Israel Exploration Journal. 10 (3, 4): 155–173, 244–253. Archived from the original (PDF) on 2018-09-28.
- Keil, C.F. (1857). Commentary on the Book of Joshua. T. & T. Clark.
- Le Strange, G. (1890). Palestine Under the Moslems: A Description of Syria and the Holy Land from A.D. 650 to 1500. Committee of the Palestine Exploration Fund. (p. 427)
- Mills, E., ed. (1932). Census of Palestine 1931. Population of Villages, Towns and Administrative Areas. Jerusalem: Government of Palestine.
- Negev, Avraham; Shimon, Gibson (2001). Archaeological Ecyclopedia of the Holy Land. New York, London: The Continuum Publishing Group. ISBN 9780826485717.
- Palmer, E.H. (1881). The Survey of Western Palestine: Arabic and English Name Lists Collected During the Survey by Lieutenants Conder and Kitchener, R. E. Transliterated and Explained by E.H. Palmer. Committee of the Palestine Exploration Fund.
- Petersen, Andrew (2001). A Gazetteer of Buildings in Muslim Palestine (British Academy Monographs in Archaeology). Vol. 1. Oxford University Press. ISBN 978-0-19-727011-0.
- Petersen, Andrew (2005). The Towns of Palestine under Muslim Rule AD 600–1600. Archaeopress.
- Pococke, R. (1745). A description of the East, and some other countries. Vol. 2. London: Printed for the author, by W. Bowyer.
- Pringle, D. (1993). The Churches of the Crusader Kingdom of Jerusalem: A-K (excluding Acre and Jerusalem). Vol. I. Cambridge University Press. ISBN 0-521-39036-2.
- Pringle, D. (1997). Secular buildings in the Crusader Kingdom of Jerusalem: an archaeological Gazetter. Cambridge University Press. ISBN 0521-46010-7.
- RHC Or: Recueil des historiens des croisades : Historiens orientaux (in French). Vol. 4. Paris: Imprimerie nationale. 1898.
- Rhode, H. (1979). Administration and Population of the Sancak of Safed in the Sixteenth Century. Columbia University. Archived from the original on 2020-03-01.
- Robinson, E.; Smith, E. (1841). Biblical Researches in Palestine, Mount Sinai and Arabia Petraea: A Journal of Travels in the year 1838. Vol. 3. Boston: Crocker & Brewster.
- Schumacher, G. (1888). "Population list of the Liwa of Akka". Quarterly Statement - Palestine Exploration Fund. 20: 169–191.
- Sharon, M. (2004). Corpus Inscriptionum Arabicarum Palaestinae, D-F. Vol. 3. BRILL. ISBN 90-04-13197-3.
- Tsafrir, Y.; Leah Di Segni; Judith Green (1994). (TIR): Tabula Imperii Romani: Judaea, Palaestina. Jerusalem: Israel Academy of Sciences and Humanities. ISBN 965-208-107-8.
- Wilson, C.W., ed. (c. 1881). Picturesque Palestine, Sinai and Egypt. Vol. 2. New York: D. Appleton. (p. 44)
