= Merarites =

Division among the Levites in Biblical times

The Merarites were one of the four main divisions among the Levites in Biblical times. The Bible claims that the Merarites were all descended from the eponymous Merari, a son of Levi, although some biblical scholars regard this as a postdictional metaphor, providing an origin myth of the connectedness of the clan to others in the Israelite confederation.

The Bible ascribes a specific religious function to the Merarites, namely care of the framework - posts, crossbars, courtyard, tent pegs, etc. - of the sanctuary. This differentiation of religious activity between the Merarites and other Levites, in particular the Aaronids, is found only in the Priestly Code, and not in passages that textual scholars attribute to other authors.

According to the Book of Joshua, rather than possessing a continuous territory, the Merarites possessed several cities scattered throughout the geographic region of Gilead, as well as in the south of the Galilee, the latter being quite unrealistically distant from the former:

- in the territory of Reuben: Bezer, Jahazah, Kedemoth, and Mephaath
- in the territory of Gad: Ramoth (in Gilead), Mahanaim, Heshbon, and Jazer
- in the territory of Zebulun: Yokneam, Kartah, Dimnah, and Nahalal

The narrative in Joshua argues that the territory was taken by the Levites right after Joshua's conquest of Canaan, but this is contradicted not only by archaeological evidence, but also by narratives in the Book of Judges, Books of Samuel, and Books of Kings. The conclusion of most biblical scholars is thus that the whole system of Levite cities, in the Torah and deuteronomic history, is an attempt to explain the fact that important early sanctuaries existed at these locations, and thus were places where members of the priesthood naturally came to reside in large numbers. Scholars believe that the priesthood was originally open to any tribe, but gradually became seen as a distinct tribe to themselves - the Levites.

== See also ==
- Gershonites
- Kohathites
