= Jazer =

Biblical city

Jazer (or Jaazer) was a city east of the Jordan River, in or near Gilead, inhabited by the Amorites. It was taken by a special expedition sent by Moses to conquer it towards the end of the Israelites' Exodus journey from Egypt. From the Septuagint (which reads Ἰαζήρ for עז in Numbers xxi. 24) it appears that Jazer was on the border of Ammon. As an important city it gave its name to the whole of the surrounding territory—a "Sea of Jazer" is mentioned in Jeremiah xlviii. 32.

Jazer is stated to have been a fertile land fit for the raising of cattle and a place having many vineyards. It was occupied by the children of Gad, by which tribe it was allotted as a Levitical city to the Merarite Levites. In the time of David it seems to have been occupied by the Hebronites, who were descendants of Kohath. It was chosen as one of the stations by David's officers who were sent to number the children of Israel.

According to 1 Maccabees and Josephus (paraphrasing 1 Maccabees, most likely), Jazer was captured and burned by Judas Maccabeus during the Maccabee campaigns of 163 BC. The site of Jazer was defined by Eusebius and Jerome as being 8 or 10 Roman miles west of Philadelphia, and 15 miles north of Heshbon, and as the source of a large river falling into the Jordan. It is identified by some scholars with the modern Khirbet es-Sar on the road from Iraq al-Amir to Al-Salt; but this identification has been rejected by Cheyne.

== See also ==
- Isaiah 16
