= Gershonites =

Division among the Levites in Biblical times

The Gershonites were one of the four main divisions among the Levites in Biblical times. The Bible claims that the Gershonites were all descended from the eponymous Gershon a son of Levi (not to be confused with Moses' son Gershom), although some biblical scholars regard this as a postdictional metaphor providing an aetiology of the connectedness of the clan to others in the Israelite confederation.

The Bible lists 2 major family divisions of the Gershonites, the Libnites and the Shimeites (Numbers 3:21).

The Bible ascribes a specific religious function to the Gershonites, namely care of the curtains, hangings, and ropes of the sanctuary. This differentiation of religious activity between the Gershonites and other Levites, in particular the Aaronids, is found only in the Priestly Code, and not in passages that textual scholars attribute to other authors.

According to the Book of Joshua, rather than possessing a continuous territory, the Gershonites possessed several cities scattered throughout the geographic regions of Galilee and Bashan:

- in the territory of Manasseh: Golan, and Beeshterah
- in the territory of Issachar: Kishon, Dabareh, Jarmuth, and Anem
- in the territory of Asher: Mishal, Abdon, Helkath, and Rehob
- in the territory of Naphtali: Kedesh, Hammoth-dor, and Kartan

== See also ==
- Kohathites
- Merarites
- Aaronites
