= Anem (ancient city) =

Anem or Anim was a Levitical city in Israel allocated to the Gershonites, according to the Hebrew Bible, from the land of the tribe of Issachar (1 Chronicles 6:73) (6:58 in some Bibles). In the parallel location in the Book of Joshua, the name En-gannim or Engannim appears, and the two names may refer to the same town. William F. Albright suggested that Anem was the same location as En-gannim, the two spellings being variants of a single original site ʕen-ʕonam. But Hagen Martino (in 1907), claimed that Anem is 'probably a distinct site', near En-gannim.

The location of Anem is unknown. The modern settlement Ganim, near Jenin, was named after the biblical Anem.

== See also ==
- Gina (Canaan)
- For the two locations named En-gannim, one of which may be the same location as Anem, see List of minor biblical places#En-gannim
