= Bezer =

Bezer was a Levitical city in the desert plateau east of the Jordan, and of Heshbon, initially a resting place for travelers. It was designated by Moses as a "city of refuge", a "safe-haven" for Reubenites and others, to which any person guilty of manslaughter could flee to avoid being killed in vengeance.

The site of Bezer "cannot be located with certainty", although several sites have been proposed.

The Bible rarely mentions Bezer, but it explains the town's purpose as a refuge in Deuteronomy 4:43, Joshua 20:8, Joshua 21:36 (The usual, dutiful repetition - "to be a city of refuge for the slayer" - that follows the names of the other five cities of refuge, is actually omitted for Bezer in this verse in some translations.), 1 Chronicles 6:63 and 1 Chronicles 7:37.

Cities of refuge were necessary because the next of kin of a manslaughter victim had a right under the Law of Moses to seek compensation - in kind - for blood shed by the perpetrator.

The law of Moses provided that anyone accused of homicide could flee to a city of refuge, to be protected from the victim's family. Once he was there, a manslaughterer was prohibited from leaving until the high priest had died or until his own death, even if the victim's family had forgiven them.
