= Khirbet es-Sar =

Archaeological site in central Jordan

- Khirbat Sara, Khirbet es-Sar, Khirbet Sarah, Khirbet Sara
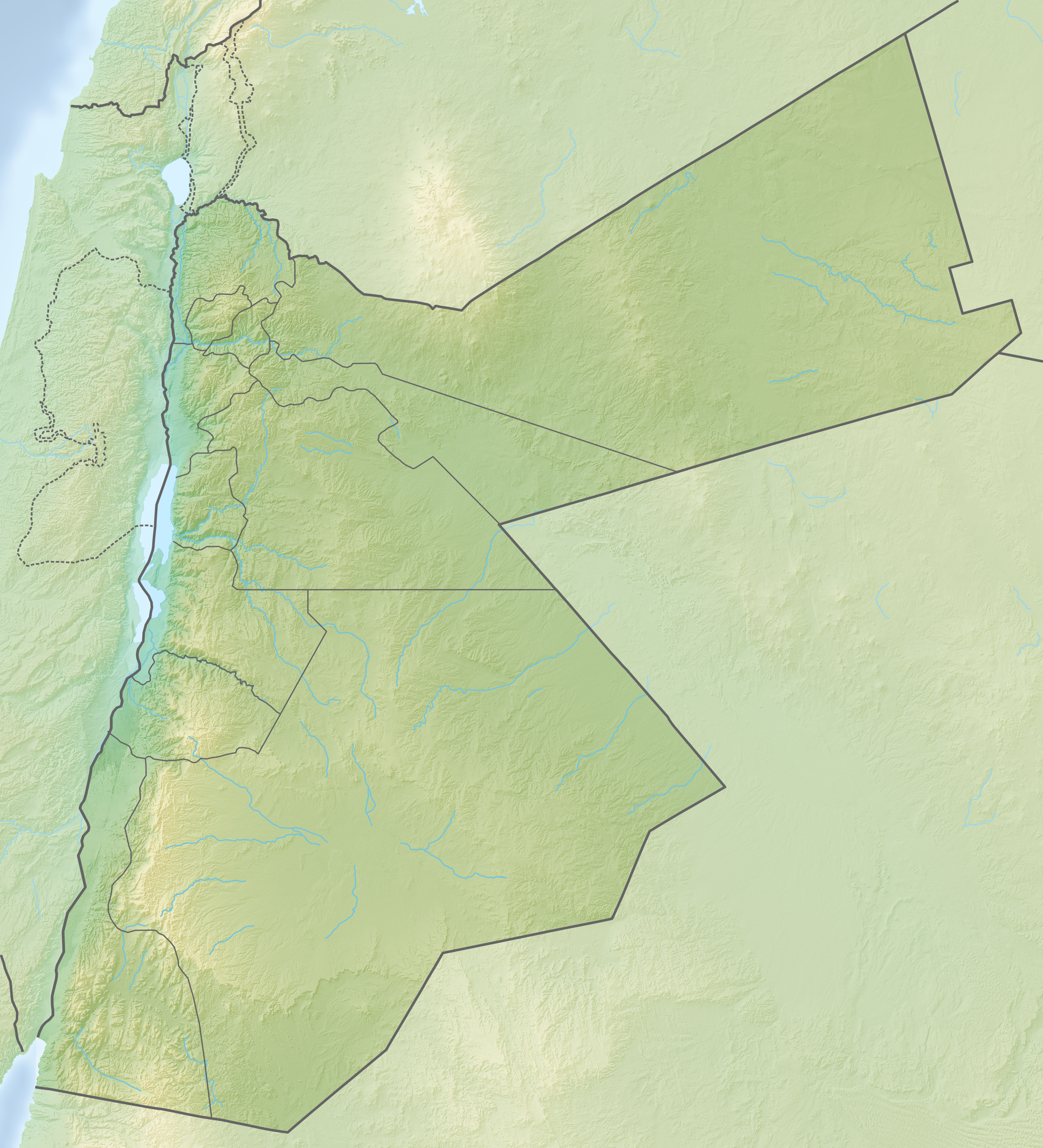
- Location within Jordan
- 31°56′40″N 35°49′48″E
- Type: Settlement, sanctuary, defensive site(?)
- Periods: Iron Age - late medieval period
- Location: Amman Governorate, Jordan
- Region: Gilead

Site notes
- Condition: In ruins
- Public access: yes

Khirbet es-Sar is an archaeological site in Jordan. It lies in the western suburb of modern Amman, on the edge of a plateau (972 m a.s.l.). In the MEGA Jordan database, which stores information about sites located in Jordan, Khirbet es-Sar can be found under numbers 11304 (as Sarah) and 3007 (as Kh. Sar).

Its original name is unknown, and some scholars identify it with the ancient city of Jazer, mentioned several times in the Hebrew Bible and in 1 Maccabees.

== Archaeological research ==
The site was first mentioned by Selah Merrill in 1881, and other travelers referred to it in the late 19th and early 20th centuries as well. In 2000, Chang-ho C. Ji from La Sierra University in California included Khirbet es-Sar in his survey project. He identified a square building with a courtyard, which was thought to be a qasr (castle), and several other architectural complexes. However, no excavations or comprehensive reconnaissance were carried out.

Since 2018, work in Khirbet es-Sar has been conducted by an expedition from the Polish Centre of Mediterranean Archaeology University of Warsaw, directed by Prof. Jolanta Młynarczyk and Dr. Mariusz Burdajewicz from the Institute of Archaeology University of Warsaw in cooperation with Department of Antiquities of Jordan. The first-ever excavations on the site were preceded by non-invasive research: the whole area was surveyed using an electrical resistivity method, and all architectural objects visible on the surface were documented. The interpretation of the complex described earlier as qasr was corrected—current research suggests it was a temple complex. The walls of the square building were constructed of large stone blocks and measured 20 m in length. The temple was built in the 7th century BC. A rectangular courtyard with two rows of limestone arcades was added to it later.

The geophysical prospection revealed that there were numerous walls of buildings under the surface. The first complete map of the settlement, which had functioned from the Iron Age to the medieval period, was created on this basis. Pottery fragments from different periods were also identified; about 80% of them belong to Mamluk painted pottery. Khirbat es-Sar lies on the road linking the Jordan Valley with Rabbath Ammon, the Greco-Roman Philadelphia (modern Amman), so it must have been an important strategic and trade center.
