= Bosor =

Coordinates: 32.837990°N 36.339007°E

Bosor (Greek: Βοσόρ) was an ancient Biblical Levitical city and one of the three Trans-Jordanian Cities of Refuge named in the Mosaic Law. It was located in Gilead, and was conquered by Judas Maccabeus. It is sometimes identified with modern-day Busra al-Harir.

Josephus commented on its conquest.
