= Kohathites =

Division among the Levites in Biblical times

The Kohathites were one of the four main divisions among the Levites in biblical times, the other three being the Gershonites, the Merarites, and the Aaronites (more commonly known as Kohanim). The Torah claims that the Kohathites were all descended from the eponymous Kohath, a son of Levi.

== Overview ==
The Torah ascribes a specific religious function to the Kohathites, namely care of the vessels and objects within the sanctuary: the Ark of the Covenant, Menorah, Table of Showbread.

According to the Book of Joshua, rather than possessing a continuous territory, the Kohathites possessed several cities scattered throughout the geographic region in the Kingdom of Israel south of the Jezreel Valley, and in the region north of the Galilee, the latter being an extremely large distance apart from the former:

- in the territory of Ephraim: Shechem, Gezer, Kibzaim, and Beth-horon
- in the western part of the territory of Manasseh: Taanach, Gat Rimon
- in the territory of Dan: Eltekeh, Gibbethon, Aijalon, and Gath-rimmon

The narrative in Joshua assigns the territories to the Levites right after Joshua's conquest of Canaan, but some scholars believe this cannot be correct, as it is contradicted by archaeological evidence, as well as by other narratives in the Book of Judges, the Books of Samuel, and the Books of Kings; Gezer, for example, is portrayed in the narrative of the Book of Kings as only coming into the possession of the Levites during the reign of Solomon, and archaeological excavation of the site has shown that shortly prior to the Babylonian captivity it was still the site of a large temple to the Canaanite deity Astarte. However, a closer reading of the book of Judges reveals that the Canaanite peoples conquered by the invading Israelite tribes were often not completely subdued. The disputed territory was assigned to an individual or tribe, before any conquest was undertaken (e.g., Caleb's inheritance in Joshua 14). A major theme of the book of Judges is that the disorder portrayed in the book is a direct consequence of Israel lacking the will to finish the job of conquest, allowing their enemies to dwell in their midst.

== See also ==
- Gershonites
- Merarites
