= Cities of Refuge =

Six Levitical cities in the Kingdoms of Israel and Judah

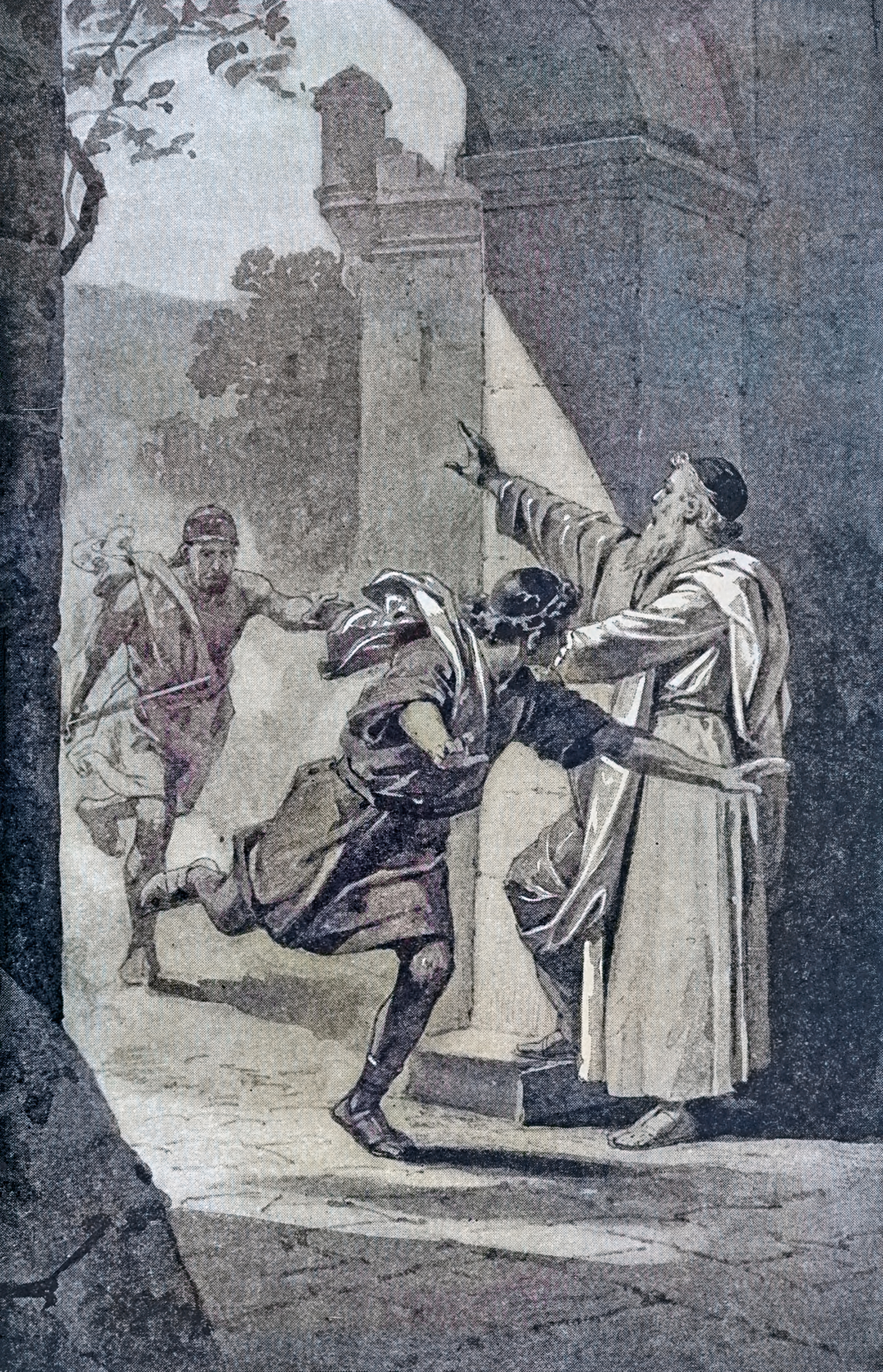
Fleeing to the City of Refuge (Numbers 35:11–28). From Charles Foster, The Story of the Bible, 1884.

Location of the cities of refuge on a map of the Middle East

The cities of refuge (Hebrew: ערי המקלט, romanized: ‘ārê ha-miqlāṭ) were six Levitical cities in the Kingdom of Israel and the Kingdom of Judah in which the perpetrators of accidental manslaughter could claim the right of asylum. Maimonides, invoking Talmudic literature, expands the city of refuge count to all 48 Levitical cities. Outside of these cities, blood vengeance against such perpetrators was allowed by law. The Bible names the six cities of refuge as follows: Golan, Ramoth, and Bosor to the east (left bank) of the Jordan River; and Kedesh, Shechem, and Hebron on the western (right) side.

== Biblical regulations ==
Cities of Refuge were established for those who had killed someone accidentally where there was no evidence that the person who had caused the death had a reason to hate the victim. The accidental killer was required to head to the safety of the City of Refuge or be subject to killing by the Goel Hadam, a relative who serves as the "blood avenger" of the victim, before he arrived there. After arriving in the City of Refuge, the killer was put on trial and was allowed to remain there if the killing was ruled accidental, or killed if the murder was ruled intentional.

=== In Numbers ===
In the Book of Numbers, the laws concerning the cities of refuge state that, once he had claimed asylum, a perpetrator had to be taken from the city and put on trial; if the trial found that the perpetrator was innocent of murder, then the perpetrator had to be returned under guard (for their own protection) to the city in which they had claimed asylum. This law code treats blood money as an unacceptable device that would compound the crime, insisting that atonement can only be made by the murderer's blood.

Numbers states that no harm was allowed to come to the perpetrator once the Jewish high priest had died, at which point the perpetrator was free to leave the city without fear.

=== In Deuteronomy ===
In the setting of the Book of Deuteronomy, the Israelites have conquered several kingdoms on the east side of the Jordan River, and are about to enter the land of Canaan. At this point, Moses separated three cities of refuge on the east side. Later on, it is prescribed that three cities of refuge be set aside in Canaan once it is conquered, with three additional cities to be set aside "if the Lord your God enlarges your territory". Thus, the total number of cities could be as high as nine. Albert Barnes stated that the additional three cities allowed for "the anticipated enlargement of the borders of Israel to the utmost limits promised by God, from the river of Egypt to the Euphrates" (Genesis 15:18) and the King James Version refers in Deuteronomy 19:8 to the enlargement of the coast of the Promised Land.

While the Book of Numbers describes the perpetrator being put on trial, Deuteronomy merely states that if the perpetrator is guilty of murder, the elders of the town in which the crime was committed should demand the perpetrator's return and hand him over without pity to the avenger of blood to be killed. Deuteronomy does not give any role to the high priest or mention the terms on which the perpetrator could return home, but does state that roads should be built to the cities of refuge to ease the escape of the perpetrator to them.

=== In Joshua ===
A chapter in the Book of Joshua also reiterates the regulations for the cities of refuge, adding that when a perpetrator arrived at the city, he had to disclose the events that had occurred to the city elders, after which they had to find him a place to live within the city. Modern biblical critics regard the chapter as being written by the Deuteronomist. Though the Masoretic Text for this chapter includes a role for the death of the high priest, the Septuagint's version of the chapter does not mention it.

== Origin and development ==
In many ancient cultures, the inviolability of deities was considered to extend to their religious sanctuaries and all that resided within, whether criminals, debtors, escaped slaves, priests, ordinary people, or, in some cases, passing cattle. Biblical scholars suspect that Israelite culture was originally no different. In general, the area covered by these rights of sanctuary varied from a small area around the altar or other centrepiece to a large area beyond the limits of the town containing the sanctuary (the limits often being marked in some way), depending on the significance of the deity and the importance of the sanctuary; it was considered a greater crime to drag an individual from the sanctuary or to kill them there than it was to defile the sanctuary itself.

Biblical scholars perceive this simple right of asylum at sanctuaries as being presented by the Covenant Code, which textual scholars attribute to the 8th century BC. Biblical scholars also believe that this right was the context underlying the account in the Books of Kings of Joab and Adonijah each fleeing from Solomon to an altar, with their opponents being unwilling to attack them while they remained there; textual scholars regard these passages as being part of the Court History of David, which they date to the 9th century BC, or earlier.

Over time, these general rights of asylum were gradually curtailed, as some sanctuaries had become notorious hotbeds of crime; in Athens, for example, the regulations were changed so that slaves were only permitted to escape to the sanctuary of the temple of Theseus. This is considered by scholars to be the reason that, in Israelite culture, the rights were restricted to just six locations by the time the Priestly Code was compiled—the late 7th century according to textual scholars—and it is thus regarded by biblical scholars as being no coincidence that the three cities of refuge to the west of the Jordan were also important ancient religious sanctuaries; little is known about the cities of refuge to the east of the Jordan (as of 1901), but scholars consider it reasonable to assume that they were once also important sanctuaries.

The Deuteronomic Code is regarded by textual scholars as dating from the reign of Josiah, which postdates the fall of the Kingdom of Israel to the Assyrians; this is considered to be the reason that only three (unnamed) cities of refuge are mentioned in the Deuteronomic Code, with a further three only being added if the Israelite territory was expanded, as by the time of Josiah's reign, the cities east of the Jordan were no longer controlled by the Israelites. The lack of importance given by the Deuteronomic Code to the identity of the cities of refuge is considered by scholars to be an attempt to continue the right of asylum, even though the sanctuaries (apart from the Temple in Jerusalem) had been abolished by Josiah's reforms.

== In rabbinic sources ==
As killers were freed from the city of refuge upon the death of the High Priest, the Mishnah states that the high priest's mother would traditionally supply them with clothing and food, so that they would not wish for the death of her son. The Talmud argues that the death of the high priest formed an atonement, as the death of pious individuals counted as an atonement. Maimonides argued that the death of the high priest was simply an event so upsetting to the Israelites that they dropped all thoughts of vengeance.

The Talmud states that, in accordance with the requirement to especially build roads to the cities of refuge, the roads to these cities were not only marked by signposts saying "Refuge", but the roads were 32 ells wide—twice the regulation width—and were particularly smooth and even, in order that fugitives were as unhindered as possible.

The classical rabbinical writers regarded all the cities controlled by the Levites as being cities of refuge, although they considered that asylum could only be claimed against the will of a city's inhabitants if the city was one of the six main cities of refuge. Although there the six main cities of refuge were named in the Bible, the Talmudic sources argued that other cities could, over time, be officially substituted for these six, to take account of changing political circumstances. The substitute cities of refuge were constrained to be only of moderate size, since, if they were too small, there could be scarcity of food, forcing the refugee to imperil himself by leaving the city to find sustenance, and, if they were too large, then it would be too easy for an avenger of blood to hide in the crowds; nevertheless, the surrounding region was required to be quite populous since that way, an attack by the avenger of blood could be more easily repelled. The altar of the Temple in Jerusalem also came to be regarded as a place of sanctuary, but only counted for the officiating priest, and even then only temporarily, as the priest ultimately had to be taken to a city of refuge; when Jerusalem was under Seleucid control, Demetrius I offered to turn the Temple into an official place of sanctuary, though the offer was turned down.

The rabbinical sources differentiated between four forms of killing, sometimes giving examples:

- Complete innocence, for which no further action was necessary. This situation arises when someone is killed while the perpetrator is fulfilling his legal duties such as corporal punishment; for example, a father who strikes his son, a teacher who disciplines/chastises his student, and an agent of the court deputized to flog transgressors. (Note: Translation: "In the case of one who threw the stone into his courtyard and killed a person, if the victim had permission to enter into there, the murderer is exiled, but if not, he is not exiled... all those liable to be exiled are examples of cases where the unintentional murderer was engaged in an activity that is optional. This serves to exclude a father who strikes his son, and a teacher who oppresses his student, and an agent of the court deputized to flog transgressors. If, in the course of performing the mitzva with which they are charged, they unintentionally murdered the son, the student, or the person being flogged, respectively, they are exempt.")
- Negligence, which required exile to a city of refuge. This situation arises when someone is killed as a result of legal activity, which the perpetrator was not required to perform.
- Severe carelessness, for which exile is insufficient. This situation arises when someone is accidentally killed as a result of illegal activity by the perpetrator; for example, this situation arises if a shop owner fails to maintain their property, and it collapses and kills a legitimate customer.
- Murder, which was subject to the death penalty.

According to classical rabbinical authorities, the cities of refuge were not places of protection, but places where atonement was made; Philo explained this principle as being based on the theory that an innocent man would never be chosen by God as the instrument of another man's death, and therefore those claiming refuge at these cities must have committed some sin before they had killed, for which their exile acts as an atonement. Thus, these rabbinical authorities argued that if the perpetrator had died before reaching a city of refuge, their body still had to be taken there, and, if they had died before the high priest had, then their body had to be buried at the city of refuge until the high priest expired; even if the perpetrator lived beyond the death of the high priest, some opinions forbade them from holding political office. Furthermore, since it was to be a place of atonement, the rabbinical authorities required that the perpetrator should always contemplate the fact that they had killed someone and should refuse any honour that the denizens of the city might grant them from time to time, unless the denizens persisted.

== See also ==
- Asylum (antiquity)
