= Daberath =

Biblical Levitical city

Daberath (Davrat) (dab'-e-rath) (Hebrew: דָּבְרַ֖ת; lit. "pasture") was a biblical Levitical city in the territory of Issachar, located near the border of Zebulun. It likely survives as the modern Israeli Arab village of Daburiyya. The nearby kibbutz of Dovrat is named after it.

It was important militarily, being located at the foot of Mount Tabor and guarding the entry to the Esdraelon plain. According to Josephus (ii.21.§3), who called this town Dabaritta, or Darabitta, a military garrison was stationed here. Jerome mentioned "a little village of the Jews by Mount Tabor, of the country belonging to Diocaesarea, called Dabira".
