= Tribe of Naphtali =

One of the twelve tribes of Israel

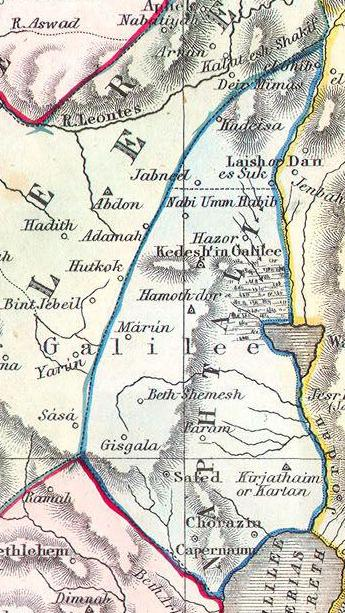
Territory allotted to Naphtali (1852 map)

The Tribe of Naphtali (Hebrew: נַפְתָּלִי, Modern: Nap̄talī, Tiberian: Nap̄tālī, "My struggle") was one of the northernmost of the twelve tribes of Israel.

== Biblical narratives ==
In the biblical account, following the completion of the conquest of Canaan by the Israelites, Joshua allocated the land among the twelve tribes. Kenneth Kitchen, a well-known biblical archeologist, dates this event to slightly after 1200 BCE, whereas other scholars dispute the historicity of the Book of Joshua.

Naphtali settled the eastern side of the Galilee (on the immediate west of the Sea of Galilee), in the areas now known as the Lower Galilee, and Upper Galilee, bordered on the west by Asher, in the north by Dan, in the south by Zebulun, and by the Jordan River on the east. The most significant city was Hazor.

Bordering the Sea of Galilee, there was the highly fertile plain of Gennesaret, characterised by Josephus as the ambition of nature, an earthly paradise, and with the southern portion of the region acting as a natural pass between the highlands of Canaan, several major roads (such as those from Damascus to Tyre and Acre) ran through it. The prosperity this situation brought is seemingly prophesied in the Blessing of Moses, though textual scholars view this as a postdiction, dating the poem to well after the tribe had been established in the land.

The Naphthalites received the eastern parts, as far as the city of Damascus and the Upper Galilee, unto mount Libanus, and the Fountains of Jordan, which rise out of that mountain; that is, out of that part of it whose limits belong to the neighbouring city of Arce.

From after the conquest of the land by Joshua until the formation of the first Kingdom of Israel in c. 1050 BC, the Tribe of Naphtali was a part of a loose confederation of Israelite tribes. No central government existed, and in times of crisis the people were led by ad hoc leaders known as Judges (see the Book of Judges). With the growth of the threat from Philistine incursions, the Israelite tribes decided to form a strong centralised monarchy to meet the challenge, and the Tribe of Naphtali joined the new kingdom with Saul as the first king. After the death of Saul, all the tribes other than Judah remained loyal to the House of Saul, but after the death of Ish-bosheth, Saul's son and successor to the throne of Israel, the Tribe of Naphtali joined the other northern Israelite tribes in making David, who was then the king of Judah, king of a re-united Kingdom of Israel. However, on the accession of Rehoboam, David's grandson, in c. 930 BC the northern tribes split from the House of David to reform a Kingdom of Israel as the Northern Kingdom.

In c. 732 BCE, Pekah allied with Rezin, king of Aram, threatened Jerusalem, and Ahaz, king of Judah, appealed to Tiglath-Pileser III, the king of Assyria, for help. After Ahaz paid tribute to Tiglath-Pileser, Tiglath-Pileser sacked Damascus and Israel, annexing Aram and a large part of Israel, "including all the land of Naphtali." According to 2 Kings 16:9 and 15:29, the population of Aram and the annexed part of Israel was deported to Assyria. Such deportation is also mentioned in the deuterocanonical Book of Tobit, which attributes it to Enemessar.

The Kingdom of Israel continued to exist until c. 723 BC, when it was again invaded by Assyria and the rest of the population deported. From that time, the Tribe of Naphtali has been counted as one of the Ten Lost Tribes of Israel.

== Origin ==
Map of the 12 tribes of Israel. Naphtali is located in the north.

According to the Torah, the tribe consisted of descendants of Naphtali, a son of Jacob and Bilhah, from whom it took its name. However, Arthur Peake views this as a postdiction, an eponymous metaphor providing an aetiology of the connectedness of the tribe to others in the Israelite confederation.

=== Family tree ===
	Naphtali	Merimah
Jahziel	Guni	Jezer	Shillem

== Character ==
Militarism is featured in Naphtali's history. In the ancient Song of Deborah, Naphtali is commended, along with Zebulun, for risking their lives in the fight against Sisera; in the prose account of the event, which Arthur Peake regards as a much later narrative based on the poem, there is the addition that Barak, the leader of the anti-Sisera forces, hails from the tribe of Naphtali. In the Gideon narrative Naphtali are one of the tribes which join in an attack against Midianite invaders, though Arthur Peake regards the Gideon narrative as being spliced together from at least three earlier texts, the oldest of which describes only personal vengeance by Gideon and 300 men of his own clan, not a battle in which the rest of the northern tribes join him. In the Blessing of Jacob, which textual scholars date to 700-600 BC - and thus a postdiction, Naphtali is compared to a hind let loose, and commended for giving goodly words.

The territory allotted to the tribe in Canaan was in the extreme north, and was bordered on the north by the Litani River, on the east by the River Jordan until it was 12 miles (19 km) south of the Sea of Galilee, on the west by the tribes of Asher and Zabulon; and on the south by the tribe of Issachar. The symbol of the tribe is a gazelle-a very quick animal. The people of Naftali is traditionally thought of as swift (swift runners).

== Fate ==
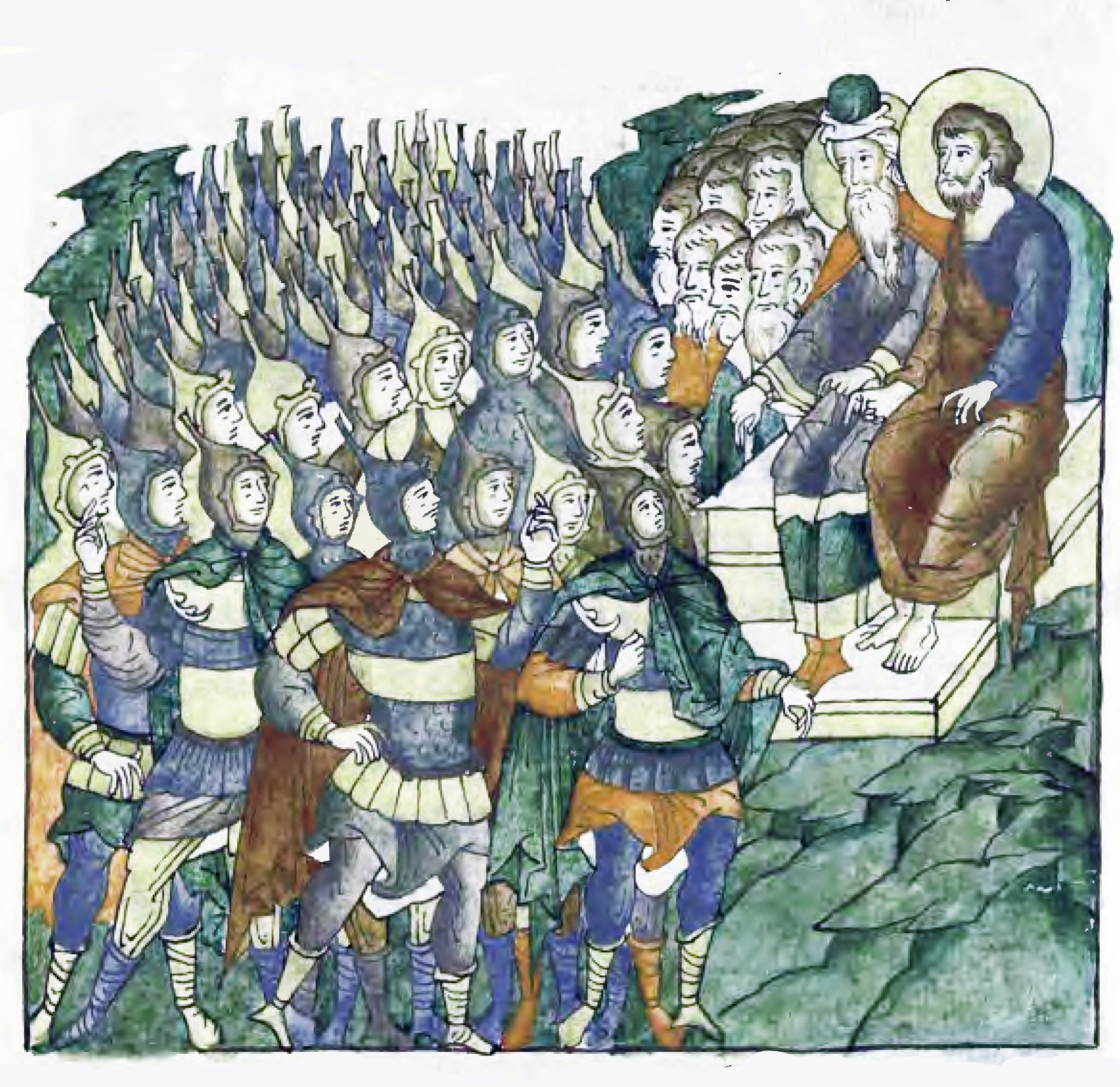
Moses counting Naphtali's kin

As part of the Kingdom of Israel, during one of the several wars between the Asa of the kingdoms of Judah and Baasha of Israel, the tribe of Naphtali was persecuted by Ben-Hadad, the king of Aram-Damascus, on behalf of Asa, the king of Judah, and desolated. Again, in the reign of Pekah this tribe was among the first to feel the iron hand of Assyria and to suffer the deportation of many captives. In a reference to this incident, the prophet Isaiah anticipates that the same region will see the dawn of the Messianic deliverance.

In c. 732 BCE, Naphtali's territory was conquered by the Neo-Assyrian Empire and king Tiglath-Pileser III had the entire population deported. The exile led to their further history being lost.

One of the famous battles of the Maccabean war was fought near Kedesh-naphtali about B.C. 150, when Jonathan defeated Demetrius, King of Syria; Josephus, "Ant." xiii. 5, § 6).

== Descendants ==
Beginning in the 19th century, Biblical scholarship has largely doubted the historicity of the Twelve Tribes, including the lost tribes. However, there have still been claimants and speculation of the ancestry of these tribes. The speculative descendants of Naphtali include:

- Ethiopian Jews, also known as Beta Israel, claim descent from the Tribe of Dan, whose members migrated south along with members of the tribes of Gad, Asher, and Naphtali, into the Kingdom of Kush, now Ethiopia and Sudan, during the destruction of the First Temple.
- The Mountain Jews of the Caucasus.
- The Bukharian Jews of Central Asia.
- Proponents of Nordic Israelism identify the Tribe of Naphtali with Norway or Sweden.
- Pacific Islanders (Cook Islands, Samoans, Hawaiians, Tongans, Fijians, etc.).
