= Ayla Oasis =

Real estate project in Aqaba, Jordan

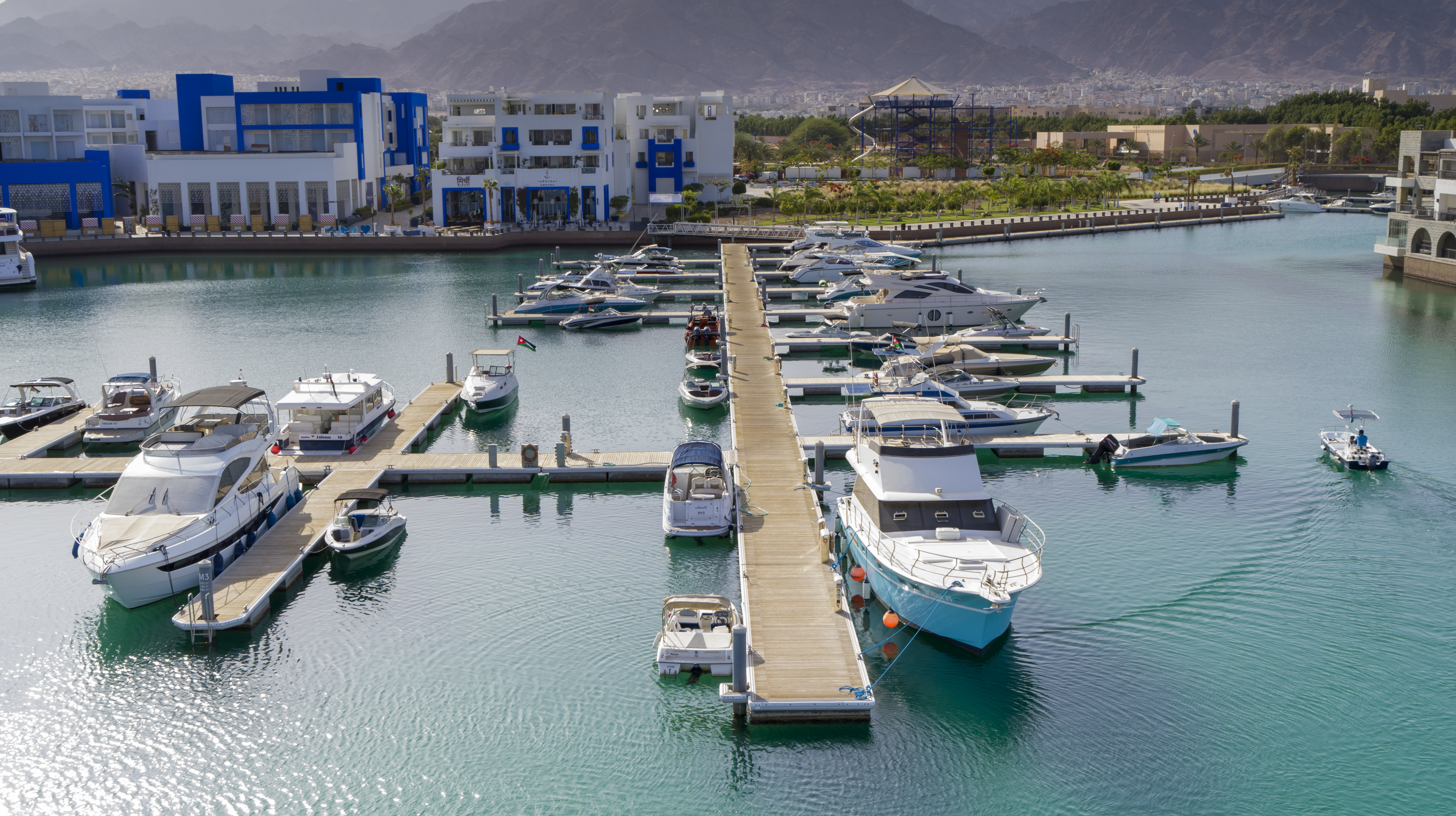
Waterfront residential complex and marina at Ayla Oasis

Ayla Oasis is large-scale real estate development project in Aqaba, Jordan. The development, which its backers project to cost in excess of $2 billion once fully completed, aims to create a waterfront community on the shores of the Red Sea. The project covers an area of approximately 430 hectares (4.3 km^{2}) and has residential, commercial, and leisure facilities. Ayla Oasis is centered around a marina and a golf course. The golf course was designed by Greg Norman and opened in 2017.

The development, which involved the construction of man-made seawater lagoons to create additional waterfronts, features villas, apartments, and (as of 2018) two hotels. The property, which has retail outlets, restaurants, cafes, bars, recreational facilities, leisure and entertainment amenities, also has a marina. This marina, which has berthing facilities for yachts and boats, reportedly received environmental and safety awards in 2024.

== History ==
The project concept originated in 2002 after the Jordanian government allocated land in Aqaba for investment. Sabih al-Masri established Ayla Oasis on a site that was previously barren and contained remnants of mines. The Ayla Oasis Development Company (AODC) was established in June 2003 to oversee the development. Development began in 2008 under the management of Sahl Dudin and was aligned with the strategic plan of the Aqaba Special Economic Zone Authority (ASEZA) to diversify Aqaba's economy. The works involved the addition of a lagoon system which added approximately 17 km (11 mi) of waterfront along the development's existing 235-meters of shoreline.

== Design and features ==
Ayla Oasis includes several residential communities, hotels and serviced apartments. The Hyatt brand operates within the development. The project also incorporates a marina, recreational areas, and cultural spaces that host exhibitions and community events.

Ayla Oasis incorporates a number of environmental management practices, including artificial coral reefs, coral nurseries, wildlife, artificial lagoons, corridors and native plant landscaping. The "Feather Trail" is a designated bird migration stopover that has recorded over 130 species, including globally threatened birds.

== Sport ==
The site has an 18-hole championship golf course and a 9-hole academy course designed by Greg Norman Golf Course Design. The 18-hole course, which overlooks the Red Sea and surrounding mountains, is located within an artificial lagoon system. It opened in 2016, The golf club also has golf academy facilities. The course has previously hosted the Jordan Open Golf Championship.

Other sports facilities include water sports, tennis, football, padel and basketball facilities. There are also cycling and walking paths in the development.
