= Aqaba =

City in Aqaba Governorate, Jordan

Aqābaʾ الْعَقَبَة
- City
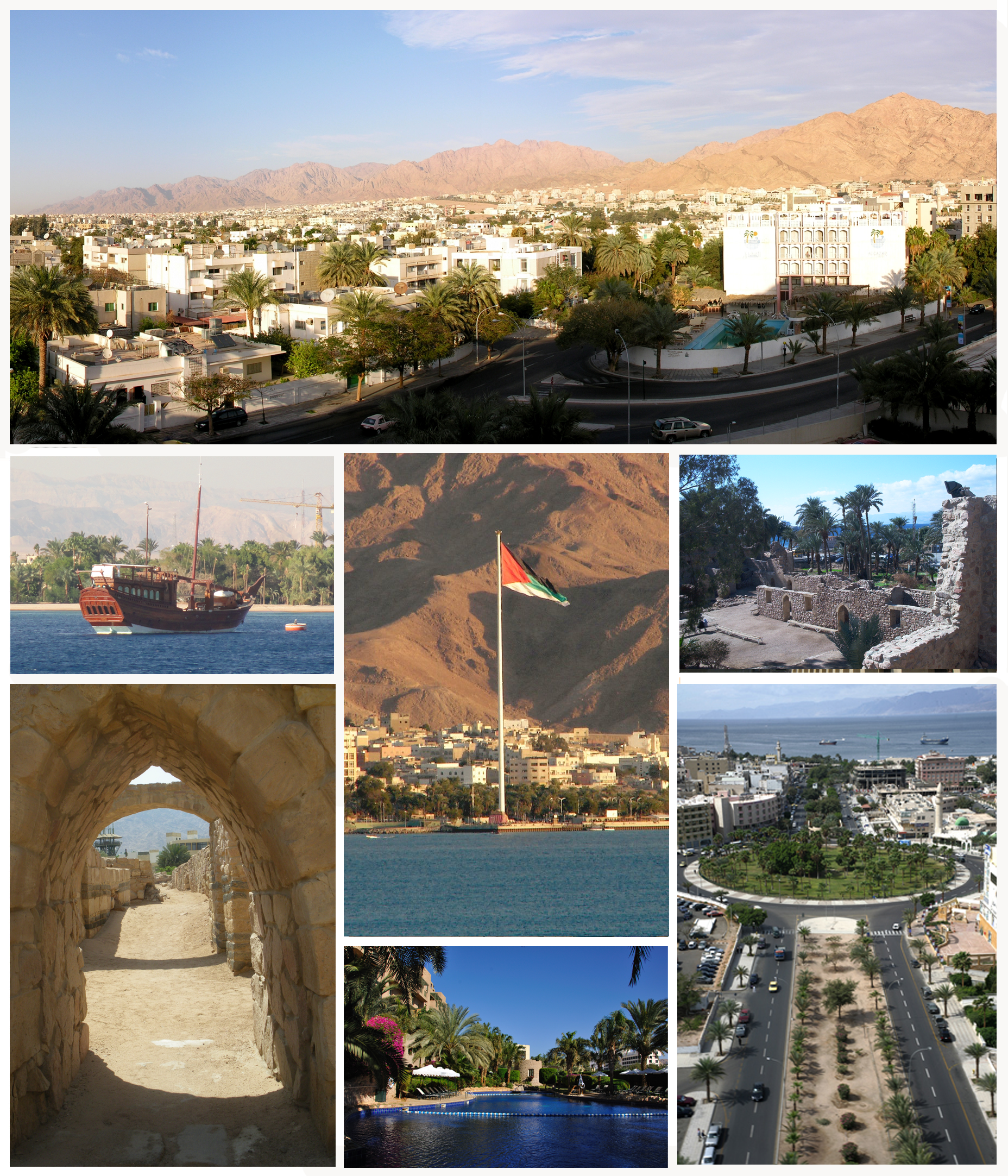
- Clockwise from the left top: Aqaba's skyline, Aqaba Fort and Aqaba Fields, Al-Hammamat Al-Tunisyya Street in Down Town, Resort in Aqaba, Ayla old City, Aqaba Port, Aqaba Flagpole.
- Nickname: The Bride of the Red Sea
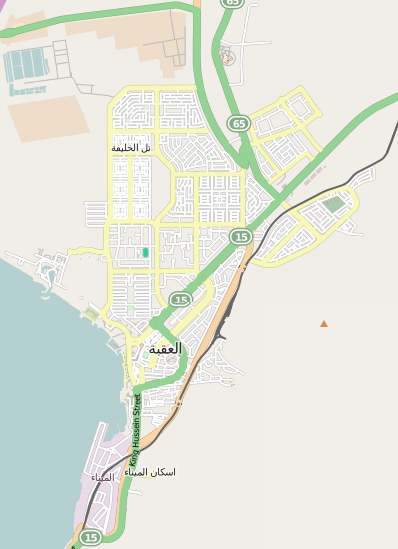
- Interactive map of Aqābaʾ
- Location within Jordan
- Coordinates: 29°31′55″N 35°00′20″E
- Country: Jordan
- Governorate: Aqaba Governorate
- Founded: 4000 BC
- Authority: 2001

Area
  - City: 375 km^{2} (145 sq mi)
- Elevation: 6 m (20 ft)

Population (2021)
  - City: 95,048
  - Density: 502/km^{2} (1,300/sq mi)
  - Urban: 148,398
- Demonym: Aqabawi
- Time zone: +2 Eastern European Standard Time
  - Summer (DST): +3 Arabia Standard Time
- Postal code: 77110
- Area code: +(962)3
- Website: www.aqabazone.com; www.aqaba.jo

Aqābaʾ (/ˈækəbə/ AK-ə-bə, US also /ˈɑːk-/ AHK-; Arabic: الْعَقَبَة, romanized: al-ʿAqaba, pronounced [ælˈʕæqɑba, ælˈʕæɡæba]) is the only coastal city in Jordan and the largest and most populous city on the Gulf of Aqaba. Situated in southernmost Jordan, Aqaba is the administrative center of the Aqaba Governorate. The city had a population of 148,398 in 2015 and a land area of 375 square kilometres (144.8 sq mi).

Aqaba's location at the northeastern tip of the Red Sea between the continents of Asia and Africa has made its port important for millennia. The ancient city was called Elath, whose proximity to copper mines made it a regional hub for copper production and trade in the Chalcolithic period. Under Byzantine rule, Aela became a bishopric, and the Aqaba Church, the world's oldest known purpose-built Christian church, was constructed there. Following the Islamic conquest around AD 650, the city became known as Ayla and later became a Latin Catholic titular see. The name Aqaba did not come into use until the late medieval period. During the Great Arab Revolt, the prominent Battle of Aqaba saw joint Arab and British victory over Ottoman troops.

Aqaba's location next to Wadi Rum and Petra has made it one of the major tourist attractions in Jordan. The city is administered by the Aqaba Special Economic Zone Authority, which has turned Aqaba into a low-tax, duty-free city, attracting several tourist resort area like Ayla Oasis, Saraya Aqaba, Marsa Zayed, and Tala Bay. They are expected to turn the city into a major tourism hub in the region. However, industrial and commercial activities remain important, due to the strategic location of the city as the country's only seaport.

The city is served by the King Hussein International Airport, while the Port of Aqaba serves as Jordan's principal seaport and a gateway for other countries in the region. The city sits right across the border from Eilat, likewise Israel's only port on the Red Sea. After the 1994 Israel–Jordan peace treaty, there were plans and hopes of establishing a trans-border tourism and economic area, but few of those plans have become real.

== Name ==
=== Elath and derivates ===
The ancient endonym (name given by the local population) of the city was Elath or Ailath. The name may be derived from the Semitic name of a tree in the genus Pistacia, or from the West Semitic word *'ayl 'ram' with the feminine suffix -at. A Phoenician variant of the name אֵלוֹת is mentioned once in the Hebrew Bible in 1 Kings 9:26, reflecting the Phoenician vowel shift. Modern Eilat (established 1947), situated about 5 km (3.1 mi) north-west of Aqaba, also takes its name from the ancient settlement. In the Hellenistic period, it was renamed Berenice (Ancient Greek: Βερενίκη Bereníkē), but the original name survived, and under Roman rule was re-introduced in the forms Aila, Aela or Haila, adopted in Byzantine Greek as Αἴλα Aíla and in Arabic as Ayla (آيلا). The crusaders called the city Elyn.

=== Aqaba ===
The present name al-ʿAqaba (العقبة) is a shortened form of ʿaqabat ʿAylah (عقبة آيلة, usually translated as 'the mountain-pass of Ayla'), a name first mentioned in the 12th century by Idrisi, at a time when the settlement had been mostly reduced to a military stronghold (not positively identified by archaeologists; see here), possibly referring to the pass just to the north-east of the settlement (29.559°N 35.095°E, now traversed by the Jordanian Aqaba Highway).

The root of ʿaqaba[t] means slope, the word itself meaning either 'mountain road', 'pass', 'ascent', or in a wider sense 'obstacle'. Authors like Harold W. Glidden (1952) connect the name to the pass to the north through Wadi el-Yutm (see the King's Highway), with Alois Musil seeing behind the aqabat the pass to the south toward Mecca (see History of the Hajj: Egyptian route), while Donald Whitcomb suggests a connection to a hillock inside the settlement, interpreting the name as "slope/obstacle of Ayla".

== History ==
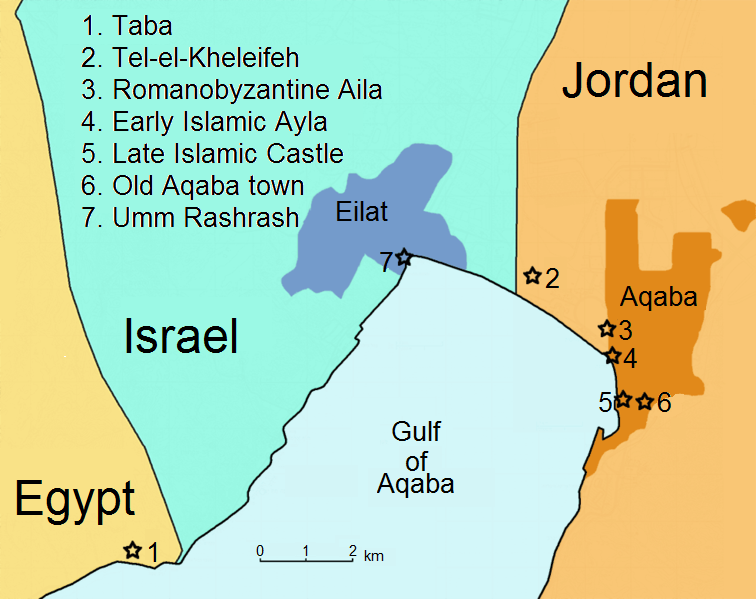
Main historical sites in the northern part of the Gulf of Aqaba

=== Nearby Chalcolithic sites ===
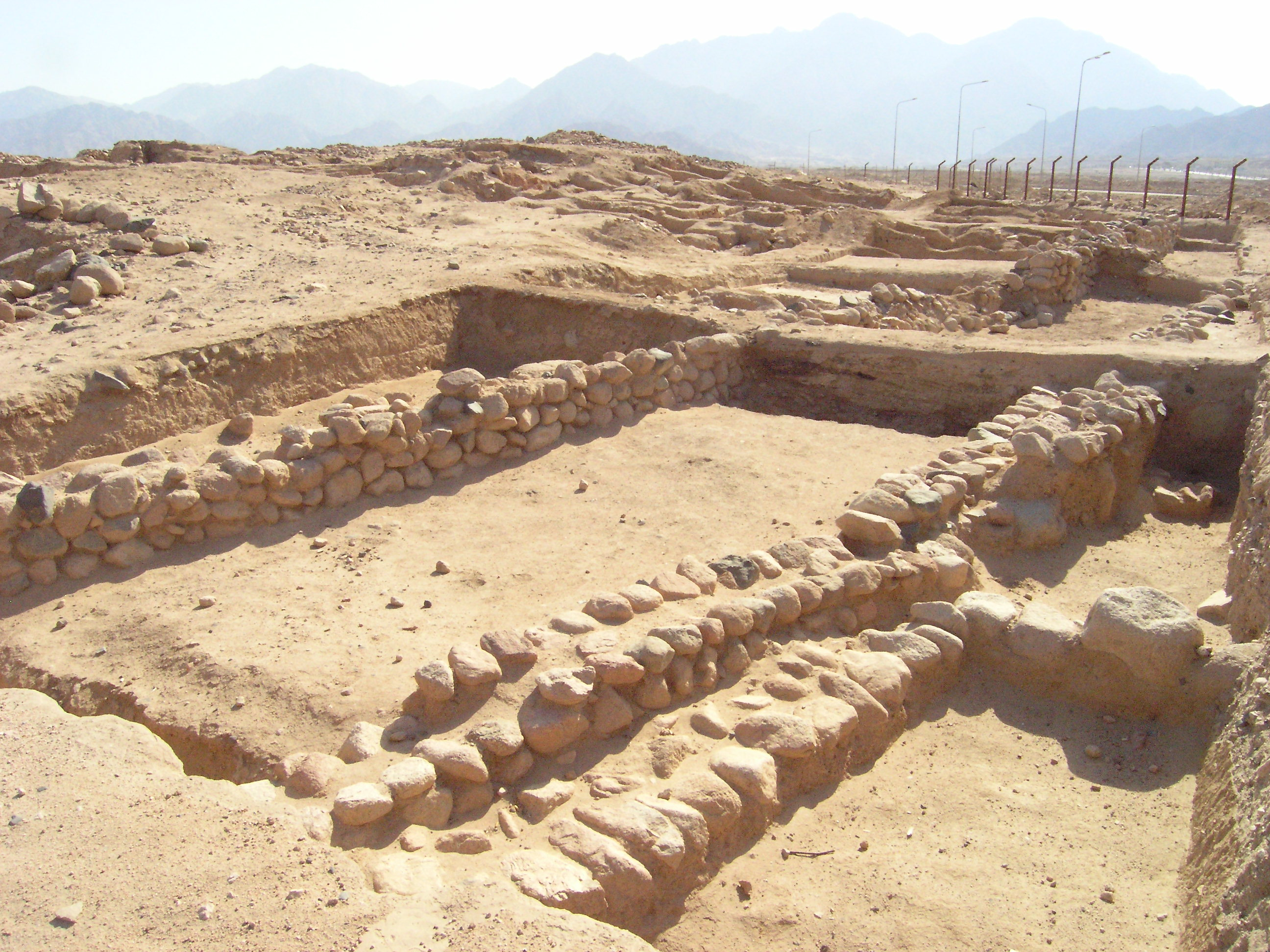
Tall Hujayrat Al-Ghuzlan excavations

Excavations at two tells (archaeological mounds) Tall Hujayrat Al-Ghuzlan and Tall Al-Magass, both a few kilometres north of modern-day Aqaba city, revealed inhabited settlements from c. 4000 BC during the Chalcolithic period, with thriving copper production on a large scale. This period is largely unknown due to the absence of written historical sources. University of Jordan archaeologists have discovered the sites, where they found a small building whose walls were inscribed with human and animal drawings, suggesting that the building was used as a religious site. The people who inhabited the site had developed an extensive water system in irrigating their crops which were mostly made up of grapes, olives and wheat. Several different-sized clay pots were also found suggesting that copper production was a major industry in the region, the pots being used in melting the copper and reshaping it. Scientific studies performed on-site revealed that it had undergone two earthquakes, with the latter one leaving the site completely destroyed.

=== Early history ===
==== Elath ====
The Edomites, who ruled over Edom just south of the Dead Sea, are believed to have built the first port in Aqaba called Elath around 1500 BC, turning it into a major hub for the trade of copper as the Phoenicians helped them develop their maritime economy. They profited from its strategic location at the junction of trading routes between Asia and Africa.

==== Tell el-Kheleifeh ====
Archaeologists have investigated an Iron Age settlement at Tell el-Kheleifeh, immediately west of Aqaba, inhabited between the 8th and 4th centuries BCE.

==== Undefined ====
Around 735 BC, the city was conquered by the Assyrian empire. Because of the wars the Assyrians were fighting in the east, their trading routes were diverted to the city and the port witnessed relative prosperity. The Babylonians conquered it in 600 BC. During this time, Elath witnessed great economic growth, which is attributed to the business background of its rulers who realized how important the city's location was. The Persian Achaemenid Empire took the city in 539 BC.

=== Classical antiquity ===
==== Hellenistic period ====
The city continued to grow and prosper which made it a major trading hub by the time of the Greek rule by 300 BC, after the Wars of Alexander the Great, it was described by a Greek historian to be "one of the most important trading cities in the Arab World". The Ptolemaic Greeks called it Berenice.

The Nabatean kingdom had its capital north of the city, at Petra.

==== Roman period ====
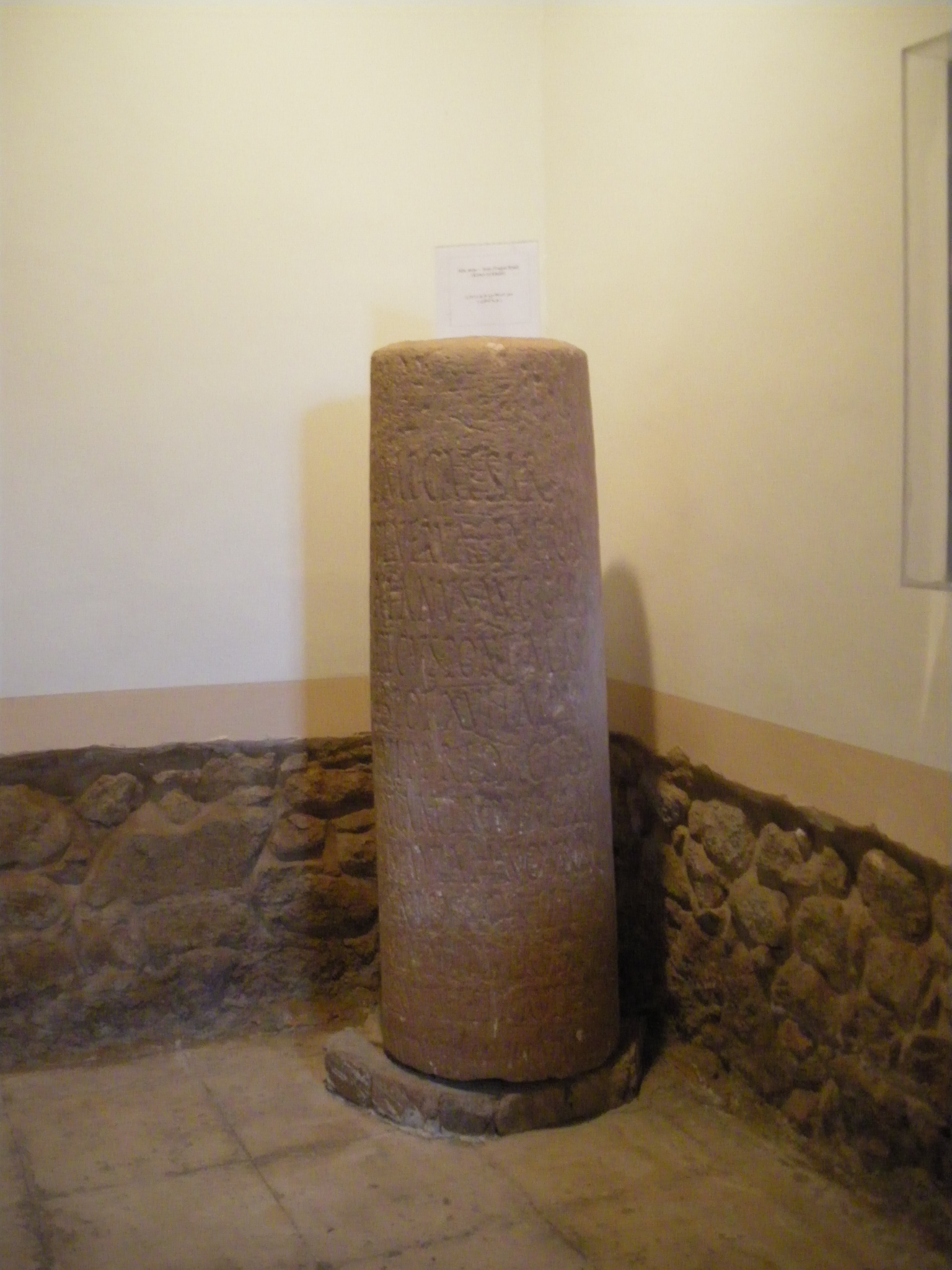
Roman milestone that marked the starting point of the Via Nova Traiana

In 64 BC, following the Roman conquest, they annexed the city and called it Aela (also Haila, Aelana, in Greek rendered Αἴλα Aila). (Note: In classical texts the Roman city is known as Aela, occasionally Haila or Aelana. Aela is the standard form of the name in Roman-era classical studies.)

Both Petra and Aela were under strong Nabatean influence despite the Roman rule. Aela reached its peak during Roman times, the great long-distance road the Via Traiana Nova led south from Bostra through Amman, terminating in Aela, where it connected with a west road leading to the Paralia and Roman Egypt.

Around AD 106 Aela was one of the main ports for the Romans.

==== Late Roman and Byzantine periods ====
The Aqaba Church was constructed under Roman rule between 293 and 303 and is considered to be the oldest known purpose-built Christian church in the world. By the time of Eusebius, Aela became the garrison of the Legio X Fretensis, which was moved to Aela from Jerusalem.

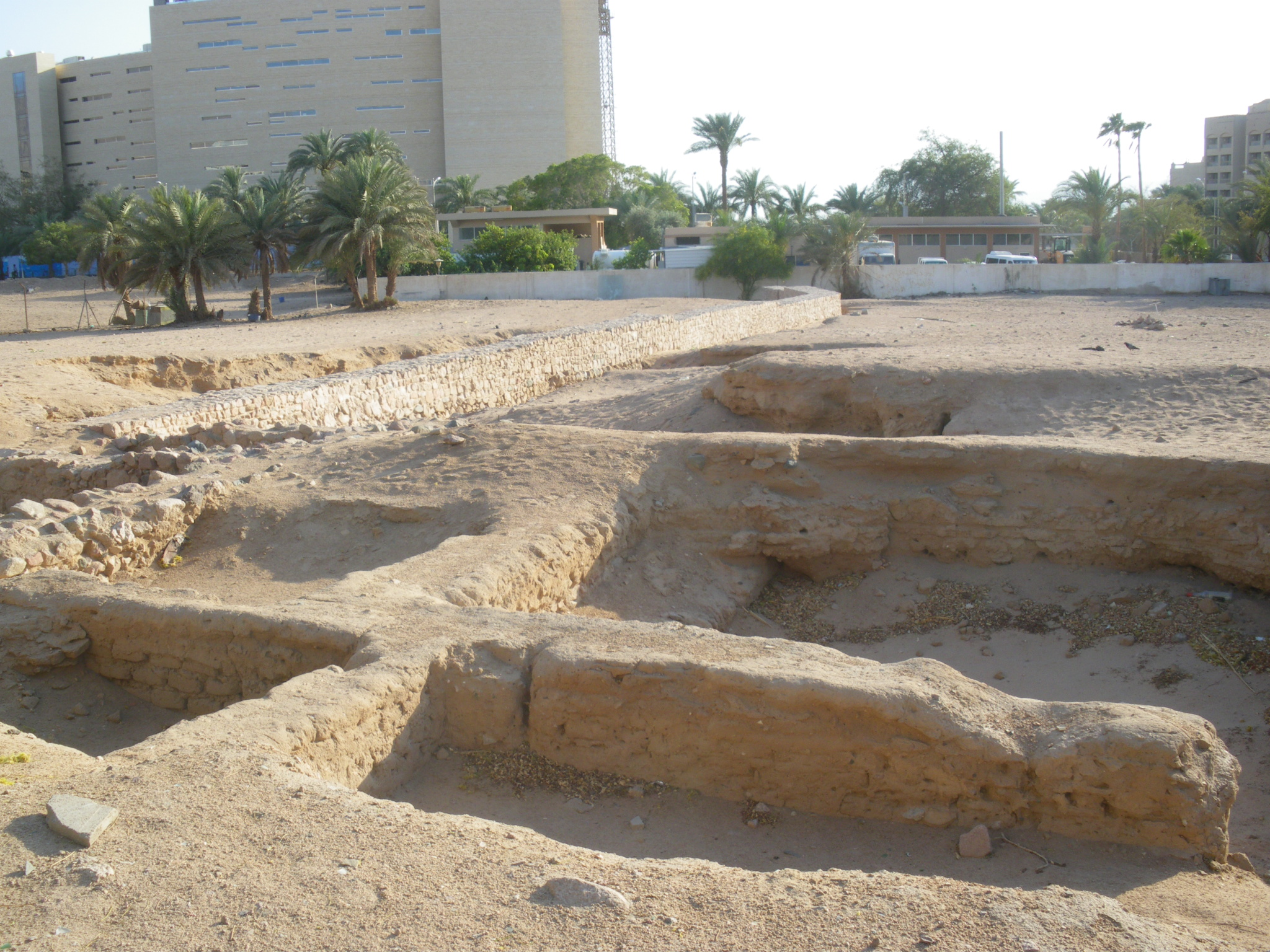
Aqaba Church from around AD 300

One of the oldest known texts written in the Arabic alphabet is a late 4th-century inscription found in Jabal Ram 50 kilometres (31 miles) east of Aqaba.

The city became a Christian bishopric at an early stage. Its bishop Peter was present at the First Council of Nicaea, the first ecumenical council, in 325. Beryllus was at the Council of Chalcedon in 451, and Paul at the synod called by Patriarch Peter of Jerusalem in 536 against Patriarch Anthimus I of Alexandria, a council attended by bishops of the Late Roman provinces of Palaestina Prima, Palaestina Secunda and Palaestina Tertia, to the last-named of which Aela belonged.

A citadel was also built in the area that became the focal point of the Roman southern defense system.

In the 6th century, Procopius of Caesarea mentioned a Jewish population in Eilat and its surroundings which enjoyed autonomy until the time of Justinian I (r. 527–565).

According to Ibn Ishaq, Muhammad himself reached Aila during the expedition of Tabuk of 630, and extracted tribute from the city.

During the Late Byzantine or even Early Muslim period, Aila was the origin of what came to be known as the Ayla-Axum amphoras.

=== Early Muslim Ayla ===
Aila fell to the Islamic armies by 629, and the ancient settlement was left to decay, while a new Arab city was established outside its walls under Uthman ibn Affan, known as Ayla (Arabic: آيلا).

The Early Muslim city was excavated in 1986 by a team from the University of Chicago. Artefacts are now on exhibit at Aqaba Archaeological Museum and Jordan Archaeological Museum in Amman. The fortified city was inscribed in a rectangle of 170 by 145 metres (558 ft × 476 ft), with walls 2.6 metres (8 ft 6 in) thick and 4.5 metres (14 ft 9 in) high, surrounding a fortified structure, occupying an area of 35 by 55 metres (115 ft × 180 ft). 24 towers defended the city. The city had four gates on all four sides, defining two main lines intersecting at the centre. The intersection of these two thoroughfares was indicated by a tetrapylon (a four-way arch), which was later transformed into a luxury residential building decorated with frescoes dated to the tenth century. This type of urban structure, known as a misr (pl. amsar), is typical of early Islamic fortified settlements.

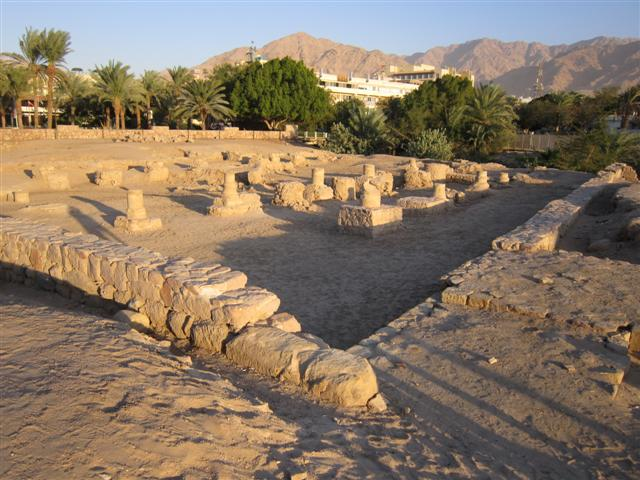
Early Muslim Ayla

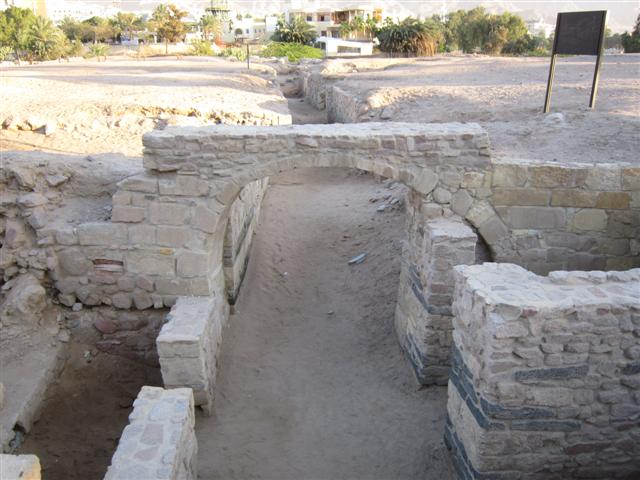
Early Muslim Ayla

The city prospered from 661 to 750 under the Umayyads and beyond under the Abbasids (750–970) and the Fatimids (970–1116). Ayla took advantage of its key position as an important step on the road to India and Arab spices (frankincense, myrrh), between the Mediterranean Sea and the Arabian Peninsula. The city is also mentioned in several stories of the Arabian Nights.

The geographer Shams Eddin Muqaddasi describes Ayla as nearby the ruined ancient city.

The city was mentioned in Medieval Arabic sources as having a mixed population of Jews and Christians. It subsequently became an important station for pilgrim caravans on the way to Mecca.

The city was "completely destroyed" by the 1068 Near East earthquake.

=== Crusader/Ayyubid and Mamluk periods ===
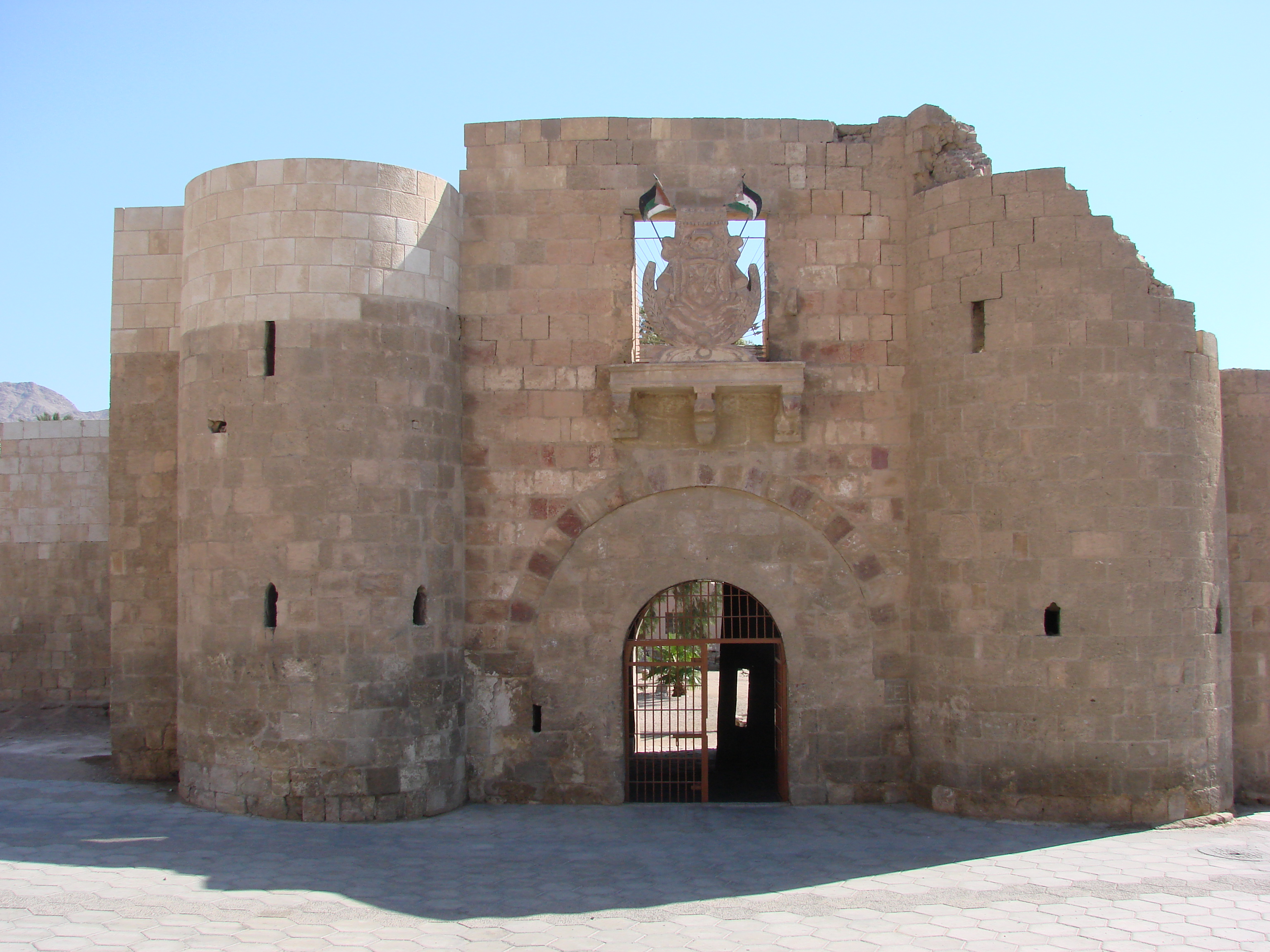
The Muslim fortress of Aqaba

Baldwin I of Jerusalem took over the city in 1115 without encountering much resistance. The centre of the city then moved to 500 meters along the coast to the south, and the crusader fortress of Elyn was built, which allowed the Kingdom of Jerusalem to dominate all roads between Damascus, Egypt, and Arabia, protecting the Crusader states from the east and allowing for profitable raids on trade caravans passing through the area. In order to secure this strategic position, Baldwin also built and garrisoned a fortress on Pharaoh's Island (called Île de Graye by the Franks), the modern Jazīrat Fir'aun in Egyptian territorial waters about 7 kilometres (4.3 miles) west of Aqaba.

The garrison of Elyn (now serving primarily as a military outpost) was further strengthened in 1142 by Pagan the Butler, Lord of Oultrejourdain, who pursued an ambitious program of castle building throughout his domain. However, there was no large-scale settlement of Europeans in the area, and the region between the Dead Sea and the Gulf of Aqaba remained mainly inhabited by Bedouins, who were obliged to pay tribute to the Lordship of Oultrejourdain. Despite all efforts to fortify the region, the city was captured in 1170 by a squadron sent by Saladin as he was besieging Gaza; while it was successfully raided by Raynald of Châtillon in 1182, it was never retaken by the Crusaders.

What is known today as Aqaba Fortress was built by Mamluk sultan Al-Ashraf Qansuh Al-Ghuri in the early 16th century, possibly on top of the Crusader fort. For the next four centuries, the site was a simple fishing village of little importance.

=== Modern history ===
During World War I, the Ottoman forces were forced to withdraw from Aqaba in 1917 after the Battle of Aqaba, led by T. E. Lawrence and the Arab forces of Auda Abu Tayi and Sherif Nasir. The capture of Aqaba allowed the British to supply the Arab forces. In 1918, the regions of Aqaba and Ma'an were officially incorporated into the Kingdom of the Hejaz. In 1925, Ibn Saud the ruler of Nejd with the help of his Wahhabi Ikhwan troops successfully annexed the Hejaz, but gave up the Ma'an and Aqaba to the British protectorate of Transjordan.

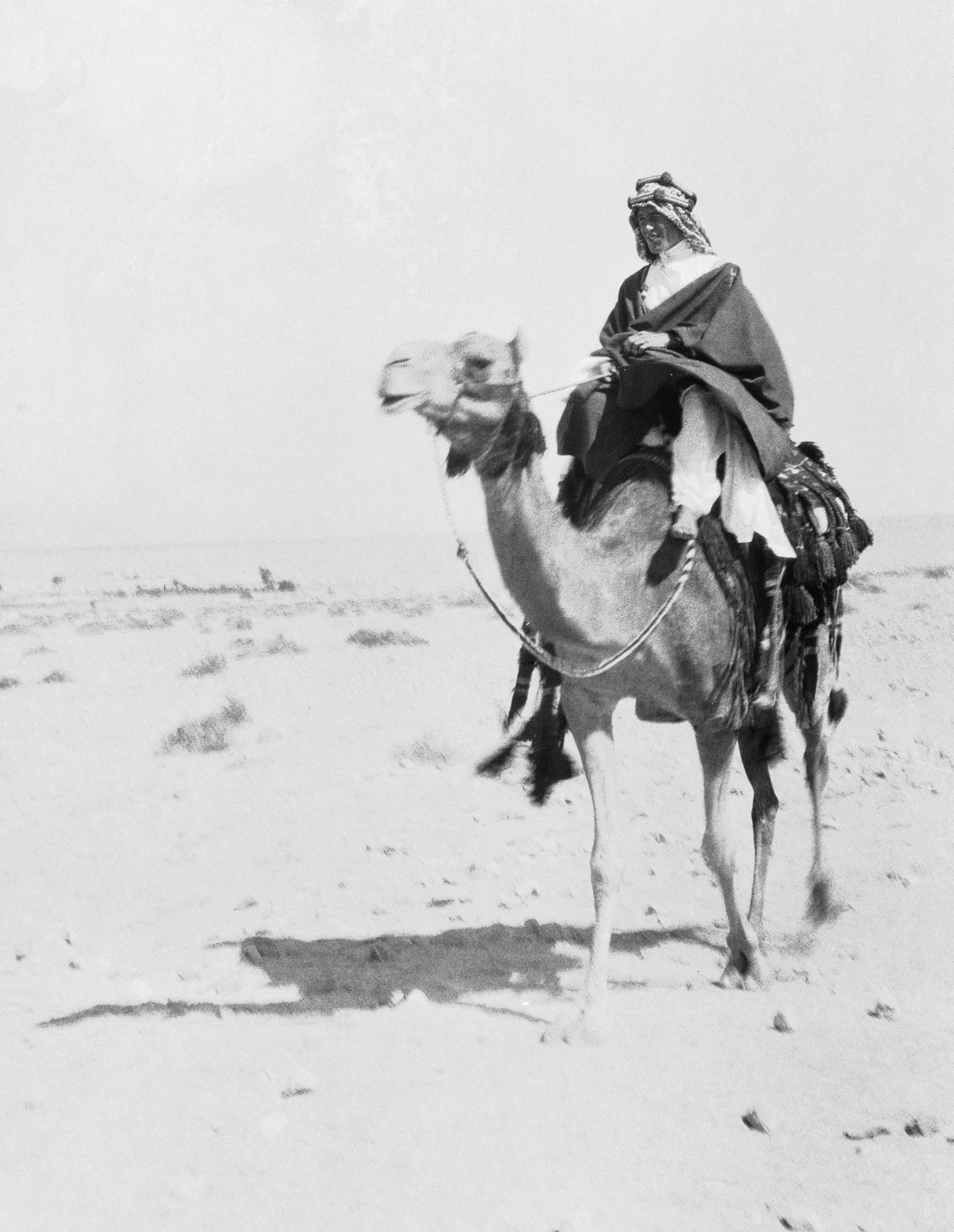
Lawrence of Arabia on a camel in Aqaba in 1917

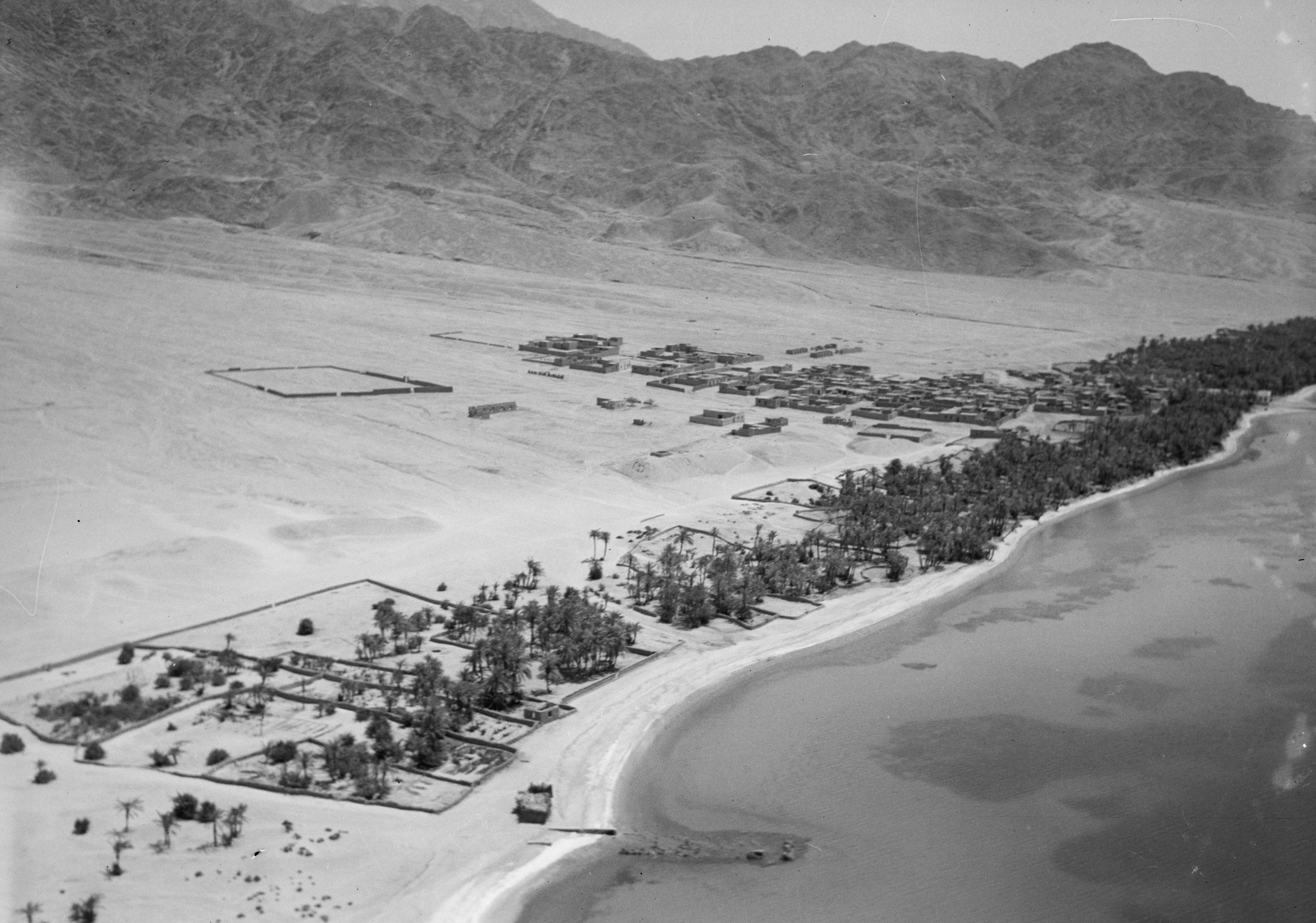
Aqaba in 1937

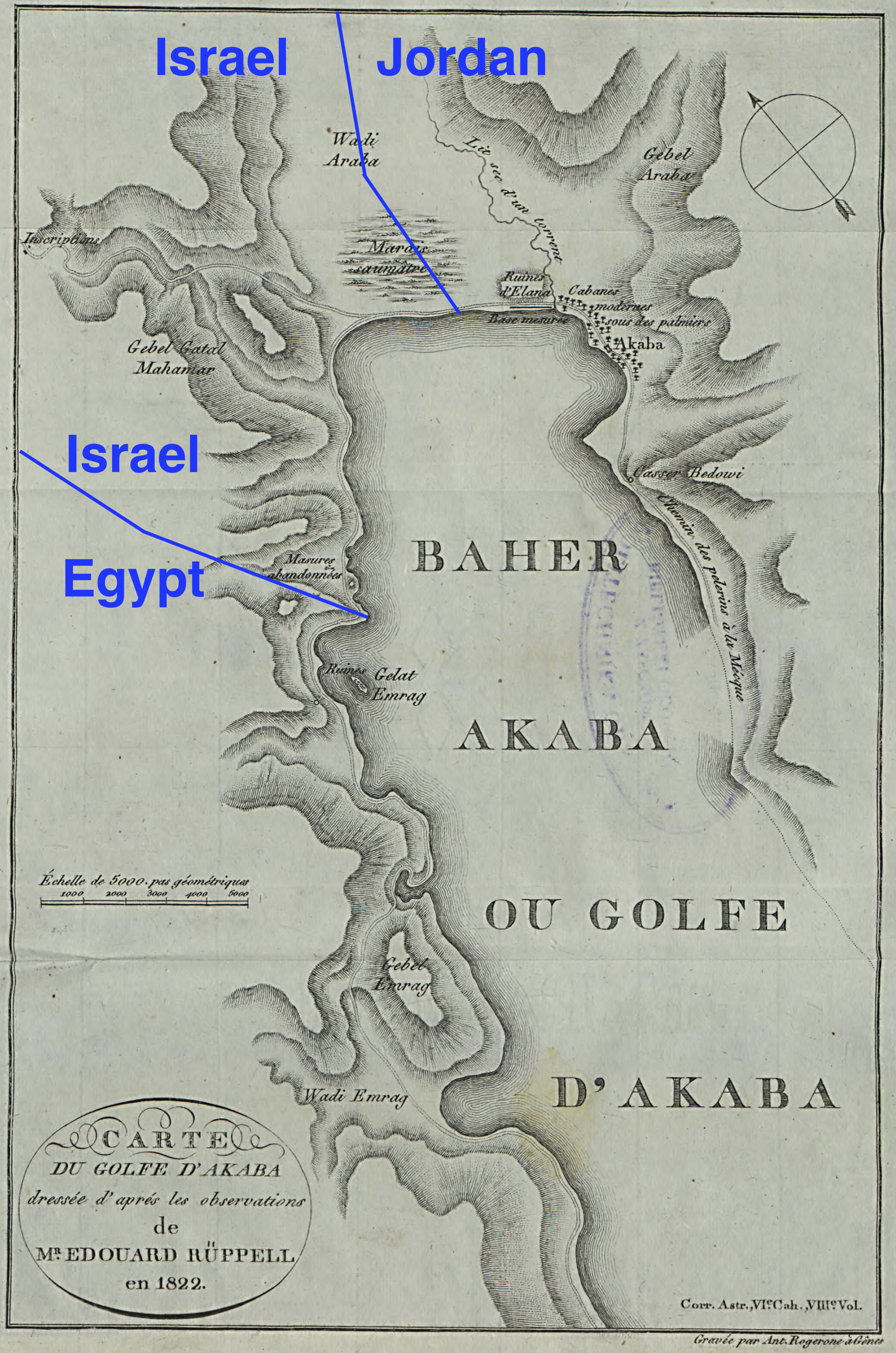
1822 area map by Eduard Rüppell, modern borders overlaid. His "Ruines d'Elana" is the site of Tell el-Kheleifeh.

The Jordanian census of 1961 found 8,908 inhabitants in 'Aqaba.

In 1965, King Hussein, through an exchange deal with Saudi Arabia, gave 6,000 square kilometres (2,317 square miles) of desert land in Jordanian territories in exchange for other territories, including 12 kilometres (7 miles) of an extension of prime coastline south of Aqaba, which included the Yamanieh coral reef. Aqaba was a major site for imports of Iraqi goods in the 1980s until the Persian Gulf War.

In 1997, the Aqaba Marine Reserve was established within the southern boundaries of the Gulf of Aqaba.

On 27 June 2022, a port in Aqaba became the scene of a toxic gas leak when a chemical storage container carrying 25 tons of chlorine fell from a crane onto a ship and ruptured. The leak resulted in the deaths of 13 people.

== Geography ==
The city lies at Jordan's southernmost point, on the Gulf of Aqaba lying at the tip of the Red Sea. Its strategic location is shown in the fact that it is located at the crossroads of the continents of Asia and Africa, while bordering Israel, Egypt and Saudi Arabia.

=== Climate ===
Aqaba has a hot desert climate (Köppen climate classification BWh) with mild, sometimes warm winters and very hot dry summers. Subzero temperatures can be observed every few years. The record high temperature of 49.6 °C (121.3 °F) was registered on 14 August 2025. The record low temperature of −3.9 °C (25.0 °F) was on January 16, 2008, as in Eilat.

Climate data for Aqaba (1991–2020 normals, extremes 1950–present)
Month	Jan	Feb	Mar	Apr	May	Jun	Jul	Aug	Sep	Oct	Nov	Dec	Year
Mean daily maximum °C (°F)	20.9 (69.6)	22.6 (72.7)	26.4 (79.5)	31.7 (89.1)	36.6 (97.9)	40.1 (104.2)	41.3 (106.3)	41.1 (106.0)	38.8 (101.8)	34.0 (93.2)	27.5 (81.5)	22.3 (72.1)	31.9 (89.4)
Daily mean °C (°F)	15.2 (59.4)	16.7 (62.1)	20.1 (68.2)	24.8 (76.6)	29.3 (84.7)	32.5 (90.5)	34.0 (93.2)	33.9 (93.0)	31.8 (89.2)	27.6 (81.7)	21.4 (70.5)	16.6 (61.9)	25.3 (77.6)
Mean daily minimum °C (°F)	9.6 (49.3)	10.7 (51.3)	13.7 (56.7)	17.8 (64.0)	21.9 (71.4)	24.8 (76.6)	26.6 (79.9)	26.7 (80.1)	24.7 (76.5)	21.1 (70.0)	15.3 (59.5)	11.0 (51.8)	17.0 (62.6)
Average precipitation mm (inches)	5.0 (0.20)	4.0 (0.16)	4.5 (0.18)	2.0 (0.08)	1.0 (0.04)	0.0 (0.0)	0.0 (0.0)	0.0 (0.0)	0.0 (0.0)	3.5 (0.14)	3.2 (0.13)	5.5 (0.22)	28.7 (1.13)
Average relative humidity (%)	51	45	40	34	30	27	29	32	35	41	47	53	39
Source: Jordan Meteorological Department

== Local government ==
In August 2000, the Aqaba Special Economic Zone Authority (ASEZA) was established which acted as the statutory institution empowered with administrative, fiscal, regulatory and economic responsibilities.

=== Administrative divisions ===
Jordan is divided into 12 administrative divisions, each called a Governorate. Aqaba Governorate divides into 3 Districts, some of which are divided into Subdistricts and further divided into villages.

== Economy ==
With status as Jordan's special economic zone, Aqaba's economy is based on the tourism and port industry sectors. Aqaba's location next to Wadi Rum and Petra has strengthened the city's location on the world map and made it one of the major tourist attractions in Jordan. The city is administered by the Aqaba Special Economic Zone Authority, which has turned Aqaba into a low-tax, duty-free city, attracting several mega projects like Ayla Oasis, Saraya Aqaba, Marsa Zayed and expansion of the Port of Aqaba. They are expected to turn the city into a major tourism hub in the region. Industrial and commercial activities remain important, due to the strategic location of the city as the country's only seaport.

Aqaba is the only seaport of Jordan so virtually all of Jordan's exports depart from here. Heavy machinery industry is also flourishing in the city with regional assembly plants being located in Aqaba such as the Land Rover Aqaba Assembly Plant. By 2008 the ASEZ had attracted $18bn in committed investments, beating its $6bn target by 2020 by a third and more in less than a decade. The goal was adjusted to bring in another $12bn by 2020, but in 2009 alone, deals worth $14bn were inked. Some projects currently under construction are:

- Marsa Zayed a $10 billion is the largest mega mixed-use development project ever envisioned in both Jordan and the region. Marsa Zayed will host facilities including residential neighborhoods, commercial outlets and amenities, entertainment venues, financial and business facilities, and a number of hotels. Additionally, the property will feature marinas and a cruise ship terminal. Marsa Zayed will encompass 6.4 million square meters of built-up property.
- Saraya Aqaba, a $1.5 billion resort with a man made lagoon, luxury hotels, villas, and townhouses that will be completed by 2017.
- Ayla Oasis, Ayla Oasis is a mixed-use waterfront development in Aqaba, southern Jordan, developed by Ayla Oasis Development Company (AODC), a subsidiary of the Astra group. It is located in the Al Nakhil area near Al Farouq Street, approximately 330 kilometers from the capital, Amman, roughly five minutes from Aqaba's city center and ten minutes from King Hussein International Airport. The development spans approximately 4.3 million square meters with a 235-meter waterfront along the Red Sea. Ayla Oasis adds approximately an additional 17 km of waterfront to the city’s shoreline through its lagoon system, which was developed by constructing a series of artificial lakes and lagoons with a total area of around 75 hectares, and represents a total investment of approximately US$2.1 billion. It includes lagoon-front, golf-front, and beachfront residential communities, as well as hotels, commercial spaces, and recreational facilities. The development also borders the archaeological site of Tell el-Kheleifeh. The project originated in 2002 when the Jordanian government allocated the 4.3 million square meter site in Aqaba for investment. Sabih Al-Masri established AODC through his Astra group in June 2003 to develop the project. Construction began in 2008 under the management of Sahl Dudin and was carried out in coordination with the Aqaba Special Economic Zone Authority (ASEZA). Ayla Oasis development comprises several residential communities, hotels, and serviced apartments, including the Azure Beach Apartments, Golf Residences, and Island Apartments, alongside international brands such as Hyatt Regency Aqaba Ayla and Cloud 7 Residence. The site features a world-class marina and recreational facilities like the Marina Village, provides a range of commercial and leisure services, categorized into dining and cafes, retail outlets, and fitness and beauty facilities. In addition to traditional and heritage-themed spaces, the area includes hospitality venues such as bars and snack outlets, alongside dedicated zones for specialized entertainment and cultural experiences. Beachfront amenities include specialized clubs such as B12 Beach Club and Mama Gaia. The destination also features an 18-hole championship golf course and a 9-hole academy course, both designed by Greg Norman. In addition to its physical infrastructure, the project incorporates technical training programs in hospitality and tourism through the Makarim Academy.
- Tala Bay, Tala Bay was developed in a distinctive architectural style that blends Jordanian and regional architecture with total cost of US$680 million. Another distinguishing feature of this single community resort is its two-kilometer private sandy beach on the Red Sea.
- The Red Sea Astrarium (TRSA), the world's only Star Trek themed park, worth $1.5 billion would have been completed by 2014 but cancelled in 2015.
- Port relocation. Aqaba's current port will be relocated to the southernmost part of the province near the Saudi border. Its capacity will surpass that of the current port. The project costs $5 billion, and it will be completed by 2013.
- Aqaba will be connected by the national rail system which will be completed by 2013. The rail project will connect Aqaba with all Jordan's main cities and economic centers and several countries like Saudi Arabia, Iraq, and Syria.
- The Aqaba Container Terminal (ACT) handled a record 587,530 twenty-foot equivalent units (TEUs) in 2008, an increase of 41.6% on the previous year. To accommodate the rise in trade on the back of the increasing popularity of container shipping and the stabilising political situation in Iraq, the Aqaba Development Corporation (ADC) has announced plans for a new port. The port relocation 20 kilometres (12 miles) to the south will cost an estimated $600m and will improve infrastructure, while freeing up space for development in the city. Plans for upgrading the King Hussein International Airport (KHIA) and the development of a logistics centre will also help position Aqaba as a regional hub for trade and transport.

=== Tourism ===
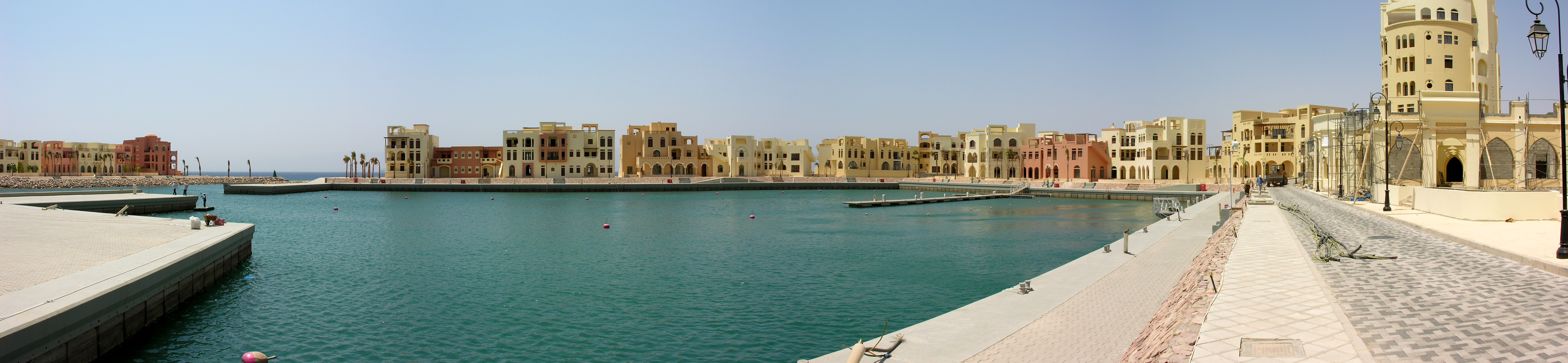
View of Tala Bay resort south of Aqaba

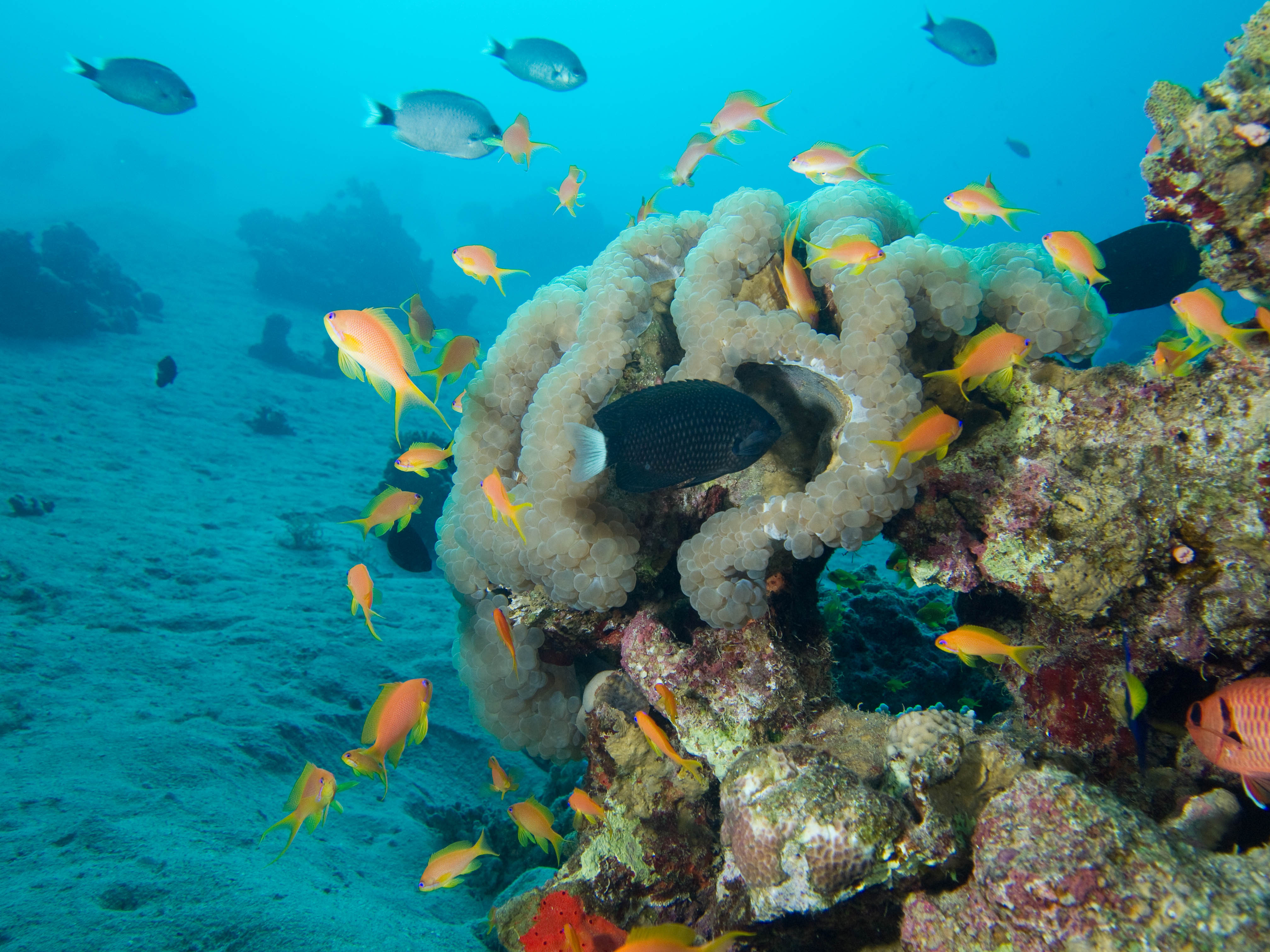
Aqaba's coral reefs have made it one of the best diving spots in the world

Aqaba has a number of luxury hotels, including in the Tala Bay resort 20 kilometres (12 miles) further to the south, which service those who come for fun on the beaches as well as Scuba diving. Aqaba offers more than thirty primary diving locations, with the majority of them accommodating divers of all skill levels. These diving sites comprise fringing reefs that extend for over 25 kilometres (16 miles), reaching all the way to the border with Saudi Arabia.

It also offers activities which take advantage of its desert location. Its many coffee shops offer mansaf and knafeh, and baqlawa desserts. Another very popular venue is the hamam built in 306 AD, in which locals and visitors alike come to relax after a hot day.

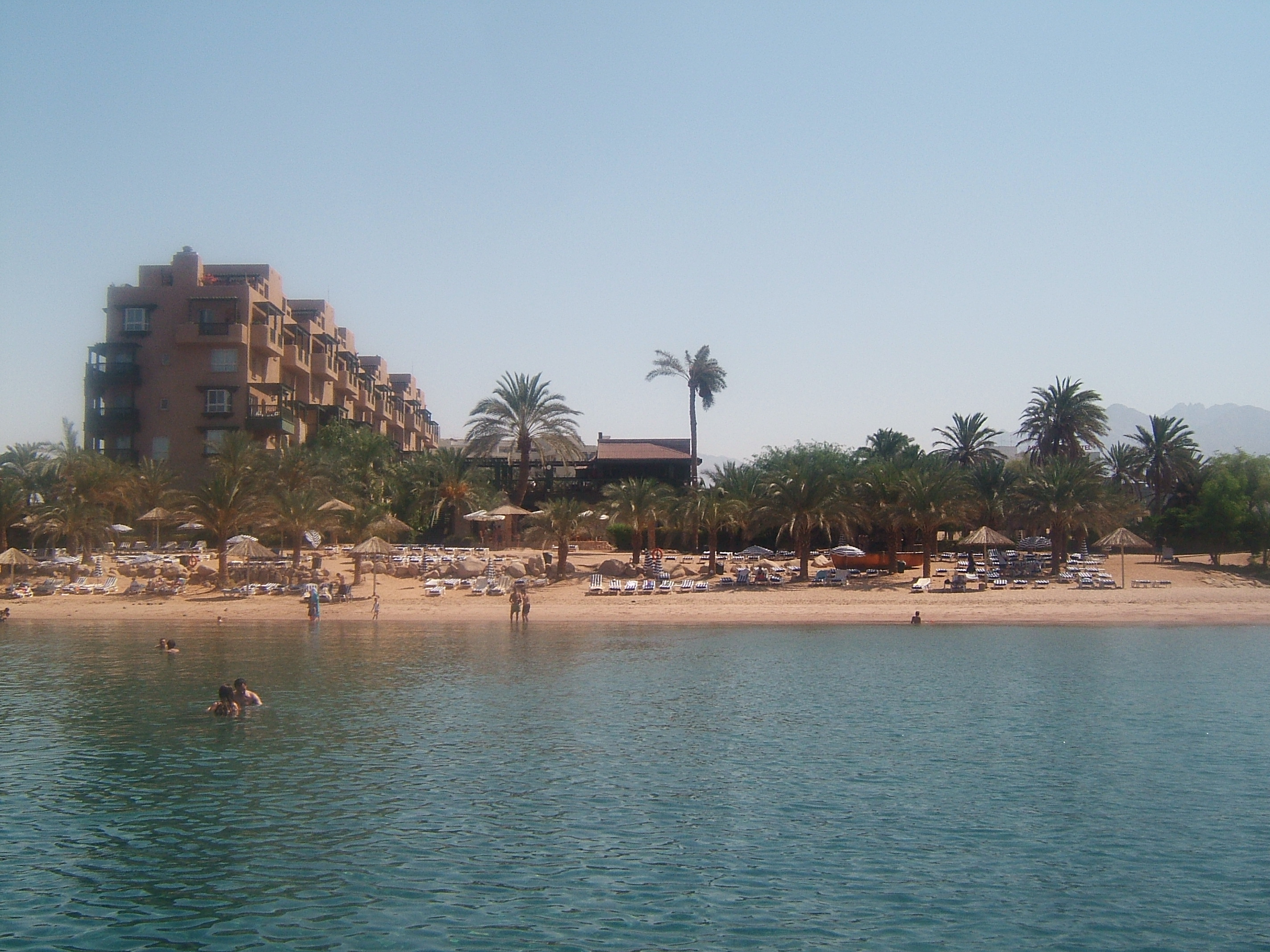
A beach in Aqaba.

In 2006, the Tourism Division of the Aqaba Special Economic Zone Authority (ASEZA) reported that the number of tourists visiting the Zone in 2006 rose to about 432,000, an increase of 5% over previous year. Approximately 65%, or 293,000 were Jordanians. Of foreign tourists, Europeans visited the Zone in the largest numbers, with about 98,000 visiting during the year. The division has financed tourism advertising and media campaigns with the assistance of the European Union.

Aqaba has been chosen for the site of a new waterfront building project that would rebuild Aqaba with new man-made water structures, new high-rise residential and office buildings, and more tourist services to place Aqaba on the investment map and challenge other centers of waterfront development throughout the region.

Aqaba was chosen as the Arab Tourism City of 2011.

During the 5-day holiday at both the end of Ramadan and Eid Al-Adha, Jordanian and western expats flock into the city with numbers reaching up to 50,000 visitors. During this time the occupancy rate of most hotels there reaches as high as 90%, and are often fully booked.

The several development projects (i.e. Ayla, Saraya etc.) now taking place in Aqaba provide "opportunities of empowerment" for local populations that want to expand their agency within the city. According to Fulbright scholar Kimberly Cavanagh development projects will help exhibit the ways global- local partnerships and the resultant cultural exchanges, can result in mutually beneficial outcomes.

== Demographics ==
The city of Aqaba has one of the highest population growth rates in Jordan in 2011, and only 44% of the buildings in the city had been built before 1990. A special census for Aqaba city was carried by the Jordanian department of statistics in 2007, the total population of Aqaba by the census of 2007 was 98,400. The 2011 population estimate is 136,200. The results of the census compared to the national level are indicated as follows:

Demographic data of the city of Aqaba (2007) compared to Kingdom of Jordan nationwide
		Aqaba City (2007)	Jordan (2004 census)
1	Total population	98,400	5,350,000
2	Growth rate	4.3%	2.3%
3	Male to Female ratio	56.1 to 43.9	51.5 to 48.5
4	Ratio of Jordanians to Foreign Nationals	82.1 to 17.9	93 to 7
5	Number of households	18,425	946,000
6	Persons per household	4.9	5.3
7	Percent of population below 15 years of age	35.6%	37.3%
8	Percent of population over 65 years of age	1.7%	3.2%

=== Religion ===
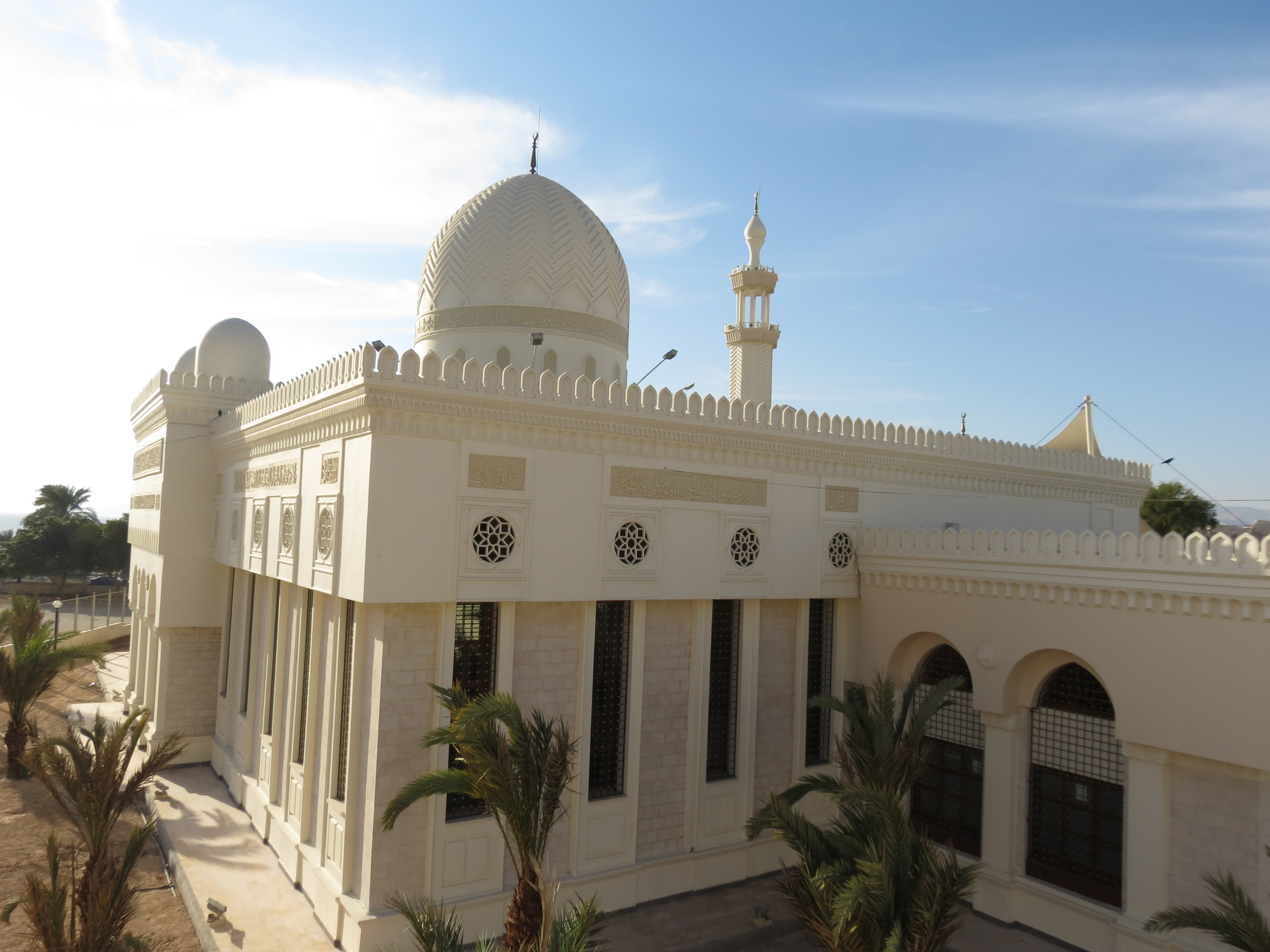
Mosque at Marsa Zayed

ِIslam represents the majority of the population of Aqaba, but Christianity still exists today. Approximately 5,000 Christian families live in the city. There are several churches in the city and multiple Christian schools including Rosary Sisters School Aqaba.

== Cityscape ==
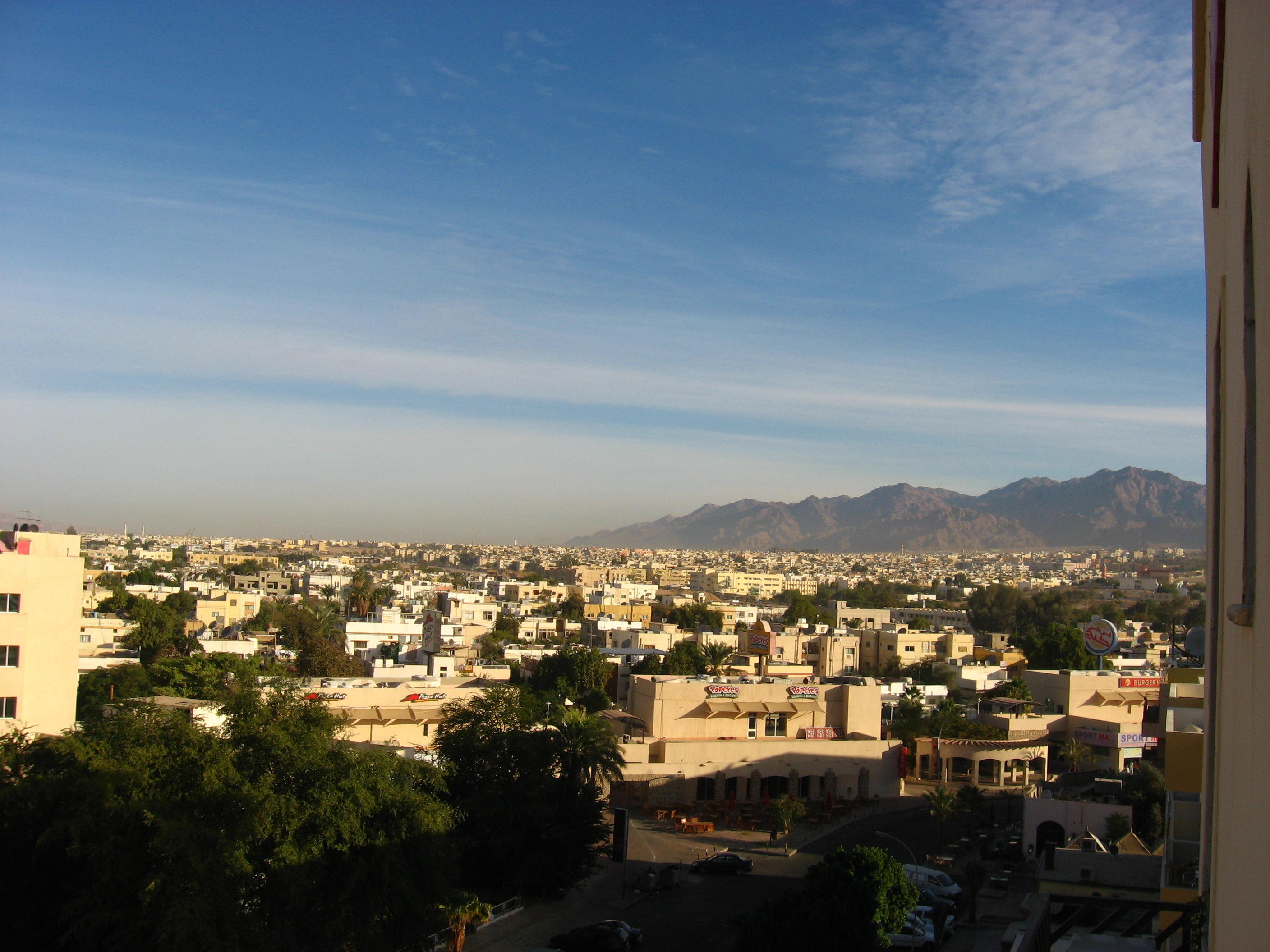
Skyline of Aqaba

Residential buildings in Aqaba are made up of 4 stories, of which are covered with sandstone or limestone. The city has no high-rises; however, Marsa Zayed project is planned to dramatically change that reality through the construction of several high-rise towers that host hotels, residential units, offices and clinics.

== Culture ==
=== Museums ===
The largest museum in Aqaba is the Aqaba Archaeological Museum.

=== Lifestyle ===
Aqaba has recently experienced a great growth in its nightlife, especially during the dramatic increase of tourist number in the 2000s.

== Transport ==
=== Rail ===
The Aqaba railway which transported phosphate to the old port ceased operations in 2018. A successor line to transport phosphate from Al Shidiya and Ghor es-Safi to the new terminal in Port of Aqaba is planned through an agreement between Jordan's Ministry for Transport and Etihad Rail.

There has been propositions to connect Eilat to Aqaba by rail.

=== Airports ===
King Hussein International Airport is the only civilian airport outside of Amman in the country, located to the north of Aqaba. It is a 20-minutes drive away from the city center. Regular flights are scheduled from Amman to Aqaba with an average flying time of 45 minutes which is serviced by Royal Jordanian Airlines and Jordan Aviation Airlines. Several international airlines connect the city to Istanbul, Dubai, Alexandria, Sharm el-Sheikh, and other destinations in Asia and Europe. Since the 1994 Peace Treaty between Israel and Jordan, there were plans to jointly develop airport infrastructure in the region. However, when Israel built Ramon Airport only 10 km distant from King Hussein International Airport, this happened without consulting the Jordanian side, which caused a slight deterioration of bilateral relations between the two countries and concerns over the safety of having two airports so close together.

=== Roads ===
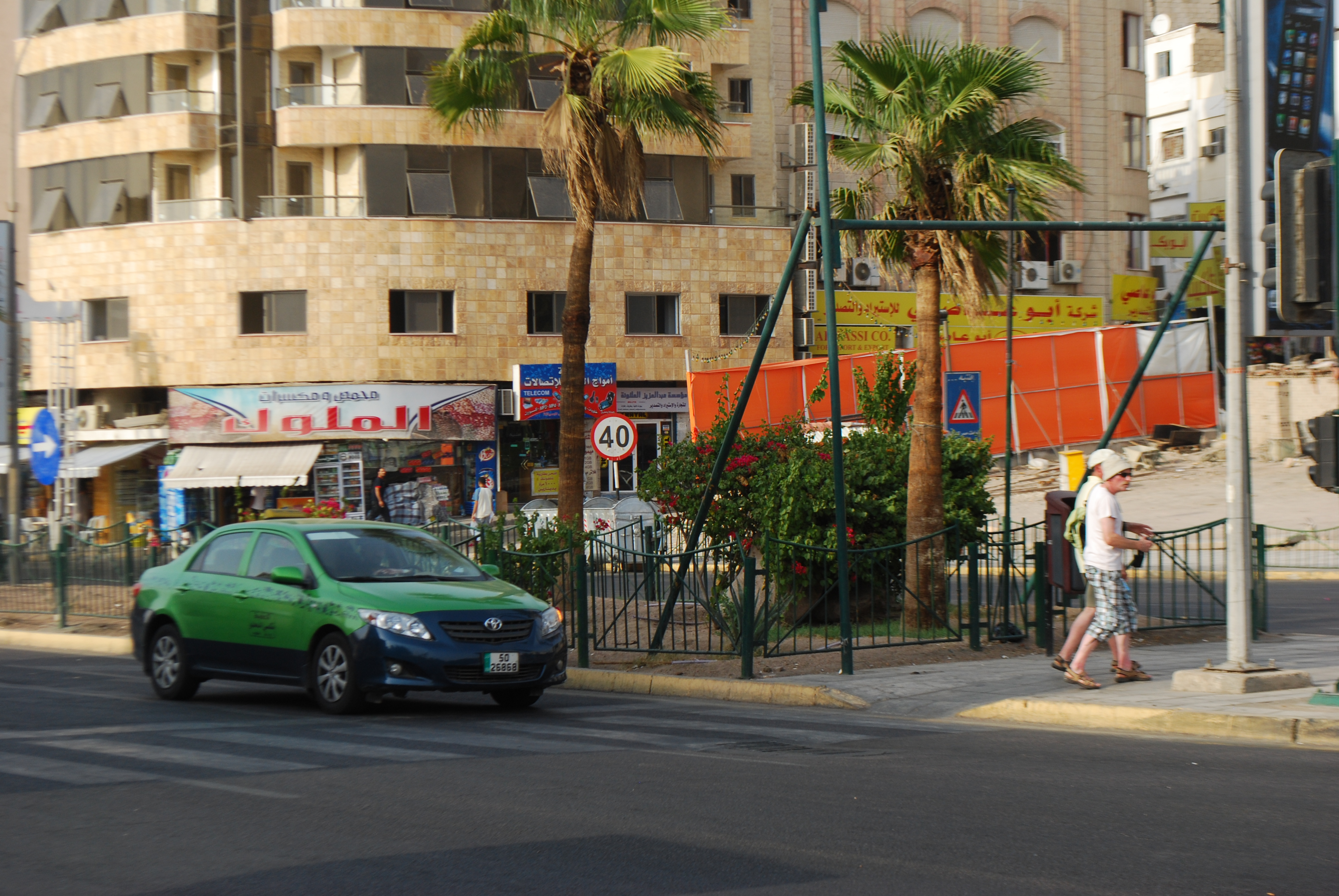
Taxis in Aqaba

Aqaba is connected by an 8,000 kilometres (5,000 mi) modern highway system to surrounding countries. The city is connected to the rest of Jordan by the Desert Highway and the King's Highway that provides access to the resorts and settlements on the Dead Sea. Aqaba is connected to Eilat in Israel by taxi and bus services passing through the Wadi Araba crossing, as well as to Haql in Saudi Arabia by the Durra Border Crossing. There are many bus services between Aqaba and Amman and the other major cities in Jordan, JETT and Trust International are the most common lines. These tourist buses are spacious and installed with air conditioning and bathrooms.

=== Port ===
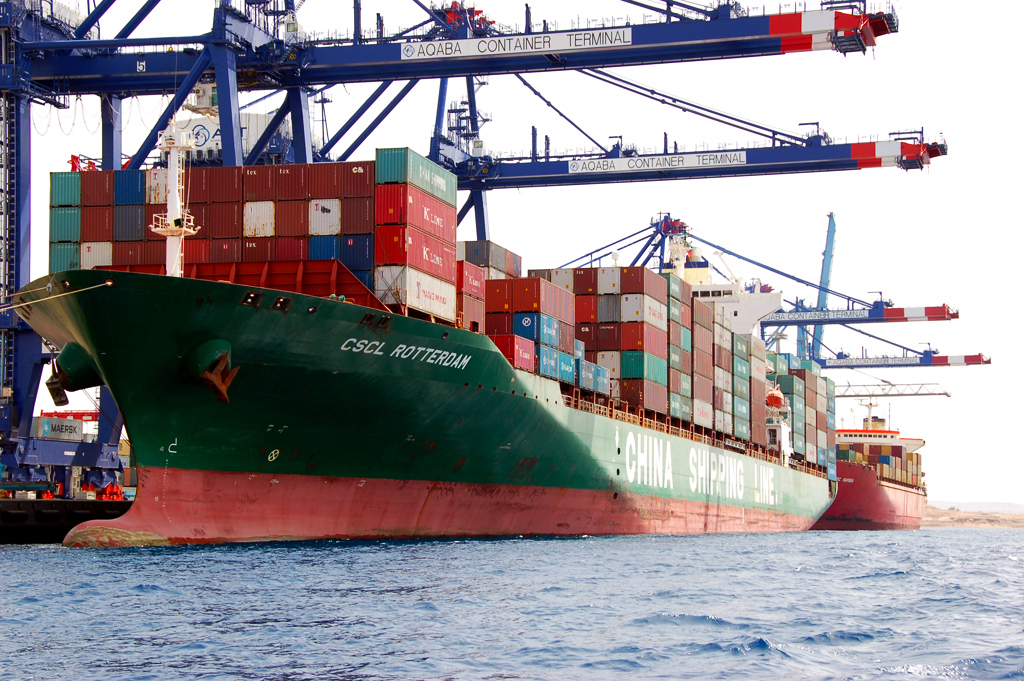
The Port of Aqaba is the only port in Jordan.

The Port of Aqaba is the only port in Jordan. Regular ferry routes to Taba are available on a daily basis and are operated by several companies such as Sindbad for Marine Transportation and Arab Bridge Maritime. The routes serve mainly the Egyptian coastal cities on the gulf like Taba and Sharm Al Sheikh. In 2006, the port was ranked as being the "Best Container Terminal" in the Middle East by Lloyd's List. The port was chosen for its recent improvements and its ability to handle local traffic as well as international traffic to four neighboring countries.

== Wildlife ==
The Gulf of Aqaba is rich with marine life. The gulf is home to approximately 500 fish species, with many being permanent residents, like lion fish and octopus, while others are migratory, typically appearing during the summer, such as sailfish, considered the fastest fish in the ocean, as well as the world's largest fish, the whale shark. Marine mammals and reptiles also inhabit the gulf during summer, hawksbill sea turtles, and bottle nosed dolphins call Aqaba's gulf home as well. A large number of predatory shark species used to inhabit Aqaba's gulf but, due to overfishing and pollution, this population is in decline. While mostly deep water sharks such as the tiger sharks and thresher sharks are present, there are also a small number of reef sharks as well. The world's fastest shark, the short-fin mako shark is the most commonly caught species by fishermen in Aqaba. Whale sharks, locally known as Battan, are the most commonly sighted. Conservationists are working hard to protect Aqaba's shark population.

The gulf of Aqaba hosts more than 390 bird species including migratory birds such as the greater flamingo, great white pelican and the pink-backed pelican.

== Education ==
There is a University of Jordan Aqaba Branch.

== Twin towns – sister cities ==
Aqaba is twinned with:

- Alcamo, Italy
- Basra, Iraq
- Hammamet, Tunisia
- Saint Petersburg, Russia
- Sharm El Sheikh, Egypt
- Ürümqi, China

== Gallery ==
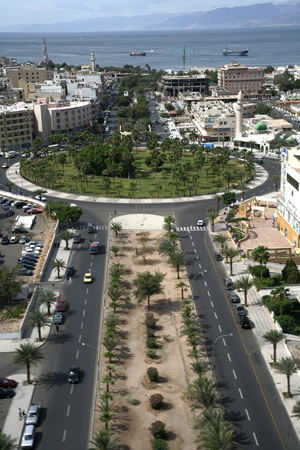
View of Aqaba

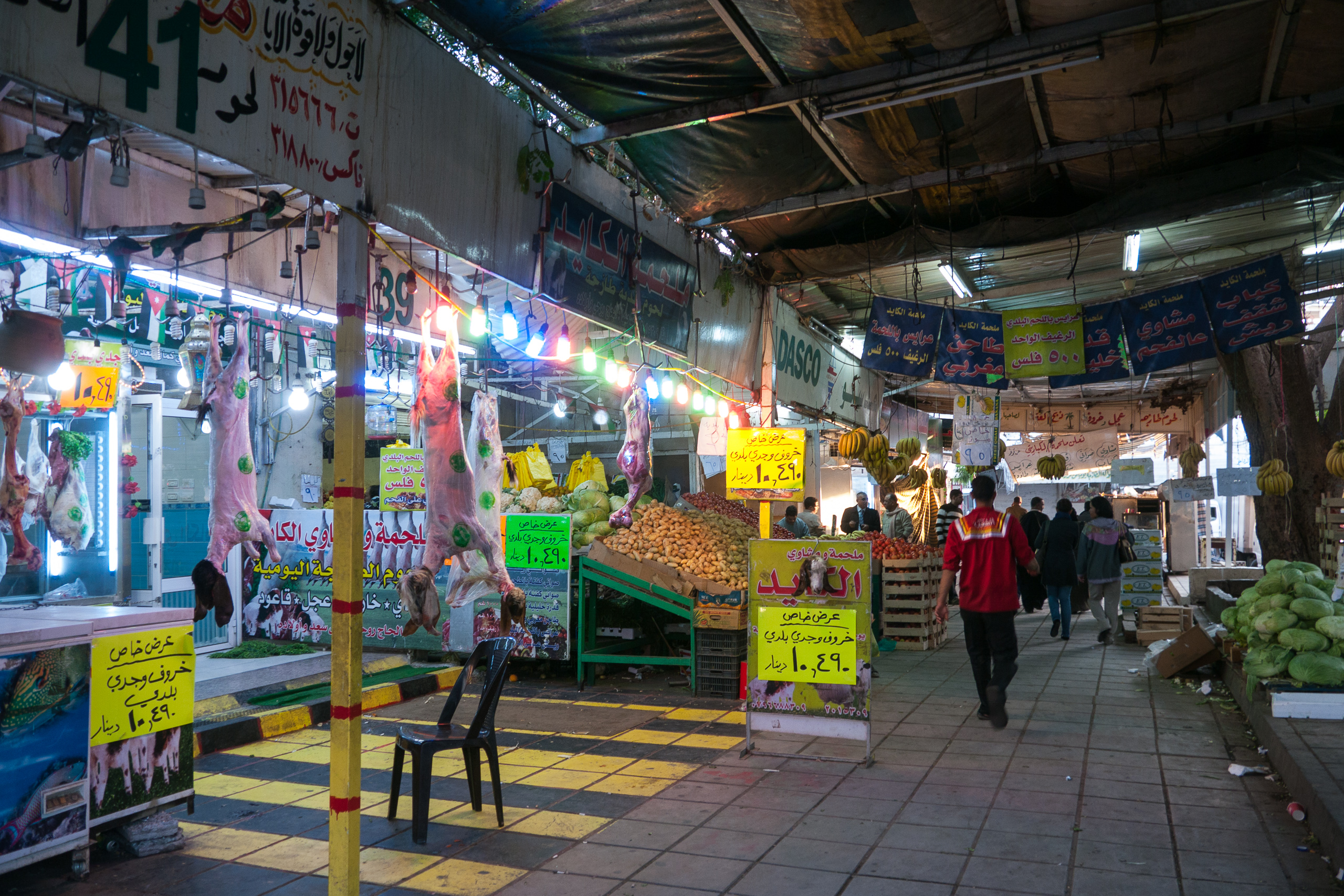

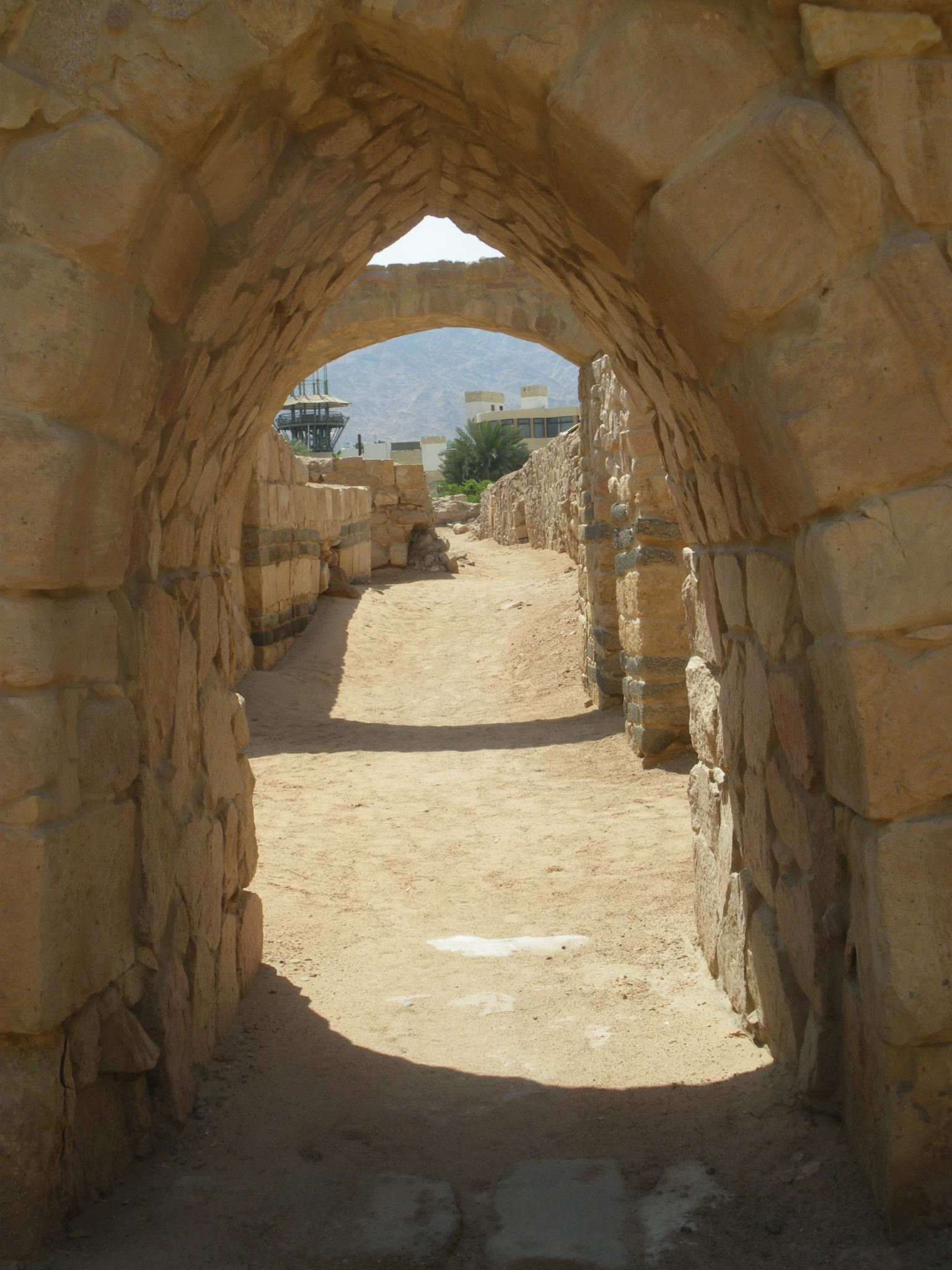
The Eastern Gate of the ruins of Ayla

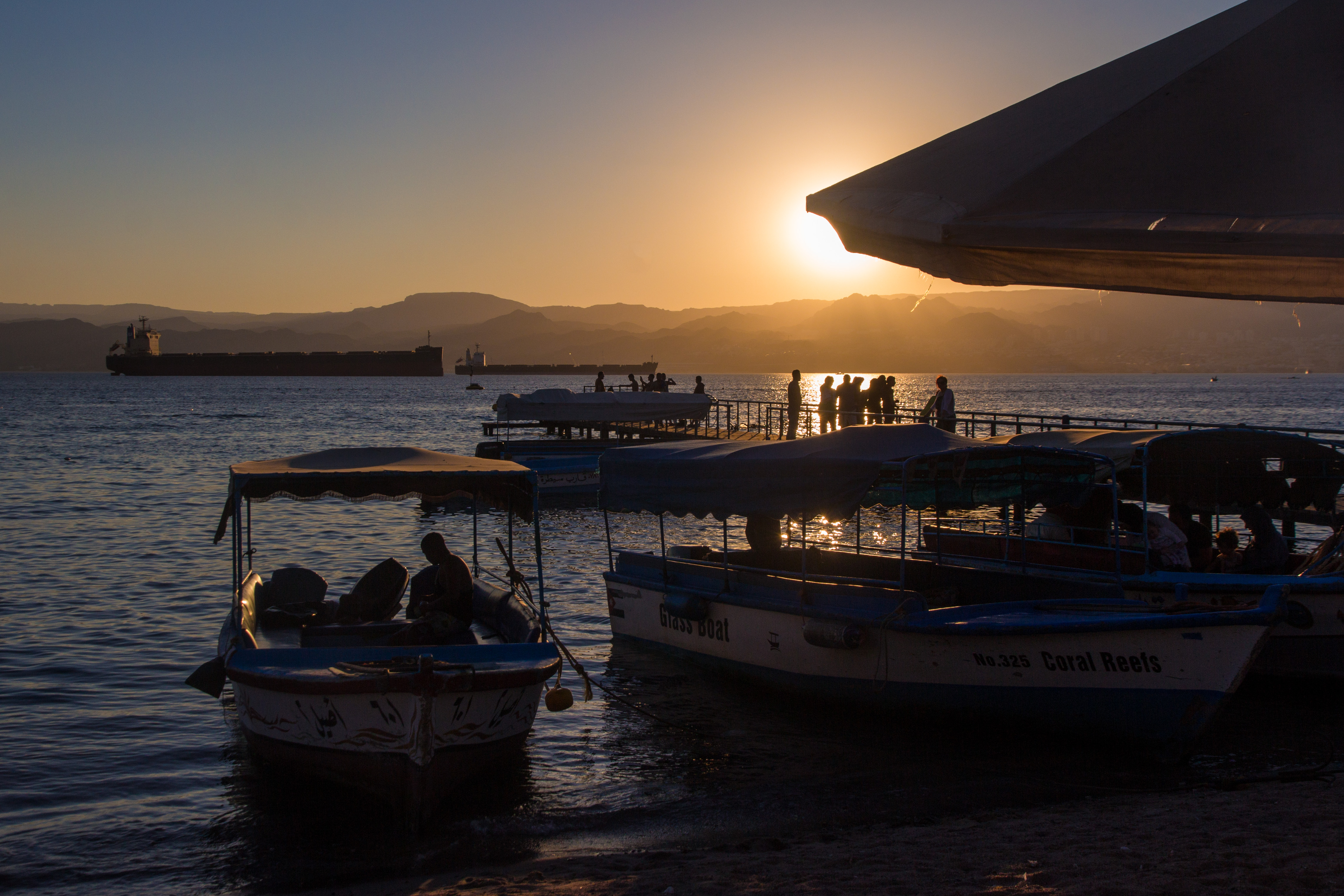
Sunset

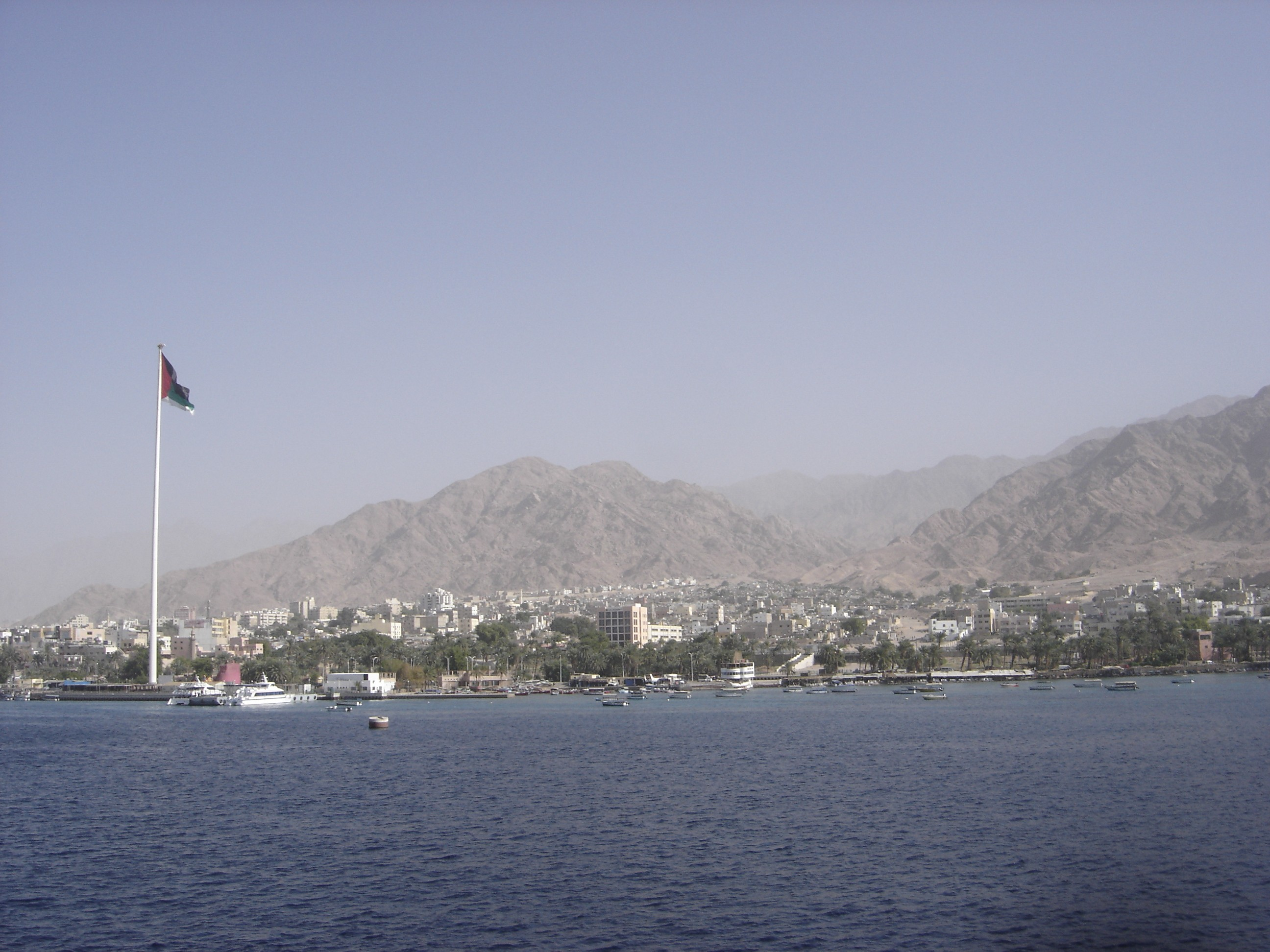
View of the city

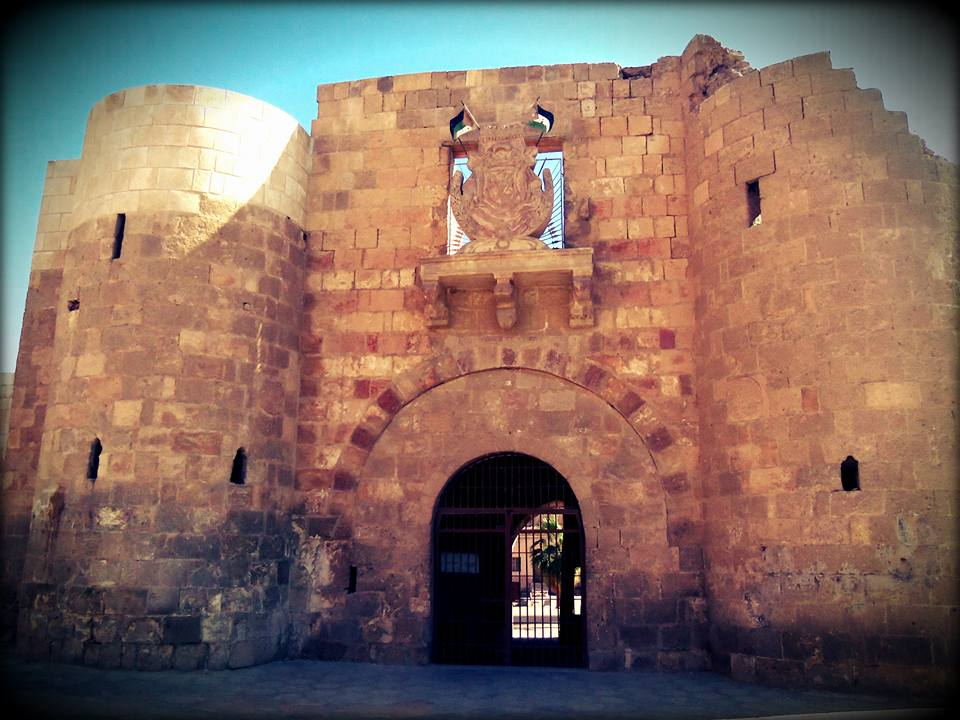
Aqaba fort

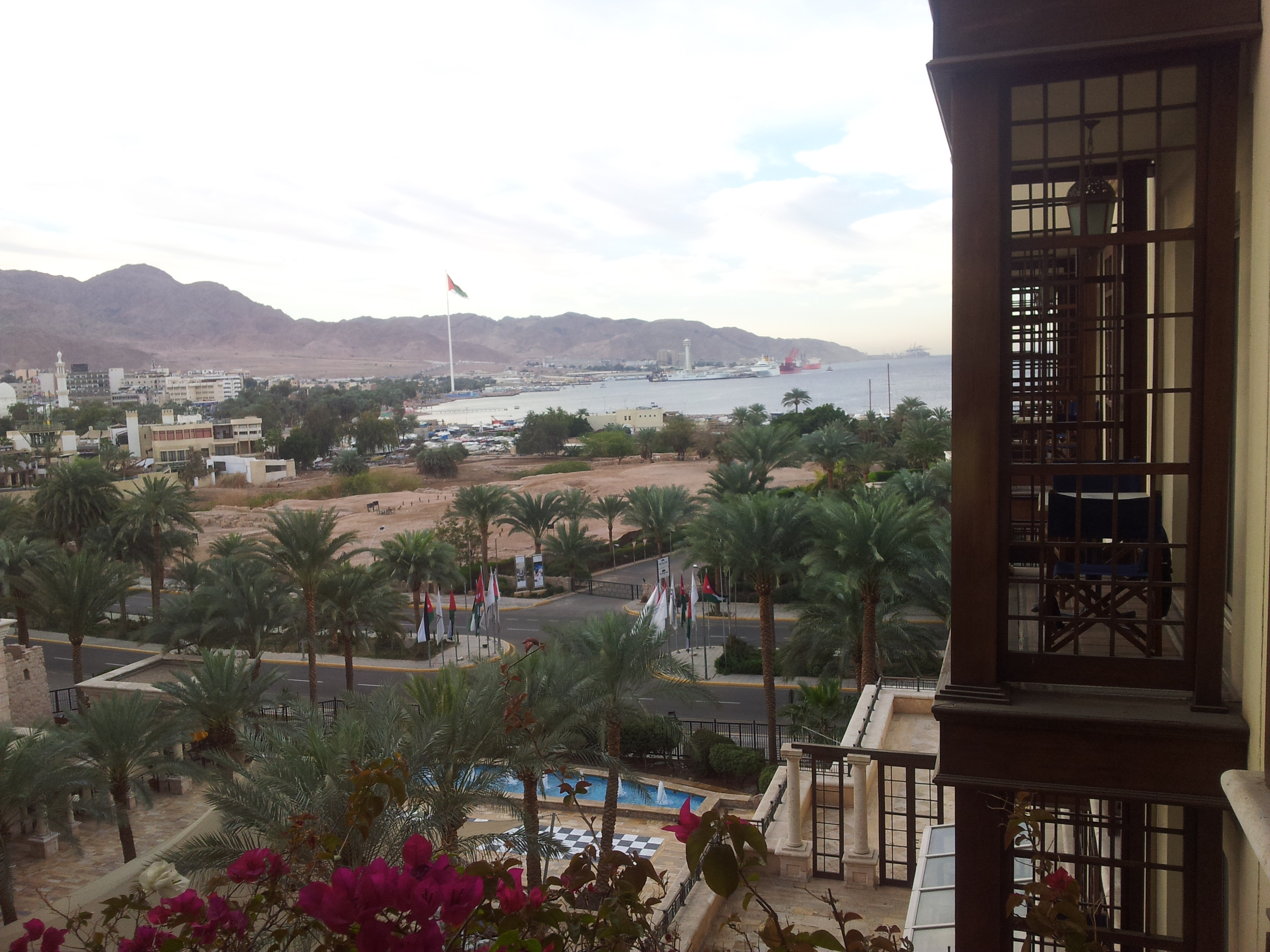
View of Aqaba

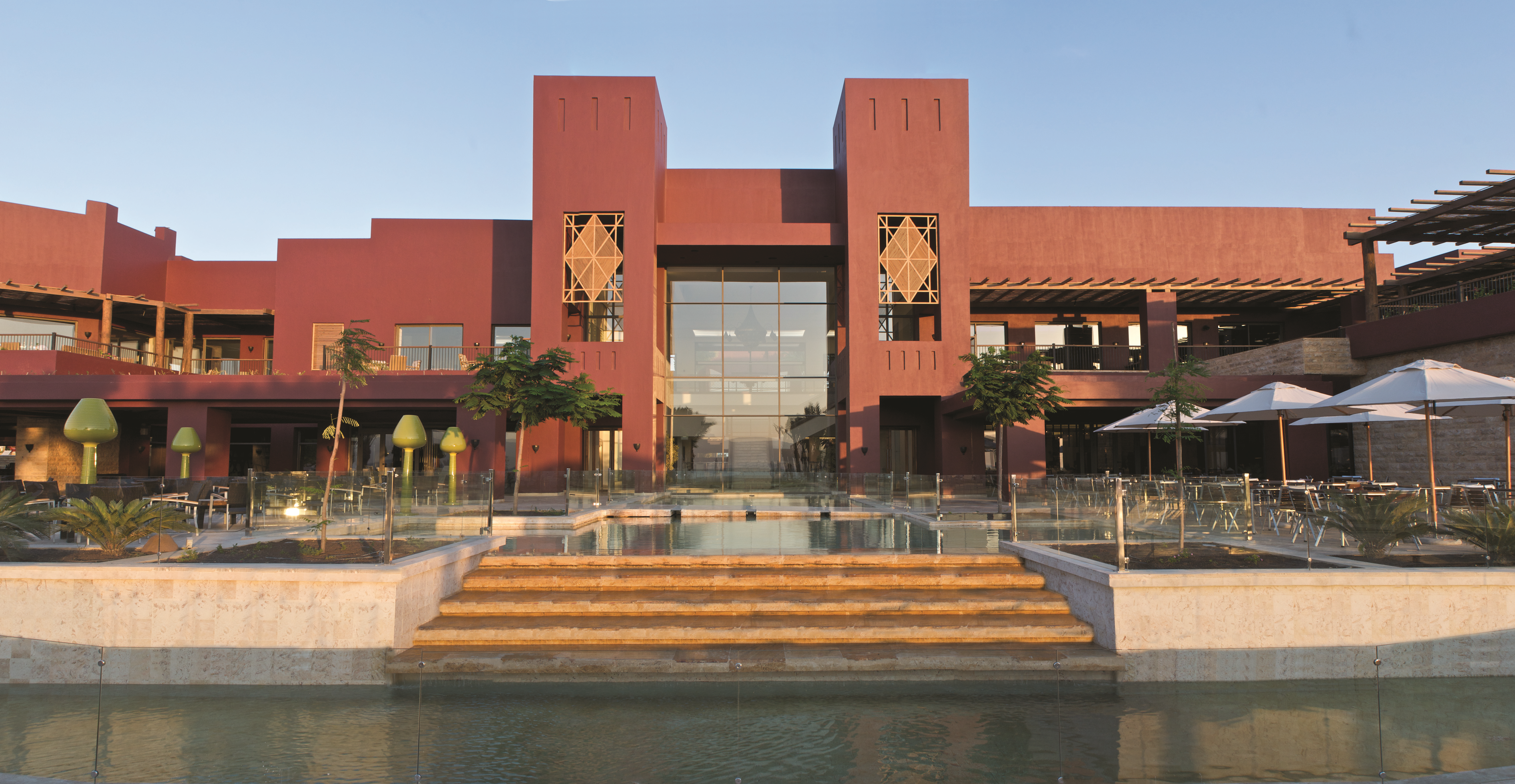
One of the resorts in the city

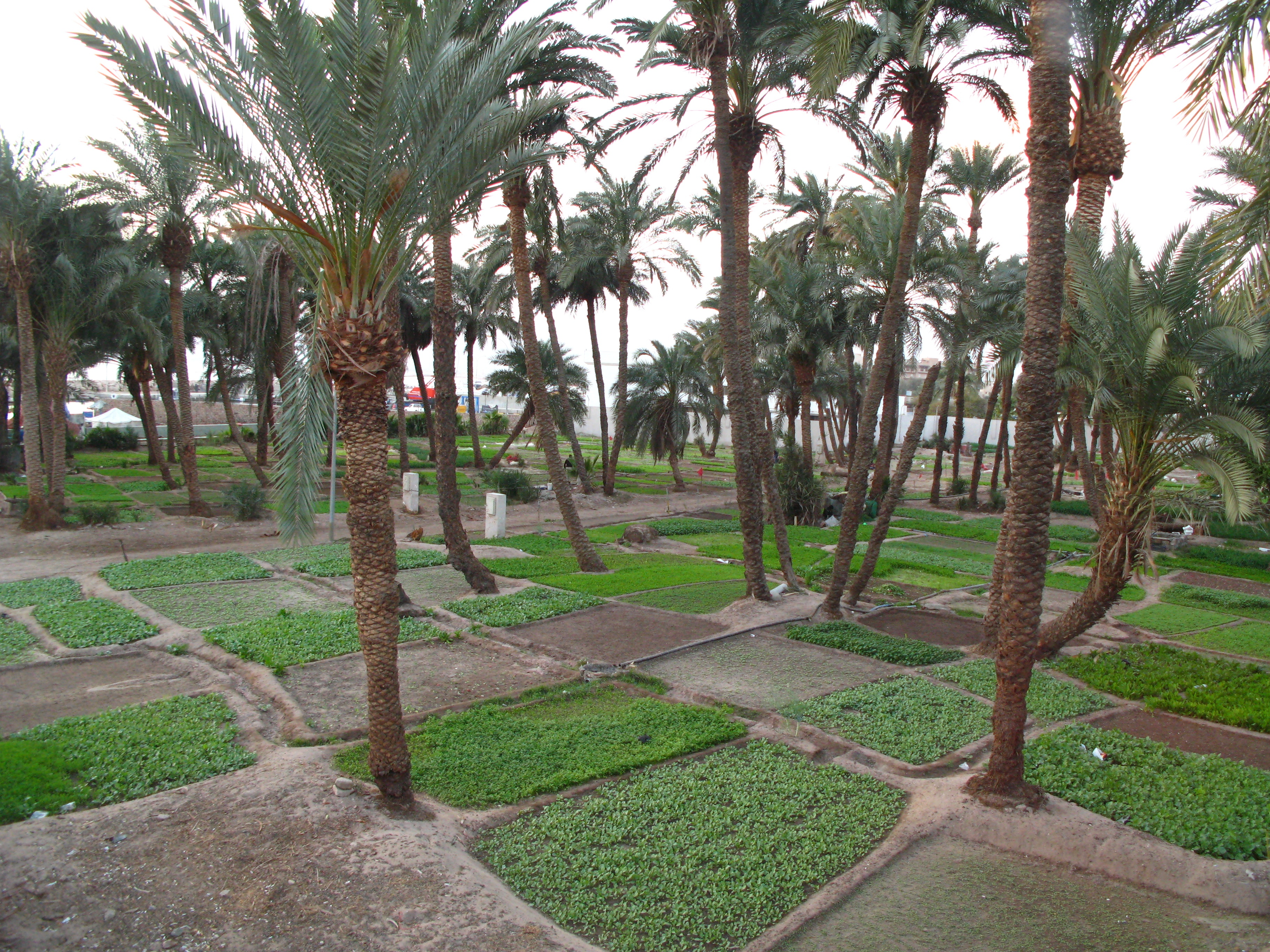
Shatt Al-Ghandour gardens

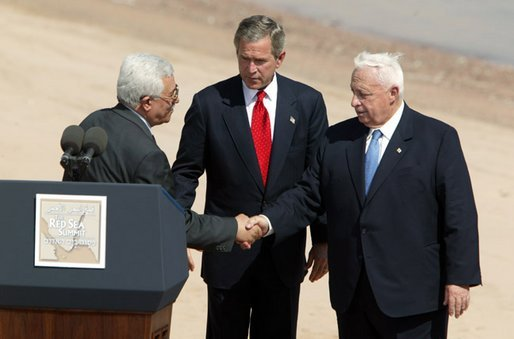
The Red Sea Summit in Aqaba in 2003

== Bibliography ==
- Parker, S. Thomas (1997). "Preliminary Report on the 1994 Season of the Roman Aqaba Project". Bulletin of the American Schools of Oriental Research, 305, pp. 19–44.
- Whitcomb, Donald (1988). Aqaba: Port of Palestine on the China Sea. Amman: Al-Kutba.
- Whitcomb, Donald (1994). Ayla: Art and Industry in the Islamic Port of Aqaba. Chicago: Oriental Institute, University of Chicago.
- Whitcomb, Donald (1997). "The Town and Name of Aqaba: An Inquiry into the Settlement History from an Archaeological Perspective". Studies in the History and Archaeology of Jordan, 6, pp. 359–363.
- Retzleff, Alexandra (2003). "A Nabataean and Roman Domestic Area at the Red Sea Port of Aila". Bulletin of the American Schools of Oriental Research, 331, pp. 45–65.
- Dolinka, Benjamin J. (2003). Nabataean Aila (Aqaba, Jordan) from a Ceramic Perspective: Local and Intra-regional Trade in Aqaba Ware during the First and Second Centuries AD. BAR International Series 1116. Oxford: Archaeopress.
- Rucker, John D., and Tina M. Niemi (2005). "New Excavations of the City Wall at Islamic Ayla in Aqaba, Jordan". Annual of the Department of Antiquities of Jordan, 49, pp. 501–508.
- Thomas, Ross; Parker, S. Thomas; and Niemi, Tina M. (2007). "Structural Damage from Earthquakes in the Second–Ninth Centuries at the Archaeological Site of Aila in Aqaba, Jordan". Bulletin of the American Schools of Oriental Research, 346, pp. 59–77.
- Whitcomb, Donald (2010). "Ayla at the Millennium: Archaeology and History". Annual of the Department of Antiquities of Jordan, 54, pp. 167–176.
- Parker, S. Thomas (2021). "Nabataean and Roman Coarse Ware Cooking Pottery from Aila (Aqaba, Jordan)". Polish Archaeology in the Mediterranean, 30(2), pp. 655–680.

== See also ==
- Aqaba Special Economic Zone Authority
- Disi Water Conveyance Project
- Midian

== Bibliography ==
- Mayhew, Bradley (April 2006) [1987]. Jordan (6th ed.). Footscray: Lonely Planet. ISBN 1-74059-789-3.
- Government of Jordan, Department of Statistics (1964). First Census of Population and Housing. Volume I: Final Tables; General Characteristics of the Population (PDF).
