= Yazan K. Mahadin =

Jordanian architect and landscape architect

- Citizenship: Jordanian
- Education: Cairo University, Mississippi State University
- Occupation: Landscape architect
- Father: Kamel Mahadin

Yazan K. Mahadin is a Jordanian landscape architect. He served as Commissioner for Petra Archaeological Park and Tourism at the Petra Development and Tourism Region Authority (PDTRA) in Jordan from October 2024 to September 2026.

== Education ==
Mahadin graduated from Cairo University with a bachelor's degree in architecture. He later did his postgraduate studies in landscape architecture at Mississippi State University, USA.

While still at Mississippi State University, Mahadin was part of a student team that received second prize in the Site Design category of the United States Environmental Protection Agency's 2013 Campus RainWorks Challenge.

== Career ==
Mahadin started his career as a landscape architecture working with MK Associates, an architectural and landscape architecture practice founded by his father, Kamel O. Mahadin in Jordan. He later became the chief executive officer of the firm.

In 2019, Mahadin engaged in an international architectural design competition organised by Archicontest alongside his brother Amer Mahadin and other designers from MK Associates. Their two proposed designs which were meant for a sports centre in Manhattan, New York, won first and third place awards, during the competition event.

In 2023, Mahadin alongside his father, Kamel O. Mahadin worked on the development of the Bethany Beyond the Jordan baptism site. He discussed plans geared towards preserving the native vegetation of the site and introducing sustainable featurers such as solar energy and the like.

Mahadin also joined the advisory board of the Middle East Landscape Sustainability Awards in the same 2023.

=== Public service ===
Between October 2024 and September 2026, Mahadin served as Commissioner for Petra Archaeological Park and Tourism at the Petra Development and Tourism Region Authority (PDTRA) in Jordan. During his tenure, he intervened for tourists during heavy rainfall and flash floods in the Petra region.

In February 2026, Mahadin, alongside the chief commissiober of the Petra Development and Tourism Region Authority met with Bajram Begaj, the president of Albania during his official visit to Petra.

In April 2026, Mahadin signed an MOU on behalf of the PDTRA with the American Center of Research and Global Digital Heritage establishing a partnership focused on digital documentation of Petra Archaeological Park and its surroundings.

In September 20, 2026, Mahadin resigned from the Petra Development and Tourism Region Authority (PDTRA) voluntarily. The Jordanian Cabinet accepted his resignation.

== See also ==
- Kamel Mahadin
- Petra
