= 2022 Aqaba toxic gas leak =

2022 toxic gas leak in Aqaba, Jordan

- Date: 27 June 2022
- Location: Aqaba New Port, Jordan; 29°21′46.5″N 34°57′45.5″E
- Also known as: Port of Aqaba
- Cause: Chemical storage container fell onto a docked ship in the port and ruptured, spilling 25 tons of chlorine
- Deaths: 13
- Injuries: 265

On 27 June 2022, a toxic gas leak occurred at the Port of Aqaba, Jordan, when a container carrying 25 tons of chlorine fell from a crane onto a docked ship and ruptured. The incident killed at least thirteen people and injured more than 265 people.

== Accident ==
On 27 June 2022, 16:15 local time, a crane was loading one of several pressurized chemical storage containers onto the container ship Forest 6 for export to Djibouti. The crane's cabling system failed, and one container, containing about 25 tonnes (55,000 lb) of chlorine, fell onto the ship and ruptured, causing the chemical to burst from the container. A cloud of bright yellow gas spread throughout the port as people ran away. This accident caused thirteen deaths and 265 injuries at the port.

According to Haj Hassan, deputy chief of the Aqaba Region Ports Authority, an "iron rope carrying a container containing a toxic substance broke, resulting in the fall and escape of the poisonous substance". The ship was waiting to load an additional 20 containers with high percentage chlorine.

A video of the incident was posted to Twitter by Jordanian state TV and another by the newspaper Al Ghad.

== Response ==
Chlorine gas is toxic to humans. When inhaled and mixed with moisture within the human body, it creates hypochlorous and hydrochloric acid, both of which can create oxygen free radicals that break down cell walls in the pulmonary system, which can lead to irritation under mild exposure, but can be as toxic to create pulmonary edema, acute respiratory distress syndrome, chronic respiratory problems, and death.

The port was immediately evacuated while first responders worked to give medical attention to affected dock workers. The injured were transported to two state hospitals, a field hospital, and a private facility. Aqaba health director Jamal Obeidat said that Aqaba hospitals were full and that the "injured people are in medium to critical condition". Information Minister Faisal Al Shboul said the government sent a field hospital and medical equipment. According to state media at least one plane evacuated wounded to Amman.

Israeli defense minister Benny Gantz offered assistance saying "As we've told our friends in Jordan, the Israeli defense establishment is ready to assist with any effort, by any means necessary".

Though the port was far from the city, and slow winds prevented the gas from spreading, city health official took precaution and instructed residents to close their windows and stay inside. The highway patrol blocked all roads leading to Aqaba. A nearby tourist beach, only 7 kilometres (4.3 mi) from the port, was evacuated and closed. The port's grain storage and processing units were also shut down as to inspect the storage for any contamination from the chlorine gas. The rest of the port was expected to return to operations once it was deemed safe to return.

== Investigation ==
Prime Minister Bisher Al-Khasawneh instructed the Interior Minister to head an inquiry into the accident.

The Prime Minister later informed the cabinet that the investigation revealed “great deficiency and negligence in safety protocols for dealing with hazardous materials in the Aqaba port.” As a result, senior port officials including the director general of state-owned Aqaba Company for Ports Operation and Management and other port officials were dismissed from service. They had delegated critical safety related tasks to untrained personnel.

The investigation revealed that the accident was caused by "lack of conformity" of the cargo sling's load rating with the weight of the cargo. The wire rope sling was rated at 8.5 tonnes but it was used to hoist four 25-tonne containers of chlorine from the pier to the ship in a row prior to it breaking. The wire rope parted while loading the fifth container which weighed 28.9 tonnes.

The Interior Minister Mazin Abdellah Hilal Al Farrayeh stated that the results of the investigation will be handed to the public prosecutor.
