= Kamel Mahadin =

Jordanian architect (born 1954)

Kamel Mahadin كامل محادين
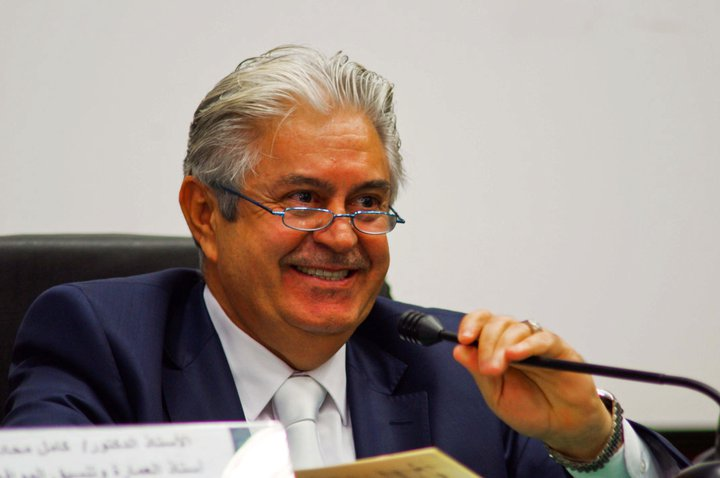

Senator at the House of Senate
- In office November 2014 – October 2016

Chief Commissioner of Aqaba Special Economic Zone Authority
- In office August 2012 – November 2014
- Preceded by: Nasir Al Madadha
- Succeeded by: Hani Mulki

Minister of Water and Irrigation
- In office March 1999 – June 2000

Personal details
- Born: 24 June 1954 (age 72) Karak, Jordan
- Spouse: Khalida Maaitah
- Children: Tariq, Yazan, Amer, Tamara
- Website: www.kamelomahadin.com

Kamel Mahadin (Arabic: كامل محادين; born June 24, 1954) is a Jordanian architect, landscape architect, professor, author, and artist. He was the Chief Commissioner of Aqaba Special Economic Zone Authority (ASEZA) and was a Jordanian senator at The House of Senate.

== Personal life ==
Kamel Mahadin is the son of Ottallah Mahadin a retired governor and his mother Huryeh Al Usta. In 1982, he married Khalida Maaitah, with whom he has three sons: Tariq, Yazan, Amer and one daughter Tamara. Apart from Arabic, Mahadin is fluent in English.

== Educational life ==
Kamel was born in Karak, Jordan in 1954, finished secondary education at the high school of Mafraq, Jordan and received a scholarship from the United States Agency for International Development to study architecture at the American University of Beirut. After four years, his scholarship was transferred to the United States due to war in Lebanon. He received his bachelor's degree in architecture from Kansas State University, his master's degree in landscape architecture from Louisiana State University and his doctorates in environmental designs were awarded from Texas A & M University.

He worked as a campus planner for Louisiana State University and later as a visiting lecturer at Texas A&M University. In 1987, he returned to Jordan and began teaching at the Department of Architecture at University of Jordan, where he served as department chairman from 1991 to 1995. In 1987, then founded M K Associates; Jordan's only specialized landscape design firm. Over a period of twenty years, he served as a landscape consultant for Amman Greater Municipality, Mutah University, Al-El Beit University and the Ministry of Tourism and served as a landscape consultant to the Royal Court. In January 1997 he became Director General to Petra Regional Council, and in 1999 took the portfolio as the Ministry of Water and Irrigation. In June 2000, he came back to teaching and practicing landscape design, running M.K. Associates; a landscape design firm. Practiced design in the United States, the Persian Gulf and the Middle East. With a wide range of published articles in his field. Kamel is a registered landscape architect in the US. He is registered at the International Federation of Landscape Architects, the American Society of Landscape Architects (Texas and Louisiana) and Jordan Society of Architects and Engineers.

As of August 2, 2012, Mahadin was appointed chief commissioner of Aqaba Special Economic Zone Authority. He subsequently withdrew from his position as chairman of MK Associates and MEALA.

He was chairman of the board – Aqaba Development Corporation (ADC), chairman of the board – Aqaba Container Terminal (ACT), chairman of the board of Aqaba Airports Company (King Hussein International Airport) and board trustee member of the Tafilah University.

In November 2014, a royal decree was issued approving the Cabinet's acceptance of Kamel Mahadin's resignation as of November 8, while another decree was issued appointing him as senator as of November 9.

In October 2017, Mahadin was named a Fellow of the American Society of Landscape Architects ASLA following a nomination by the organization's Council of Fellows Executive Committee.

In November 2019, Mahadin bagged a "Life Time Achievement Award" at the First Landscape Middle East Awards Ceremony in Dubai, United Arab Emirates. The event was dedicate to the memory of Dr Musa Nimah (1942-2016). The awards ceremony honored those who through their dedication, creativity and relentless efforts, have left a positive impact on the landscape profession in the region.

== Published research, articles ==
- "MK Associates, The landscape Architects" Al Rayeh Al Hashimeyah Magazine, Issue 30, Oct. 2006.
- "The Mastermind of Landscape ". I celebrating Jordan, issue 13, August, 2006.
- Mahadin, Kamel O., "Urban Greening, a missing notion ". I celebrating Jordan, issue 11, June, 2006.
- Mahadin, Kamel O., "Reading Jordan's Landscape: Missing Lessons". Ekistics, 2006.
- Mahadin, Kamel O., Abo Ghanimah, Landscape Design: A Tool for Improving the Middle East Built Environment" accepted for publication, Ekistics, 2006.
- Abo Ghanimah, Ali, Mahadin, Kamel O., Alshboul, Abdulsalam, March 2006, "Symbolic and Geometrical Transformation of Stalactite Design in Modern Jordanian Architecture", accepted for publication in Disegnare, Rome University, "la Sapienza", Italy.
- Mahadin, Kamel O., Abo Ghanimah, Al-Najarr, Al-Ejel, "People's Perception and Behavior Patterns in Amman Publics Parks and Plazas", Alexandria University Journal, Alexandria University Egypt, March, 2005.
- Mahadin, Kamel O., "The House, a Place for creativity" Al-Bait Al-Khaliji, vol. 1, issue 2 Jan. 2005.
- Mahadin, Kamel O., " Architectural Islands in The Mediterranean, Dimensions, vol. 2, issue 6 Sep. 2005.
- Mahadin, Kamel O., "Landscape design with Middle East", Dimensions, vol. 1, issue 1 Jan. 2004.
- Mahadin, Kamel O., Abo Ghanimah, Ali. 2004. "Quest for Quality", published in disegnare, Rome University, "la Sapienza", Italy, n. 29/2004.
- Mahadin, Kamel O., " Landscape Architecture, A Form of Architecture and Construction Art, Dimensions, issue 1 Oct. 2003.
- Fethi, Ihsan and Mahadin Kamel O., "Villa Architecture in Amman Current Spectrum of Styles, Presented at " Amman: The City and it Society", 1996, University of Jordan.
- Kadhim, Mohamad and Mahadin, Kamel O., " The Concept Of An Archaeological Park at the Citadel of Amman " Ekistics, Athens, vol. 60 .No. 368/369, 1994.
- Al-Adhami, Monther, and Dr. Mahadin, Kamel O., "Issues Around The Contemporary Arab City". Open House, Vol. 1, Issue 1, 1994.
- Mahadin, Kamel O., "Regionalist Architecture in Jordan: A Critical Review". Open House International, Vol. 19, Issue 1, 1994.
