= Marsa Zayed =

Jordanian development project

Marsa Zayed is a $10 billion redevelopment project in Aqaba, Jordan. Named after Sheikh Zayed Bin Sultan Al Nahyan, the project is planned to include hi-rise residential units, hotels, and retail facilities, as well as entertainment and financial districts. The project was said to have been launched in 2010, although only in early 2025 was the lead developer appointed. This lead developer is MAG Group Holding, based in Dubai. Phase 1 of the project is to begin with the Zayed Riviera, consisting of four towers which will include a hotel as well as private residences, a beach club, a marina and a yacht club.
