= Aqaba Special Economic Zone Authority =

Agency overview
- Formed: 2001
- Jurisdiction: Government of Jordan
- Headquarters: Aqaba (Jordan)
- Agency executive: President
- Website: http://www.aqabazone.com

The Aqaba Special Economic Zone Authority (ASEZA) is the financially and administratively autonomous institution responsible for the management, regulation, and the development of the Aqaba Special Economic Zone (ASEZ).

== History ==
The Aqaba special economic zone or ASEZA (Arabic: سلطة منطقة العقبة الاقتصادية الخاصة) was inaugurated in 2001 as an initiative by the government of Jordan to ensure that Aqaba’s commercial and cultural prominence develops to be a regional hub for trade, tourism, and culture. Six ministerial-level commissioners, each responsible for a major area of regulatory or operational activity, govern the ASEZ. ASEZA is a service–oriented organization offering one-stop assistance covering all investment needs.

== Master plan ==
In 2002, ASEZA adopted a comprehensive master plan that encompasses development activities in the Zone for the promotion of portal, urban, tourist, commercial, academic, and other investment sectors. Developed planning already covers five special areas:

Aqaba Town

- Modern architecture is to complement the old city traditional elements, thus creating a cultural environment and opportunities for investors in the tourist, commercial, and residential areas of development. Ayla Oasis is a mixed-use waterfront development in Aqaba developed by Ayla Oasis Development Company (AODC), a subsidiary of the Astra group. It is located in the Al Nakhil area near Al Farouq Street. The development spans approximately 4.3 million square meters with a 235-meter waterfront along the Red Sea. Ayla Oasis adds approximately an additional 17 km of waterfront to the city's and includes lagoon-front, golf-front, and beachfront residential communities, as well as hotels, commercial spaces, and recreational facilities. The project originated in 2002 when the Jordanian government allocated the 4.3 million square meter site in Aqaba for investment. Sabih Al-Masri established AODC through his Astra group in June 2003 to develop the project. Construction began in 2008 under the management of Sahl Dudin and was carried out in coordination with the Aqaba Special Economic Zone Authority (ASEZA). The site features a marina and recreational, commercial and leisure facilities, including cafés, retail outlets, and fitness and beauty facilities. Beachfront amenities include specialized clubs such as B12 Beach Club and Mama Gaia. The destination also features an 18-hole championship golf course and a 9-hole academy course, both designed by Greg Norman.

Port Areas

- The Aqaba Port Areas include the Main Port, the Container Port and the Southern Industrial Port. According to the Master Plan, a common location—the Main Port—is established to merge the three existing port area activities into one expanded entertainment, residential, hotel and cruises service center.

Coral Coastal Zone

- The Coral Coastal Zone is undergoing a wide residential, hotel and entertainment facilities construction process for the development of an advanced community resort, with respect to relative beach and coral reef protection requirements.

Southern Industrial Zone

- The Zone extends along the Southern Industrial Zone Port and consists of reorganized and expanded current sites. New transportation systems, including a railway terminal, will serve the developed area.

Airport Industrial Zone

- Ideal for industrial facilities, permitted land uses in the Zone include logistics and distribution, high-tech industries, warehousing, light manufacturing, showrooms, office complexes and airport-related business activities.

The Master Plan aims at preserving natural resources within the construction frame. It comprises several zones and reserves for the protection of Aqaba's cultural, archaeological, historical and natural heritage and diversity. Areas include: Five environmental zones, coral reserves, archaeological reserves, natural area reserves and a Beach Protection Zone.

== Aqaba International Laboratories ==
Aqaba International Laboratories - BEN HAYYAN was established under the EU funded programme “IS-ASEZA”, to support ASEZA in guiding the Aqaba Special Economic Zone towards becoming a dynamic and attractive engine of economic growth, enhancing public health and streamlining trade in the zone, Jordan and the region. The Ben Hayyan Aqaba International Laboratories offer analytical and advisory services for food and environment, operating under two interdependent units: the food safety and practical environmental science laboratories.

== Aqaba Development Corporation ==
Aqaba Development Corporation (ADC) was launched by ASEZA and the Government of Jordan at the beginning of 2004. ADC owns Aqaba's seaport, the airport and strategic parcels of land as well as the development and management rights for these assets.

== Chief Commissioners ==
As of 2019, Aqaba Special Economic Zone has had 8 chief commissioners:

- June 2016 – present: Nasser Shraideh
- Nov 2014 - Jun 2016: Hani Mulki
- Aug 2012 - Nov 2014: Kamel Mahadin
- 2011 - Aug 2012: Nasir Al Madadha
- 2010 - 2011: Mohammed Saqer
- 2007-2010: Husni Abu Ghaida
- 2004-2007: Nader Dahabi
- 2002-2004: Akel Biltaji

== See also ==
- Qualifying Industrial Zone
