= The Red Sea Astrarium =

Cancelled Jordanian theme park

The Red Sea Astrarium (TRSA) was a planned integrated resort destination on the shores of the Red Sea. It would have been the first themed entertainment attraction at the coastal city of Aqaba, Jordan. It was announced in 2011, for a projected 2014 opening. Construction stopped on this theme park in early 2015, and the park was never completed or opened.

The key attractions were to include dining, retail, nightlife, rides, shows, museum exhibits, theme parks, water parks, interactive walk-throughs, and a 'Star Trek Experience' based upon the new Star Trek franchise.

In 2013, a signing ceremony was held at the Jordanian-American Business Forum under the patronage of King Abdullah II of Jordan. King Abdullah had suggested Star Trek be included in The Red Sea Astrarium, being a big Star Trek fan who had an uncredited cameo (as background Starfleet crewman) on an episode of Star Trek: Voyager in 1996.

According to Themeparx.com, construction was officially halted by March 2015 after having been started and postponed twice.

The $1.5 billion (USD) resort was designed by Rubicon Group Holding (RGH).

== Planned layout ==
The Red Sea Astrarium was planned to occupy 184-acre (70 hectares) of land. The resort's design featured three major zones of entertainment: The Summit, The Old Waterfront, and The New Waterfront. The resort was planned to feature four luxury hotels, botanical gardens, a collection of entertainment, dining areas, 4D cinema, 16 attractions and retail stores.

== Attractions ==
Planned attractions included:

- A time travel-themed flight simulator to the Wonders of the World
- A fountain and media nighttime show
- A 3D dome show
- A themed dining show featuring stage magic and illusion
- The Star Trek Experience
- A 600-seat theatre intended to house major touring or in-house productions
- VIP Cinemas
