= Port of Aqaba =

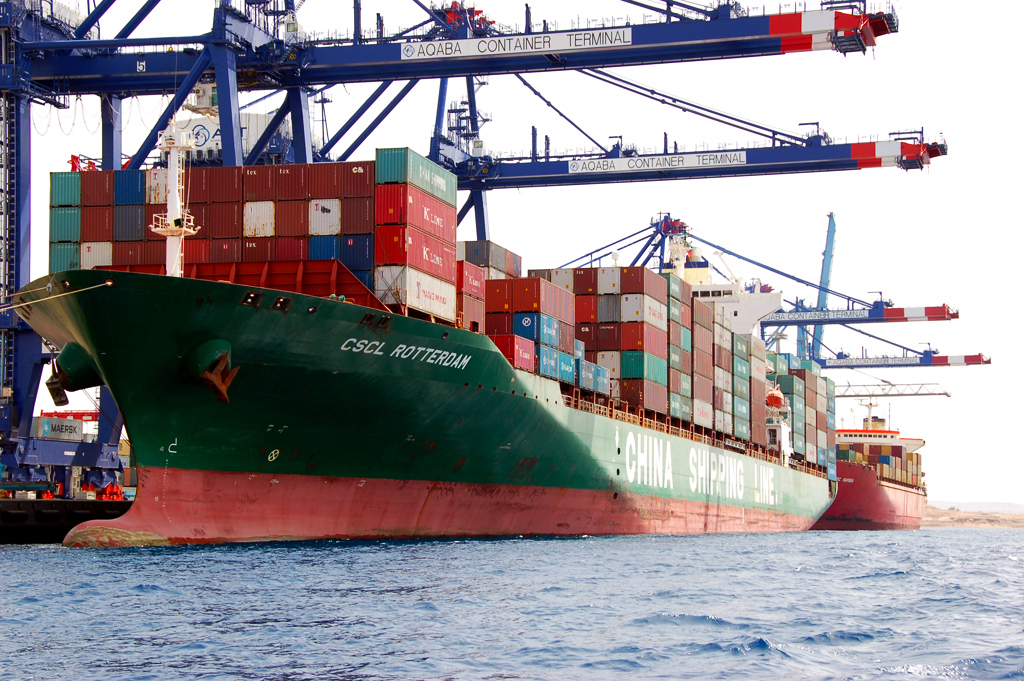
- Docked container ship at the port, 2010
- Interactive map of Port of Aqaba

Location
- Country: Aqaba, Jordan
- Coordinates: 29.5167°N 35°E
- UN/LOCODE: JOAQJ

Details
- Owned by: Aqaba Development Corporation

Statistics
- Annual cargo tonnage: 20 million tons
- Website http://www.adc.jo

The Port of Aqaba (Arabic: ميناء العقبة) is the only port in Jordan. It is owned by Aqaba Development Corporation (ADC). The port has 12 terminals operated by five operators: the Aqaba Company for port management and operation; Aqaba Container Terminal; Industrial Port Company; phosphate Company; National Electricity Power Company, and the pilotage operated by Aqaba Port Marine Services Company . MANAGED BY AD PORTS GP.

== History ==
Aqaba has been a major port since the Iron Age. The Bible refers to the area in 1 Kings 9:26: "King Solomon also built ships in Ezion-Geber, which is near Eloth in Edom, on the shores of the Red Sea," in which Eloth refers to a port on the grounds of Aqaba. The Aqaba port was particularly important after the Ottomans built the Hejaz railway, which connects the port to Damascus and Medina. Today, the economy of Aqaba is largely based around the port sector. Recently, an Abu Dhabi consortium of companies called Al Maabar has won the bid to relocate and manage the Aqaba port for 30 years and expand the existing ferry terminal which receives about 1.3 million passengers and thousands of trucks and cars coming from across the shore in Egypt.

=== Relocation ===
In 2006, the port was relocated from the city's centre to its south to access deeper water levels. The land of the previous port was sold to developers to establish a waterfront neighborhood and a business district.

== Aqaba Container Terminal ==
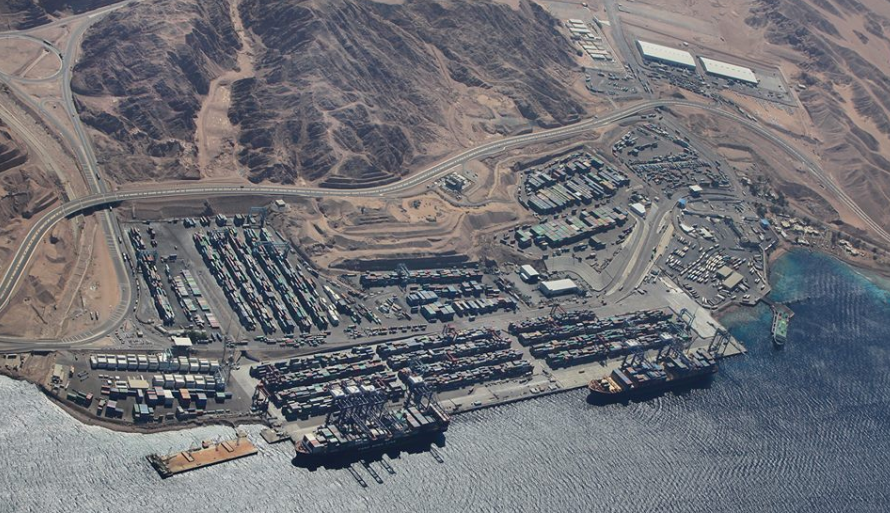
Aqaba Container Terminal, location 29.28°N 34.58°E

The port contains the Aqaba Container Terminal (ACT), Jordan's only container port, and the second-busiest facility on the Red Sea by container volume. The ACT is a logistics hub and an important part of the Jordanian economy. It is the primary gateway for the Jordanian market, and a crucial transit point for cargo moving between countries in the region.

The ACT is a joint venture between Aqaba Development Corporation and APM Terminals under a 25-year build-operate-transfer agreement that was signed in 2006. A terminal expansion project completed in October 2013 added 460 metres (1,510 feet) to the existing quay to create a total quay length of one kilometre (0.62 miles), increasing the annual container throughput capacity to 1.3 million TEUs. The expansion program, begun in 2009, has included the delivery of two new ship-to-shore cranes with a 22-container-row reach, and four rubber tyred gantry cranes.

In 2004, the Aqaba Development Corporation (ADC), on behalf of the Aqaba Special Economic Zone Authority (ASEZA), acquired and took over the management and operation of the terminal. In 2006, a 25-year Joint Development Agreement (JDA) was signed between ADC and ACT. Under this contract, APM Terminals Jordan is responsible for operating, managing and marketing ACT.
