= Elath =

Biblical city

Elath (Hebrew: אֵילַת, Modern: Elat, Tiberian: ʼÊláṯ; Latin: Aila; Ancient Greek: Ελά, Ἀηλά, Αἴλανα, Αἰλανίτης, Αἰλανή, Ἐλάνα, Αἴλανον, Αἰλάς, Αἰλάθ, Αἰλών, Ἡλάθ, Αϊλά), or Eloth, was an ancient city mentioned in several places in the Hebrew Bible on the northern tip of the Gulf of Aqaba. It was in the same vicinity as Ezion-Geber.

The name survived into the Roman period as Aela, adopted into Byzantine Greek as Aila and into Arabic as Aylah (the Arab settlement was built outside the ruins of the ancient city), later becoming Aqabat Aylah ("Aylah Ascent"), eventually shortened down to Aqaba.

The modern Israeli town of Eilat, established in 1951, is named for the ancient city.

== Name ==
The name derives from the West Semitic word *'ayl 'ram' with the feminine suffix -at. A Phoenician variant of the name אֵלוֹת is mentioned once in the Hebrew Bible in I Kings 9.26 reflecting the Phoenician vowel shift.

== Extrabiblical mentions ==
The original settlement was probably at the northern tip of the Gulf of Eilat. Ancient Egyptian records also document the extensive and lucrative mining operations and trade across the Red Sea with Egypt starting as early as the Fourth Dynasty of Egypt. Elath is mentioned in antiquity as a major trading partner with Elim, Thebes' Red Sea Port, as early as the Twelfth Dynasty. Trade between Elim and Elath furnished frankincense and myrrh, brought up from Ethiopia and Punt; bitumen and natron, from the Dead Sea; finely woven linen, from Byblos; and copper amulets, from Timna; all mentioned in the Periplus of the Erythraean Sea. In antiquity Elath bordered the states of Edom, Midian and the tribal territory of the Rephidim, the indigenous inhabitants of the Sinai Peninsula.

== Hebrew Bible ==
Elath is first mentioned in the Hebrew Bible in the Book of Exodus. The first six Stations of the Exodus are in Egypt. The seventh is Crossing the Red Sea and the 9th–13th are in and around Elath. Station twelve refers to a dozen campsites in and around Timna in the state of Israel near Eilat.

When King David conquered Edom, which up to then had shared a common border with Midian, he took over Eilat, the border city shared by them as well. The commercial port city and copper based industrial center were maintained by Egypt until reportedly rebuilt by Solomon at a location known as Ezion-Geber (I Kings 9:26). In 2 Kings 14:21–22, many decades later, "All the people of Judah took Uzziah, who was sixteen years old, and made him king in the room of his father Amaziah. He rebuilt Elath, and restored it to Judah, after his father's death." Later, in 2 Kings 16:6, during the reign of King Ahaz: "At that time the king of Edom recovered Elath for Edom, and drove out the people of Judah and sent Edomites to live there, as they do to this day."

According to the Bible (2 Kings 14:22), one of the earliest and most significant of King Uzziah's achievements, unless it has to be attributed to his predecessor Amaziah, was the recovery of Elath, which was later lost by Ahaz - all three 8th-century BCE kings of Judah.

The same Uzziah regained for Judah that command of the trade route of the Red Sea which Solomon had held, but which has subsequently been lost.

== See also ==
- Port of Eilat
