= Palestinian pottery =

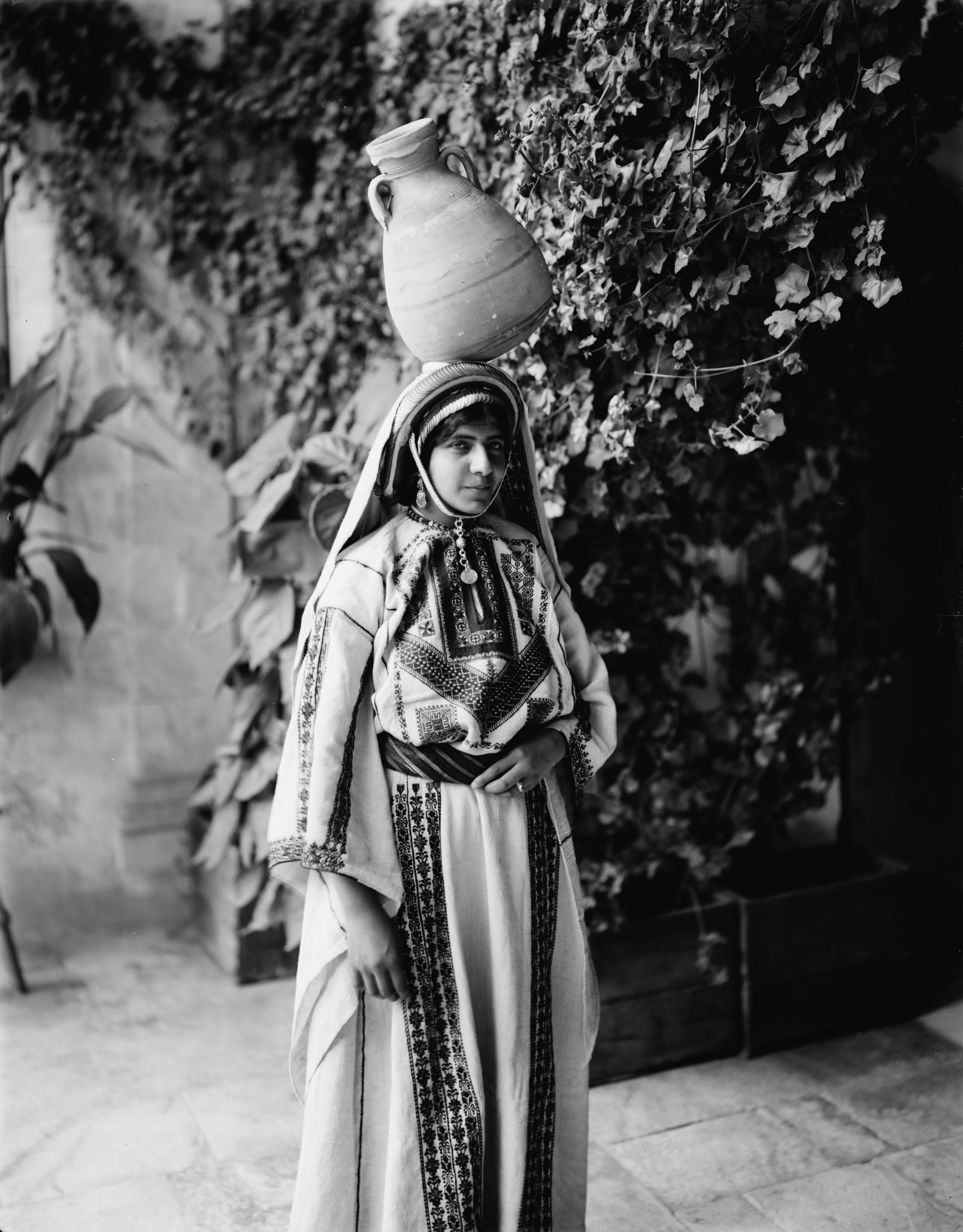
Girl in Ramallah dress balancing a jarra used for transporting and storing water (1914)

Palestinian pottery refers to pottery produced in the region of Palestine throughout the ages. It forms part of the wider tradition of Levantine pottery, though it is also a distinctive, living handicraft still produced by Palestinians today. The history and practice of the living craft is the focus of this article.

There is a definite continuity in the development of this handicraft throughout the many different eras in the history of Palestine in terms of the materials and forms used. Pottery was produced by both men and women, the former primarily in workshops using a potter's wheel, the latter largely working at home to produce essential household goods.

The pottery traditions have suffered from the Nakba and the encroachment of modern life and mass produced household goods and wares, which effectively ended the women's pottery tradition. The craft continues to be practiced by Palestinians in workshops on both sides of the Green Line and by artists seeking to preserve Palestinian culture in the diaspora.

== History ==
=== Continuity through the ages ===
Modern Palestinian pots, bowls, jugs and cups, are similar in shape, fabric and decoration to their ancient equivalents. Winifred Needler, Deputy Keeper of the Near Eastern Department at the Royal Ontario Museum of Archaeology writes in Palestine: Ancient and Modern (1949) that this continuity demonstrates "how persistently the potter's craft clung to tradition through the centuries". R. A. Stewart Macalister, in his work The Excavation of Gezer (1912), underlines this point prefacing his overview of Palestinian pottery throughout the ages by noting that:

"... the division into periods [of Palestinian pottery] is to some extent a necessary evil, in that it suggests a misleading idea of discontinuity—as though the periods were so many water-tight compartments with fixed partitions between them. In point of fact, each period shades almost imperceptibly into the next."

Commenting further on modern examples of Palestinian pottery, Needler notes that the clay used is of much the same composition as the ancient examples and is shaped, smoothed and baked in the same way, with the surfaces often decorated in similar painted, incised, or moulded techniques. "Ramallah" ware, a thick-walled, pinkish drab pottery painted with simple geometric and plant designs in red, is handmade; as are the "frying pan" and the home-made braziers. Other pottery is wheel-made, largely undecorated, but often with a glossy black glaze and crude designs in bright red.

An example of a regional type of pottery that was produced almost unchanged from the Early Bronze Age to the time of the Muslim conquest of Palestine and beyond is Negevite pottery produced by the nomadic pastoralists of the highlands of the Negev (Naqab) desert. This coarse, undecorated ware was centered on meeting household needs for cooking pots, and they were made without a wheel using the coiling method on a mat. The flat-bottomed pots had vertical or flared sides and were very similar to the Qurayya and Edomite pottery cooking pots, and were found alongside the former in abundance at mining sites in the Timna valley in Arabah. Because of its ubiquity throughout the ages, its presence in given strata alone is not very useful for dating purposes.

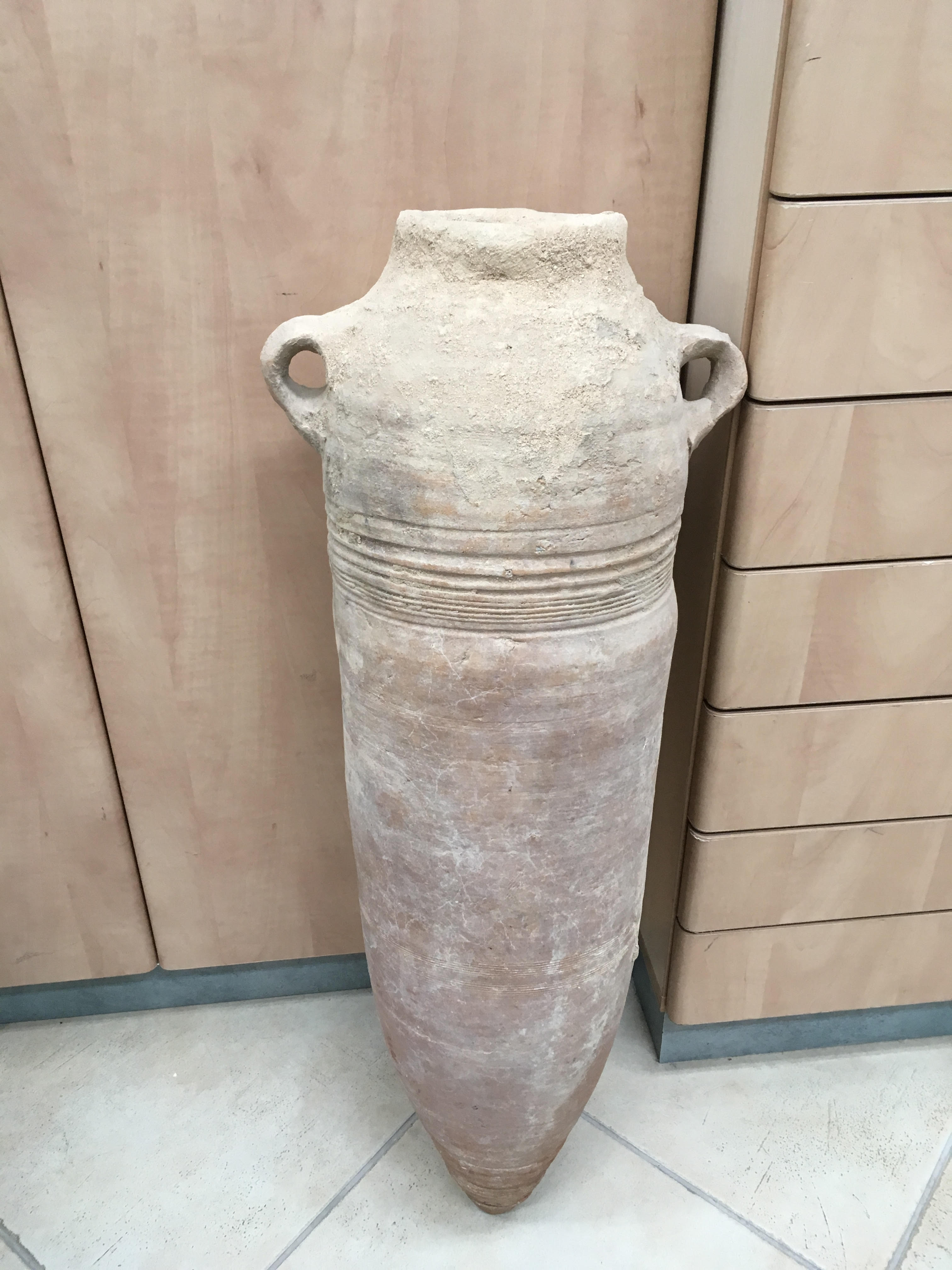
Gaza Jar, from the Collection of the Department of Archeology, University of Haifa. The picture shows a type 4.

One pottery vessel whose production emerged to meet a need for storage and transport vessels for Gaza wine, is the Gaza jar, which was produced from the 1st century until at least the early 7th, possibly later.

=== Arab period ===
In exploring the similarities throughout the different eras, Macalister discusses Palestinian pottery found in early Arab villages in ruins around the site of Gezer in the early 20th century, and its shared characteristics with the ancient and modern pottery produced in Palestine. Of the pottery from the Arab period, he notes: "... there seem to have been large globular jars, not unlike the Pre-Semitic and First Semitic barrel-shaped jars." He describes them as having "ledge-handles, though of a different shape from the early ledge-handles", and continues to write that, "... this kind of handle is still made in native pottery." Further, he notes that jar-covers from this period are strikingly similar to those of the "earliest type of ware", the "Second Semitic jar-covers, with two loops in the middle of the saucer".

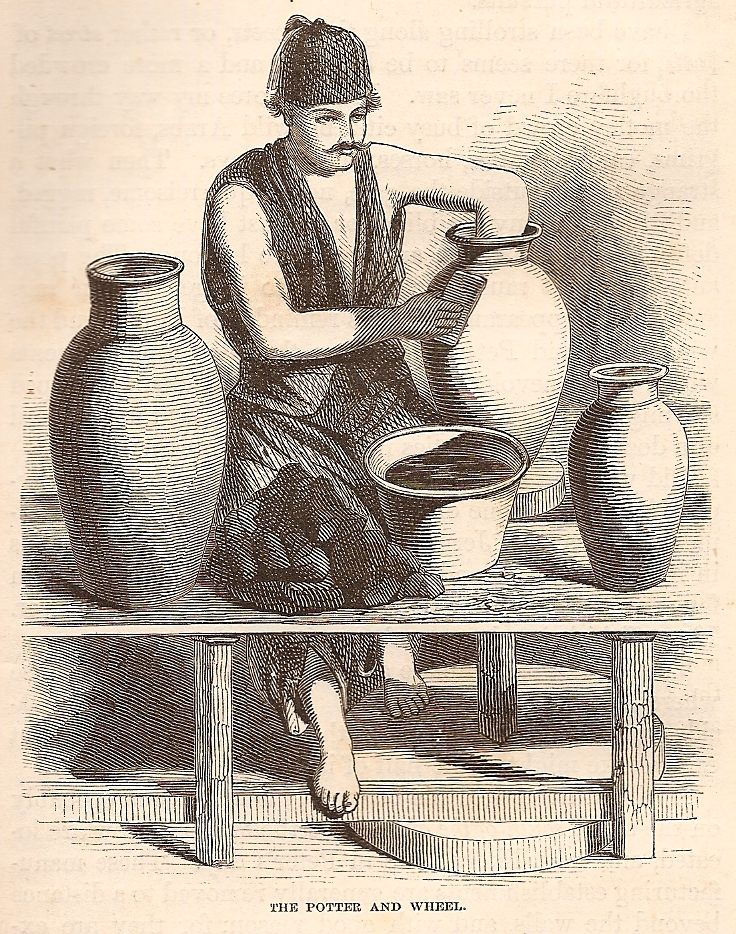
The Potter and Wheel, Jaffa, in 1859. From Thomson, p. 282.

The oil lamps produced during the Arab period are "either of the Hellenistic type, with long spout, or the Byzantine slipper form". The "Third Semitic lamp" which almost completely disappears during the Hellenistic period, comes into use once again during the Arab period and Macalister notes that it is still frequently used among the Arab inhabitants of Palestine.

Some of the linear decoration techniques also show a "startling resemblance to the painted ornament of the Second Semitic Period". Macalister notes that the major differences are that "The slip and the paint have a fatter, richer texture in the Arab ware than in the Amorite, and the painted devices are more geometrical, more mechanical, and also more minute and 'finicking' in the later than in the earlier pottery." As for similarities with the Roman period, horizontal ribbing, a key characteristic of Roman era pottery, "is as common in this period as in the Roman, but it seems to differ in outline".

Large water jars known zīrs were produced in this period throughout the Levant and were also used for storing and transporting olive oil and molasses, like the grape variety dibs. The form and construction of these vessels remain largely unchanged for centuries, characterized by a flat base and bulbous body generally produced using coils of clay with a narrower neck that was wheel thrown and attached to that base and an interior often waterproofed using bitumen.

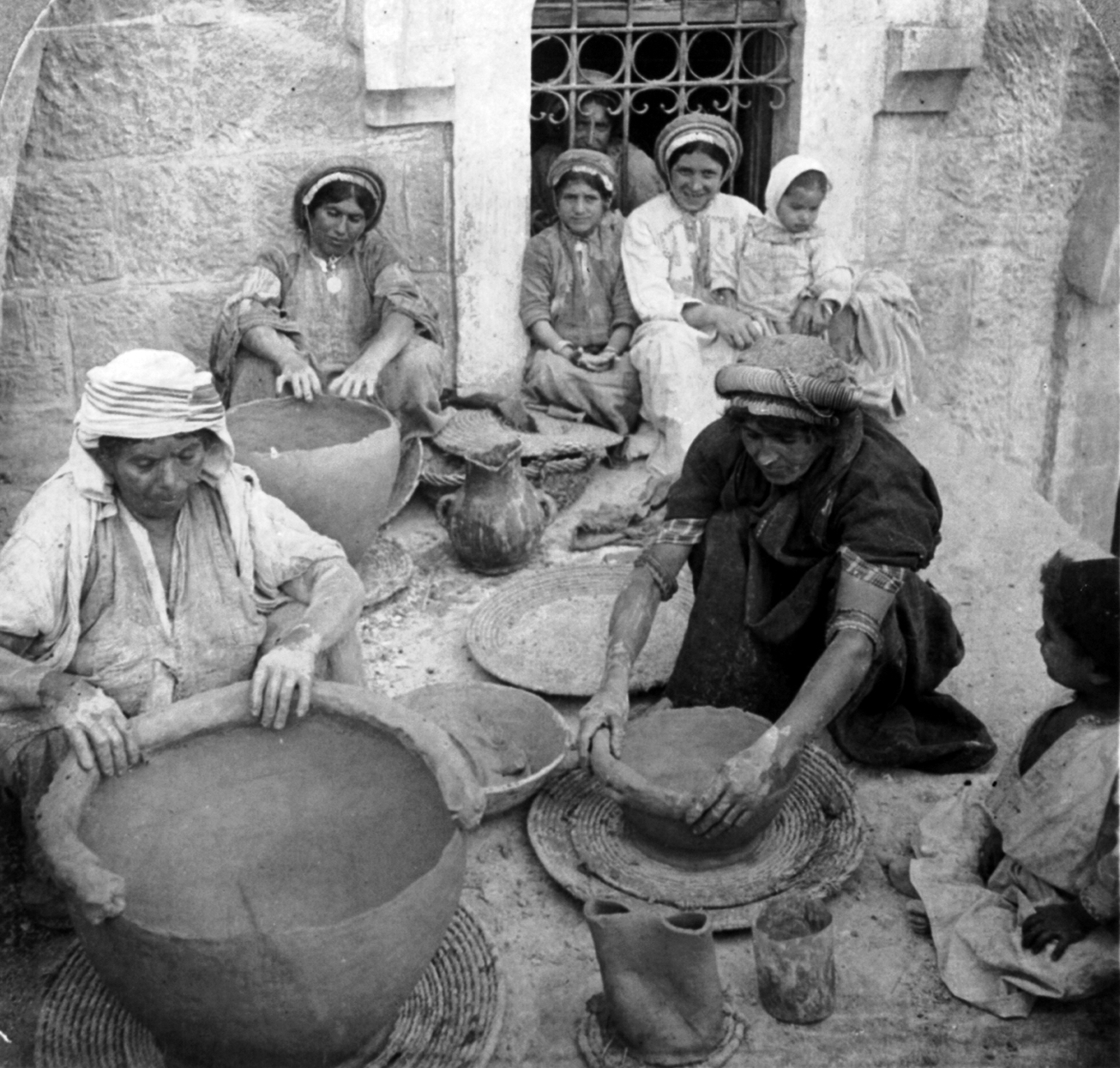
Women making clay vessels in Ramallah c. 1905

Two main Palestinian pottery traditions still practiced today have been definitively traced back to at least the period of Mamluk rule (1250-1517) in Palestine: pottery produced by women and pottery produced by men. Women's pottery was produced by hand, primarily at home and without a wheel, and focused primarily on useful household items, like cooking pots and water vessels. Conversely, men's pottery was more likely to be made in workshops using a wheel, with a more varied output of products.

=== Living craft of pottery by Palestinians ===
The two main pottery traditions, women's and men's, were still being practiced in the 1970s, but the former was beginning to die out, primarily because modern household goods became widely available in the villages where women's pottery had traditionally been produced. Women's pottery production was an annual seasonal affair, taking place between the spring and fall harvests, and serving a female clientele, meeting the domestic need for vessels for cooking, preserving and storing food and water.

Cooking pots were made using calcite temper to be able to withstand high heat, and this was sourced from the village of al-Jib. Water vessels, by contrast, were made using widely available grog and straw. These functional vessels were not devoid of aesthetic finishings, and could be decorated with patterns, for example red geometrical markings reminiscent of the Palestinian embroidery tradition of the Ramallah area. Water vessels used to transport water from wells and cisterns are called jarras and the traditional life of Palestinian women and girls centered around this daily activity.

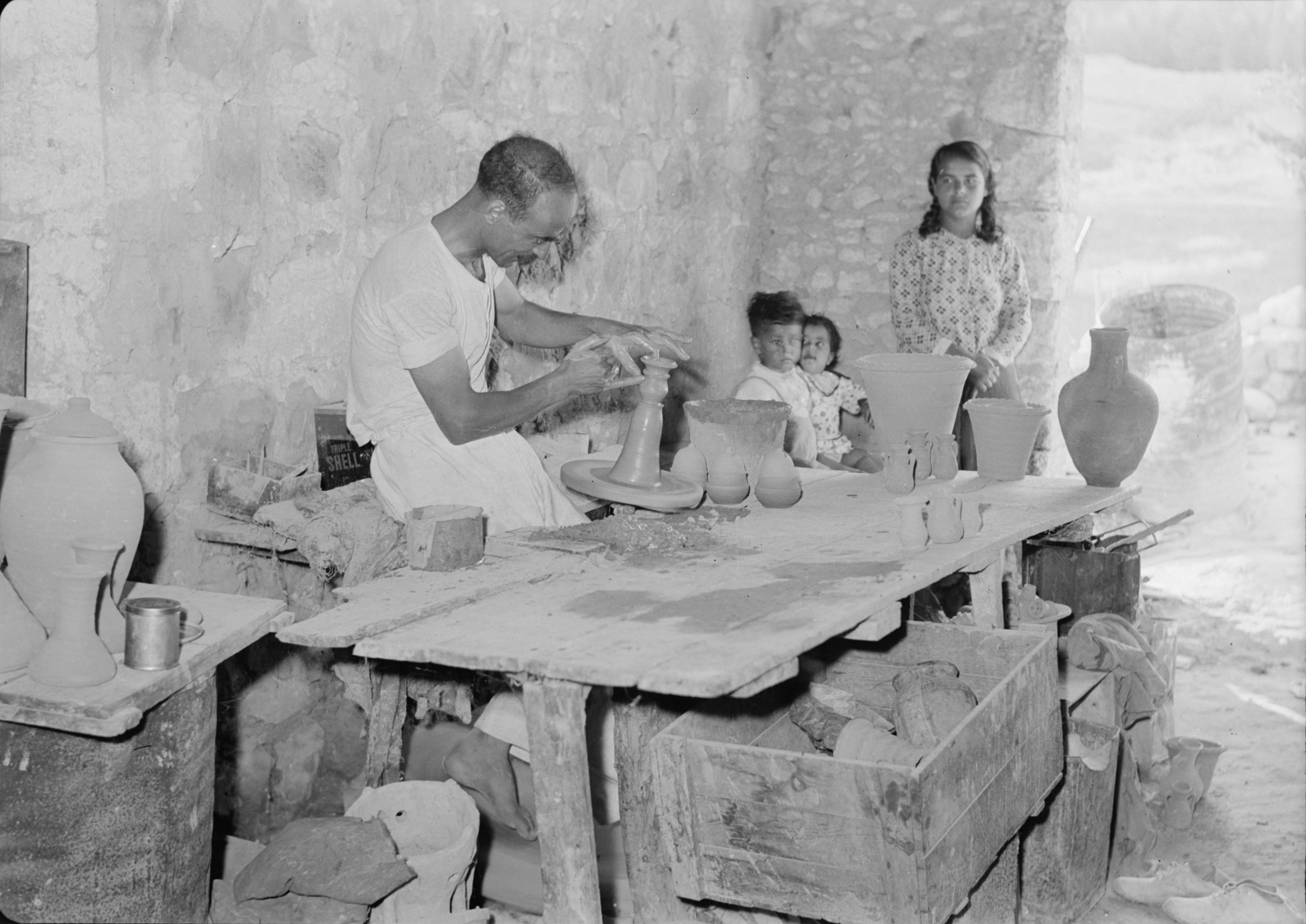
Potter at work at his wheel in Nazareth in 1940

The men's pottery tradition is much more varied and traditionally uses an indigenously made, foot-powered, pottery wheel and a tower-like tabun oven. Pot building on the wheel for more complex pieces involves using a technique specific to Palestine called Tajlis, throwing the inverted pot onto the wheel to work the base, and allowing that to dry before setting it right side up to continue forming the top.

According to an in-depth ethnographic study of Palestinian pottery production in the 1970s, the craft, particularly the men's traditional craft, was still practiced throughout most of the historic Palestine. Two major cities of production with the most workshops were Hebron in the West Bank and Gaza city in the Gaza Strip. Other sites in the West Bank also mentioned in the study include Ramallah, 'Irtah and Jaba', but also the cities of Nazareth, Haifa and Akka where Palestinians who survived the Nakba and became Israeli citizens continued to practice the traditional Palestinian pottery craft.

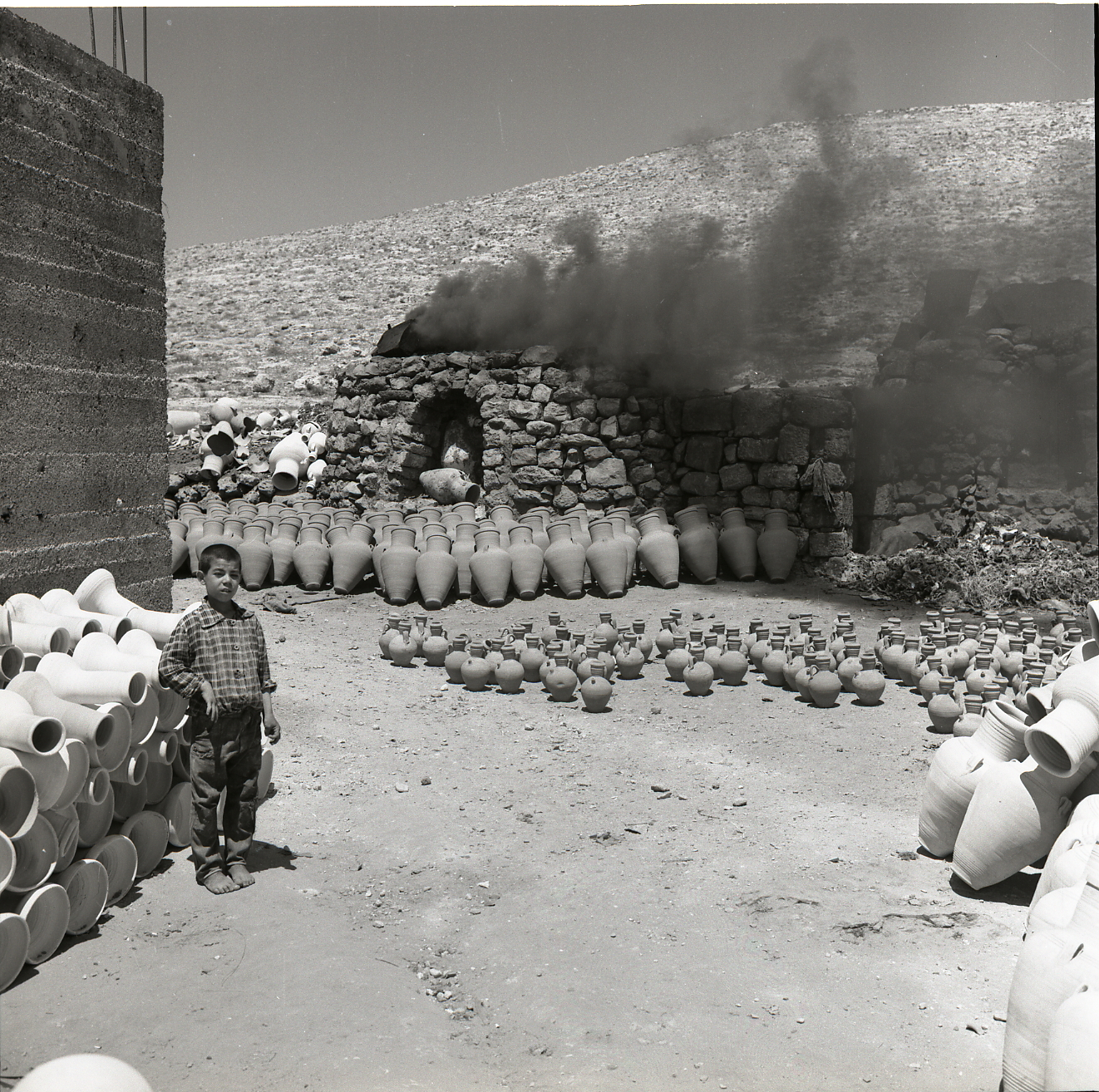
Firing Palestinian pottery in Hebron in 1968

The Palestinian Association for Cultural Exchange (PACE) has put together a collection of traditional pottery, including cooking pots, jugs, mugs and plates that are manufactured by men and women from historic villages like al-Jib (Gibeon), Beitin (Bethel) and Senjel. They are hand-made and fired in open, charcoal-fueled kilns as in ancient times.

Palestinian ceramics are produced at traditional family-owned factories in Hebron and other cities. Covering a wide range of colorful hand painted plates, vases, hanging ornaments, tiles, cups, jars and framed mirrors, the ceramics are known for the intricate detail of their flower and arabesque patterns.

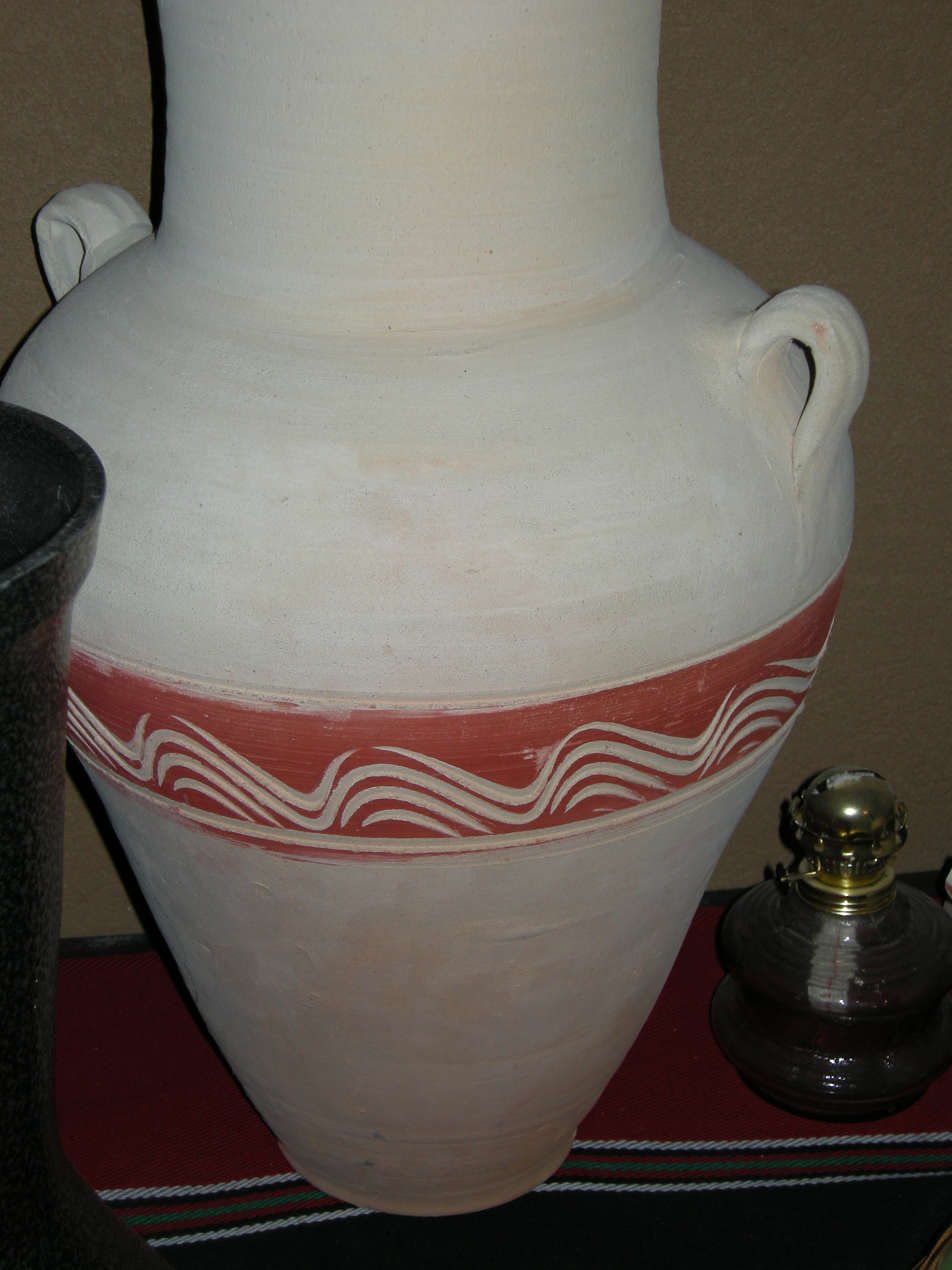
Pottery still being produced in the Palestinian Bedouin village of Drijat in the Naqab

Palestinian artists who produce contemporary clay sculpture, like Vera Tamari from Ramallah, have incorporated the clay shards from ancient pieces into their work. Says Tamari,

"My own artwork is inspired by seeing the history in Palestinian land. For a time, I used a lot of shards of pottery as a theme in my clay work. You find shards of pottery everywhere because Palestine has had so many thousand of years of history that you walk on a hill and you just find these little pieces of pottery that are evidence of life that was there — pieces of jars, of plates, of bowls."

Dina Ghazal from Nablus uses another approach, believing that abstraction will best express the essence of her ideas. The qualities of the material she works with are very important for Ghazal, she explains that her work is an attempt to show the versatility of the medium and she hopes to challenge traditional perceptions of the use of the clay.

== See also ==
- Palestinian archaeology

== Bibliography ==
- Milwright, Marcus (2008). "Unglazed ceramics". The Fortress of the Raven. pp. 135–183.
- Naguib, Nefissa (2008). "Women and places outside". Women, Water and Memory. pp. 125–137.
- Landgraf, John; Rye, Owen S. Palestinian Traditional Pottery: A contribution to Palestinian Culture. ISBN 9789042947085.
- Macalister, R. A. Stewart (1912). The Excavation of Gezer: 1902 - 1905 and 1907 - 1909 (PDF). John Murray, Albemarle Street West, London.
- Needler, Winifred (1949). Palestine: Ancient and Modern. Royal Ontario Museum of Archaeology. pp. 75–76.
- Neusner, Jacob; Chilton, Bruce; Green, William Scott (2008). Historical knowledge in biblical antiquity (Illustrated ed.). Deo Pub. ISBN 9781905679003.
- Wickham, Chris (2007). Framing the Early Middle Ages: Europe and the Mediterranean, 400–800 (Illustrated, reprint ed.). Oxford University Press. ISBN 9780199212965.
- Vriezen, Karel (2024). "BOOK REVIEW: Palestine Traditional Pottery: Craft and Commerce". Jerusalem Quarterly (97). doi:10.70190/jq.I97.p108.
