= Levantine pottery =

Ceramics from the Levant

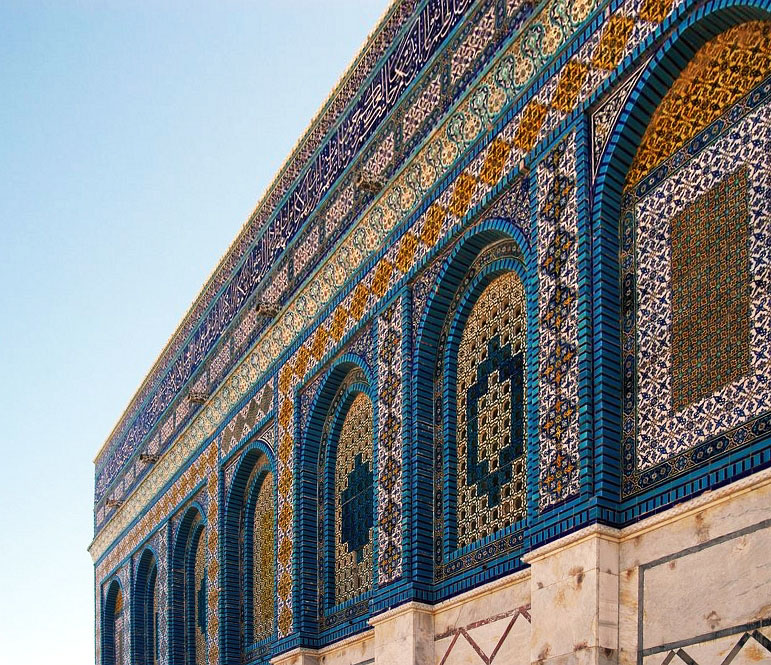
Tiles on the Dome of the Rock, in Jerusalem

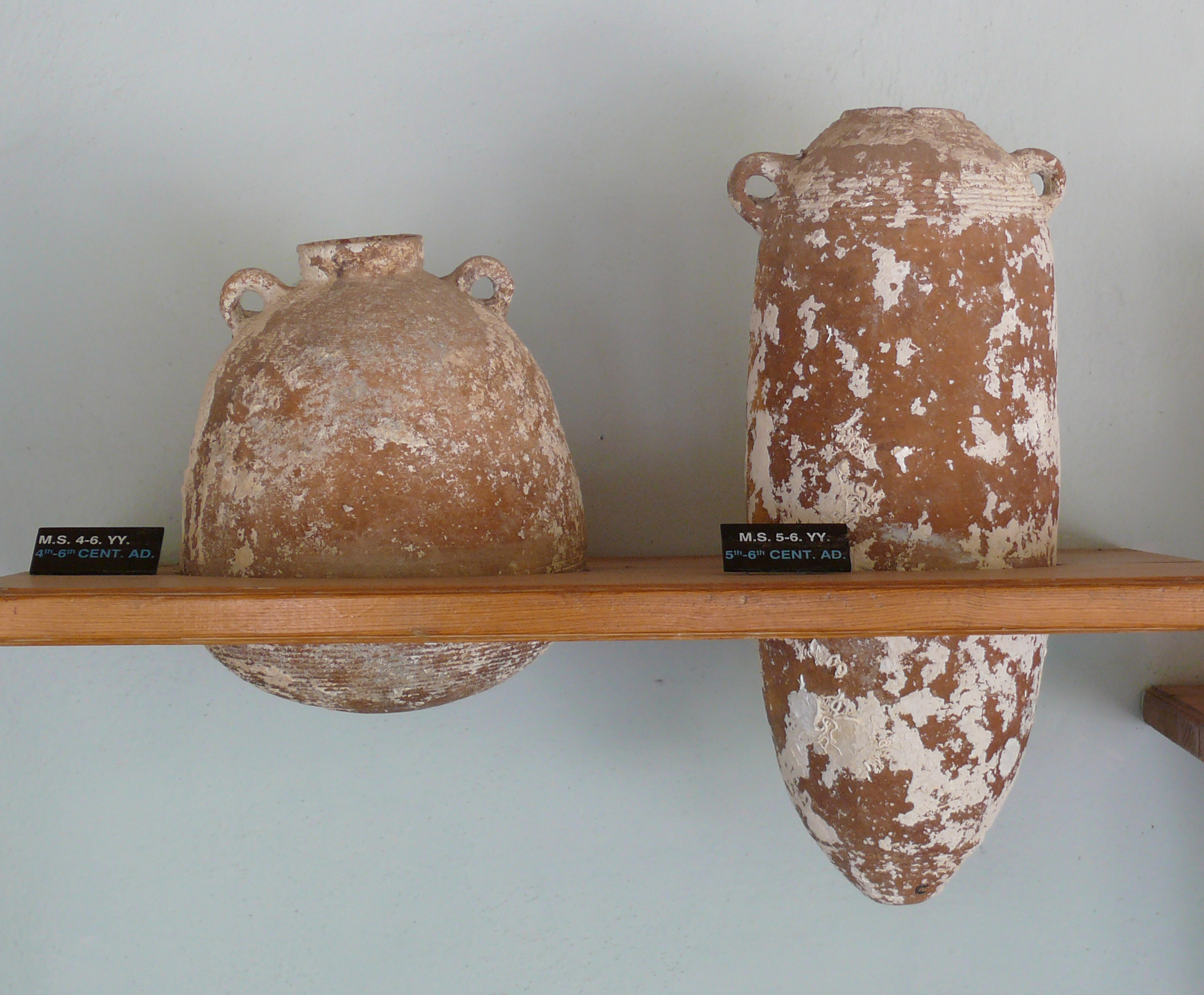
Palestinian amphorae in Bodrum Castle, Turkey

Levantine pottery draws inspiration from the Ceramic traditions of the Levant. It spans from the Neolithic period to the present. The earliest developments involved lime plaster vessels, simple Neolithic wares, and decorated forms such as the Yarmukian Pottery. The Chalcolithic and Bronze Age are denoted by the introduction of the Potter's wheel, regional variations, and extrinsic influences from Cyprus, Syria, and the Aegean. It produced distinctive wares, such as Khirbet Kerak and Chocolate-on-white.

With the emergence of the Iron Age, the pottery work reflected cultural identities, with Philistine, Samaria, Israelite, and Judea traditions, which developed unique styles. In the Classical, Byzantine, and Arab periods, local production persisted alongside imported slipware and new decorative techniques. Many of these traditions still continue to persist in the modern-age Palestinian pottery, which holds forms, clay, and designs that are rooted deeply in ancient practices.

== Historic background ==
=== Neolithic period ===
The history of pottery in the region begins in the Late Neolithic period, sometimes known as Pottery Neolithic (PN) or occasionally, based on a supposed local sequence of the site of Jericho, Pottery Neolithic A.

==== Pre-Pottery Neolithic (c. 8300 – c. 5500 BC) ====
There is no good evidence for pottery production in Early Neolithic (Pre-pottery Neolithic/PP) times, but the existence of pyrotechnology that allowed humans to attain temperatures in excess of 1,000 °C (1,830 °F) for reducing limestone to lime to make plaster, indicates a level of technology ripe for the discovery of pottery and its spread. In the PPN period portable vessels of lime plaster, called "vaisselles blanche" or "White Ware" served some of the functions that pottery later fulfilled. These vessels tended to be rather large and coarse and were somewhat rare.

There are some indications that pottery may have been in use in the third and final phase of the Early Neolithic, PPNC (recognized Early Neolithic phases are, beginning with the earliest, PPNA, PPNB, and PPNC); however, such artifacts are rare, their provenance is equivocal and the issue remains in doubt. Approximately sometime in the late 6th millennium BC, pottery was introduced into the southern Levant, and it became widely used. The supposedly sophisticated forms and technological and decorative aspects suggested to archaeologists that it must have been received as an imported, technological advance from adjacent regions to the north and was not developed locally. The evidence for this hypothesis, however, remains equivocal due to the lack of documentation in the archaeological record. This hypothesis also does not take into account the bulk of simple, rudely fashioned vessels that were part of the ceramic repertoire of this period.

==== Pottery Neolithic (c. 5500 – c. 4500 BC) ====
Because of discoveries of earlier pottery traditions made starting in the 1990s, the time frame for the initial Late Neolithic ceramic period is thought to be roughly 7000–6700 BC. These earliest pottery traditions may be known in literature as 'Initial Pottery Neolithic' in the Balikh River area of Syria and Turkey, for example Tell Sabi Abyad. Or it may be known as 'Halula I' in the Syrian Euphrates area; the main site is Tell Halula. Also, it may be known as 'Rouj 2a' in Northern Levantine Rouj basin (Idlib, Syria).

By the earliest PN phase pottery was ubiquitous and it remained so for virtually all periods in the southern Levant until modern times. Exceptions were in desert areas where semi-nomads favored less heavy, fragile and bulky arrangements. Pottery styles, based mostly on form, fabric and decorative elements have been used to help identify chrono-cultural phases. White ware remained in use, but it seems to have remained rare and the vessels were often small and rather delicate. It is possible that not a few such vessels were found and identified as pottery.

The earliest PN phase is associated with the site of Sha'ar HaGolan in the Jordan Valley. This pottery is sometimes called "Yarmukian Ware". The diagnostic pottery typical of this period is somewhat sophisticated. Its most outstanding aspect is the use of long, narrow, incised bands of lines filled with herringbone decoration, often painted red or yellow. Forms of vessels may be quite delicate and lug handles on small jars with long necks are not uncommon. More common, coarser and less well made vessels are also present but are less diagnostic for the period.

Common or cruder wares generally have simple shapes and are often less well finished and are not decorated. Vessel walls of this class are often of uneven thickness and look 'lumpy'. This crude aspect is often further emphasized by grass-wiped exteriors and the negative impressions left by straw or vegetal tempers (i.e. chopped up dried grass or weeds) which combust and leave hollows after firing. These inclusion were either added intentionally, or are the unintentional result of poorly levigated (i.e. a process of purifying clay by removal of natural, non-clay inclusions such as stones and plant materials) or unlevigated clay, and are characteristic of this coarse Neolithic pottery. Later Neolithic pottery tends to favor the use of different tempers, sand, gravel, small stones and sometimes grog (ground up pottery). Much Neolithic pottery is low-fired and did not attain temperatures far above 600 °C (1,112 °F), which is more or less the minimum required for creating pottery from low-fired clays. Probably these vessels were pit-fired rather than fired in kilns, although such an hypothesis remains to be proven. To date there is no direct evidence in excavation based literature on how Neolithic peoples of the southern Levant fired their pottery.

Later Neolithic pottery has less distinctive features. Work at Jericho by K. Kenyon suggested to her two periods of Late Neolithic, based on the existence of coarser and finer pottery groups. The former, supposedly representing a less sophisticated and earlier occupation, was labeled PNA (Pottery Neolithic A); the latter was called PNB (Pottery Neolithic B). Many researchers now believe the difference to be one of function rather than evidence for chronological differences between these two groups, since examples of each are often found in contemporary contexts. Thus, PNB types are often designated as fine or luxury wares.

The site of Munhatta, excavated by J. Perrot, has contributed a large series of ceramic assemblages dated to the Neolithic period. In one phase there are some extraordinarily sophisticated ceramic vessels of especially finely levigated, highly polished or burnished (polishing of almost dry, leather hard, surfaces of unfired clay to produce a smooth surface that becomes shiny when fired), black fabric. Other pottery suggests that some potters in this period, dated later than an earlier, "Yarmukian" phase at the site (identified by Sha'ar HaGolan type pottery), were highly skilled craftspeople. One researcher, Y. Garfinkel, refers to this phase as "Jericho IX" after a stratum and associated pottery excavated by J. Garstang at Jericho (he excavated at Jericho prior to Kenyon). The decorated pottery of this period often has red paint in the form of stripes, sometimes in large, wide herringbone-like decorations.

Not all pottery from these phases is so chrono-culturally diagnostic. Most vessels are of plain wares and utilitarian types. In addition, other methods of decoration are known in the later Neolithic. They include the use of slips (color applied to an entire vessel), burnishing and incising (e.g. notching, combing, slashing, etc.). Wavy lines of combing, often combined with painting are one of the distinctive types of Late Neolithic decoration associated with the Rabah phase (see below). The use of red slips and paints is common in this and later periods, and is probably the direct outcome of clays used, which are rich in iron oxides that tend, under some conditions, to fire to earthy red tones ranging from brown to orange and brick-red. These same clays, when fired in a reducing atmosphere (i.e. devoid of oxygen) often become gray or black in color. Dark colored, gray to black cores on some pots indicate incomplete firing

The most recent PN phase is named after the site of Wadi Rabah, excavated by J. Kaplan. Y. Garfinkel relegates this final LN period to Early Chalcolithic. The distinction seems to be mostly a matter of terminology. Since there is no definitive break between Late Neolithic and Early Chalcolithic, each researcher must decide what is Neolithic and what is Early Chalcolithic. The situation is even more complicated because there appears to be considerable regional variation in Neolithic pottery assemblages and not a little confusion as to what constitutes chrono-culturally related assemblages. That is a function of the generally poor preservation of PN sites and the way in which they were excavated.

Summary: Neolithic pottery may well have arrived as a full-blown technological set from more northerly regions. Pottery appears to have become ubiquitous in the southern Levant by late in the 6th millennium and remained as an integral part of human material culture up to the present. Some local potters showed particular skill in their production, which suggests, as is the case with flint knappers, real craft specialization. That is related to skills in finding and preparing raw materials, fashioning pots, decorating them, and controlling the pyrotechnology needed to turn them into pottery. Some aspects of pottery, form, fabric, modes of decoration are relatively reliable diagnostic indicators of chrono-cultural identities of human society. Pottery, mostly in the form of sherds, often makes up the bulk of material culture artifacts found on excavated sites dating from the PN period.

== Chalcolithic period (Early 4th millennium BC – c. 3500 BC) ==
The Chalcolithic (or "Copper-Stone Age") is a chrono-cultural period that may have lasted for over a millennium, although the date of its end is somewhat problematic. The earliest phases of this period are associated with pottery that is little different from the pottery of the Latest Neolithic periods (see Late Neolithic Pottery). While plain wares probably dominate most assemblages, it is the decorated types which have been paid most attention to by scholars. There are few well excavated sites and no good stratigraphic sequences that have produced enough well-stratified pottery to allow for the development of any reliable chronological sequence in pottery styles, although some are claimed. Pottery of the Chalcolithic period can, for the present, be divided into two major chronological groups, Early and Late Chalcolithic. The more distinctive is the later group, known from some extensively excavated sites which have yielded large ceramic repertoires. There appear to be regional differences, especially between the northern and southern spheres of the southern Levant and at sites to the east. Some of these differences may also be chronological; new 14C (radiocarbon) dates suggest one type site, Teleilat el Ghassul in the northern Aravah Valley in Jordan, is somewhat earlier in date than a group of sites in the Beersheva Basin. Garfinkel's attempt to divide this period into three phases, Early, Middle and Late, is based on a number of spurious assemblages and is lacking in authority. While such chronological distinctions may be possible, not enough is presently known of the sequence of the Chalcolithic for determining it.

Pottery of the Early Chalcolithic period is often similar to that of the Late Neolithic. One diagnostic feature of this period is found in pottery made on mats, probably of straw. When this was the case, the clay was pressed into the weave of the mat, leaving an impression which potters sometimes did not remove. Thus some bases of vessels in this period bear distinct patterns of mats on which they were made. Other techniques used for pottery production in this period include painting and slipping of exteriors, and the limited use of incised decoration, sometimes in a fish bone pattern but of usually much larger dimensions than that associated with Yarmukian pottery. One specialized form associated with this period is the so-called 'torpedo' vessel, a long narrow, thick-walled jar with two large, vertical lugs attached to its upper, almost tube-like body. Pottery of the Late Chalcolithic period sees a continuation of many of the basic shapes and types of the earlier period, but much of the typical decoration of the earlier Chalcolithic is discontinued.

Late Chalcolithic pottery is known for some special shapes including: 1) cornets—cone-like vessels with narrow apertures and long, highly tapered sides ending in exaggerated, long stick-like bases; 2) (so-called)churns or bird vessels, barrel-shaped vessels, often with bow shaped neck, one flat end and two lugs at either horizontal end of barrel, intended for suspension; 3) small bowls with straight sides tapering to flat bases (so-called V-shaped despite the flat bases; fenestrated-pedestaled bowls, small vases with vertical lugs pierced circularly, vertical tube handles, large holemouths with broad shoulders and relatively narrow bases.

Small bowls and cornets of this period can be especially thin and appear to have been turned on wheels, but they are only finished that way. Recent research on the techniques of bowl making in this period indicate these vessels, while turned on a wheel, were actually only finished that way by scraping, after having been fashioned by hand. There is no evidence to show that the fast potter's wheel was used in the Chalcolithic period for 'throwing pots' using centripetal force. The wavy line or indented ledge handle makes its appearance in the central littoral in this period, presaging its adoption as the most common type of handle throughout the Early Bronze Age. Common decorations include raised, rope-like bands on some vessels, red painting and pie-crust like decoration on rims of large vessels (excepting holemouths. Combing, that produced wide, broad, flat lines, is sometimes found on jars of the Late Chalcolithic. Pronounced regional variations as well as functions of sites determine the kinds of vessels, types of clay used, and the forms of decoration preferred. Chalcolithic pottery technology and morphology greatly influenced the ceramic styles of the succeeding Early Bronze I period, especially in the southern region.

Specialized production of ossuaries (boxes intended to hold bones after decarnation; i.e., secondary burials) is well documented in this period. It includes many types of rectangular boxes, some with extremely elaborate facades. Some anthropomorphic visages appear on these ossuaries in three-dimensional sculpting (rare), often with the nose particularly prominently, while other features are generally painted. Some ossuaries are fashioned of typical jars, altered and adorned for this specific mortuary-related function.

== Early Bronze Age (c. 3500 – c. 2000 BC) ==
Abandonment of many sites at the end of the Chalcolithic period and major changes in material culture led archaeologists to name the post Chalcolithic period the "Early Bronze Age", a misnomer (only copper without tin {copper + tin = bronze} was in use) that has become an accepted convention. Pottery continued to be made in quantity and, until quite recently there was thought to have been a thoroughgoing break in traditions from earlier periods, in typology and morphology. While major differences are known and became greater as the Early Bronze Age progressed, the earliest phases show more than a modicum of continuity with Chalcolithic potting traditions. The Early Bronze Age may now be divided up into three sequential phases, Early Bronze I, Early Bronze II and Early Bronze III. Some scholars include an Early Bronze IV in the Early Bronze Age. That period is known to other scholars as Middle Bronze I, Early Bronze-Middle Bronze and Intermediate Bronze. On the basis of pottery styles there is some justification for using the term Early Bronze IV.

Early Bronze I (c. 3500 – c. 3000 BC) pottery in the southern region is obviously derived from Chalcolithic traditions. Similar types of vessels are known and they were, in the earliest phases, made according to traditional Chalcolithic methods of manufacture. In the north there seems to be much less continuity, but that may be more of perception of the archaeological record. Unfortunately there is no good Chalcolithic sequence in the north from which one may learn precisely what the latest Chalcolithic facies is.

=== Regionalism ===
What is clear is that in the earliest phases of EB I there is a pronounced regionalism that becomes less visible over time. Regionalism is particularly marked in the earliest phase of Early Bronze I, with a dichotomy between northern and southern spheres of influence and a mosaic of more localized traditions within those larger spheres. In the southern region pie-crust type decoration is commonly found on large storage jars, while for the first time this type of detail is also found on holemouth vessels. The ledge handle becomes prominent in this period; its earliest exponents, obviously inherited from the preceding period, is notable for almost invariably having a wavy-line edge in many variations. Only rather late in the period and in specific regions was this appendage made with smooth edges. Poor preservation at most southern sites has limited knowledge of the typology of this early phase.

Pottery from the northern region fully recognized as Early Bronze I, shows less evidence of owing its inspiration to the preceding period. However, this may merely be a function of limited perception by researchers who fail to distinguish the pottery of what may be an initial phase of Early Bronze I.

A slightly later phase is well known from a number of sites, the best known of which is Yiftah'el in the Beit Netofa Valley system. The site has yielded a relatively large corpus of reasonably preserved vessels. The most distinctive pottery of this period is known as "Gray Burnished ware" or sometimes as "Esdraelon ware" or Proto-Urban C pottery. This ware is known for its generally gray color, highly burnished finish, and a limited and distinctive range of morphological types, almost invariably bowls. Most of the bowls have a carinated (angled) profile, some of them with flat projections forming an undulating line in a birds eye view. Similar morphological types are also found in red or in buff colors. Additional ceramic types have features that are reminiscent of Chalcolithic types. In addition the ledge handle is also prominent in this period. Pottery is always handmade and in the earliest phases appears to have been home-made by local potters working within general traditions of how a pot should look, but with little slavish copying. The high loop handle was popular in this period for jugs and juglets.

=== Early Bronze IB (3300-3000 BCE) ===
A second phase of Early Bronze I may be seen in both the northern and southern regions. In the north much pottery is painted or slipped red and burnished. Gray Burnished ware continues to be made but examples of this ware, in the earlier period finely made and obviously luxury items, are less well made.

A related morphological type is a curved bowl with a line of evenly spaced conical protrusions just below the rim on the exterior of the vessel. Such bowls are also known to be red-slipped in the north; in the south similar types are very rare and neither slipped nor burnished. Grain-wash, a kind of painting that leave a pattern that is slightly reminiscent of wood (sometimes called band-slip) makes its appearance in this period in the north. Pithoi are of different types. Two well-known types are distinguished by their rims; one has a pronounced bow-rim, while the other has a thickened rim with regular striations that give it its name, 'rail rim'.

In the south there remains a deal of regionality, stressed by two types of decorated wares which only slightly overlap in their distribution. They are 'line painted group', red lines usually on a light background. Within that group is a very distinctive 'basket style', that imitates basketry. This type was commonly found in the Hill Country around Jerusalem and down to Jericho and Bab edh-Dhra in the Jordan Rift Valley.

Further south, in the Shephela (piedmont) down to the Northern Negev is found a group of pottery with distinctive striated handles, often double stranded, and sometimes with thin coils of clay wrapped horizontally around where the handles were attached to the vessel walls. Other generic types were made, including more standardized pithoi, often with a thick, with quick-lime type coating on their exteriors. These pithoi were commonly decorated with flat, thin strips of clay placed horizontally around the vessel in 1 or more bands and pressed flat at regular intervals so as to give the impression of a rope.

=== Increase of standardization ===
It is in this period that there is a great increase of standardization within the larger spheres, northern and southern. While no center of pottery production has yet been found, there seems to be evidence for extensive trading of pottery between sites or possibly from a central point of production. Only extensive petrographic analyses can help to prove this and perhaps pinpoint some possible location for such centers.

By the third and final phase of Early Bronze I there remains a dichotomy between north and south, with red-burnishing as opposed to no burnishing and the extensive use of white, quick-lime slip reflecting northern and southern traditions, respectively. Extensive trade of ceramics, or possibly groups of itinerant potters seem to have left much evidence for their movement or that of pots between regions and within regions. Morphological types are shared from region to region and sphere to sphere, but often with localized details.

All pottery from this period is handmade. Egyptian imported pottery if found in some sites in the south western region in this period. Most sites have only a small quantity, but a few select sites suggest prolonged contacts with Egyptians and possibly even Egyptians residing in the southern Levant.

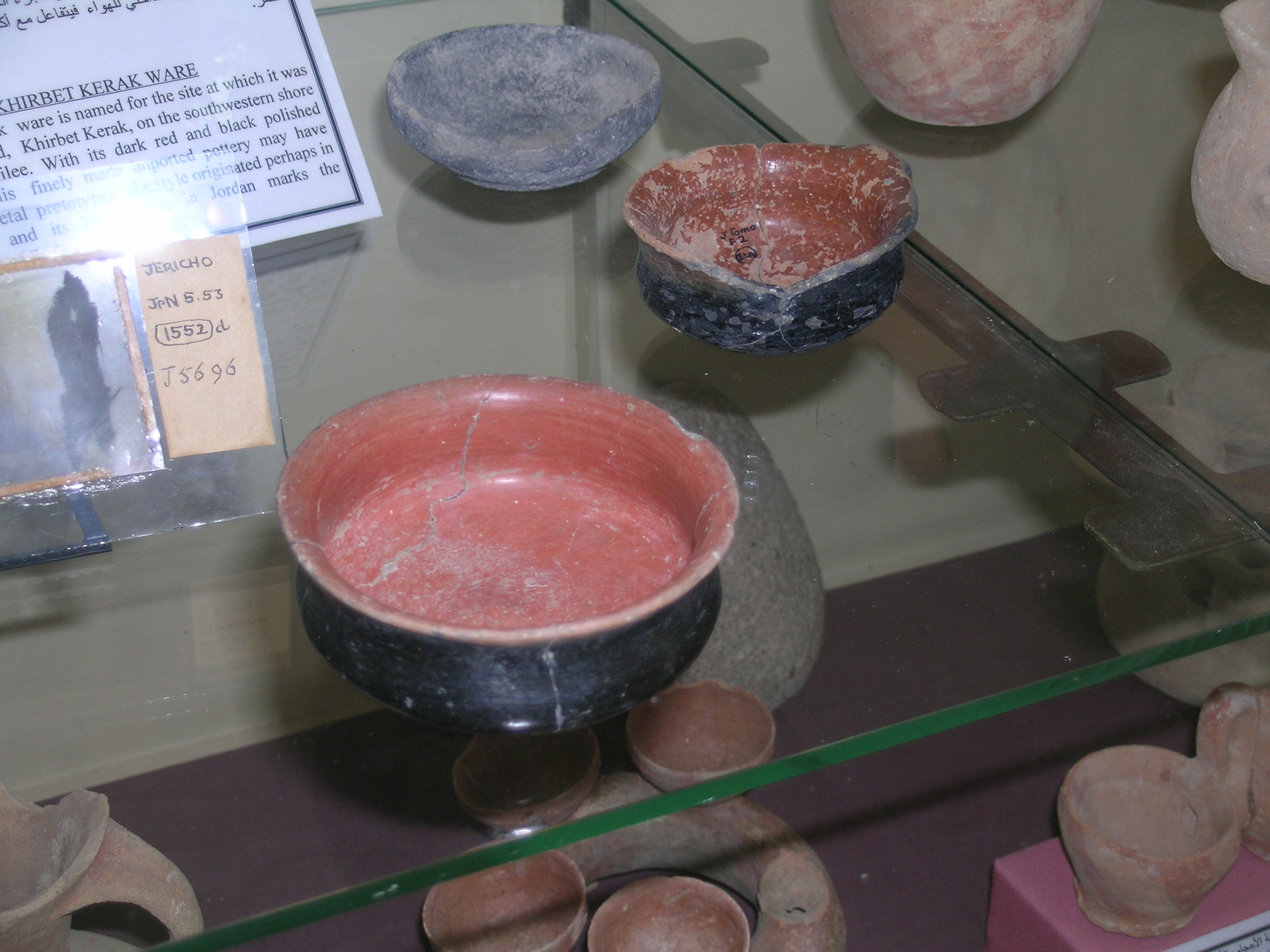
Khirbet Kerak ware, in a museum in Tel Aviv

Pottery of Early Bronze I in the north seems to presage that of Early Bronze II in terms of morphology and decoration (especially red painting and burnishing), although in the later period potters achieved similar types through very different technological approaches.

=== Potter's wheel ===
Wheels seem to have come into use and new fabrics, better levigated (cleared of coarse materials) were made. So-called 'metallic ware' was introduced in this period. Some examples look as if they were imitating metal, while the high-fired fabrics give off a metallic-like ring when struck. Jugs, platters of this ware were found alongside others of more plain fabrics.

'Metallic ware' was probably made somewhere in Lebanon or in the region of Mount Hermon and disseminated to the south, generally as far as the Jezreel Valley. Further south similar morphological types are known, but they are of different wares.

=== Early Bronze III (2750-2350 BCE) ===
==== Khirbet Kerak ware ====
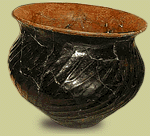
Khirbet Kerak ware

Early Bronze III types continue the earlier tradition, but in the north a new ware type, transported from the Caucasus and probably brought overland via Anatolia and Syria, makes its appearance.

First discovered at Khirbet Kerak (Tel Bet Yerah) on the Kinneret during the 1920s, it is known as Khirbet Kerak ware, and it is associated with the Kura–Araxes culture that developed in the Caucasus area. It was obviously made by potters who brought the tradition with them. Examples are of highly distinctive types, jugse and jars, sometimes with fluting, painted and highly burnished red or black or a combination of these colors, andirons, some with decorations and faces, and carinated bowls.

Khirbet Kerak ware was always handmade. It is also known as Red Black Burnished ware (sometimes hyphenated "Red-Black") in west Syrian and Amuq Valley contexts. In Transcaucasia—from which area it seems ultimately to have originated—the ware is also referred to as Karaz or Pulur ware. As such, it may be associated with the later historic appearance of the people recognised historically as the Hurrians. Petrographic analyses shows some of it was made locally. Other local traditions continue and eventually influenced the pottery of the Intermediate Age, which followed.

The potter's wheel, used primarily for throwing small bowls using centrifugal force is known from this period. It represents an innovation that was continued in the following period, when it was employed to fashion rims for vessels of certain types. The piriform juglet makes its appearance in this period, but whether it has any connection with the later, Middle Bronze II vessels of analogous form, is unclear. With the exception of Khirbet Kerak ware, the pottery of this period continues the Early Bronze traditions and passed them on to the people who populated the small communities of the succeeding period.

=== Early Bronze IV (c. 2350 – c. 2000 BC) ===
This period goes under a number of names: Early Bronze/Middle Bronze, Early Bronze IV and Intermediate Bronze are just some of the appellations given it. The pottery of the earliest phases has a clear 'Early Bronze flavor'. Some of the shapes of vessels and the details of them, e.g. flat bases and folded 'envelope-like' ledge handles indicate continuity of traditions. Indeed, recent evidence of Early Bronze III sites shows that certain forms made their appearance then and continued into Early Bronze IV or even later. The four-spouted lamp is one of these; another is the 'teapot' shape.

There is a major dichotomy and great differences between the pottery of the northern and southern regions. Certain shapes are associated with particular fabric types which, can be related to one or the other region. The pottery of this period shows some innovations, including the use of the wheel for fashioning the rims of jars. In the south decoration was generally incisions, while painting was more common in the north. There are also regional variations with pottery from Transjordan somewhat different from that associated with areas west of the Jordan.

Unfortunately relatively few settlements have been dug from this period and most of the pottery known is derived from tombs. That is because most of the major population centers were deserted at the end of Early Bronze III and people tended to settle in much smaller communities. Probably because they had less resources and perhaps had to work harder to keep themselves, they left relatively scanty evidence of their permanent settlements. Once it was believed that most of the people of this period were semi-nomadic, but as time goes by more and more evidence of sedentism in this period is being found. In the north is found the first evidence of infiltration of Syrian type pottery in a group of so-called 'Megiddo teapots', small, delicate, wheel-made vessels of high-fired, dark, almost metallic fabric decorated with white, wavy lines.

Sites have yielded evidence of local variations in decoration, morphology and fabrics. One such is the use of burnished red slips known from the cemetery at Bab edh-Dhra. In the Beth Shan region certain vessels have special painted decoration, while a cave near Tel Qedesh in Upper Galilee yielded many pedestaled lamps. Basically, the pottery of this period represents the last dying gasps of a tradition that reaches back into the local Chalcolithic (with even earlier antecedents) period and continuing on into the Early Bronze Age. There are, however, hints at the major changes to come in influences from the area to the north, Syria, which was to revolutionize ceramic traditions in the southern Levant for the next two millennia.

== Middle Bronze Age (c. 2000 – c. 1550 BC) ==
Pottery of this period owes relatively little to local antecedents. It has its roots in more northerly regions, especially in the traditions of Syria, which in turn was in contact with Mesopotamian and Anatolian regions. The pottery of the full-blown Middle Bronze Age (Middle Bronze IIA, IIB and IIC) represents a revolutionary tradition for the southern Levant.

This period is divided into three subperiods: MBII A, B, and C. B and C are more closely linked than A. This period is diagnosed by the well-burnished red slip so often seen in the corresponding layers at digs. The slip is normally used on the smaller vessels of the period. Other decorating techniques found to be frequent amongst this period's pottery are horizontal sometimes triangular designs in black or red paint.

The second half of this period (B+C) is not seen by the burnished red slip, which all but disappeared during the eighteenth century, replaced by white/creamy slip. The pottery is often quite thinly walled and even kilned at high temperatures. Despite this, there is a progression of techniques from MBII A, which does denote continuity in society from then. Other noticeable traits of the period are a lack of painted design on most types of pottery and then only unicolored. The one color often tends to be stripes or circles with the odd bird making an appearance. These designs appear on ointment juglets.

The ointment juglet is the most important piece of pottery of the period. The fashion of juglets swings gradually from piriform ones to cylindrical. Amongst these vessels we find zoomorphic shapes like animals or human heads. These designs are often accompanied by "puncturing", which used to be filled by white lime.

Lastly Chocolate-on-White ware and Cypriot Bichrome ware are important pottery types appearing in the 16th century. The first of the two types consists of a thick white slip being applied followed by a dark brown paint. This type is found in the northern region of the country particularly close to the Jordan Valley. The Bichrome ware, the more important of the two, can be found at Tell el-Ajjul and Tel Megiddo among others. Its "pendant" lines or stripes that come usually as black on white slip, or more commonly as red on black can help notice this type of pottery. Bichrome was imported from Cyprus.

== Late Bronze Age (1550–1150 BC) ==
Due to the influx of imported types of pottery, the pottery of this period must be divided into four sub groups:

=== Local pottery ===
Though the beginning of its production dates back even earlier to the Early Bronze Age, it is in this period that Negevite pottery, consisting primarily of cooking pots, begins to be seen in large concentrations beyond the Negev highlands. It is found alongside Qurayya ware in the copper mining sites around Timna, indicating that the nomadic pastoralists who produced it were probably working in the mines at least some of the time. Similarities between Qurayya ware which was produced in Qurayyat, Saudi Arabia and the Negevite cooking pots speaks to a shared southern Levantine-North Arabian material culture.

The local shows that there is a clear evolution of the pottery through the MB to this period. The difference that can be remarked between the two periods is that the juglets that were once of great dispersion go down in popularity and become gray as the Late Bronze Age begins. In fact the local pottery is now mass-produced in a rough and cheap manner.

Paint decoration returns to fashion, even though it is simply added to the light buff slip, and sometimes without slip. The paint shows many different geometric shapes, and sometimes inside painted on rectangular panels called metopes a sacred tree flanked by two antelopes can be found.

=== The Bichrome Group ===
Again in this period we can see that the majority of this group is red paint on black background. The most common vessels that we find this type in are kraters, jars and jugs. This group, after being tested with neutron activation techniques, shows that it was imported from eastern Cyprus; this includes Cypriot Bichrome ware. The major controversy is whether the Cypriot market produced Canaanite styles for exporting purposes, or whether Canaanites were producing the pottery for the home consumption in Israel. This pottery was also to be found in Megiddo locally made.

=== Cypriot imported pottery ===
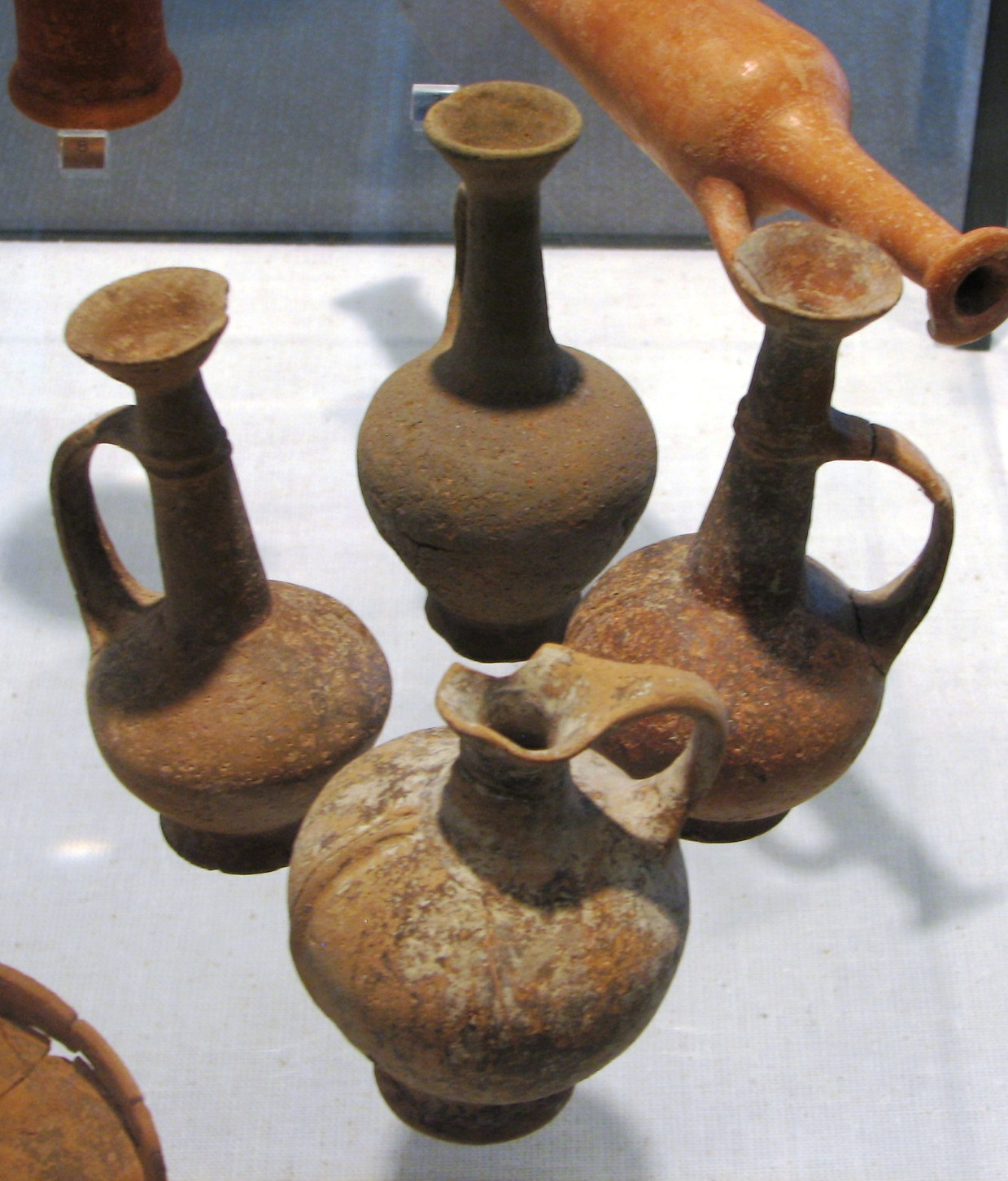
Bilbil juglets - Late Bronze Period Pottery in Hecht Museum, Haifa, Israel - Base Ring ware; Late Bronze Age IIB c. 1400–1200 BC

This is a selection of handmade pottery in different ware styles. These styles are called: Base Ring, White Slip, Monochrome, White Shaved, White Painted, Bucchero. Of these different kinds, Monochrome, White Slip, and Base Ring were most used. It appears as though this type of pottery was found to be decorative in nature rather than useful. "Bilbil juglets" are an example of Base Ring ware, which are pottery and have long slim necks. Archaeologists speculate that bilbil juglets may have been used in the trade of opium, due to traces of opiates found in some of the styles of the jugs, as well as the shape of the vessel resembling an upturned Papaver somniferum.

Distribution of pottery Neolithic sites in Southern Levant

=== Mycenaean imports ===
This pottery was produced on inland Greece and throughout the Aegean islands. The fabrication technique used was fast-wheel, with fine well-levigated clay. The slip was of a light cream color to give the background to the exquisite decoration normally done in dark-brown color. Vessel types were small and closed flasks or "stirrup jars". Towards the end of the Bronze Age there is evidence that Mycenaean Late Helladic IIIC pottery was being made by local potters from Canaanite clays. Either this indicates a resident population of Mycenaean potters in the so-called Philistine cities, or else it reflects an ethnic movement of new cultural elements into this region.

== Iron Age ==
=== Iron Age I (1150–950 BC) ===
Two new major pottery groups appear in Canaan at this time. They have been related to the settlement of the Philistines and Israelites.

==== Philistine Bichrome ware ====
Philistine Bichrome ware is the descendant of the imported Mycenaean ware of the past period, which is known also as Mycenaean IIIC1b. This new style of pottery is made locally. Neutron analysis proves that it could have even been made in the same workshop. It began at approximately the 12th century BC and began to disappear towards the end of the 11th century BC. The style is slightly influenced by Egypt but mostly by Canaanite. The Mycenaean tradition holds a firm grasp over the shape of the pottery (for example "stirrup jar"), whereas bottles are found to share Cypriot styles (seen by tall and narrow necks). The decoration of this new ware has changed to red and black paints on a whitish slip. Birds and fish are found to be common on Mycenaean IIIC1b but less on the new style, in fact by the second half of the 11th century the bird which was once thought to be sacred disappeared from the pottery.

==== Israelite pottery ====
The new Israelite settlers began by using basic types of Canaanite pottery until they began developing simple copies of the purchased pottery so as to meet their needs. The hallmark of this early Israelite style is the pithoi. They are scattered over these sites. Many of the storage jars had The "Collared Rim", which were most popular to the central part of Israel, although they have since also been found to also have been manufactured in areas outside of the Israelite settlement area.

=== Iron Age II (1000–586 BC) ===
During the period of the United Monarchy, Israelite pottery improved. Finishing techniques used a remarkable amount of red slip, applied by hand and smoothed with an irregular burnish. At the division of the kingdom, however, pottery styles broke into two separate traditions.

Samaria ware is a general name given to the pottery of Israel (the northern kingdom), even though there is a wide variety of forms and styles. They can be put into two separate groups. The first is thick walled, with a high foot and red slip (sometimes burnished), most often shaped as bowls. The second is made of fine particles clay, and decorated with concentric stripes of red/yellowish colored slip.

Judean pottery is altogether different, and slowly progresses into more and more sophisticated types/styles. By the 8th/7th centuries BC, Jerusalem pottery was especially good. All over the southern kingdom, a technique known as "wheel burnish" was used. This term describes how an orange/red slip was applied, while the pot was on the wheel, and then burnished to a gloss using the potter's hands or smooth tools.

== Classic period ==
During the Roman and early Byzantine period, the Levant was on the edge of the enormous territories where ancient Roman pottery was produced and used, often being transported long distances by sea. As in other areas, local traditions and mass-produced Roman styles co-existed, but the Levant never became a major centre producing wares for export, as the area of modern Tunisia did with its African red slip ware, and modern Turkey with Phocaean red slip, both often excavated in the Levant. However, the Levant was a production centre for large blocks of bulk raw Roman glass, which were shipped to various centres to be worked.

Common kitchen ware of the Galilee region was produced primarily in Kafr 'Inan (Kefar Hananya). One item produced there, the "Kefar Hananya I CE type", is also known as the "Galilean bowl". This coarse ware network was one of many sub-regional and micro-regional coarse and fine ware ceramic culture networks in operation in the Levant.

== Middle Ages ==
=== Arab period ===
In exploring the similarities throughout the different eras, Macalister discusses Palestinian pottery in the Arab period and its shared characteristics with the ancient and modern pottery produced in Palestine. Of the pottery from the Arab period, he notes: "...there seem to have been large globular jars, not unlike the Pre-Semitic and First Semitic barrel-shaped jars." He describes them as having "ledge-handles, though of a different shape from the early ledge-handles," and continues to write that, "... this kind of handle is still made in native pottery." Further, he notes that jar-covers from this period are strikingly similar to those of the "earliest type of ware", the "Second Semitic jar-covers, with two loops in the middle of the saucer."

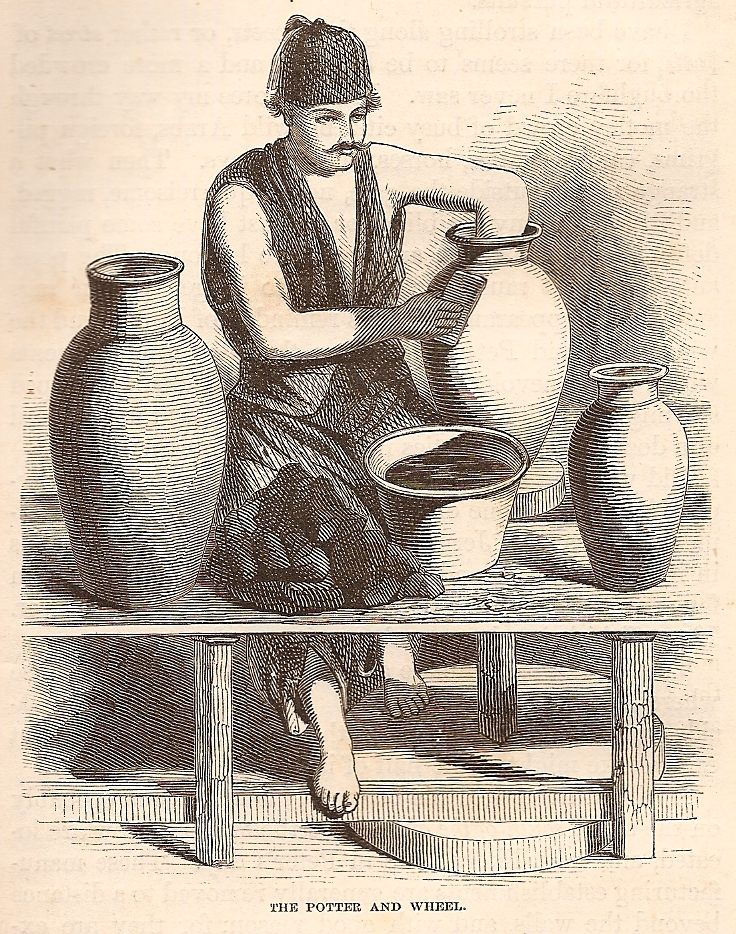
The Potter and Wheel, Jaffa, in 1859. From Thomson, p. 282.

The lamps produced during the Arab period are "either of the Hellenistic type, with long spout, or the Byzantine slipper form." The "Third Semitic lamp" which almost completely disappears during the Hellenistic period, comes into use once again during the Arab period and Macalister notes that it is still frequently used among the Arab inhabitants of Palestine.

Some of the linear decoration techniques also show a "startling resemblance to the painted ornament of the Second Semitic Period." Macalister notes that the major differences are that "The slip and the paint have a fatter, richer texture in the Arab ware than in the Amorite, and the painted devices are more geometrical, more mechanical, and also more minute and 'finicking' in the later than in the earlier pottery." As for similarities with the Roman period, horizontal ribbing, a key characteristic of Roman era pottery, "is as common in this period as in the Roman, but it seems to differ in outline."

== Modern era ==
Modern Palestinian pots, bowls, jugs and cups, particularly those produced prior to the establishment of Israel in 1948, are similar in shape, fabric and decoration to their ancient equivalents. Winifred Needler, Deputy Keeper of the Near Eastern Department at the Royal Ontario Museum of Archaeology writes in Palestine: Ancient and Modern (1949) that this continuity demonstrates "how persistently the potter's craft clung to tradition through the centuries." R.A. Stewart Macalister, in his work The Excavation of Gezer (1912), underlines this point prefacing his overview of Palestinian pottery throughout the ages by noting that:

... the division into periods [of Palestinian pottery] is to some extent a necessary evil, in that it suggests a misleading idea of discontinuity—as though the periods were so many water-tight compartments with fixed partitions between them. In point of fact, each period shades almost imperceptibly into the next.

Commenting further on modern examples of Palestinian pottery, Needler notes that the clay used is of much the same composition as the ancient examples and is shaped, smoothed and baked in the same way, with the surfaces often decorated in similar painted, incised, or moulded techniques. "Ramallah" ware, a think-walled, pinkish drab pottery painted with simple geometric and plant designs in red, is handmade; as are the "frying pan" and the home-made braziers. Other pottery is wheel-made, largely undecorated, but often with a glossy black glaze and crude designs in bright red.

The Palestinian Association for Cultural Exchange (PACE) has put together a collection of traditional pottery, including cooking pots, jugs, mugs and plates that are manufactured by men and women from historic villages like al-Jib (Gibeon), Beitin (Bethel) and Senjel. They are handmade and fired in open, charcoal-fueled kilns as in ancient times.

Palestinian ceramics are produced at traditional family-owned factories in Hebron and other cities. Covering a wide range of colorful hand-painted plates, vases, hanging ornaments, tiles, cups, jars and framed mirrors, the ceramics are known for the intricate detail of their flower and arabesque patterns.

Palestinian artists who produce contemporary clay sculpture, like Vera Tamari from Ramallah, have incorporated the clay shards from ancient pieces into their work. Says Tamari,

My own artwork is inspired by seeing the history in Palestinian land. For a time, I used a lot of shards of pottery as a theme in my clay work. You find shards of pottery everywhere because Palestine has had so many thousand of years of history that you walk on a hill and you just find these little pieces of pottery that are evidence of life that was there — pieces of jars, of plates, of bowls.

Dina Ghazal from Nablus use another approach, believing that abstraction will best express the essence of her ideas. The qualities of the material she works with are very important for Ghazal, she explains that her work is an attempt to show the versatility of the medium and she hopes to challenge traditional perceptions of the use of the clay.

== See also ==
- Typology
- Syro-Palestinian archaeology
- Israeli ceramics
- Stone vessels in ancient Judaea
- Tell el-Yahudiyeh Ware

== Gallery ==
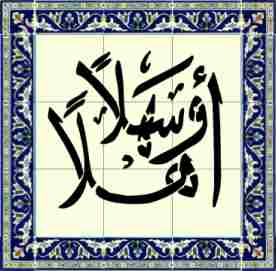
Arabic calligraphy on Ceramic

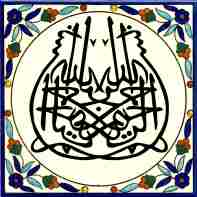
Islamic calligraphy on Ceramic

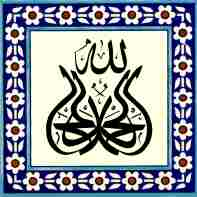
Islamic calligraphy on Ceramic

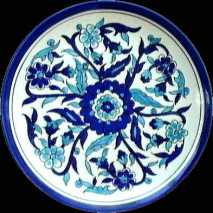
A ceramic plate

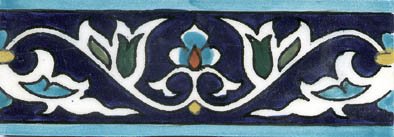
A tile border

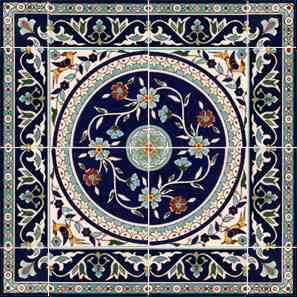
Ceramic tiles

== Bibliography ==
- Macalister, R. A. Stewart (1912). The Excavation of Gezer: 1902 - 1905 and 1907 - 1909 (PDF). John Murray, Albemarle Street West, London.
- Needler, Winifred (1949). Palestine: Ancient and Modern. Royal Ontario Museum of Archaeology. pp. 75–76.
- Jacob Neusner; Bruce Chilton; William Scott Green, eds. (2008). Historical knowledge in biblical antiquity (Illustrated ed.). Deo Pub. ISBN 978-1-905679-00-3.
- Wickham, Chris (2007). Framing the Early Middle Ages: Europe and the Mediterranean, 400-800 (Illustrated, reprint ed.). Oxford University Press. ISBN 978-0-19-921296-5.
