= Ezion-Geber =

Biblical seaport on the northern extremity of the Gulf of Eilat

Coordinates: 29°32′50″N 34°58′49″E

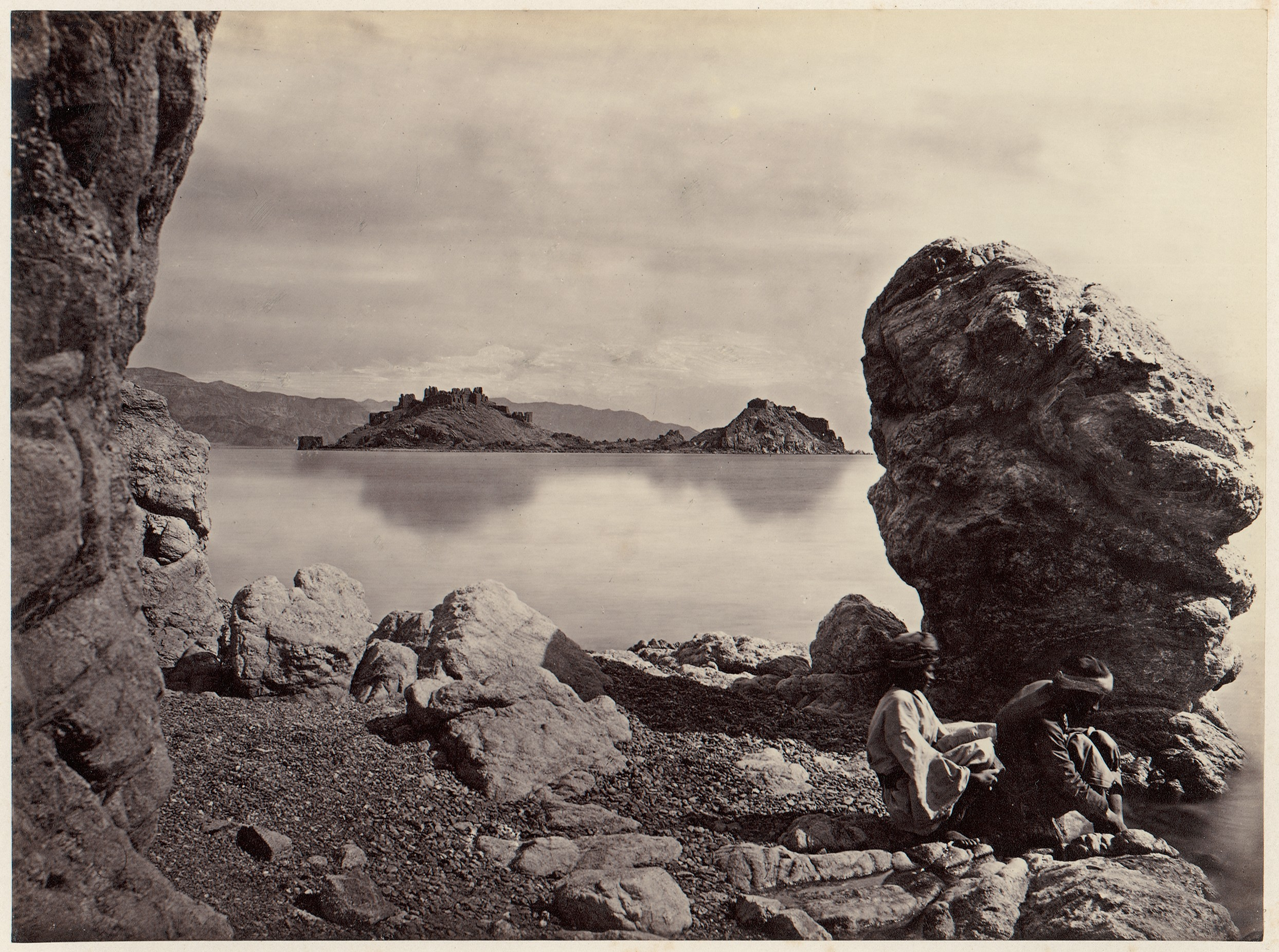
Pharaoh's Island in the Gulf of Eilat/Aqaba

Ezion-Geber (Hebrew: עֶצְיֹן גֶּבֶר, Modern: ʻEṣyōn Gevér, Tiberian: ʿEṣyōn Geḇer, Biblical: Ġeṣyōn Geḇer; also Asiongaber) is a city only known from the Hebrew Bible, in Idumea, a seaport on the northern extremity of the Gulf of Eilat/Aqaba, in modern terms somewhere in the area of modern Aqaba and Eilat.

According to Targum Jonathan, the name means "city of the rooster" (כְּרַך תַּרְנְגוֹלָא).

== Biblical references ==
Ezion-Geber is mentioned six times in the Tanakh. According to the Book of Numbers, Ezion-Geber was a place first mentioned as an Israelite campsite toward the close of the nation's 40 years in the wilderness after the Exodus from Egypt.

The "ships of Tharshish" of Solomon and Hiram started from this port on their voyage to Ophir. It was the main port for Israel's commerce with the countries bordering on the Red Sea and Indian Ocean. According to Book of II Chronicles, Jehoshaphat, the King of Judah, joined with Ahaziah, the King of Israel, to make ships in Ezion-geber; but God disapproved of the alliance, and the ships were broken in the port.

In 1 Kings 9:26 (King James Version) it says:

And king Solomon made a navy of ships in Eziongeber, which is beside Eloth, on the shore of the Red sea, in the land of Edom.
And Hiram sent in the navy his servants, shipmen that had knowledge of the sea, with the servants of Solomon.
And they came to Ophir, and fetched from thence gold, four hundred and twenty talents, and brought it to king Solomon.

== Archaeological search ==
The location of Ezion-Geber is debated and has yet to be confirmed by archaeology.

=== Tell el-Kheleifeh ===
Ruins at Tell el-Kheleifeh were identified with Ezion-Geber by the German explorer F. Frank and later excavated by Nelson Glueck, who thought he had confirmed the identification, but a later re-evaluation dates them to a period between the 8th and 6th centuries BCE with occupation continuing possibly into the 4th century BCE. However, Marta Luciani argues that old and newly identified samples of Qurayya ware at the site indicate that it was occupied from the Late Bronze Age onwards.

=== Pharaoh's Island ===
Alternatively, some scholars identify Pharaoh's Island with biblical Ezion-Geber.
