= Edom (disambiguation) =

Edom is the name given to Esau and the nation descending from him in the Hebrew Bible.

Edom may also refer to:

- Edom, Texas, a city in northeast Texas
- Edom Hill, a peak in the Indio Hills in Riverside County, California
- Thousand Palms, California, which was once called Edom

== People with the surname ==
- Clifton C. Edom, American photojournalism educator

== See also ==
- Edomite language, an ancient Semitic language of Edom
- Edomite pottery, type of ancient Middle Eastern pottery
