= Palestinian handicrafts =

Handmade products of Palestine

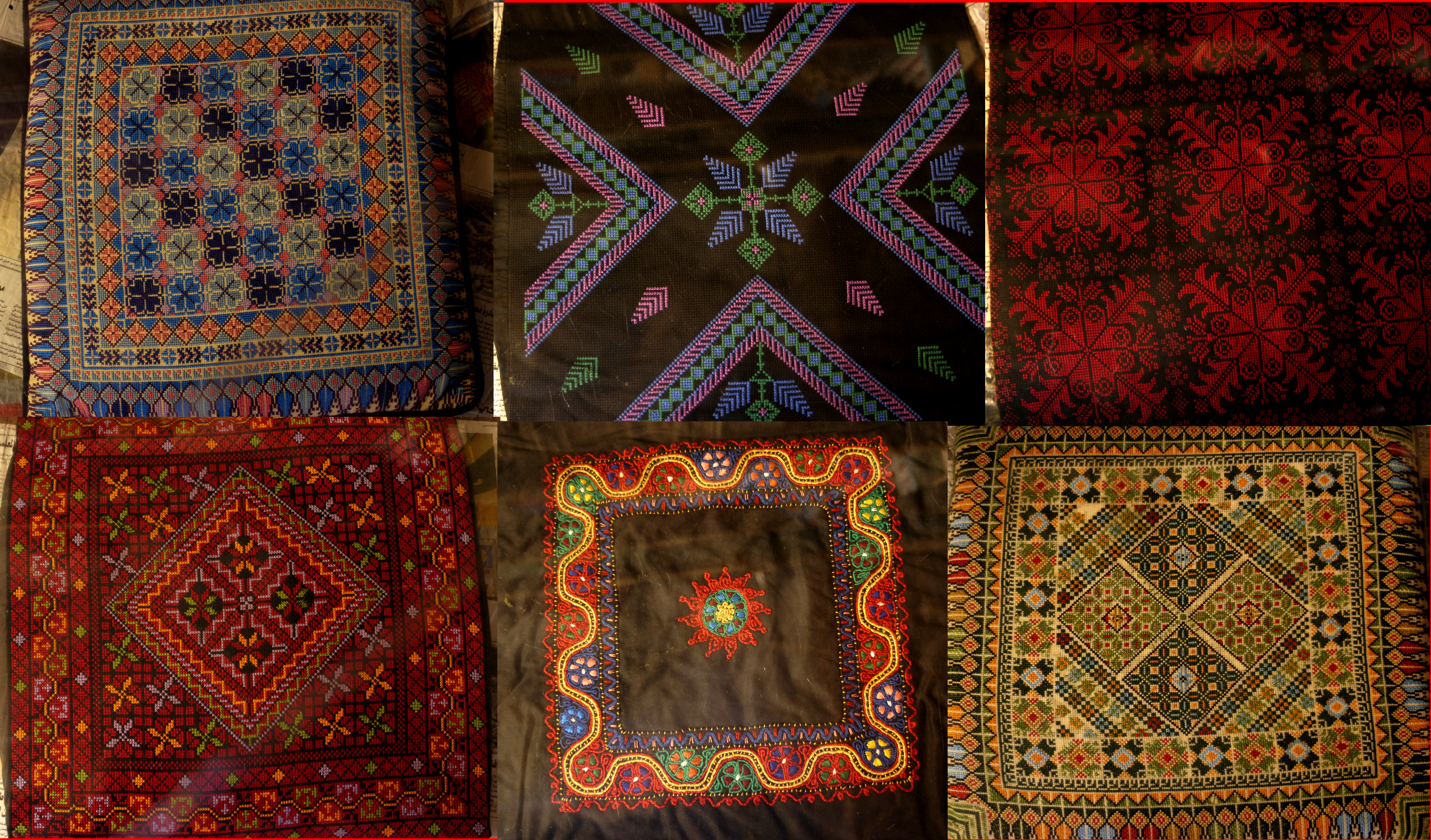
Palestinian embroidery

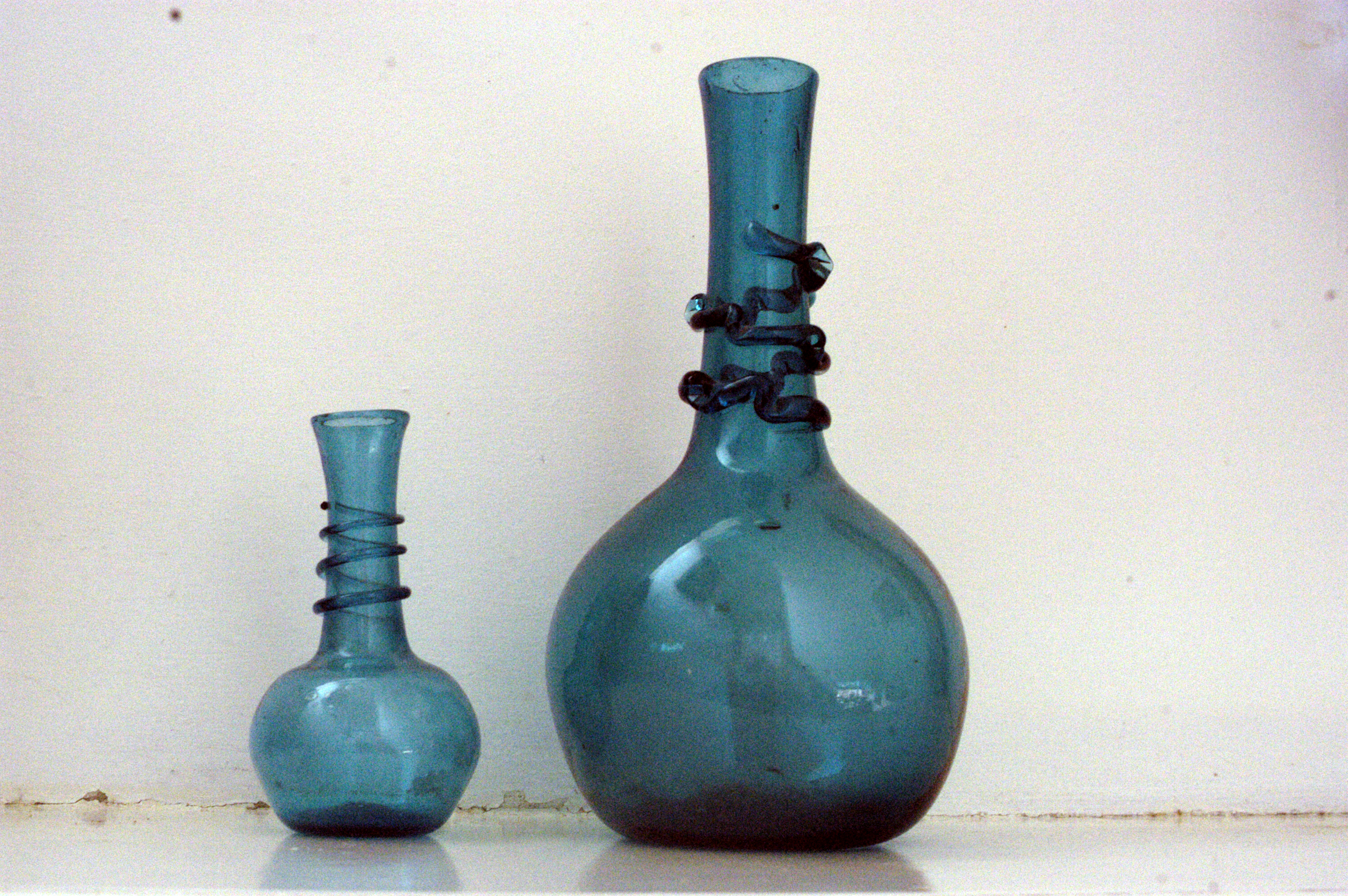
Hebron glass

Palestinian handicrafts are handicrafts produced by Palestinians. A wide variety of handicrafts, many of which have been produced by Palestine's inhabitants in Palestine for hundreds of years, continue to be produced today. Palestinian handicrafts include embroidery work, pottery-making, soap-making, glass-making, weaving, and olive-wood and Mother of Pearl carvings, among others. Some Palestinian cities in the West Bank, particularly Bethlehem, Hebron and Nablus have gained renown for specializing in the production of a particular handicraft, with the sale and export of such items forming a key part of each cities' economy.

== Embroidery and weaving ==
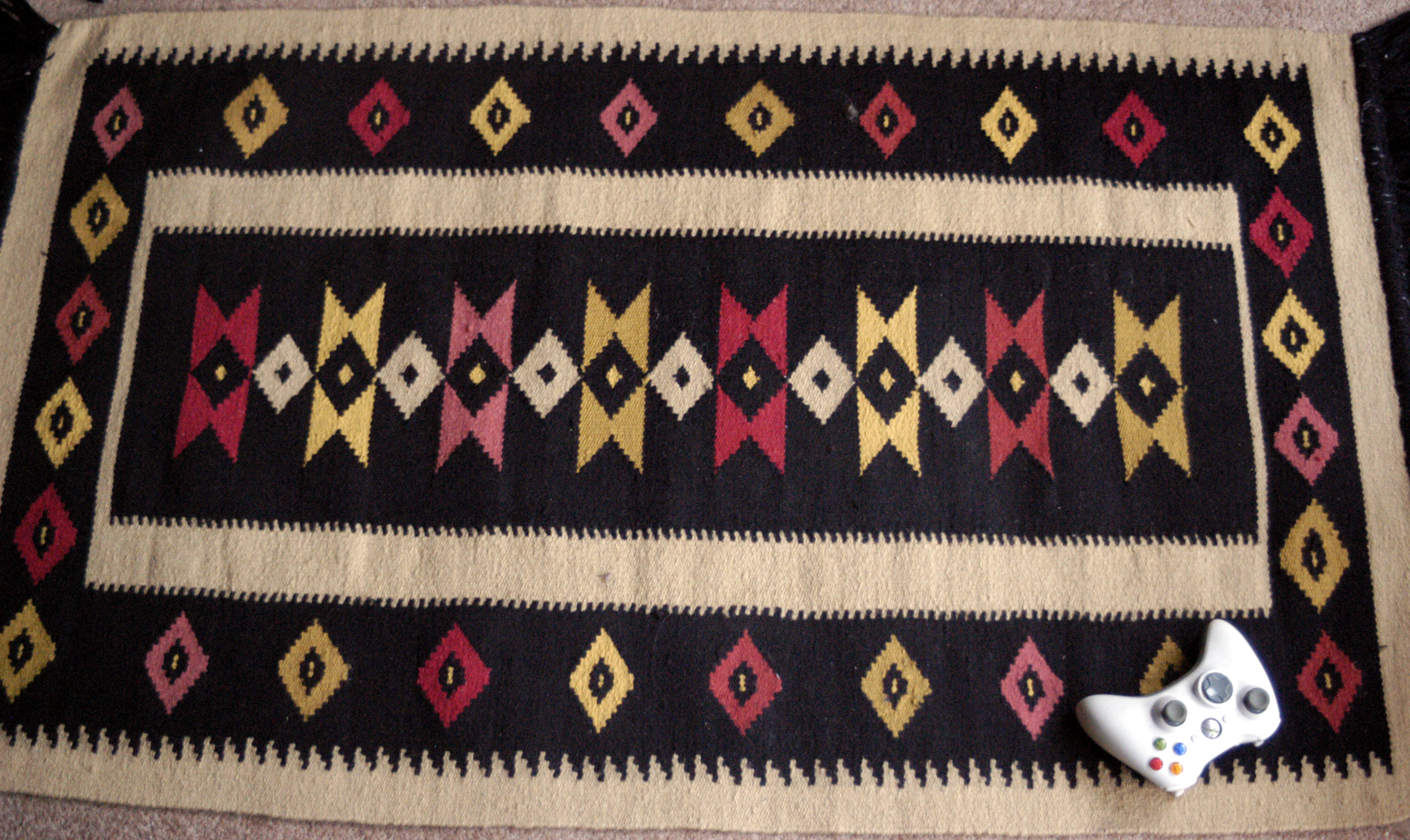
Woolen rug from Gaza

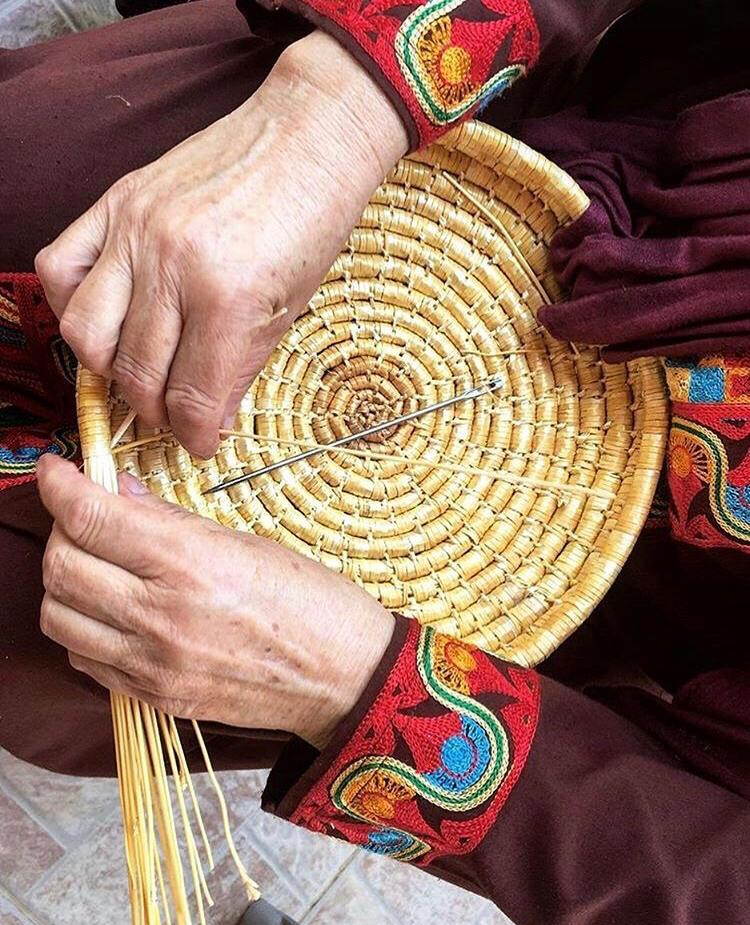
A Palestinian woman weaving a straw basket

An exclusively female artistic tradition, embroidery has been a key feature of traditional Palestinian costumes for centuries. Two main types of embroidery are tatreez (cross-stitch embroidery) and tahriri (couching-stitch embroidery).

The production of cloth for traditional Palestinian costumes and for export throughout the Arab world was a key industry of the destroyed village of Majdal. Malawi weaving, as the technique is known, is woven by a male weaver on a single treadle loom, using black and indigo cotton threads combined with fuchsia and turquoise silk threads. While the village no longer exists today, the craft of Majdalawi weaving continues as part of a cultural preservation project run by the Atfaluna Crafts organization and the Arts and Crafts Village in Gaza City.

Gaza was a center for cloth production, famous for a fine silk produced there that was known as gazzatum. Imported to Europe as early as the 13th century, this fabric later gave its name to the loose weave fabric known today as gauze.

Weaving was traditionally carried out by bedouin women to create household items suited for the life in the desert. The thread is spun from sheep's wool, colored with natural dyes, and woven into a fabric using a ground loom and the strong fabric produced is used for tents, rugs, pillows, and other domestic items.

A Galilee craftsman who learned the art of straw weaving from his grandmother is showing an exhibit of tabaqs (woven trays) and other items at the Ein Dor Archaeological Museum, based on heirloom weaving techniques.

== Glass-making ==
A key Hebron industry, glass has been produced in the city since the Roman rule in Palestine. As the quote says: "If Hebron could boast of its glass bracelets, its big he-goat skins, and its fine grapes; if Gaza was still the granary of Palestine; if Lydda was reputed for its oil markets and mat industry; Nablus could point with pride to its soap manufactories."

Hebron has continued for centuries to be considered as a center for high quality glass making.

== Olive-wood carving ==
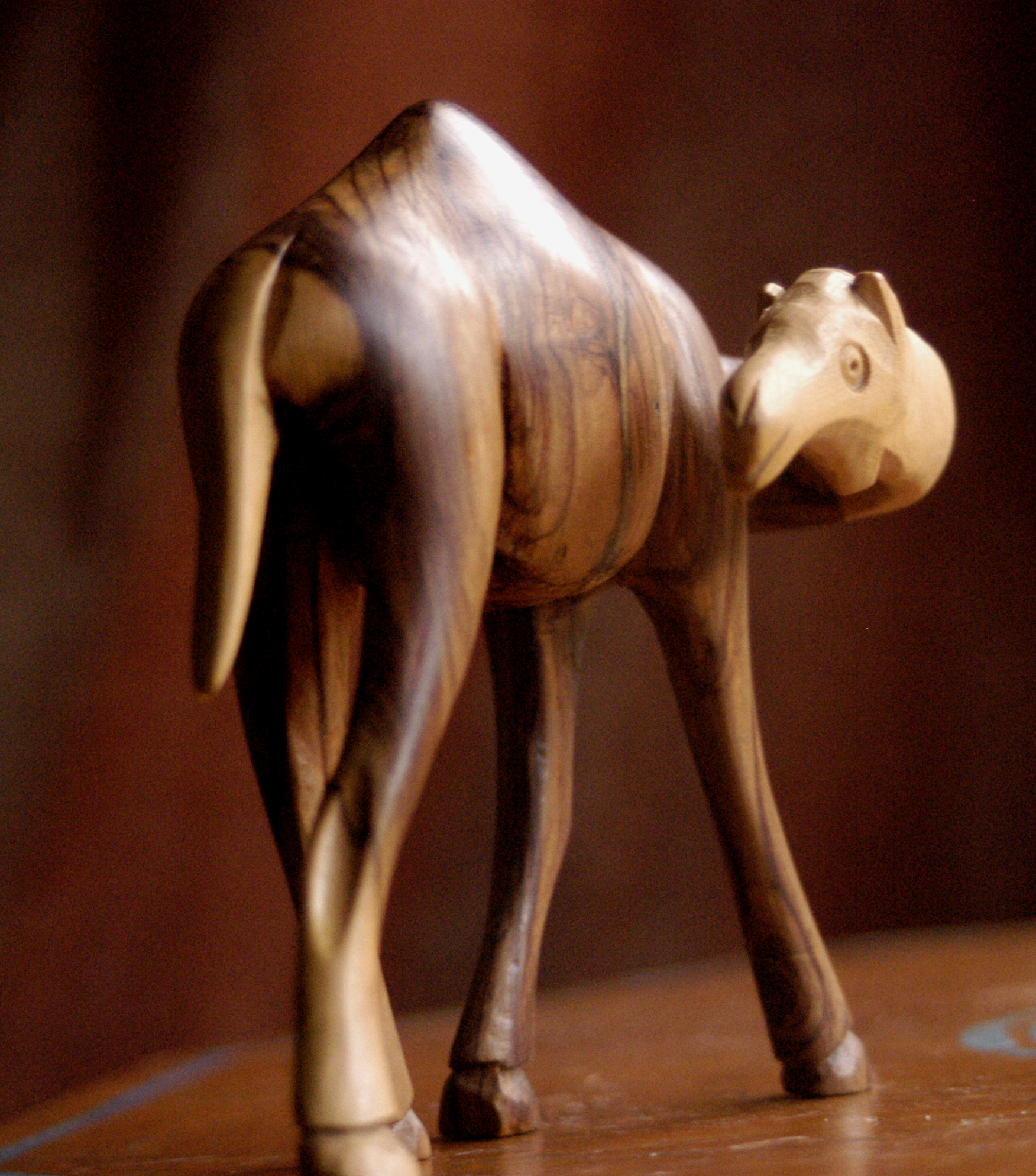
Olive wood camel made in Bethlehem

According to the Bethlehem municipality, olive-wood carving is thought to have begun in Bethlehem in the 4th century CE, following the construction of the Church of the Nativity. At the time, Christian monks taught how to make craft to the city's residents. Though its exact origins are obscure, one of the earliest olive-wood handicrafts were rosary beads carved from olive pits.

Olive-wood is ideal for craft-making being resistant to decay and receptive to a number of surfacing treatments. The wood is usually carved using simple hand tools. Today, rough cutting is carried out using machines programmed with a design model, though fine work, such as work with facial structures, must be chiseled by hand.

Olive-wood carvings sold to tourists are important to Bethlehem's economic industry. A number of artists in the city continue to make over a thousand different crafts, such as boxes, picture frames, covers for historical and old books, candle holders, rosaries, urns, vases and Christmas ornaments. Biblical scenes depicting Jesus, Mary, Joseph, and the three Magi are also integrated into their work.

== Pottery ==
Palestinian pottery shows a remarkable continuity throughout the ages. Modern Palestinian pots, bowls, jugs and cups, particularly those produced prior to the establishment of Israel in 1948, are similar in shape, fabric and decoration to their ancient equivalents. Cooking pots, jugs, mugs and plates that are still hand-made, are fired in an opened, charcoal-fueled kilns/ovens as in ancient times in historic villages like al-Jib (Gibeon), Beitin (Bethel) and Sinjil.

== Soap-making ==
Nabulsi soap is a type of castile soap produced only in Nablus in the West Bank. An olive oil-based soap, it is made up of three primary ingredients: virgin olive oil, water, and a sodium compound. Nabulsi workers who make the soap are proud of its unique smell, which they see as a signifier of the quality and purity of its ingredients.

Known for being a fine product, since as early as the 10th century, Nabulsi soap has been exported across the Arab world and even to Europe. Though the number of soap factories has plummeted from a peak of thirty in the 19th century to only two today, efforts to preserve this historic part of Palestinian and Nabulsi cultural heritage continue. Until today, in Nablus, you can find Nabulsi soap stacked into towers by street vendors, awaiting purchase.

== Bamboo furniture ==
Palestinians have a long history in creating both furniture and household objects. This skill was handed down for generations, although has dwindled in recent years. Bamboo made its way to the area from the Far East along the Silk Road and was processed by the buyers. The bamboo is boiled, scraped, burnt and then dried in order to harden it into shapes. No machines are used in the production of Palestinian furniture, it is completely man-made by between one and three men.

== Stonemasonry ==
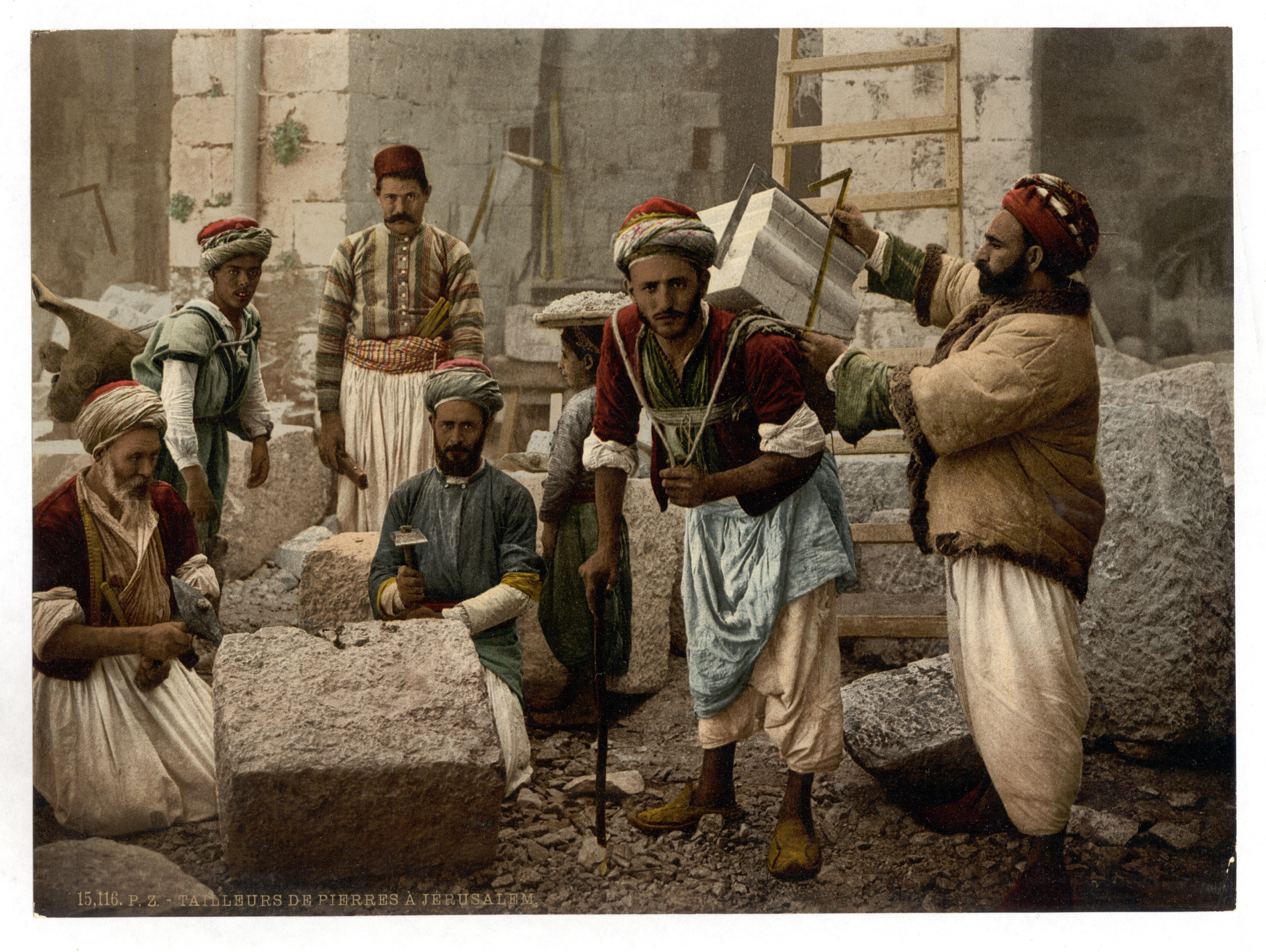
Stonemasons in Palestine, 1890-1900

The craft of stonemasonry is practiced by Palestinians in areas like Beit Jala and Beit Fajjar. Certain styles of bricks such as tubzeh (طبزة), mesamsam (مسمسم), and taltish (تلطيش) are chiseled by hand rather than via a machine.

== Bibliography ==
- Garrison, Webb B. (2008). Why You Say It. READ BOOKS. ISBN 9781443731829.
- Jacobs, Daniel; Eber, Shirley; Silvani, Francesca (1998). Israel and the Palestinian Territories: the rough guide. London: Rough Guides. ISBN 1-85828-248-9.
- Karmi, Ghada (2005). In Search of Fatima: A Palestinian Story. Verso. ISBN 1-85984-694-7.
- Kawar, Widad Kamel (2011). Threads of Identity. Preserving Palestinian Costume & Heritage. Rimal. ISBN 978-9963-610-41-9.
- Needler, Winifred (1949). "Palestine: Ancient and Modern". Royal Ontario Museum of Archaeology.
- Pollock, Susan; Bernbeck, Reinhard (2004). Archaeologies of the Middle East: Critical Perspectives. Blackwell Publishing. ISBN 0-631-23001-7.
