= Tell el-Kheleifeh =

Archaeological site in Jordan

Coordinates: 29°32′50″N 34°58′49″E

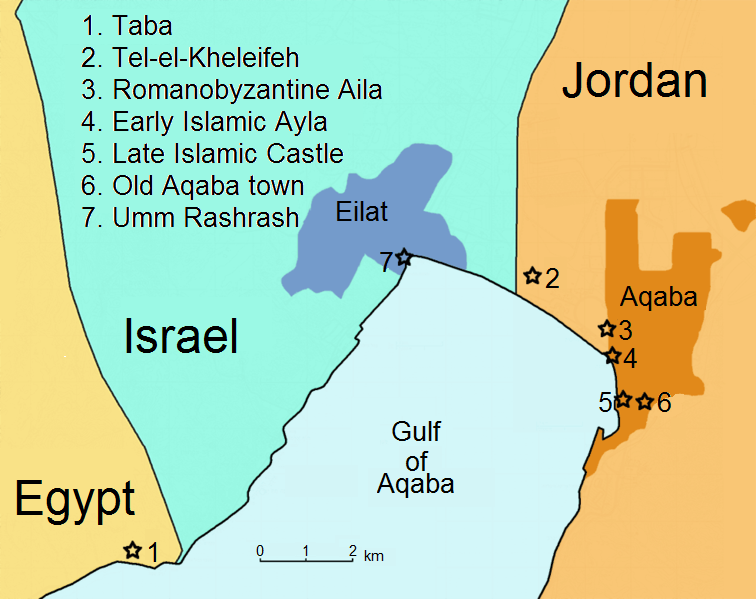
Location of Tell el-Kheleifeh

Tell el-Kheleifeh (also Tell el-Chulefi) is an archaeological site in Jordan at the head of the Gulf of Aqaba immediately northwest of the city of Aqaba. Its older identification with the 10th-century port from the biblical King Solomon narrative does not stand up to newer archaeological assessments, while its identification with biblical Ezion-geber and/or Elath of a later date remains a matter of speculative interpretation.

== Archaeological field investigation ==
During his excavations in 1933, the researcher Fritz Frank stated that he believed the ruins were those of Ezion-geber. During his excavations from 1938 to 1940, American archaeologist Nelson Glueck adopted the same thesis. He distinguished five settlement periods, which he dated to between the 10th and 5th centuries BCE.

== Periods ==
In 1985, Gary Pratico presented a comprehensive reassessment of the architectural and ceramic finds. Particularly in the case of ceramics, he came to a shorter dating of the settlement through comparative studies with numerous other sites from Israel and Jordan. According to his results, largely reconfirmed and expanded on in 2014 by Israel Finkelstein, two main phases of habitation can be assumed, with one or two additional minor ones:

=== 12th century BCE settlement (?) ===
Sparse ceramic findings without associated architectural remains might hint at a small settlement existing at the site or nearby during the 12th century BCE, and possibly into the 11th. In any case, there are no material remains from ca. 1000–800 BCE, a time span that includes the time of both Solomon and Jehoshaphat. Marta Luciani argues that old and newly identified samples of Qurayya ware at the site indicate that it was occupied during the Late Bronze Age.

=== Casemate fortress (early 8th century BCE) ===
The first architectural remains are of a casemate fortress, tentatively dated by to the first half of the 8th century BCE. A 45 × 45–metre offset-inset, or "salients and recesses" wall was abutted on the inside by a continuous row of rooms, these constituting the "casemate" element from its name ("casemate wall"). In the centre of the courtyard stood a four-room building, almost square and measuring approximately 13 × 13 metres, possibly serving as a citadel.

=== Fortified settlement (c. 700 BCE) ===
The earlier fortress was replaced by a radically different fortified settlement of much larger proportions, 56 × 59 × 59 × 63 m. This was protected by an offset-inset wall and a fortified four-chambered gateway. Large parts of the older casemate fortress and its four-room building were preserved and used in the northwestern corner of the new, enlarged structure. Finkelstein identifies it as the Assyrian fort of Ezion-geber, guarding the trade routes with Arabia along with the forts at Tamar (Ein Hatzeva) and Khirbet en-Nahas, as part of a strategic Assyrian domination system built between the very end of the 8th and the first half of the 7th century BCE. Finkelstein dates the end of this phase to the late 7th century, Pratico to the early 6th.

=== Persian period settlement ===
Pottery and Aramaic ostraca attest to the presence of a settlement during the Persian period (5th–4th century BCE), but there is no certainty whether the fortress walls were still standing or if the buildings, of which not much remained by the time of the excavations, were erected on top of its ruins. After this period, activity at the head of the Gulf of Aqaba is confined to Aila/Aqaba, some 500 metres southeast of the tell.

== Bibliography ==
- Nelson Glueck: "The First Campaign at Tell el-Kheleifeh (Ezion-Geber)". In: Bulletin of the American Schools of Oriental Research. (1938) 71, pp. 3–17.
- Nelson Glueck: "The Second Campaign at Tell el-Kheleifeh (Ezion-Geber: Elath)". In: Bulletin of the American Schools of Oriental Research. (1939) 75, pp. 8–22.
- Nelson Glueck: "The Third Season of Excavation at Tell el-Kheleifeh". In: Bulletin of the American Schools of Oriental Research. (1940) 79, S. 2–18.
- Nelson Glueck: "Tell el-Kheleifeh". In: Michael Avi-Yonah, Ephraim Stern (eds.): Encyclopedia of Archaeological Excavations in the Holy Land. The Israel Exploration Society and Massada Press, Jerusalem 1977, pp. 713–717.
- Gary D. Pratico: "Nelson Glueck's 1938–1940 Excavations at Tell el-Kheleifeh: A Reappraisal". In: Bulletin of the American Schools of Oriental Research. Bd. 259, 1985, ISSN 0003-097X, pp. 1–32. doi:10.2307/1356795
- Israel Finkelstein: "The Archaeology of Tell el-Kheleifeh and the History of Ezion-geber/Elath". In: Semitica 56, 2014, pp. 105–136. Accessed March 2021 via academia.edu.
- Marta Luciani: "Pottery from the “Midianite Heartland”? On Tell Kheleifeh and Qurayyah Painted Ware. New Evidence from the Harvard Semitic Museum". In: Laïla Nehmé, Ahmad Al-Jallad (eds.): To the Madbar and Back Again: Studies in the languages, archaeology, and cultures of Arabia dedicated to Michael C.A. Macdonald. Brill, Leiden 2017, pp. 392–438.
