= Negevite pottery =

Type of ancient Middle Eastern pottery

Negevite pottery, Negev pottery, Negebite ware, etc. are the names given to a hand-made ware, i.e. without using the potter's wheel, found in Iron Age sites of the Negev desert, southern Jordan, and the Shfela of Israel. However, its use was not limited to the Iron Age, starting instead in the Early Bronze Age and continuing uninterruptedly until the Early Muslim period.

It was produced from coarse clay containing straw and other organic materials. It was discovered by C. Leonard Woolley and T. E. Lawrence in the northeastern Sinai, found again by Nelson Glueck in Tell el-Kheleifeh, and at last identified by Yohanan Aharoni as the wares manufactured and used by the people of the desert. Negevite wares show some similarities with Midianite pottery bowls (in form) and with Edomite pottery (in decoration).

Negevite cylindrical vessels found at excavations of Iron Age IIA sites in the Negev Highlands represent the largest and most dominant ceramic assemblage of simple-shaped vessels discovered in Israel.

== Date and significance ==
Negevite pottery has been used in the Negev, without typological changes, from the Early Bronze II and Middle Bronze I ages throughout the Early Muslim period. This means that it can not be used independently as a marker for the Iron Age or any other period for that matter, and can itself only be dated indirectly, based on the wheel-made pottery found in the same stratigraphic context, which is mostly non-local and is period-specific.

However, Negevite pottery is found everywhere at Iron Age sites in the Negev, importantly in the mining sites of the Timna valley in Arabah, and Tell el-kheleife in southern Jordan, and constitutes almost the only source of information about the nomadic pastoralists who lived there, available to the archaeologists. Juan Manuel Tebes suggests that Negevite ware was produced in pastoral households for domestic use, and that the movements of the pastoral groups dictates its geographical distribution.
