= Edomite pottery =

Type of ancient Middle Eastern pottery

Edomite pottery, also known as 'Busayra Painted Ware' and 'Southern Transjordan-Negev Pottery' (STNP), is the name given to several ware types found in archaeological sites in southern Jordan and the Negev dated to the 7th and 6th centuries BCE. It is attributed to the Biblical people of the Edomites.

It consists of several ware types, of which the most representative ones are the plain wares, usually kraters and bowls with a denticulated fringe applied around the vessel; bowls with red and black-painted geometric decorations; cooking-pots with a stepped-rim; and vessels, mainly carinated bowls, influenced by “Assyrian ware” pottery.

It was first identified by archaeologist Nelson Glueck in the 1930s-1940s.

It has been noticed that Negevite pottery shows some similarities with Edomite pottery (in decoration) and with Midianite pottery bowls (in form).
