= Nelson Glueck =

American rabbi, academic and archaeologist (1900–1971)

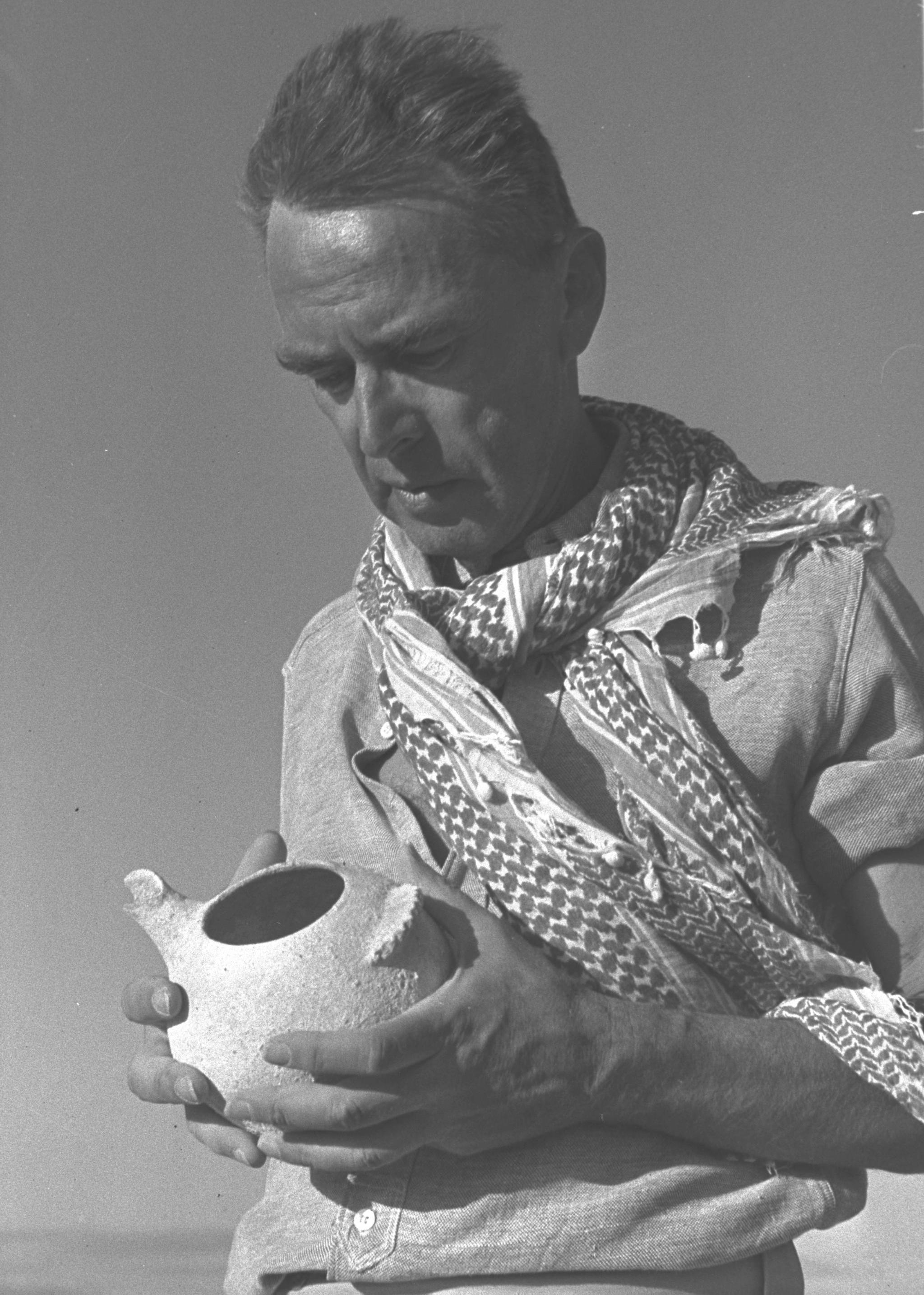
- Glueck in Israel, 1956

5th President of Hebrew Union College - Jewish Institute of Religion
- In office 1947 – February 12, 1971
- Preceded by: Julian Morgenstern
- Succeeded by: Alfred Gottschalk

Personal details
- Born: June 4, 1900 Cincinnati, Ohio, U.S.
- Died: February 12, 1971 (aged 70) Cincinnati, Ohio, U.S.
- Spouse: Helen Iglauer (m.1931)
- Children: 1
- Education: Hebrew Union College (BHL); University of Cincinnati (BA); University of Jena (PhD)
- Occupation: Rabbi, archaeologist

Nelson Glueck (June 4, 1900 – February 12, 1971) was an American rabbi, academic and archaeologist. He served as president of Hebrew Union College from 1947 until his death, and his pioneering work in biblical archaeology resulted in the discovery of 1,500 ancient sites.

== Biography ==
Nelson Glueck was born in Cincinnati, Ohio to Lithuanian Jewish parents.

He died in Cincinnati in 1971, after announcing plans to step down from the HUC presidency and four months after his final trip to Israel. He was succeeded as president of HUC by Rabbi Alfred Gottschalk.

== Rabbinic career ==
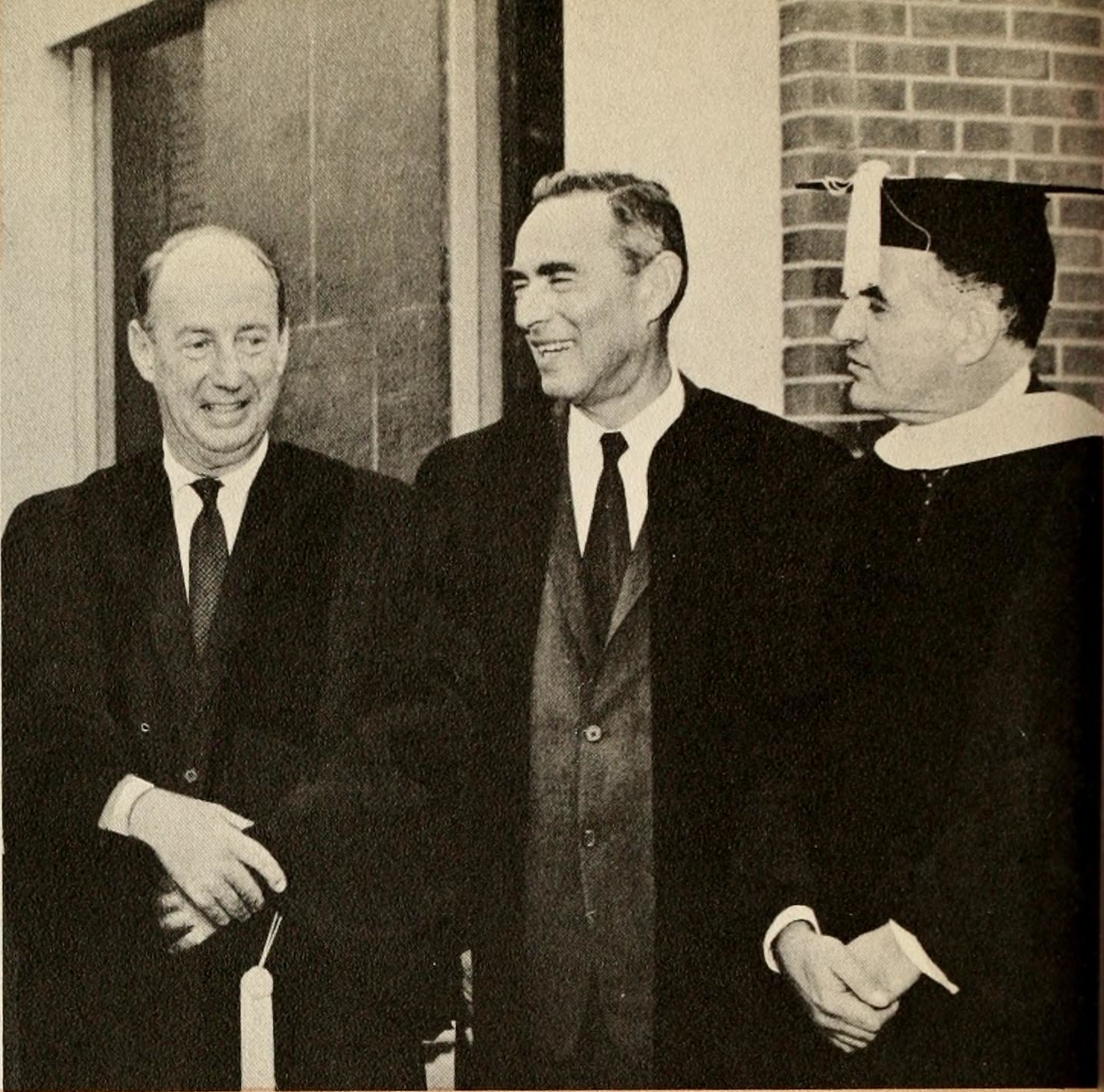
Nelson Glueck (center), 1961

Glueck developed a passion for religion early in life, and was ordained as a Reform rabbi in 1923. He received his Ph.D. from the University of Jena in Germany in 1926. By 1928 he was a member of the Hebrew Union College faculty, teaching at the seminary of the Reform Jewish movement.

== Archaeology career ==
In the course of his career, he became an expert on ancient pottery; he was able to match small ceramic fragments to distinct time periods. He was the first to identify some ancient wares such as Edomite and Midianite pottery, re-discovered what is now called Negevite pottery, and surveyed many unknown sites in the Transjordan. During World War II, Glueck used his intimate knowledge of Palestine's geography to help the Office of Strategic Services develop a contingency plan for a retreat from German field marshal Rommel's advance through Northern Africa. Rommel was stopped, however, and the plan was not needed.

In the 1950s, Glueck discovered remains of the advanced Nabataean civilization in Jordan. Using irrigation, the Nabataeans were able to grow crops and develop a densely populated civilization in the Negev desert, despite receiving under 6 inches (15 cm) of rainfall a year. Glueck worked with Israeli leaders to build an irrigation system modeled on that of the Nabataeans.

Glueck's scholarship led to personal relationships with many world leaders: he delivered the benediction at President John F. Kennedy's inauguration in 1961; and he was personal friends with many of the State of Israel's early leaders, including David Ben-Gurion, Abba Eban, Golda Meir, Henrietta Szold and Judah Magnes.

He was the author of several books on archaeology, religion, and the intersection of the two. They include Explorations in Eastern Palestine (4 vol., 1934–51), The Other Side of the Jordan (1940), The River Jordan (1946), Rivers in the Desert: A History of the Negev (1959), Deities and Dolphins (1965), and Hesed in the Bible (1968). Even though he worked to develop a historical understanding of biblical events and argued that the archaeological finds do affirm the biblical descriptions, he always maintained that his faith was not based on a literal interpretation of the Bible. To do that, he once said, would be to "confuse fact with faith, history with holiness, science with religion."

== Awards and commemoration ==
Glueck was an elected member of both the American Philosophical Society (1954) and the American Academy of Arts and Sciences (1966). The Nelson Glueck School of Biblical Archaeology at the Hebrew Union College is named after him.

== See also ==
- Archaeology of Israel
