= Winifred Needler =

Canadian curator (1904-1987)

- Born: Winifred Ellen Needler; June 14, 1904; Weimar, Germany
- Died: September 5, 1987 (aged 83)
- Education: B.A. University College, Toronto; Ontario College of Art (graduated in 1928); School of Fine Arts and Crafts, Boston (1928-1929); M.A. University of Toronto (1961)
- Known for: Egyptologist

Winifred Needler DCL (June 14, 1904 – September 5, 1987) was a German-born Canadian Egyptologist at the Museum of Ontario Archaeology, where she rose to be keeper of the Near Eastern Collections and later curator of the Egyptian Department. She also taught at the University of Toronto.

== Early life and education ==
Winifred Ellen Needler was born in Weimar, Germany, to Mary Winifred (Chisholm) Needler and George Henry Needler, a professor of German at the University of Toronto. She was known to family and friends as 'Friedel' or 'Friedl'. She was educated at St. Margaret's College and Oakwood Collegiate Institute, following which she got her B.A. in modern languages and philosophy at University College, Toronto. She then spent a year studying art at the Ontario College of Art. In 1928 she moved to Boston, Massachusetts, to study at the School of Fine Arts and Crafts, where she won a number of prizes for her artwork.

== Career ==
For five years Needler struggled to make a living as a commercial artist, but this eventually proved impossible during the Great Depression. In 1935, she got a job as a draftsperson and cataloguer at the Museum of Ontario Archaeology, drawing specimens for the museum's card system. She became increasingly interested in the Egyptian collection and began to concentrate on it. In 1938, she was awarded a Carnegie Fellowship that allowed her to take a leave of absence from the museum and study at Yale University. During her year at Yale, she studied with Michael Rostovtzeff, Cornelius Osgood, and Ludlow Bull. She could not stay to complete the two-year master's degree, although Rostovtzeff argued that a paper she wrote for him on Ptolemaic sculpture was so good that it should be accepted as a master's thesis. She received her M.A. in 1961 from the University of Toronto.

On her return to Canada in 1939, Needler undertook a systematic organization and classification of the museum's extensive collection of Near Eastern antiquities, many collected by then-director Charles Trick Currelly. After holding various positions in the museum, in 1951 she was appointed to a top curatorial post as keeper of the Near Eastern Collections. She helped to expand the museum's holdings of artefacts from the Near East. A decade later, when the museum decided to split the Near Eastern Collections in two, she was appointed curator of the half that was named the Egyptian Department.

Needler was able to do field work only intermittently. She spent the summers of 1941 and 1942 in field work at the old mission in Sault Ste. Marie, Ontario. Then in 1947 she had her first chance to do field work in Egypt, joining a team at the temple of Seti I at Abydos, where she worked alongside Amice Calverley to copy wall paintings and inscriptions. In 1956, she spent a month at Jericho, where Kathleen Kenyon was leading the excavations, drawing and recording newfound objects. In 1962–63 she spent time working with Walter Bryan Emery at Buhen in the Sudan and at Qasr Ibrim in Egypt, where archeological salvage work was under way in advance of the construction of Aswan Dam. Needler worked on excavating a cemetery, dismantling a temple built by Queen Hatshepsut, and making drawings of artifacts removed from the sites.

In 1943–44, Needler designed and painted a large frieze for the museum's Egyptian gallery that was 1.1 metres (42 in) wide and extended 25 metres (82 ft) around three walls of the gallery. Populated with some five dozen figures and animals adapted from Egyptian tomb paintings, the mural aimed to capture the spirit and style of Middle Kingdom and New Kingdom art. The mural is no longer on public display but is preserved in the museum's archives.

In 1953, Needler was appointed a special lecturer in the Department of Fine Art at the University of Toronto. After 12 years, she moved over to the Department of Near Eastern Studies as an associate professor and taught there until she retired in 1970.

In 1969, Needler was awarded a prestigious Wilbour Fellowship by the Brooklyn Museum, with the goal of publishing an account of that museum's collection of predynastic and archaic Egyptian art. Needler's research for this monograph occupied the years 1970 (when she retired from the Museum of Ontario Archaeology) to 1975. However, publication was delayed until 1984 because museum publication funds ran low and outside funding had to be secured. Needler's monograph is considered a valuable and original contribution to the study of Egyptian art and archeology.

In 1982, Bishop's University honored Needler with an honorary doctorate in recognition of her service to the Museum of Ontario Archaeology and to the field of Egyptology.

== Publications ==
- Predynastic and Archaic Egypt in the Brooklyn Museum (1984, with C. S. Churcher)
- Jewelry of the Ancient Near East (1966)
- An Egyptian Funerary Bed of the Roman Period in the Royal Ontario Museum (1963)
- Needler, Winifred (1949). "Palestine: Ancient and Modern". Royal Ontario Museum of Archaeology.
