= Midianite pottery =

Type of ancient Middle Eastern pottery

Midianite pottery, also known as Qurayya ware is a type of pottery ware found in the Hejaz (northwestern Saudi Arabia), southern and central Jordan, southern Canaan (in the Arabah and Negev) and the Sinai, that appears in archaeological strata dating from the 13th to 9th centuries BCE.

== Research history ==
Midianite pottery was discovered during the 1930s by Nelson Glueck in his surveys in southern Jordan and his excavations at Tell el-Kheleifeh in the southern Arabah valley. Glueck identified these wares as Iron Age II Edomite pottery.

During his surveys and excavations in the Arabah in the late 1950s and 1960s, Beno Rothenberg found similar decorated wares; and after the discovery at Timna valley of the several Egyptian findings belonging to the 19th and 20th Dynasties, Rothenberg dated this pottery to the 13th-12th centuries BCE. Petrographic studies carried out on some of the Timna wares led to the conclusion that they originated in the Hejaz, most probably in the site of Qurayyah.

Subsequent excavations at various sites in the southern Levant and in Tayma have established that Qurayya ware was produced and in use for a much longer period than initially thought, extending well into the 9th century BCE.

== Description ==
Qurayya pottery consist mostly of tableware, and the bowls bear some resemblance in form with the Iron Age Negevite pottery bowls, who in turn resemble Edomite pottery in their decoration.

While there are undecorated examples, the general group of Midianite ware is characterized by geometric designs and painted decorations in black, brown, red and yellow on a cream slip.
