= Abila (Peraea) =

Archaeological site in Jordan

Coordinates: 31°50′59″N 35°40′43″E

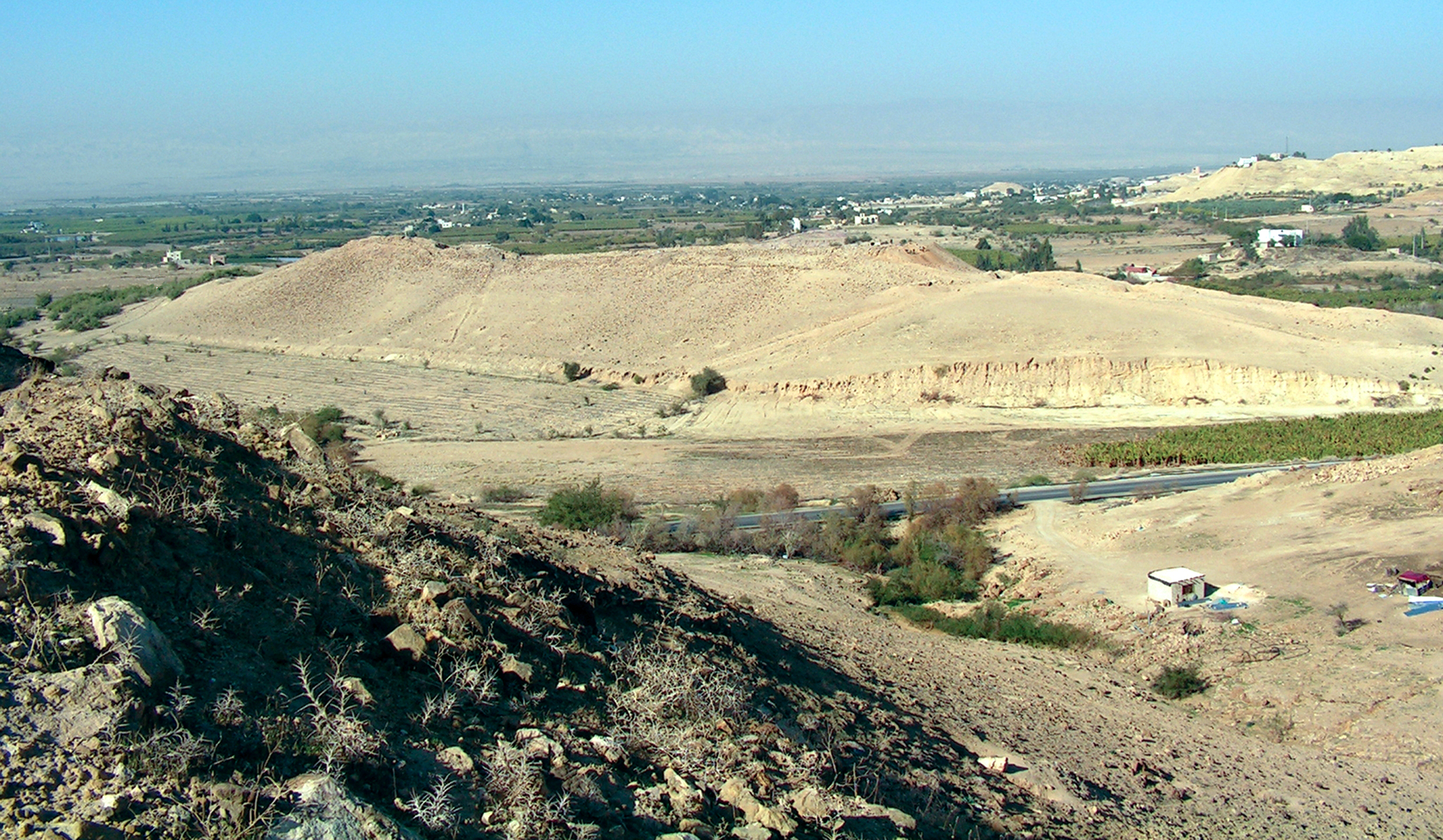
Tall el-Hammam that is identified by most scholars as Abel-Shittim.

Abila (Arabic: ابيلا) was an ancient city east of the Jordan River in the Plains of Moab, later Peraea, near Livias, about twelve km northeast of the north shore of the Dead Sea. The site is identified with modern Khirbet el-Kafrayn, Jordan, and is present on the Madaba Map as an unnamed icon. There is a widely supported theory that in the Hebrew Bible, it is referred to as Abel-Shittim, as well as in the shorter forms Shittim and Ha-Shittim.

== Biblical Abel-Shittim ==
Abel-Shittim, Hebrew meaning "Meadow of the Acacias", is found only in the Book of Numbers (33:49); but Ha-Shittim (Hebrew meaning "The Acacias"), evidently the same place, is mentioned in Numbers, Joshua, and Micah (Numbers 25:1, Joshua 2:1, 3:1, Micah 6:5). It was the forty-second and last encampment of the Israelites, associated with the infamous Baal-peor incident with the Midianites (Numbers 25:1–14). It was also the final headquarters of Joshua before he crossed the Jordan (Joshua 2:1).

The location is transliterated as Shittim in the English Standard Version, Geneva Bible, Jerusalem Bible, King James Version, New International Version and New Revised Standard Version. The Complete Jewish Bible and Orthodox Jewish Bible both translate as Sheetim. The Good News Translation has Acacia Valley and the New King James Version has Acacia Grove. (Note: All translations except Jerusalem Bible are taken from Bible Gateway www.biblegateway.com, accessed 27 June 2015)

The place is mentioned as a-bi-il-šiṭ-ṭi along with Gilead and described as "the border of the land Bīt Ḫumria (Israel)" in the royal annals of Tiglath-Pileser III.

=== Identification ===
Abel-Shittim is identified with the area around Tall el-Hammam, in the Late Bronze Age.

== Josephus' Abila (1st century CE) ==
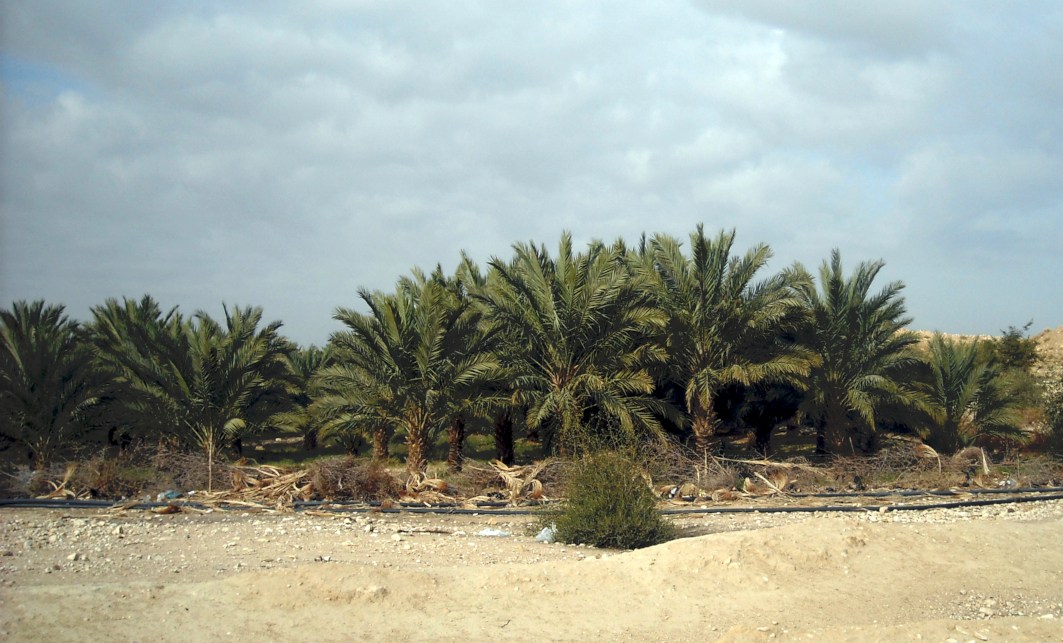
Date palms at the south-west edge of Tall el-Hammam, Jordan

Josephus stated that there was in his time a town, Abila, "full of palm trees", at a distance of sixty stadia (9 kilometres (6 mi)) from the Jordan, and described it as the spot where Moses delivered the exhortations of Deuteronomy. In 1906 there was still an acacia grove not far from the place, although palms as mentioned by Josephus were not to be found.

Pliny commented on how the dates of Livias were of high quality both juicy and sweet. Theodosius also praised the dates of Livias stating "it has there some great Nicolas dates" (ibi habet dactalum Nicolaum maiorem). The Madaba Map also depicts the date palms still growing in the area of Livias-Betharamtha in the sixth century AD.

During the First Jewish-Roman War, Abila was captured by the Roman Imperial army, and was used by them to resettle deserters who had joined the Roman ranks.

=== Identification ===
The archaeological site of Tell el-Hammam near Abila is identified by some as Livias. Date palms still grow at the edge of Tell el-Hammam.

== See also ==
- Plains of Moab

== Bibliography ==
- Graves, David E.; Stripling, Scott (2007). "Identification of Tall El-Hammam on the Madaba Map". Bible and Spade. 20 (2): 35–45.
- Josephus, Antiquities of the Jews, iv.8, § 1; v.1, § 1 (see here at Perseus Project).
- Josephus, De Bello Judaico (The Jewish War) (4.437) (see 4.7.6 at Perseus Project).
- Harrison, R. K. (1983). Edward M. Blaiklock (ed.). Shittim. Grand Rapids, MI: Zondervan. p. 413.
- MacDonald, Burton (2000). Victor H. Matthews (ed.). East of the Jordan: Territories and Sites of the Hebrew Scriptures. ASOR Books. Vol. 6. Boston, MA: American Schools of Oriental Research (ASOR). p. 90.
- Miller, J. Maxwell; Tucker, Gene M. (1974). The Book of Joshua. The Cambridge Bible Commentary on the New English Bible. Cambridge, Mass.: Cambridge University Press. p. 199. ISBN 0521097770.
- Glueck, Nelson (1943). "Some Ancient Towns in the Plains of Moab". Bulletin of the American Schools of Oriental Research (91): 7–26 (see 15, 21).
- Glueck, Nelson (1951). "Explorations in Eastern Palestine". Annual of the American Schools of Oriental Research (AASOR) 25–28. IV part 1. New Haven, CT: ASOR.
- Thomson, William M. (1886). The Land and the Book: Lebanon, Damascus, and Beyond Jordan. New York, NY: Harper & Brothers. p. 3:669.
