= Bethharan =

Bethharan, Betharan or Beth Haran (for Hebrew: בית הרן), also Betharam or Beth-Aram (for Hebrew בית הרם; no linguistic relation to Aram), was a Hebrew Bible city, in the valley-plain east of the Jordan River, opposite Jericho. In the Book of Joshua, a city called "Betharam" is listed as one of the cities allotted by Moses to Gad (Joshua 13:27), previously belonging to Sihon the Amorite. According to the Book of Numbers, "Betharan" was rebuilt by the tribe of Gad (Numbers 32:36).

== Classical-period city ==
In classical antiquity, the town, now known as Betharamatha (בית רמתה, Ancient Greek: Βηθαραμφθᾶ), was situated along the road connecting Jericho to Philadelphia. Herod the Great constructed royal palaces at this location.

In the 1st century AD, Herod Antipas, tetrarch of Galilee and Perea and son of Herod, fortified the site and renamed it Livias in honor of Livia, wife of Roman Emperor Augustus. As she was later called Julia, the 1st-century Jewish historian Josephus speaks of the city as Julias. The town's royal palaces were burned by rebels during the Varus war in 4 BCE.

Having been burnt during the fall of Jerusalem in AD 70, it was later restored by Christians and served as a bishopric.

== Identification ==
The Catholic Encyclopedia of 1913 stated that the site used to be "identified by some with Tell er-Rameh, six miles east of the Jordan, by others with Beit Harran" (the latter seems to be a mistranscription of the 1913 article)..

The team recently excavating Tell el-Hammam identifies both biblical Bethharan and classical Livias with their own excavation site.
