= Nimrin (disambiguation) =

Nimrin was a Palestinian Arab town depopulated by Israel during the 1948 Arab-Israeli War.

Nimrin may also refer to:

- Beth-Nimrah, Nimrin or Bethennabris, ancient city in Transjordan
- Shunet Nimrin, former populated place in the Jordan Valley by Wadi Nimrin
- Tell Nimrin, archaeological site in Jordan
- Wadi Nimrin, left tributary of the Jordan River

== See also ==
- Nimrim
