= Trinity Southwest University =

Coordinates: 35.16600°N 106.5913°W

- Established: 1990; 36 years ago
- Affiliations: The Association of Christian Schools International
- Executive Dean: Steven Collins
- Location: Albuquerque, New Mexico, United States
- Website: trinitysouthwest.com

Trinity Southwest University (TSU) is an evangelical Christian institution of higher education with an office in Albuquerque, New Mexico. Principally a theological school that encompasses both the Bible college and theological seminary concepts of Christian education, it offers distance education programs and degrees in biblical studies, theological studies, archaeology and biblical history, biblical counseling, biblical representational research, and university studies.

== History ==
TSU was founded as Southwest Biblical Seminary in Tulsa, Oklahoma, where it provided Bible-oriented education for local students. In 1989 it relocated to Albuquerque, New Mexico. According to TSU, in 1990 it began an official association with "an internationally-known Bible college and seminary" (not identified), but it became an independent institution of higher education in 2001.

Most TSU students enroll in distance education. As of 2007 the typical student was an adult between 40 and 49 years old. At that time, the school occupied a former church in Albuquerque. As of October 2021 its location was described as "a strip mall in Albuquerque."

== Doctrine ==
TSU is evangelical Christian in its orientation; it calls itself "trans-denominational". The school holds that biblical scripture, specifically "the ancient Hebrew Tanakh and the New Testament", is "the only written, divinely inspired representation of reality given by God to humankind, speaking with absolute and authority in all matters upon which it touches."

== Affiliations and accreditation status ==
TSU is not accredited by any accreditor recognized by the United States Department of Education. The institution's position is that "any governmental association or oversight ... is inappropriate for a faith-based organization or institution, and constitutes a fundamental violation of church/state separation". It currently operates in New Mexico under a religious exemption authorized by state law. TSU is a member of the Association of Christian Schools International.

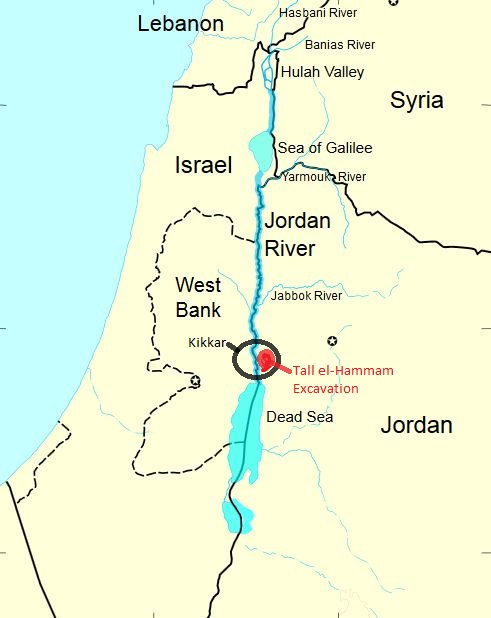
Tall el-Hammam Excavation Project map in the area of Eastern Kikkar in the Jordan Valley of Jordan

== Archaeology ==
Since 2005, TSU's executive dean Steven Collins has directed excavations at Tall el-Hammam in Jordan, a Bronze Age settlement which he argues was the biblical city of Sodom. He has written several books on the topic. Other biblical archaeologists have rejected the identification because it is inconsistent with biblical literalist chronology; according to Christianity Today, "few archaeologists outside of those working on the excavation team believe that Tall el-Hammam is Sodom."

Collins and his colleagues believe that Tall el-Hammam was destroyed in a sudden catastrophe, based on the discovery of burnt brick, melted pottery and geophysical signatures of high temperatures. In a 2021 paper, they argued that this was a meteor air burst similar to the Tunguska event. Soon after its publication, physicist Mark Boslough, who is cited in the paper, raised several concerns about its contents and the background of its authors, and Elisabeth Bik, an expert in investigating scientific misconduct, identified possible doctored images. The authors initially denied tampering with the photos but eventually published a correction in which they admitted to inappropriate image manipulation. In April 2025, the paper was retracted citing "errors in methodology, analyses, and interpretation".
