= List of rivers of Jordan =

This is a list of rivers in Jordan. This list is arranged by drainage basin, with respective tributaries indented under each larger stream's name. Many of these rivers are seasonal.

== Dead Sea ==
Rivers and streams flowing into the Dead Sea:

=== Jordan River with affluents ===
The Jordan River is the major river flowing into the Dead Sea from the north. It also is the northern part of the western border of Jordan. Its affluents are listed from north to south.

- Jordan River
  - Yarmouk River - largest tributary of the Jordan and forms part of the northern border of Jordan with Syria and Israel. Flows into the Jordan just south of the Sea of Galilee
  - Wadi al-'Arab
  - Wadi Ziqlab
- Wadi al-Yabis (biblical Chorath)
  - Wadi Kafranja or Kufrinjah, passing near Ajloun
  - Zarqa River (biblical Jabbok) - second largest tributary of the Jordan, flows in about halfway between the Sea of Galilee and the Dead Sea
    - Wadi Zulayl or Dhuleil
  - Wadi Shu'ayb or Sha'eb
  - Wadi al Gharabah
    - Wadi ar-Ramah
    - Wadi al Kafrayn
      - Wadi as-Seer ("Valley of the Orchards" near Amman)

=== Dead Sea direct affluents ===
Rivers and streams that flow directly into the Dead Sea are:

- Wadi Zarqa Ma'in (Wadi Zarqa' Ma'in, Wadi Zarqa-Ma'in)
- Wadi Mujib (biblical Arnon)
  - Wadi al-Haydan
  - Wadi an-Nukhaylah
  - Wadi al-Hafirah
- Wadi ash-Shuqayq
- Wadi al-Karak
- Wadi Arabah (Wadi al-Jayb) - the valley to the south of the Dead Sea and also the southern border with Israel
  - Wadi al-Hasa (biblical Zered)
  - Wadi al-Fidan
  - Wadi al-Buwayridah
  - Wadi Musa, passing through the same-name town and ancient Petra

== Red Sea (Gulf of Aqaba) ==
Streams flowing into the Red Sea's Gulf of Aqaba:

- Wadi Yitm
  - Wadi Rum

== Syrian Desert ==
Wadis in the Jordanian part of the Syrian Desert:

- Wadi Sirhan
  - Far Wadi al-Abyad
  - Wadi Fakk Abu Thiran
  - Wadi al-Fukuk
  - Wadi al-Hasah
  - Wadi al-Gharra
  - Wadi Ba'ir
  - Wadi al Makhruq
  - Wadi al Jashshah al Adlah
  - Wadi Rijlat
  - Wadi al Ghadaf
  - Wadi al Janab

=== Qa al-Jafr ===
A "qa" is a mudflat.

- Wadi Abu Safah
  - Wadi al-Buraykah
- Wadi Abu Tarafah
- Wadi Abu 'Amud
- Wadi al-Jahdaniyah
- Wadi Kabid
- Wadi al-'Unab
