= Wadi Shuʿeib (archaeological site) =

Neolithic archaeological site in Jordan

Wadi Shuʿeib is a Neolithic archaeological site in Wadi Shuʿeib, Jordan. Considered a "mega-site", it consists of the remains of large village occupied through the Pre-Pottery Neolithic B and Late Neolithic periods.
