= Amathus, Transjordan =

Ancient city in the Jordan Valley

Coordinates: 32.1856°N 35.6867°E

Amathus (Ancient Greek: Ἀμαθοῦς or τὰ Ἀμαθά; in Eusebius, Ἀμμαθοὺς. Hebrew: עמתו was a fortified city east of the Jordan River, in modern-day Jordan.

== Location ==
Its ruins may be those of Tell Ammata in the Jordan Valley or perhaps of Tell Hammeh. Both sites are in Jordan, west of Gerasa and south of Pella. The first is at the mouth of Wadi Rajib, and the second - a little south, on the mouth of Jabbok river. Tell Mghanni up the Jabbok, and Tell el-Hammam near the Dead Sea, have also been suggested.

== History ==
At the beginning of the 1st century BC, Amathus was an important fortress held by Theodorus, son of the tyrant Zeno Kotoulas of Philadelphia. In about 100 BC, Alexander Jannaeus captured but could not retain it, and therefore, a few years later, he razed it. It was possibly the seat of one of the five districts into which Aulus Gabinius divided Palestine a few decades later.

Amathus was part of the Herodian kingdom and then of Judaea Province of the Roman Empire from 44 AD. From 135 to about 390, Amathus belonged to the province of Syria Palaestina, formed after the defeat of the Bar Kokhba Revolt, by a merge of Roman Syria and Judaea. In about 390, it became part of the newly created province of Palaestina Prima, whose capital was Caesarea Maritima.

== Episcipal See ==
The names of four ancient bishops of Amathus are known. Theodosius took part if the Robber Council of Ephesus in 449. Sergius is mentioned in the Life of Saint Saba by Cyril of Scythopolis and may have lived around the year 500. In 518, Procopius signed the letter of the bishops of Palestine to Patriarch John II of Constantinople against Severus of Antioch. Dorotheus signed the acts of the synod of 538 attended by the bishops of all three Roman provinces of Palaestina Prima, Palaestina Secunda, and Palaestina Salutaris.

Amathus in Palaestina is listed by the Catholic Church as a titular see.
