= Livias =

Classical city in TransJordan

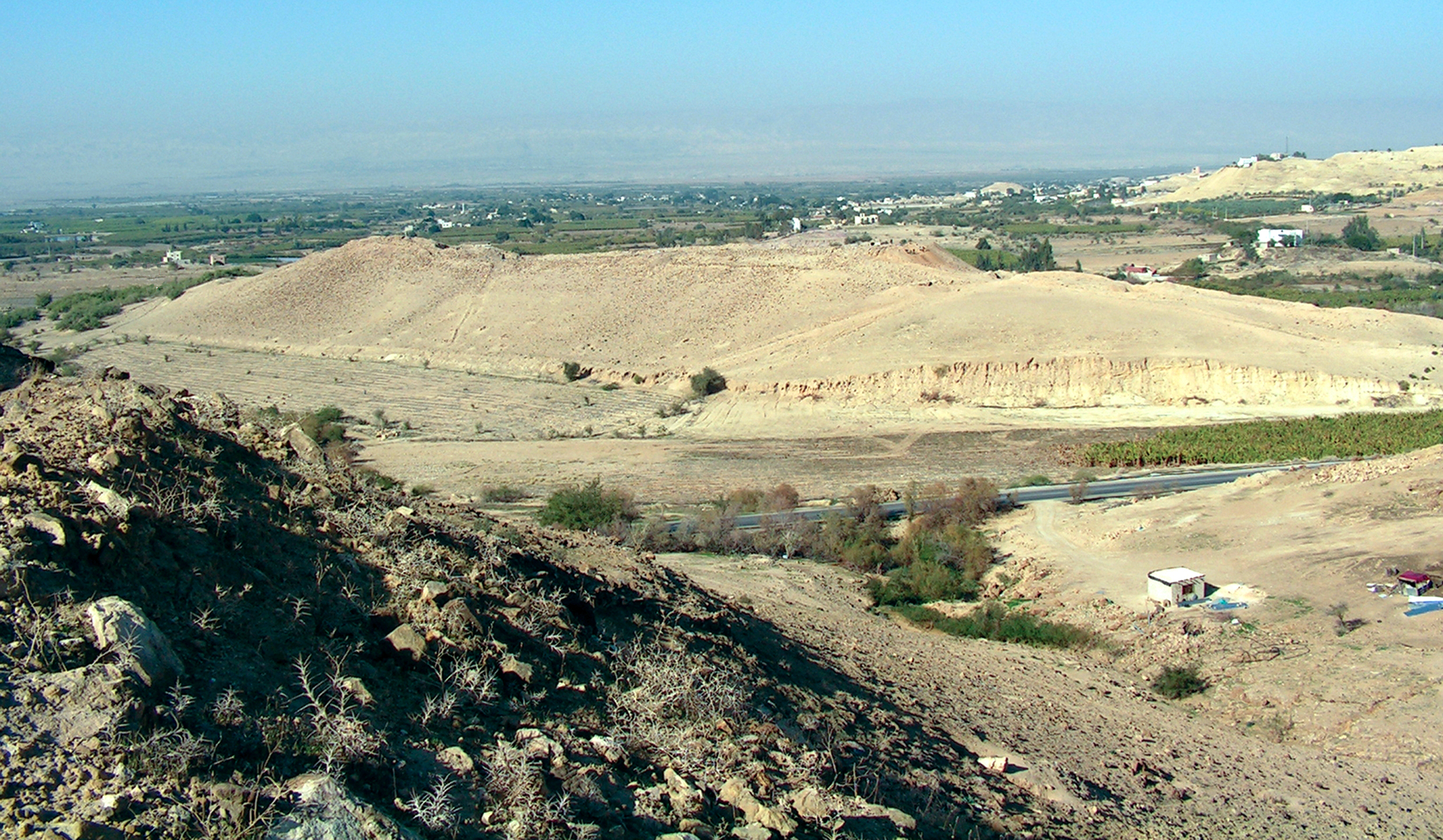
The site of Tall el-Hammam

Livias was a city in Transjordan in Classical Antiquity. In the writings of Josephus (English translation), the name is presented as Julias.

Numerous authors have presented a chain of evidence connecting Beth-Haram from the Book of Joshua (Josh. 13:27), considered to be the same as Bethharan from Numbers (Num. 32:36), with Talmudic Beit Ramata (Hebrew: בית רמתה) and Roman-period Betharamtha (Βηθαραμθα) or Betharamphtha.

== Location ==
The traditional location of the Roman city is at Tell er-Rameh, a small hill rising in the plain beyond Jordan, about twelve miles from Jericho.

In 2011 Graves and Stripling proposed that, while Tell er-Rameh was the commercial and residential center of Livias, the area around Tell el-Hammam, which grew in the Early Roman period, was the administrative epicenter of the city. This suggestion is based on the evidence from Tell el-Hammam excavations: a large Roman bath complex (thermae, 35x50m), several hot springs, aqueduct, Roman coins, Roman glass, Roman pottery, and a Byzantine church mosaic nearby.

Archaeological evidence from Shuneh el-Janubiyyeh has shown the existence of a church in the diocese, dating from the sixth-eighth centuries. A third Byzantine church was discovered between Tall Kafrayn and Tell el-Hammam (2.6 km or 1.6 mi west of the latter), with a large mosaic floor, now being used as a Muslim cemetery.

Josephus (AD 37–c. 100) and others describe Livias as a city (πόλις polis) of Perea, and specifically differentiate it from a small town (πόλίχνη polichnē) or from its surrounding fourteen villages (κώμας kōmas).

A directional reference is the fifth milestone north of Livias located at Bethnambris (Bethnamaris; Bethnamran) or Tall Nimrin (TMP 749034E, 3532378N). According to Eusebius' Onomasticon, Livias is five Roman miles (7.5 km/ 4.7 m) south of Tall Nimrin.

These directional references, together with a statement provided by Theodosius that "the city of Livias is across the Jordan, twelve [Roman] miles [17.75 km/ 11 m] from Jericho" (Wilkinson) to the east, provide east/west and north–south co-ordinates that when triangulated place Livias at Tall el-Hammam.

== History ==
The city of Betharan is twice mentioned in the Bible (Numbers 32:36; Joshua 13:27).

At about 80 BC, Hasmonean king Alexander Jannaeus captured a city later called by his son "Libias" from the Nabataeans; it was then called Betharamphtha (Hebrew: בית רמתה). According Josephus, in the 1st century AD, Herod Antipas, Tetrarch of Galilee and Perea, fortified the city of "Betharamphtha" with strong walls and called it Julias after the wife of Augustus, whose birth name was Livia Drusilla, but who became known as Julia Augusta after adoption. Nero gave it with its fourteen villages to Agrippa II. In the First Jewish-Roman War the Roman general Placidus captured it in 68, and the town was used to resettle deserters who had joined the Roman ranks. After the revolt was quelled, the area was returned to Agrippa. He died without heir, and his territories were annexed to Judaea province. In later reorganizations of Roman provinces, it was included in Syria Palaestina (135), Palaestina (286) and Palaestina Prima (425), never gaining a colonia status.

In the time of Eusebius and St. Jerome the natives still called it Bethramtha.

=== Bishopric ===
Livias was an episcopal see, a suffragan of the diocese Caesarea in Palaestina. Le Quien mentions three bishops:

- Letoius, who was at the Council of Ephesus in 431;
- Pancratius, at the Council of Chalcedon in 451;
- Zacharias, at a synod called by Patriarch Menas of Constantinople in 536.

No longer a residential bishopric, Livias is today listed by the Catholic Church as a titular see.

== Bibliography ==
- Graves, David E.; Stripling, Scott (2011). "Re-Examination of the Location for the Ancient City of Livias". Levant. 43 (2): 178–200. doi:10.1179/175638011X13112549593122. S2CID 162399714.
- Josephus (1895) [1737]. The Works of Flavius Josephus. Translated by William Whiston. Auburn and Buffalo, NY: John E. Beardsley – via Perseus Project.
  - Antiquities (see at Perseus)
  - Wars (see at Perseus)
- Piccirillo, Michele. "The Christian Sanctuaries in Transjordan, part 07". Franciscan Archaeological Institute. Archived from the original on 2012-02-24.
