= Tell er-Rameh =

Archaeological site in Jordan

- Tell/Tall el/er-Ramah/Rameh/Rama
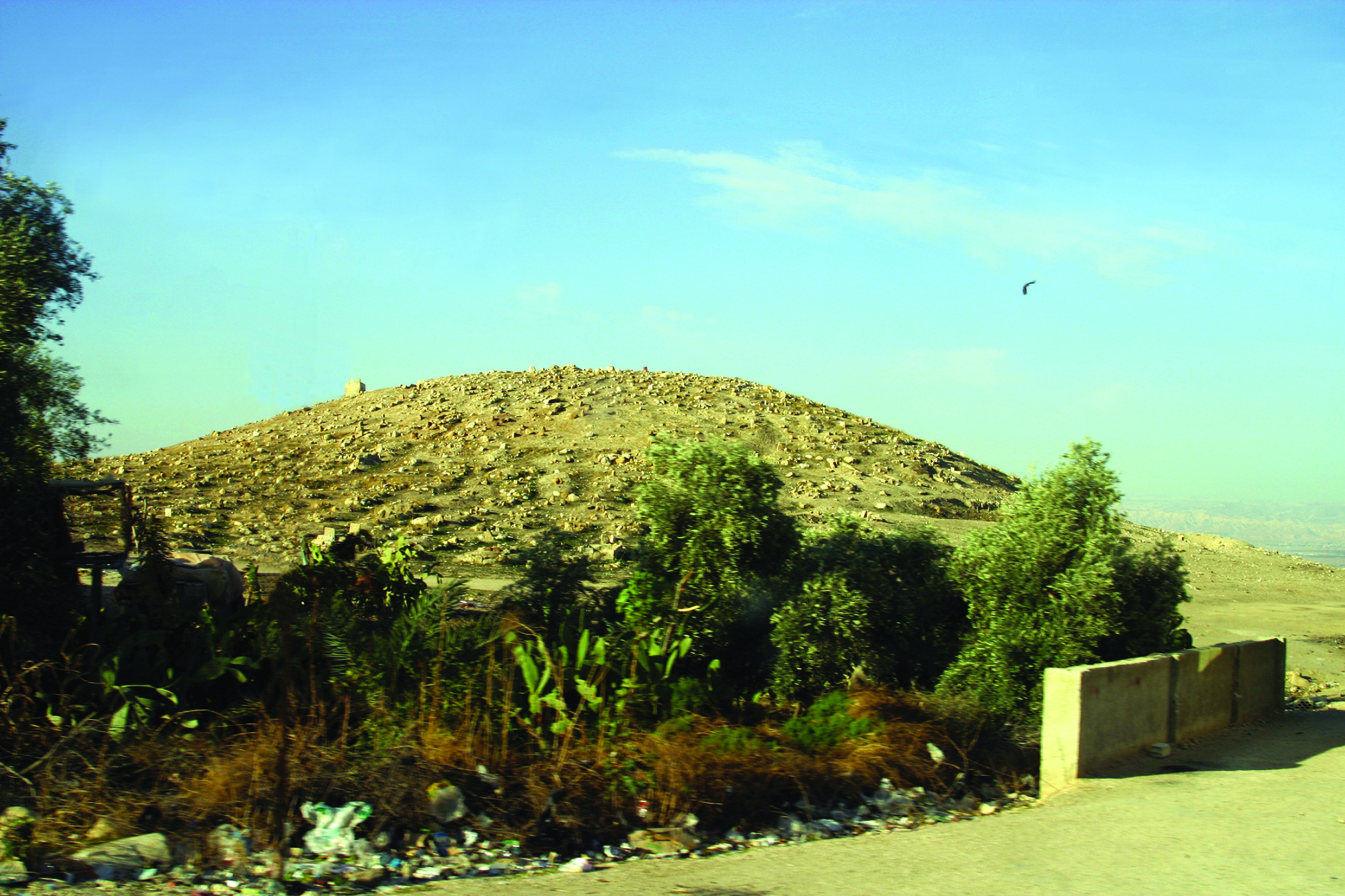
- Tell er-Rameh

- Location within Jordan
- 31°49′32″N 35°38′40″E
- Cultures: Roman Age, Byzantine, Umayyad
- Location: Jordan
- Region: Amman Governorate

Tell er-Rameh or Tall el-Rama is a small mound in Jordan rising in the plain east of the River Jordan, about twelve miles (19 km) from Jericho. It presently has a Muslim cemetery on the acropolis that prevents it from being excavated. It has been traditionally identified as the location of Livias. The team recently excavating at Tell el-Hammam however, has proposed that Tell er-Rameh was the commercial and residential centre of Livias, while the administrative centre was located at Tall el-Hammam.

== Etymology ==
According to Vailhé and Abel the modern name er-Rameh may have derived from the ancient names of Βηθαραμφθά (Betharamphtha), which is what Josephus indicates was the name for Livias Dvorjetski believes that the modern name er-Rameh is derived from Wadi er-Rameh.

== Identification ==
Regarding the name evolution from biblical Beth-haram through the Roman-period Livias/Julias to Arabic Tell er-Rameh, Nelson Glueck states that:

"the equation of Beth-haram, Beth-ramtha, Beit er-Ram, Beit Ramah, Tell er-Rameh with Livias (Julias), ... is undoubtedly correct. It does not prove, however, that Tell er-Rameh is to be identified with the actual site of ancient Biblical Beth-haram.... An examination of the pottery of Tell er-Rameh proves that this identification cannot possibly be correct."

Graves & Stripling propose that, while Tell er-Rameh was the commercial and residential centre of Livias, the administrative centre was situated at nearby Tall el-Hammam. Tell er-Rameh had no natural water source, and some have argued that it received its water from the hot springs at Tall el-Hammam. Dvorjetski identified Tell er-Rameh with Livias based on the presence of "pottery or mosaic stone cubes from the Byzantine and early Islamic eras."

== See also ==
- Plains of Moab
