= Plains of Moab =

Biblical region, today in Jordan

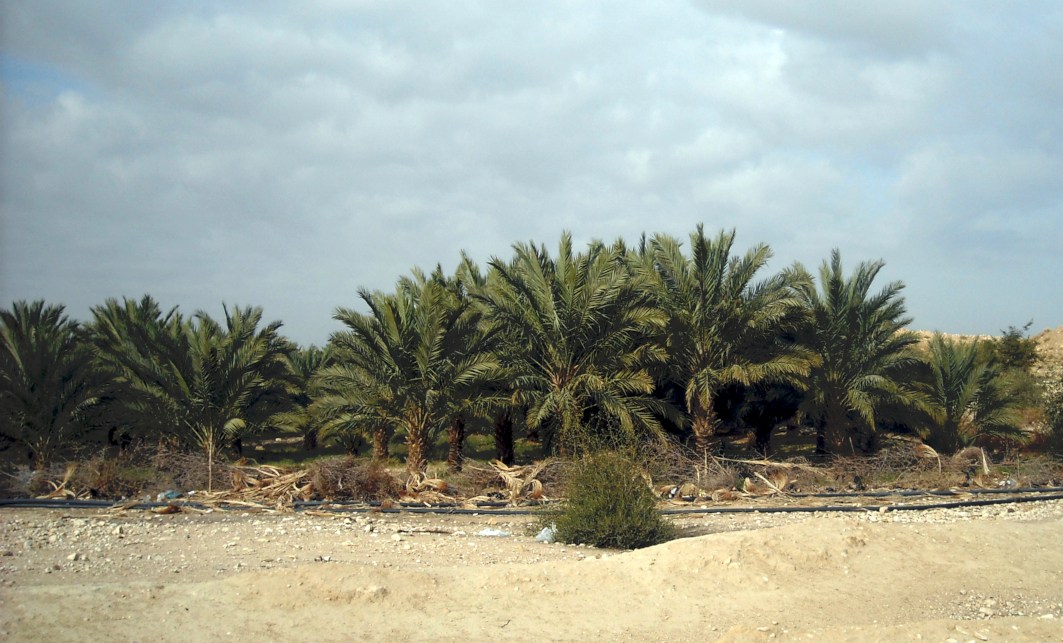
Date palms near Tell el-Hammam, identified by many scholars as Abel-Shittim of the Plains of Moab

The Plains of Moab (Hebrew: עַרְבוֹת מוֹאָב, romanized: Arboth Mo'av, lit. 'Dry areas of Moab') are mentioned in three books of the Hebrew Bible (Numbers, Deuteronomy and Joshua) as an area in Transjordan, stretching along the Jordan "across from Jericho", and more specifically "from Beth Jeshimoth to Abel Shittim" (Num. 33:49). Here is the last Station of the Exodus and the place from which Moses climbs up on Mount Nebo "to the top of Pisgah", where he dies (Deut. 34:1).

== Geography ==
Nelson Glueck describes the Plains of Moab as having the shape of a "truncated harp", with its northern limit marked by Wadi Nimrin, and the southern tip created by the Moab hills south of Wadi el-'Azeimeh, which stretch out from the Moab Plateau toward the NE end of the Dead Sea, closing off the Plains. Glueck names the three main streams crossing the Plains toward the Jordan as, from north to south, Wadi Nimrin, which before emerging from the hills is called Wadi Sha'ib; Wadi el-Kefrein; and Wadi er-Ramah, called Wadi Hesban in the hills, which merges with Wadi el-Kefrein two-thirds of the way across the Plains.

In his 1856 book The Sacred Plains J.H. Headley described the Plains of Moab as having a wider extent: "The Plains of Moab lie east of the Dead Sea and River Jordan. The Arnon, running through its midst, divides them into two parts. A low range of mountains, called Abarim, extending from the southern part of the Dead Sea to Mount Gilead, again subdivides them east and west. On the east they extend to the borders of the Great Desert, into which they gradually sink; and on the West, form a succession of elevated terraces, like gigantic steps, down to the shores of Jordan and Dead Sea. <...> In ancient times the Moabites had possessed the whole plains from the southern part of the Dead Sea to Mount Gilead; but the Amorites had warred against them, and wrestled all that portion lying north of the River Arnon from them..."

== Persian period ==
In the 4th century BC, Israelites returning from the Babylonian exile settled the ancient site of Beth-nimrah, this city marking the easternmost point of Jewish settlement in Transjordan.

== See also ==
- Map: Portion of Eastern Palestine surveyed in the 1870s by the Palestine Exploration Fund (PEF)

== Bibliography ==
- Glueck, Nelson (October 1943). "Some Ancient Towns in the Plains of Moab". Bulletin of the American Schools of Oriental Research (91): 10. doi:10.2307/3219054. JSTOR 3219054.
