= Burton MacDonald =

Canadian archaeologist (1939–2022)

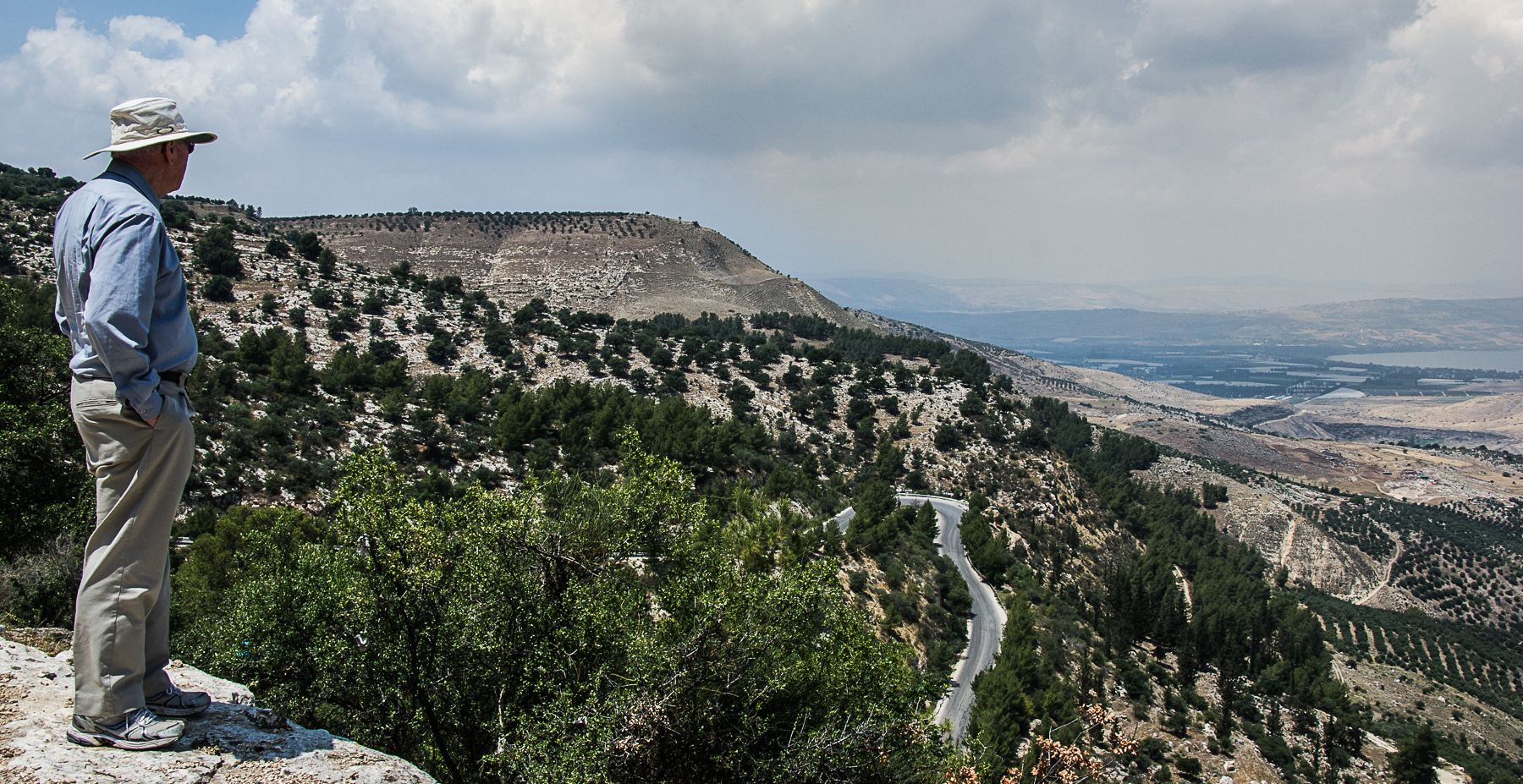
MacDonald surveying the landscape of Jordan

Burton MacDonald (September 13, 1939 – October 20, 2022) was a Canadian biblical archaeologist specialising in the archaeology of Jordan. He was a professor at St. Francis Xavier University from 1965 to 2005, then a Senior Research Professor, and was made Professor Emeritus in the Religious Studies department in 2017.

== Early life and education ==
MacDonald was born in Témiscamingue, Quebec, and attended St. Francis Xavier University (St. F. X.) and graduated with a BA in philosophy in 1960. He then began studies at St. Paul's Seminary, part of the University of Ottawa, where he obtained a baccalaureate in theology in 1962, a licentiate in theology in 1964, and a masters in religious education in 1965. After working as a priest and two years teaching at Xavier College (now Cape Breton University) and St. F. X., he enrolled in the Department of Near Eastern Languages and Literature at the Catholic University of America (CUA), where he obtained a PhD in 1974 with a dissertation on the biblical Tribe of Benjamin. In 1968, he was elected a member of the Catholic Biblical Association. He also studied at the École Biblique et Archéologique Française in Jerusalem between 1969 and 1971.

== Academic career ==
MacDonald returned to St. F. X. in 1972 as a professor in the Department of Theology (later the Department of Religious Studies). He became a full professor in 1989 and served as the chair of the department between 1992 and 1995 and 1996 to 2000. He held the Father Edo Gatto Chair of Christian Studies in 2006.

MacDonald first became involved in archaeological fieldwork whilst studying at the École Biblique, including the sites of Gezer (1970) and Tell el-Hesi (1971) in Israel. He then joined excavations led by G. Ernest Wright at Idalion, Cyprus (1971). After further work at Idalion (1974) and Tell el-Hesi (1975), he was introduced to the archaeology of Jordan as a member of the Expedition to the Dead Sea Plain, directed by Walter E. Rast and R. Thomas Schaub (1977) and the Central Moab Survey, directed by J. Maxwell Miller (1979). He also participated in the University of Toronto's The Wadi Tumilat Project, East Nile Delta, Tell al Maskhuta, Egypt, under the directorship of John S. Holladay (1978–1979).

MacDonald directed five major field projects, focusing on the Edomite plateau in southern Jordan:

- The Wadi el-Hasa Archaeological Survey (1979-1983)
- The Southern Ghors and Northeast `Arabah Archaeological Survey (1985-1986)
- The Tafila-Busayra Archaeological Survey (1999-2001)
- The Ayl to Ras an-Naqb Archaeological Survey (2005-2007)
- The Shammakh to Ayl Archaeological Survey (2010-2012)

== Death ==
Burton MacDonald died from acute myeloid leukemia in Halifax, on October 20, 2022, at the age of 83.

== Awards ==
- Research Award, St. Francis Xavier University (2000)
- G. Ernest Wright Publications Award, American Schools of Oriental Research (2005)
- Hall of Honour, St. Francis Xavier University (2010)

A festschrift of collected essays in honour of MacDonald, Walking through Jordan: Essays in Honor of Burton MacDonald, was published in 2017.

== Selected publications ==
- MacDonald, B.; Banning, E. B.; Clark, G. A., Majchrowicz, D. and Coinman, N. R.; Coinman, N., Clark, G. A. and Lindly, J.; Donahue, J. and Beynon, D. E., Harlan, J. R.; Betlyon, J.; King, G.; and Piccirillo, M. (1988), The Wadi el-Hasa Archaeological Survey 1979-1983, West-Central Jordan. Wildrid Laurier University ISBN 0-88920-965-0
- MacDonald, B.; `Amr, K.; Broeder, N. H.; Skinner, H. C. W.; Meyer, C.; Neeley, M. P.; Reese, D. S.; and Whitcomb, D. S. (1992), The Southern Ghors and Northeast `Arabah Archaeological Survey. Sheffield Archaeological Monographs 5. J. R. Collis, Department of Archaeology and History, University of Sheffield ISBN 0-906090-43-1
- MacDonald, B. (1994), Ammon, Moab and Edom: Early States/Nations of Jordan in the Biblical Period (End of the 2nd and During the 1st Millennium B.C.). Al Kutba OCLC 32430317
- MacDonald, B., and Younker, R. (eds.) (1999), Ancient Ammon. Brill ISSN 0169-9024
- MacDonald, B. (2000), "East of the Jordan": Territories and Sites of the Hebrew Scriptures. American Schools of Oriental Research ISBN 0-89757-031-6
- MacDonald, B.; Adams, R. B.; and Bienkowski, P. (eds.) (2001), The Archaeology of Jordan. Levantine Archaeology 1. Sheffield Academic ISBN 1-84127-136-5
- MacDonald, B.; Herr, L. G.; Neeley, M. P.; Gagos, T.; Moumani, K.; and Rockman, M. (2004), The Tafila-Busayra Archaeological Survey 1999-2001, West-Central Jordan. Archaeological Reports 8. American Schools of Oriental Research ISBN 0-89757-066-9
- MacDonald, B. (2010), Pilgrimage in Early Christian Jordan: A Literary and Archaeological Guide. Oxbow ISBN 978-0-9774094-9-5
- MacDonald, B.; Herr, L. G.; Quaintance, D. S.; Clark, G. A.; and Macdonald, M. C. A. (2012), The Ayl to Ras an-Naqab Archaeological Survey, Southern Jordan (2005-2007). Archaeological Reports 16. American Schools of Oriental Research ISBN 978-0-89757-085-5
- MacDonald, B. (2015), The Southern Transjordan Edomite Plateau and the Dead Sea Rift Valley: The Bronze Age to the Islamic Period (3800/3700 BC-AD 1917). Oxbow ISBN 978-1-78297-832-9
- MacDonald, B.; Herr, L. G.; Quaintance, D. S.; Clark, G. A.; Hayajneh, H.; and Eggler, J. (2016), The Shammakh to Ayl Archaeological Survey, Southern Jordan (2010-2012). Archaeological Reports 24. American Schools of Oriental Research ISBN 978-0-89757-093-0
- Neeley, M. P.; Clark, G. A.; and Daviau, P. M. M. (eds.) (2017), Walking through Jordan: Essays in Honor of Burton MacDonald. Equinox ISBN 9781781792834
