= Perea =

Portion of the Herodian kingdom

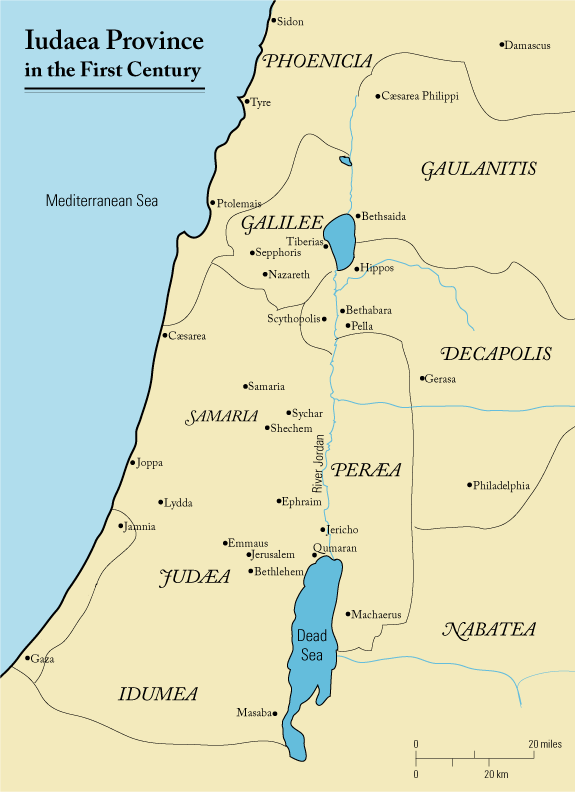
Perea and its surroundings in the 1st century CE

Incorporation into Arabia Petraea 106–630 CE

Perea or Peraea (Greek: Περαία, "the country beyond") was the term used mainly during the early Roman period for part of ancient Transjordan. It lay broadly east of Judea and Samaria, which were situated on the western side of the Jordan River, and southwest of the Decapolis.

Perea was part of the kingdom of Herod the Great and his descendants, and later of subsequent Roman provinces that included Iudaea.

== Name ==
The name Perea originated in the Late Hellenistic period as a Greek translation of the Hebrew word 'beyond' (Hebrew: עבר). The Greek term pera, meaning "beyond," was used to describe this region from the perspective of observers in Judea.

== Geography ==
Perea was a slender piece of land east of the Jordan River. It stretched from Wadi Yabis in the north to Wadi Mujib (Nahal Arnon) in the south. The region extended from the Jordan River westwards to the foothills eastward towards Amman (then known as Philadelphia). Josephus notes that Perea's northern boundary was near Pella, while to the east, it bordered the territories of Gerasa and Philadelphia (both part of the Decapolis) and Heshbon. To the south, it was adjacent to the Land of Moab, with Machaerus marking its southernmost fortress.

Encompassing roughly 2,625 square kilometers, Josephus was accurate in stating that Perea surpassed Galilee in size, as Galilee spanned approximately 2,200 square kilometers. Josephus depicted Perea mainly as "desert" and "rugged," with pockets of well-cultivated areas, a feature now undergoing transformation due to extensive irrigation initiatives.

== History ==
The territory of what would at one point in history become known as Peraea or Perea was part of Trans-Jordan, which in the Hellenistic period changed hands between the states of the heirs of Alexander the Great, the Nabataean Arabs, and the Jewish Hasmoneans.

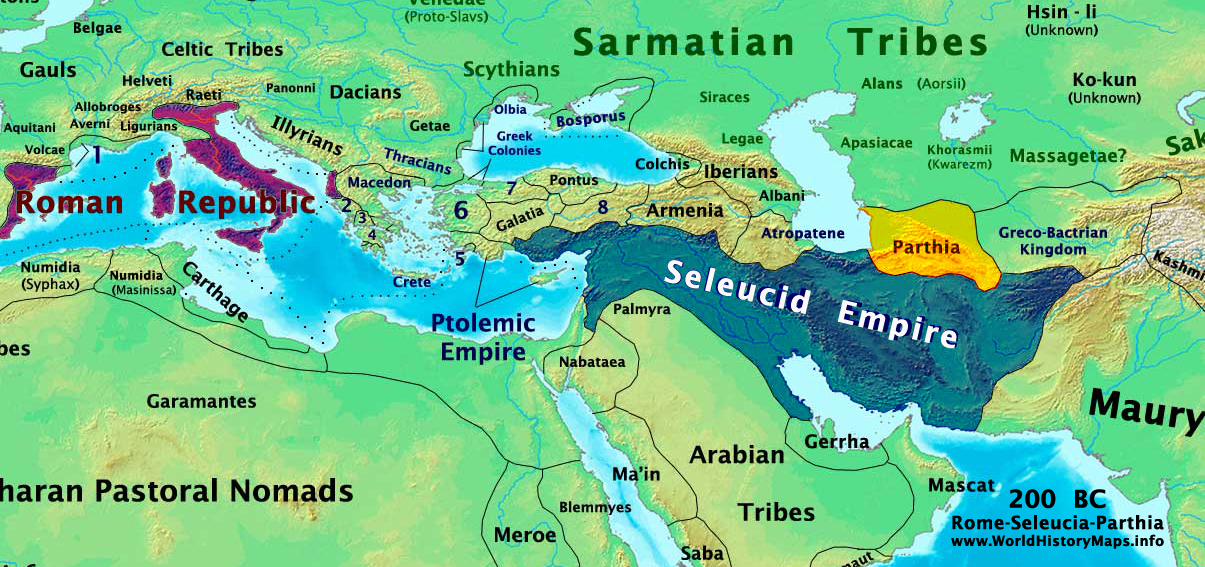
Incorporation into Seleucid Kingdom 200 BCE

Perea was the portion of the kingdom of Herod the Great occupying the eastern side of the Jordan River valley, from a point about one third the way down the lower Jordan River (i.e. the segment connecting the Sea of Galilee with the Dead Sea), to a point about one third down the eastern shore of the Dead Sea; it did not extend very far to the east. Herod the Great's kingdom was bequeathed to four heirs, of which Herod Antipas received both Perea and Galilee. He dedicated the city of Livias in the north of the Dead Sea to the wife of Augustus, Julia Augusta, born Livia Drusilla. In 39 CE, Perea and Galilee were transferred from disfavoured Antipas to Agrippa I by Caligula. With his death in 44 CE, Agrippa's merged territory was made a province again, including Judaea and for the first time, Perea. From that time Perea was part of the shifting Roman provinces to its west: Judaea, and later Syria Palaestina, Palaestina and Palaestina Prima. Attested mostly in Josephus' books, the term was in rarer use in the late Roman period. It appears in Eusebius' Greek language geographical work, Onomasticon, but in the Latin translation by Jerome, Transjordan is used.

=== Gadara/Gadora in Peraea ===
Gadara or Gadora of Perea (identified as Tell Jadur near Al-Salt) was the chief city or metropolis of Perea (a Jewish city, not to be confused with Gadara of the Decapolis−a Hellenistic city). Following the Roman conquest of Judea led by Pompey in 63 BCE, Aulus Gabinius, proconsul of Syria, split the former Hasmonean kingdom into five districts of legal and religious councils known as synedria (in Jewish context better known as sanhedrins) and based at Jerusalem, Jericho, Sepphoris (Galilee), Amathus (Perea) and Gadara (either in Perea at Al-Salt, in the Decapolis at Umm Qais, or at biblical Gezer in Judea, mentioned by Josephus under a Hellenised form of its Semitic name, Gadara, edited to "Gazara" in the Loeb edition).

=== During the Jewish–Roman wars ===
Josephus's works indicate that the Jews of Perea took part in the First Jewish–Roman War (66–73 CE), though the limited warfare in the area suggests that the Jews of this district were far less involved in the fighting than their brethren in Judaea and the Galilee. Accordingly, Jewish presence in Perea continued into the following period, as reflected in Talmudic references to Jews living there between the two revolts, as well as in an inscription from the Judaean Desert that records a bridegroom named Joshua son of Menachem from the village of Soffathe in the district of Livias.

During the Bar Kokhba revolt (132–136 CE), however, the Jewish settlements of Perea appear to have been drawn into the conflict with the Romans and destroyed or abandoned in its course. Evidence for this includes a destruction layer from the early decades of the second century uncovered at Tel Abu al-Sarbut in the Jordan Valley, and hoards abandoned at Callirhoe and at al-Mukhayyat. Additionally, a papyrus dated to 151 CE from Caesarea mentions a discharged Roman soldier residing in the Peraean settlement of Meason, indicating the process of Roman resettlement on lands confiscated from the local Jewish population. Finally, an inscription of the Sixth Legion from As-Salt may likewise indicate a Roman military presence there after the destruction of the Jewish population during the revolt. In the aftermath, during the later Roman and Byzantine periods, no further Jewish presence is attested in the region.

== Pliny the Elder and Josephus ==
- c. 78 CE Pliny the Elder in his work, Naturalis Historia, Book 5(15) wrote;

['Greater Judea' or 'Provincia Iudaea', incorporates Samaria and Idumea into an expanded territory.] The part of Judaea adjoining Syria is called Galilee, and that next to Arabia and Egypt Peraea. Peraea is covered with rugged mountains, and is separated from the other parts of Judaea by the river Jordan (in the original Latin: "Supra Idumaeam et Samariam Iudaea longe lateque funditur. Pars eius Syriae iuncta Galilaea vocatur, Arabiae vero et Aegypto proxima Peraea, asperis dispersa montibus et a ceteris Iudaeis Iordane amne discreta.")

- c. 75 CE Josephus in his work, The Jewish War, Book 3(3) wrote;

Peraea ...much larger indeed [than Galilee], is generally desert and rugged, and too wild for the growth of delicate fruits. In some parts, however the soil is loamy and prolific, and trees of various kinds cover the plains ; but the olive-tree, the vine, and the palm tree, are those principally cultivated. It is also sufficiently irrigated by mountain streams ; and (should these in the dog-days fail) by ever flowing springs. In length, it extends from Machaerus to Pella : in breadth, from Philadelphia to the Jordan : its northern districts being bounded, as we have already said, by Pella ; and those on the west, by the river. The land of Moab forms its southern limit ; while Arabia and Silbonitis, with Philadelphia and Gerasa, constitute its eastern boundary.

== Other authors ==
Ptolemy does not use the term Perea in his Geography, but rather the periphrasis "across the Jordan". And he enumerates the "Perean" cities; Cosmas, Libias, Callirhoe, Gazorus, Epicaeros in this district.

== In the Bible ==
According to the Hebrew Bible, the Transjordan region was home to the Israelite tribes Reuben, Gad, and the half tribe of Manasseh. The original text does not use the word "Perea", but rather a Hebrew term (Hebrew: עבר הירדן, romanized: ʿever hayyarden, lit. 'beyond the Jordan'). In some cases, the Tanakh uses the related term Gilead, which usually refers only to the northern part of the Transjordan, to refer to all the region east of the Jordan River.

New Testament commentators speak of Jesus' Perean Ministry, beginning with his departure from Galilee (Matthew 19:1; Mark 10:1) and ending with the anointing by Mary in Bethany (Matthew 26:6) or his journey towards Jerusalem commencing from Mark 10:32.

== Perea in Iran ==
The Christian Armenians who were deported from Armenia and forcibly settled in the New Julfa/Isfahan region of Iran named a major village "Perea" in honor of the important significance of Perea as the resting place of John the Baptist.

== Hasmonean incorporation ==
- Hasmonean dynasty
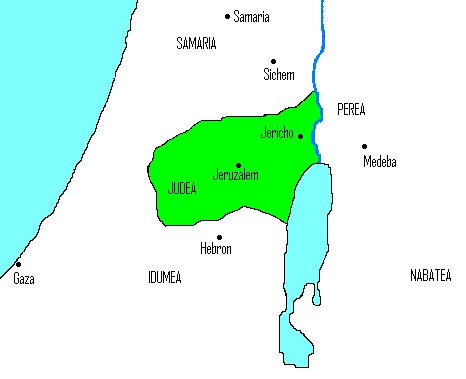
Hasmonean Kingdom established in 167-160 BCE under Judas Maccabeus

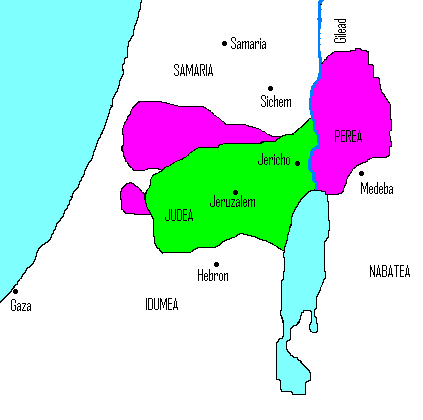
Hasmonean Kingdom in 161-143 BCE under Jonathan Apphus (after conquest of Perea)

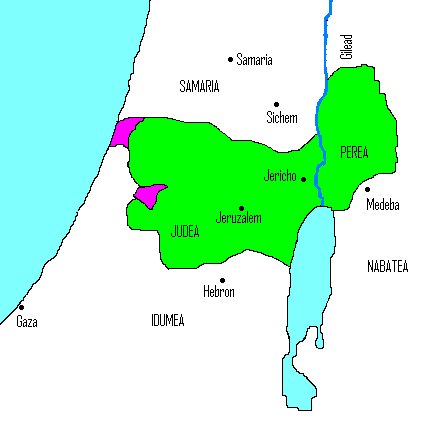
Hasmonean Kingdom in 142-135 BCE under Simon Thassi

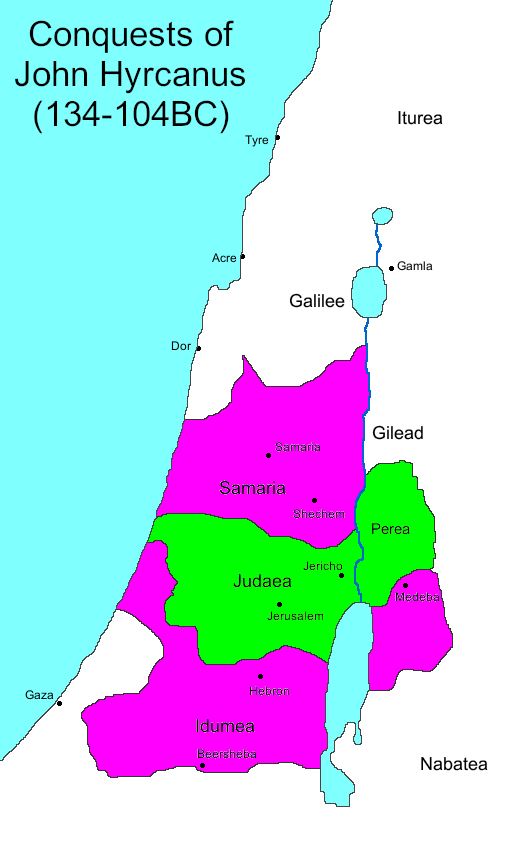
Hasmonean Kingdom in 134-104 BCE under John Hyrcanus (after conquest of Samaria and Idumea)

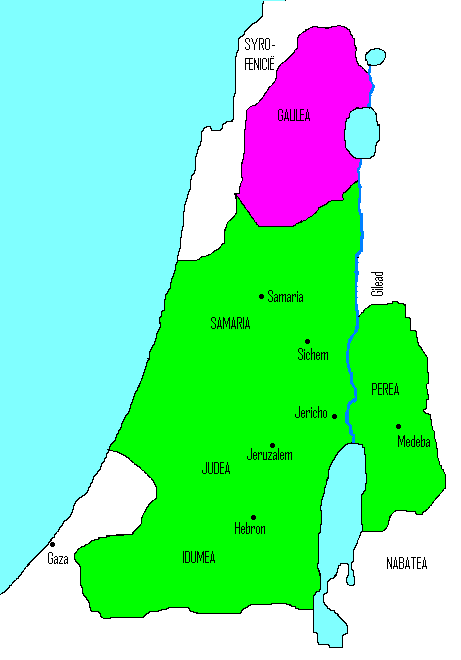
Hasmonean Kingdom in 104-103 BCE under Aristobulus I (after conquest of Galilee)

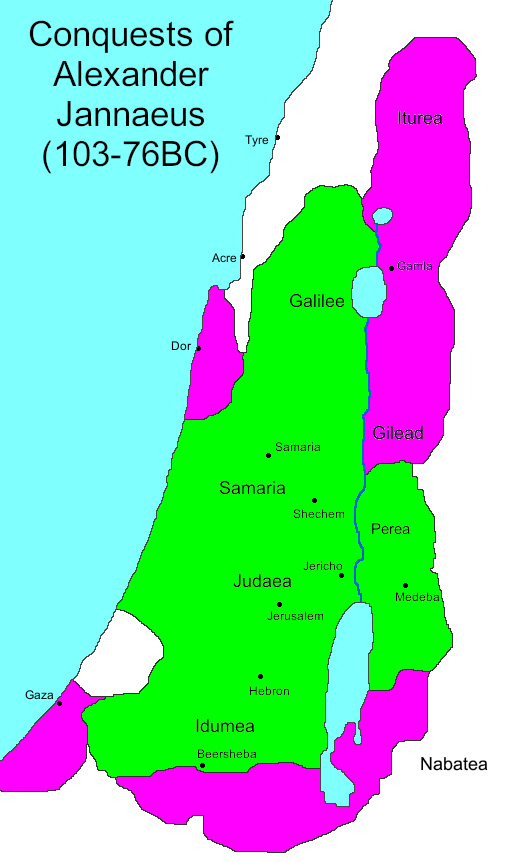
Hasmonean Kingdom in 103-76 BCE under Alexander Jannaeus (after conquest of Iturea)

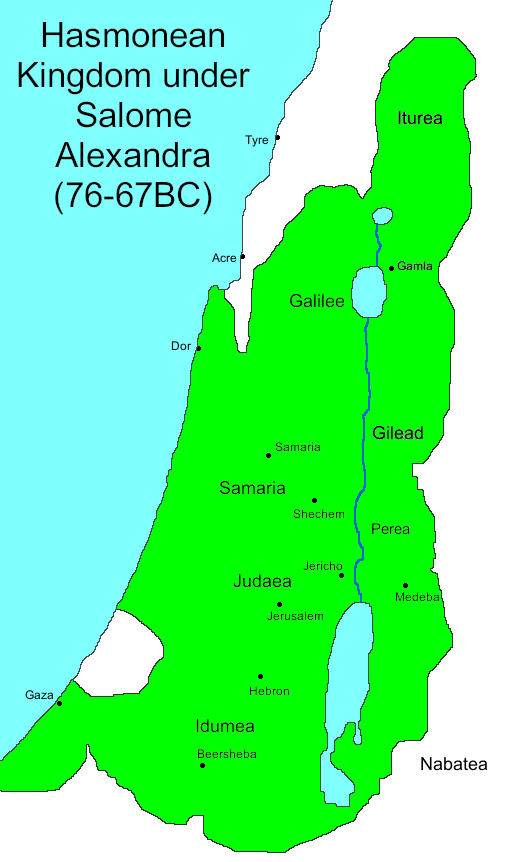
Hasmonean Kingdom in 76-67 BCE under Salome Alexandra

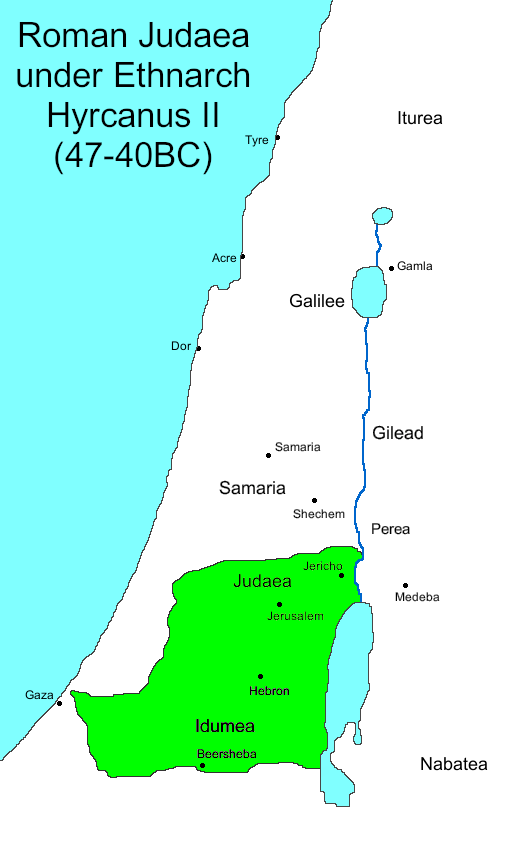
Hasmonean Kingdom collapse in 67-66 BCE under Hyrcanus II

== Herodian incorporation ==
- The Herodian kingdom of Judaea
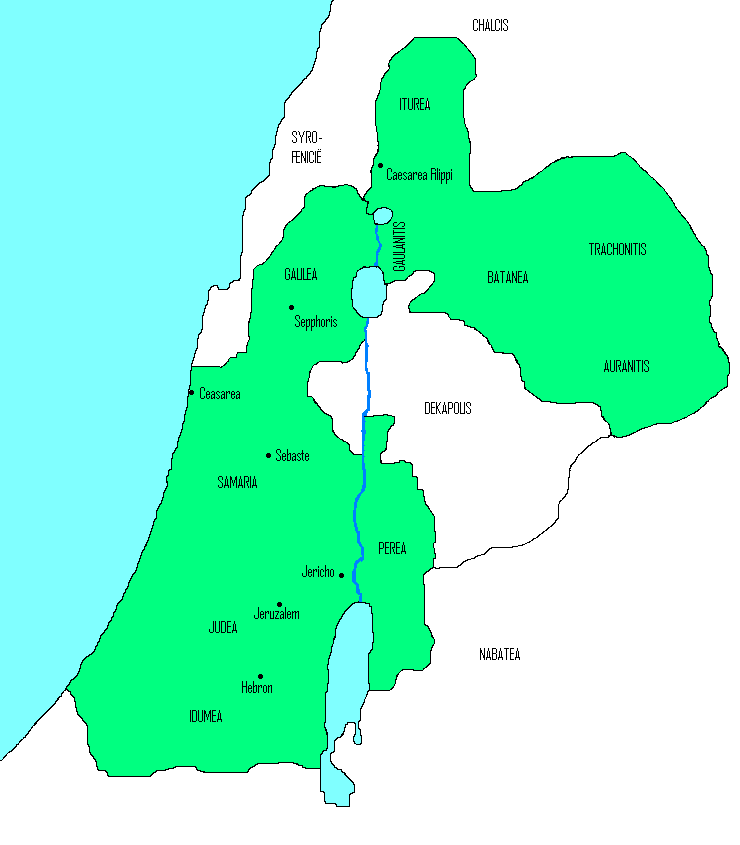

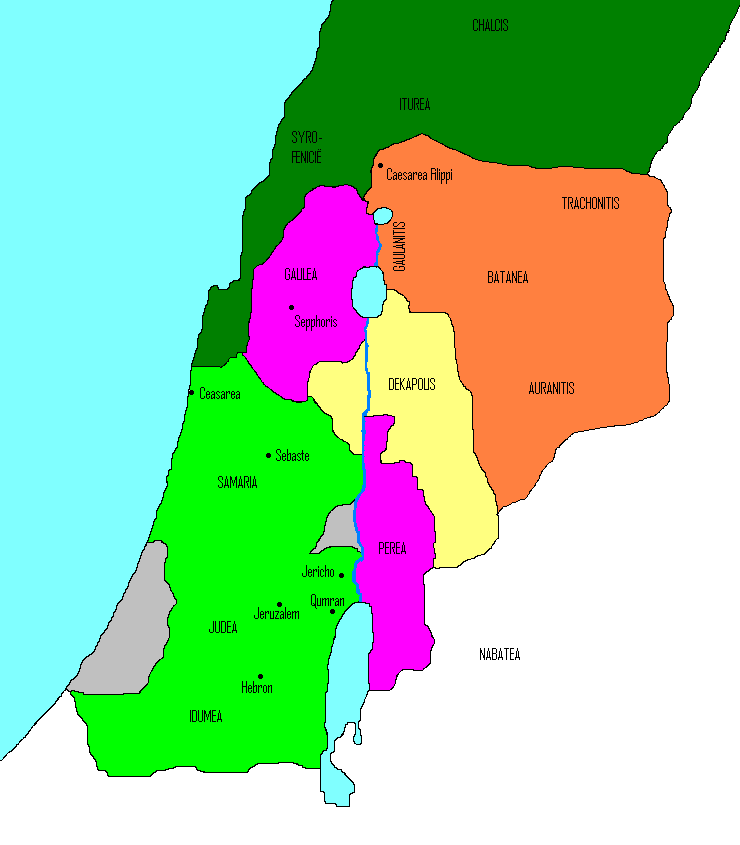
Herod's kingdom was divided between his sons

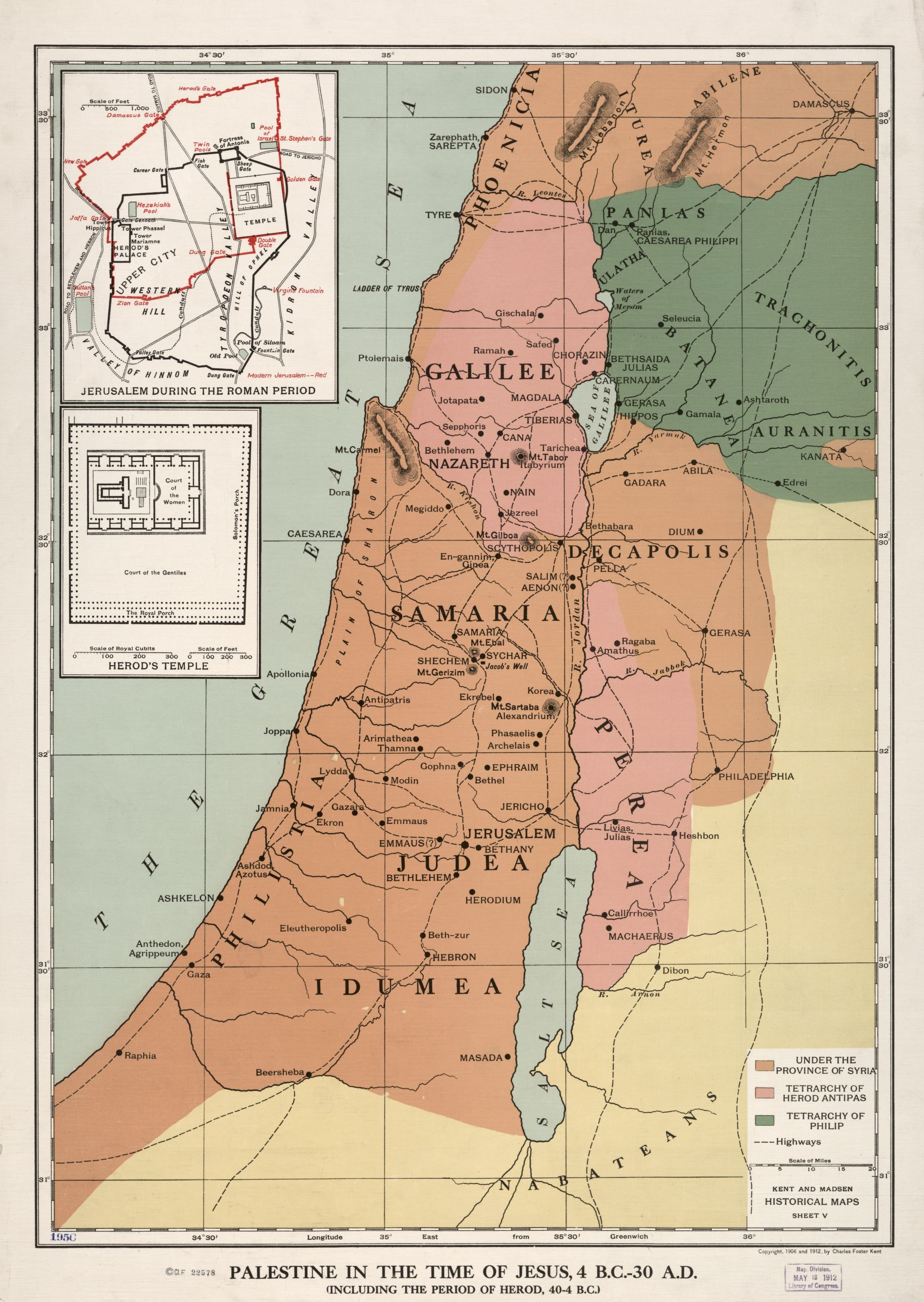

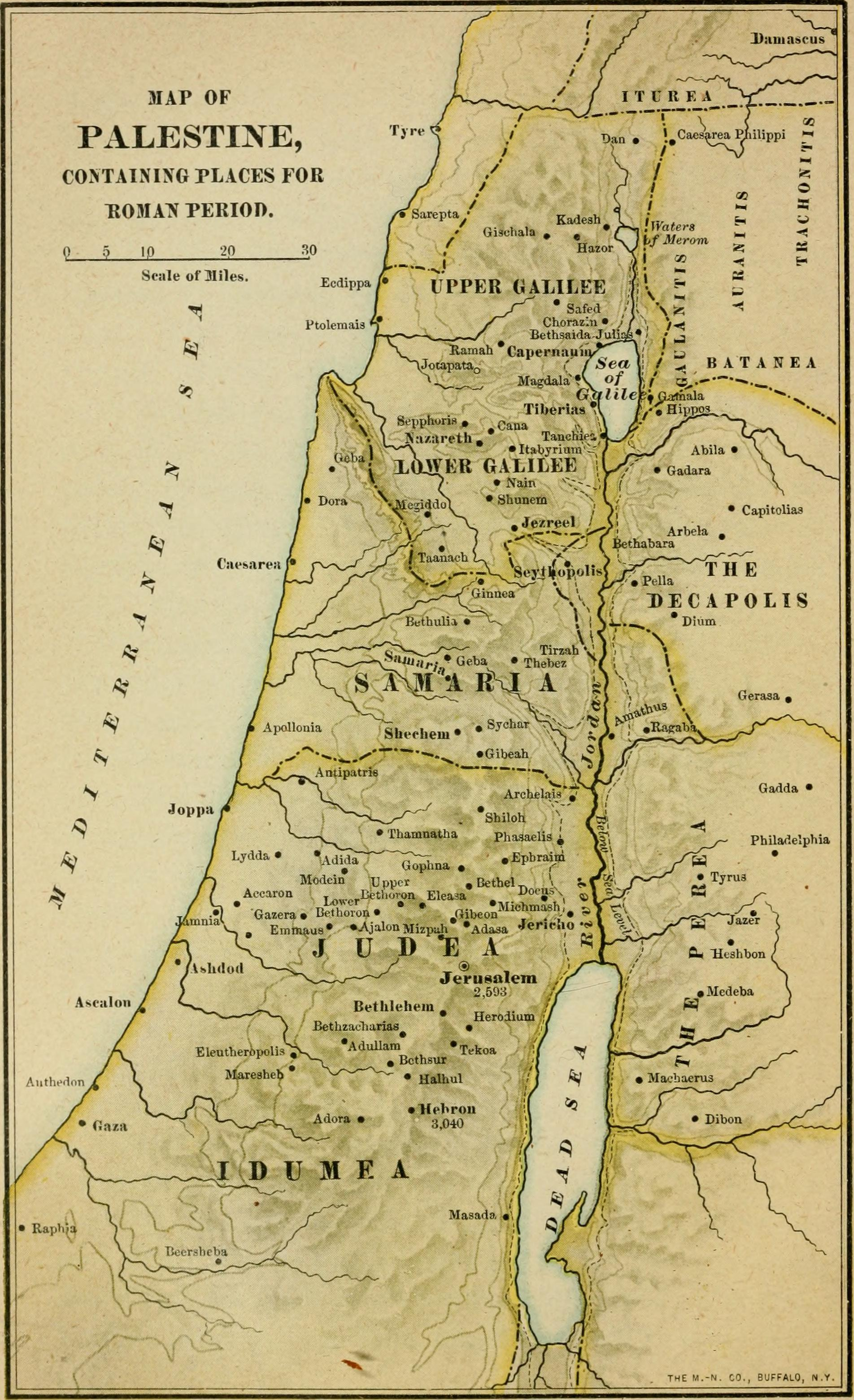

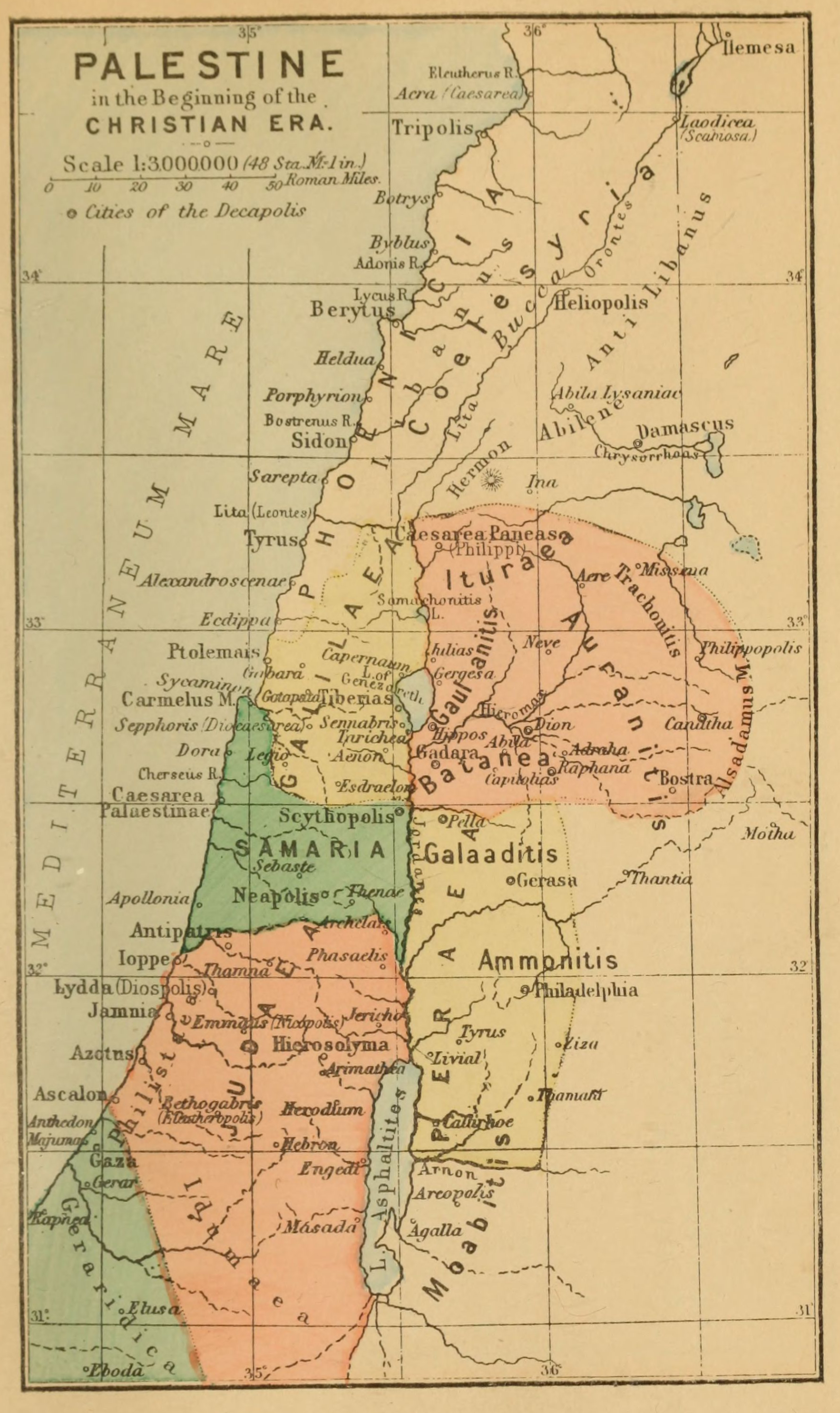

== Later incorporation ==
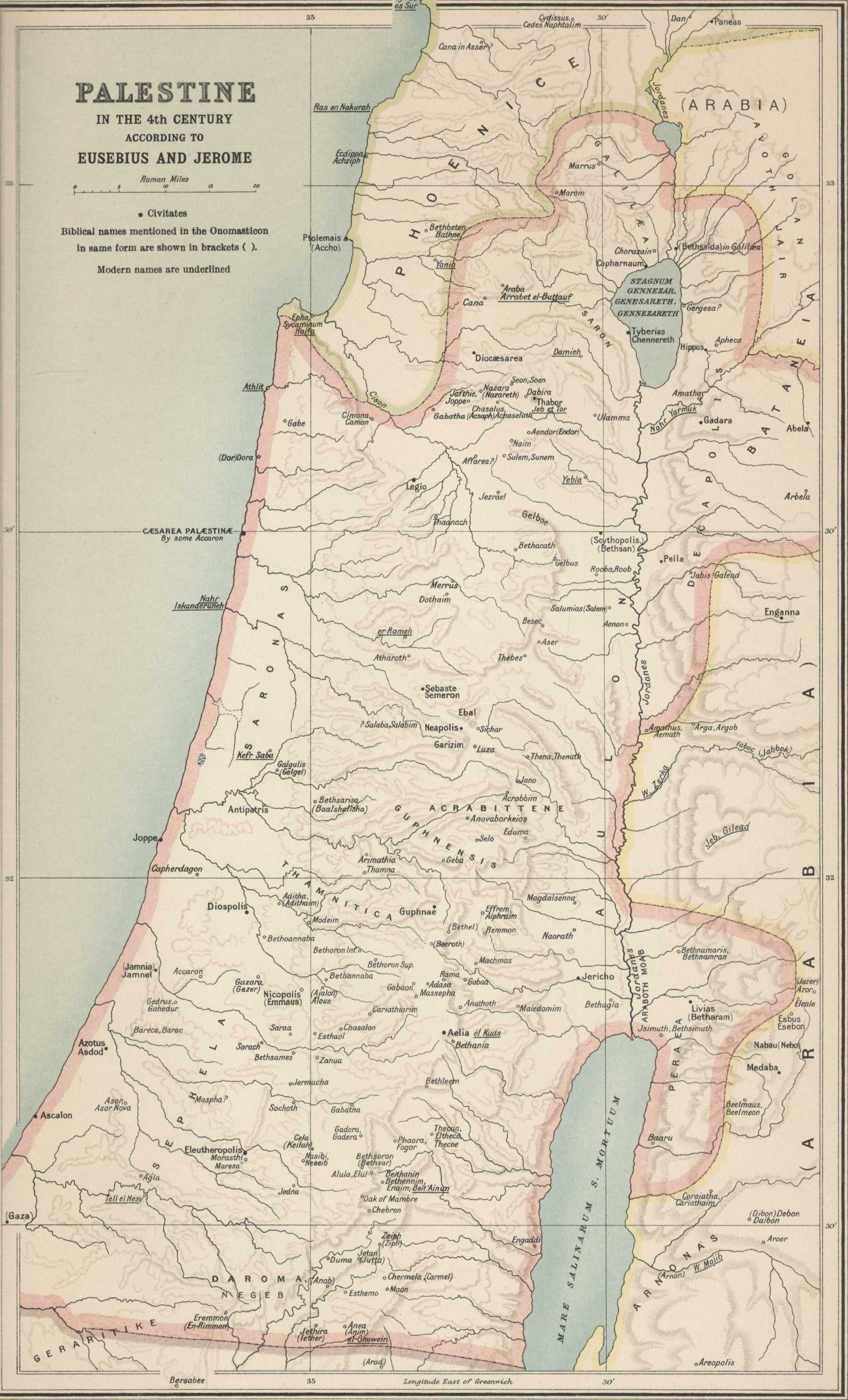
Perea in c.350 CE according to Eusebius and Jerome (map as reconstructed by George Adam Smith, 1915).

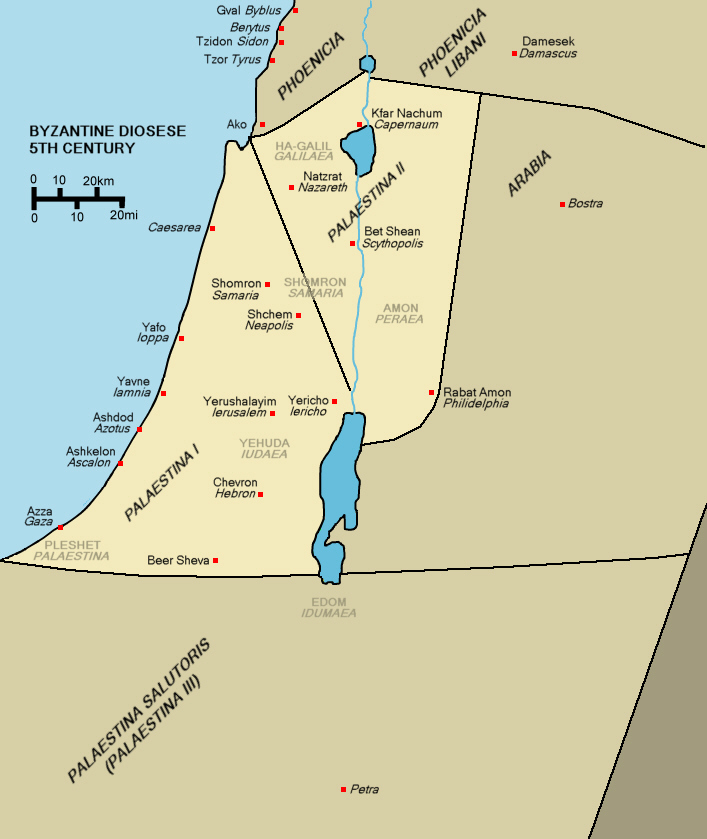

== See also ==
- Transjordan (Bible)
- Transjordan (region)
- Gilead
- Amathus
- Livias
- Machaerus
