= Beth Nimrah =

Ancient city in Transjordan

Coordinates: 31.909°N 35.638°E

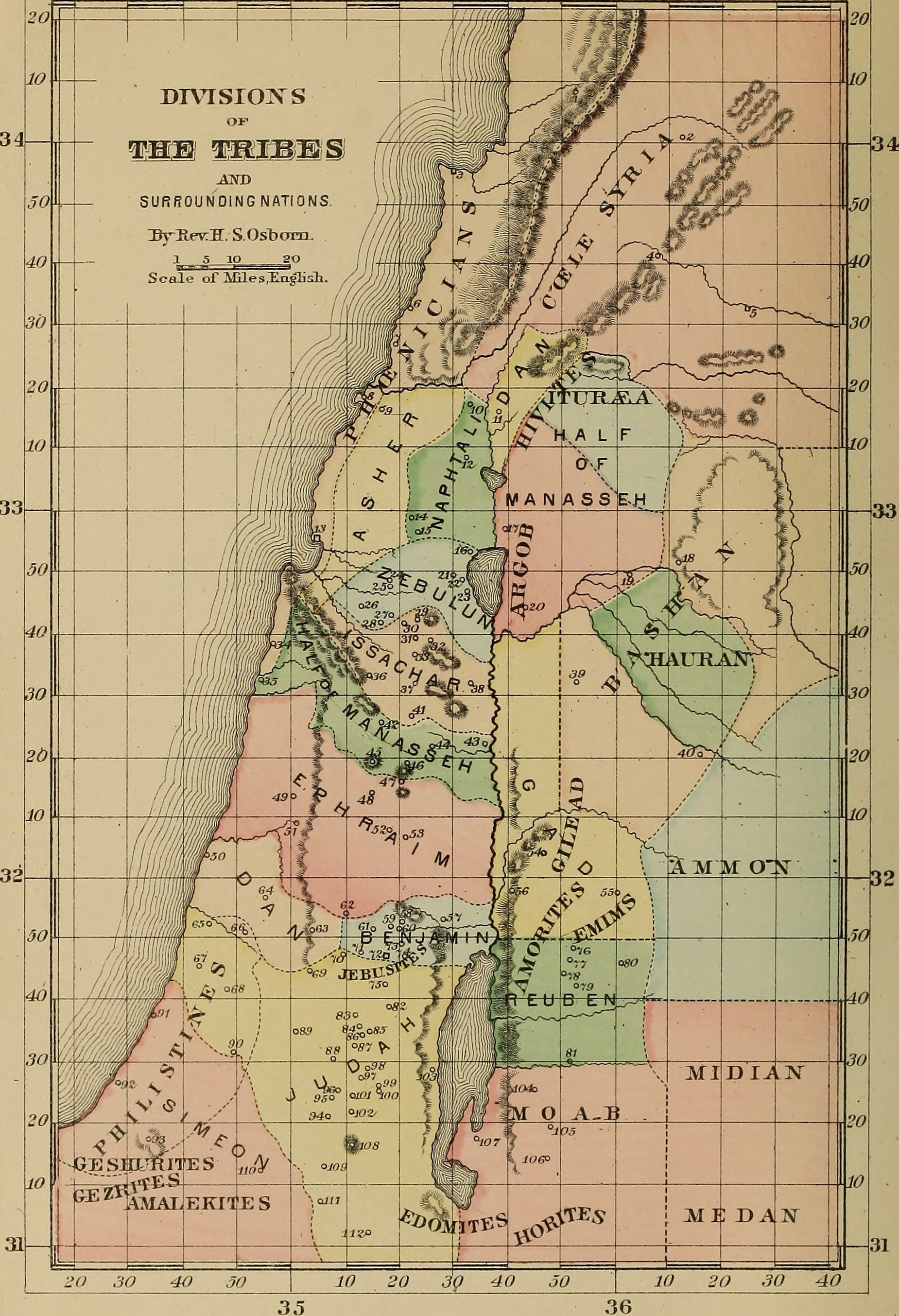

Beth-Nimrah or Beth-nimrah (Hebrew: בית נמרה), also called Nimrin and Bethennabris, was an ancient city in Transjordan, which features prominently in the history of ancient Israel and Judah. Tell Nimrin has been identified by Nelson Glueck as the last of three sites successively occupied by the ancient city.

== Etymology ==
Beth Nimrah means 'house of a leopard' in Hebrew, beit meaning 'house' and namer 'leopard' (cf. nimr in Arabic).

Later in antiquity, the city took on the name Nimrin, until its demise in the first century CE. In Talmudic literature, it is mentioned as Nimrin or Nimri.

The name is preserved in the names Tell Nimrin (for the archaeological mound) and Wadi Nimrin (for the wadi-type valley). Glueck suggests a possible connection between Wadi Nimrin and the biblical "Waters of Nimrim" (Isaiah 15:6 and Jeremiah 48:34), although he identifies "this stream" with Seil en-Numeirah (not clear if he refers by "this stream" to Seil en-Numeirah, or to Jeremiah's "Waters of Nimrim"). Seil en-Numeira is a stream that flows into the Dead Sea at its southern end.

== Location ==
The city was located in the Jordan Valley, approximately 12 kilometers (7.5 mi) north of the Dead Sea and 16 kilometers (9.9 mi) east of Jericho. Wadi Nimrin, on whose south (left) bank all three sites identified by Glueck with Beth Nimra are located, marks the northern limit of the Plains of Moab.

The ancient city was believed by Glueck to have moved twice in its history, occupying successively three mounds: Tell el-Mustaḥ during the Early Bronze I, Tell Bleibil in Iron Age I-II, and Tell Nimrin in the Roman through to the Early Muslim period, with similar large historical sedentary habitation gaps as those encountered elsewhere across the Jordan Valley. Glueck based his dates on sherds found at the surface and, in the case of Tell el-Mustah and Tell Nimrin, in cuts caused by modern roads.

Tell el-Mustah rises south of Wadi Sha'ib (Wadi Shu'ayb in more recent spelling), which is the name of an easterly section of the same wadi which takes on the name Wadi Nimrin when it reaches Tell Nimrin. Tell Bleibil is just across the wadi from Tell el-Mustah, so on the north side of Wadi Sha'ib. Tell el-Mustah stands c. 1.75 km ENE of Tell Nimrin, both being located on the south side of the wadi. The tells of Mustah and Bleibil are in the foothills flanking the plain of Nimrin from the east, while Nimrin is further down the slope. Glueck describes Tell Nimrin in 1943 as being situated very close to the east of the Arab village of Shuneh (now Ash-Shunah al-Janubiyah or South Shuneh). About Tell Nimrin, see also Alexander Ahrens' Wadi Shuʿayb Archaeological Survey (2018).

== Hebrew Bible ==
It was assigned to the Tribe of Gad (Numbers 32:36). In the Book of Joshua it was said to have belonged formerly to the kingdom of Sihon (Joshua 13:27).

== History ==
=== Iron Age ===
Excavations at Tell Bleibil, the ancient site identified by Glueck as the site of Nimrah during the Iron Age, show that during this period the settlement was enclosed by a massive casemate fortifications over 12 meter high; they were constructed around the late 9th to the early 8th century BCE. Inside the settlement, archaeologists discovered evidence for long-term occupation spanning roughly 250 years, with domestic spaces, storage and grinding installations, loom weights, lamps and cultic objects such as a pillar figurine. Multiple areas feature destruction layer caused by intense fire, indicating the site was destroyed likely in the early 6th century BCE.

=== Persian period ===
In the 4th century BCE, the city was settled by Israelites who had returned from the Babylonian exile and marked the furthest extent eastward of Jewish settlement in Transjordan.

=== Roman and Byzantine periods ===
In c. 65 CE, the village was the site of a fierce battle during the First Jewish–Roman War under Vespasian, which saw the defeat of the town's defenders. The non-combatants were exterminated, the able-bodied fled, the houses were ransacked by the soldiery, and the village set on fire.

The town is also mentioned in the Mosaic of Rehob, which was laid sometimes between the late 3rd and the 6th/7th centuries CE.

== Bibliography ==
- Glueck, Nelson (October 1943). "Some Ancient Towns in the Plains of Moab". Bulletin of the American Schools of Oriental Research (91): 7-26 (see 10-12). doi:10.2307/3219054. JSTOR 3219054. S2CID 163213632.
