= Wadi Numeira =

Wadi in Jordan

Wadi Numeira is a Wadi in Jordan that is known for its deep gorge cut through the sandstone. It gives its name to the Bronze Age ruins located at its mouth with the Dead Sea. The Wadi also sometimes nicknamed Petra with water.

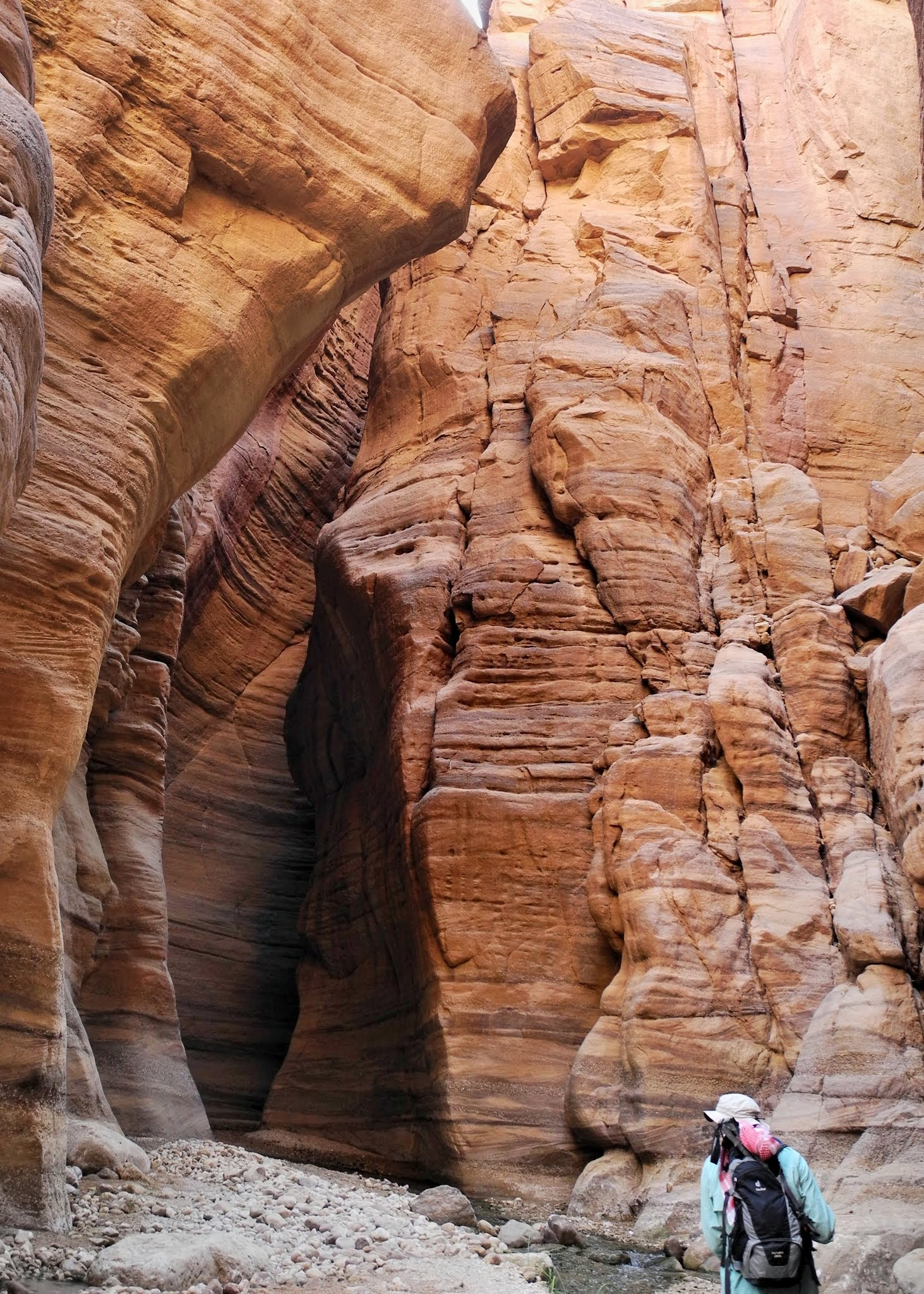
In the Siq

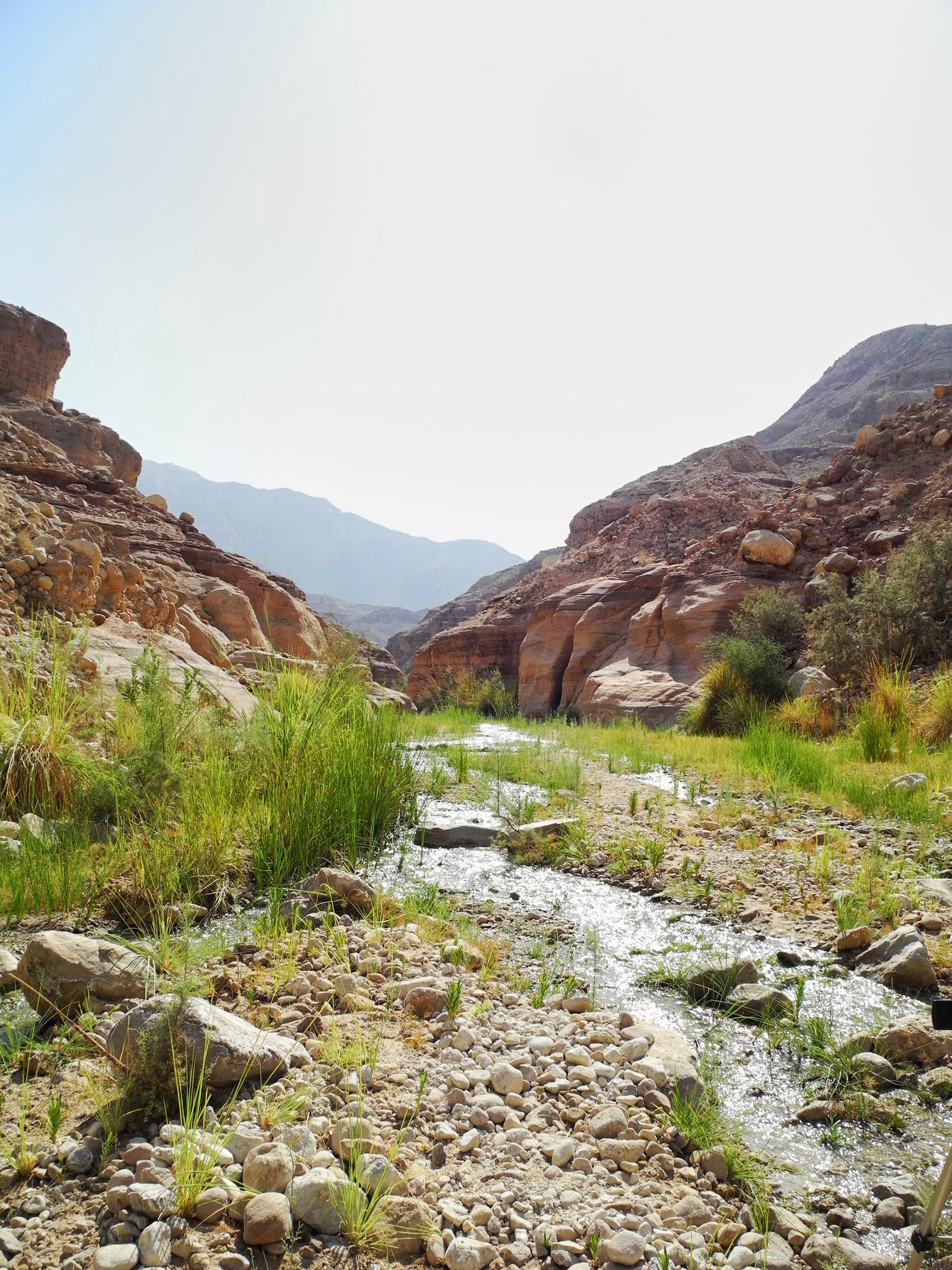
Wadi Numeira In the Valley

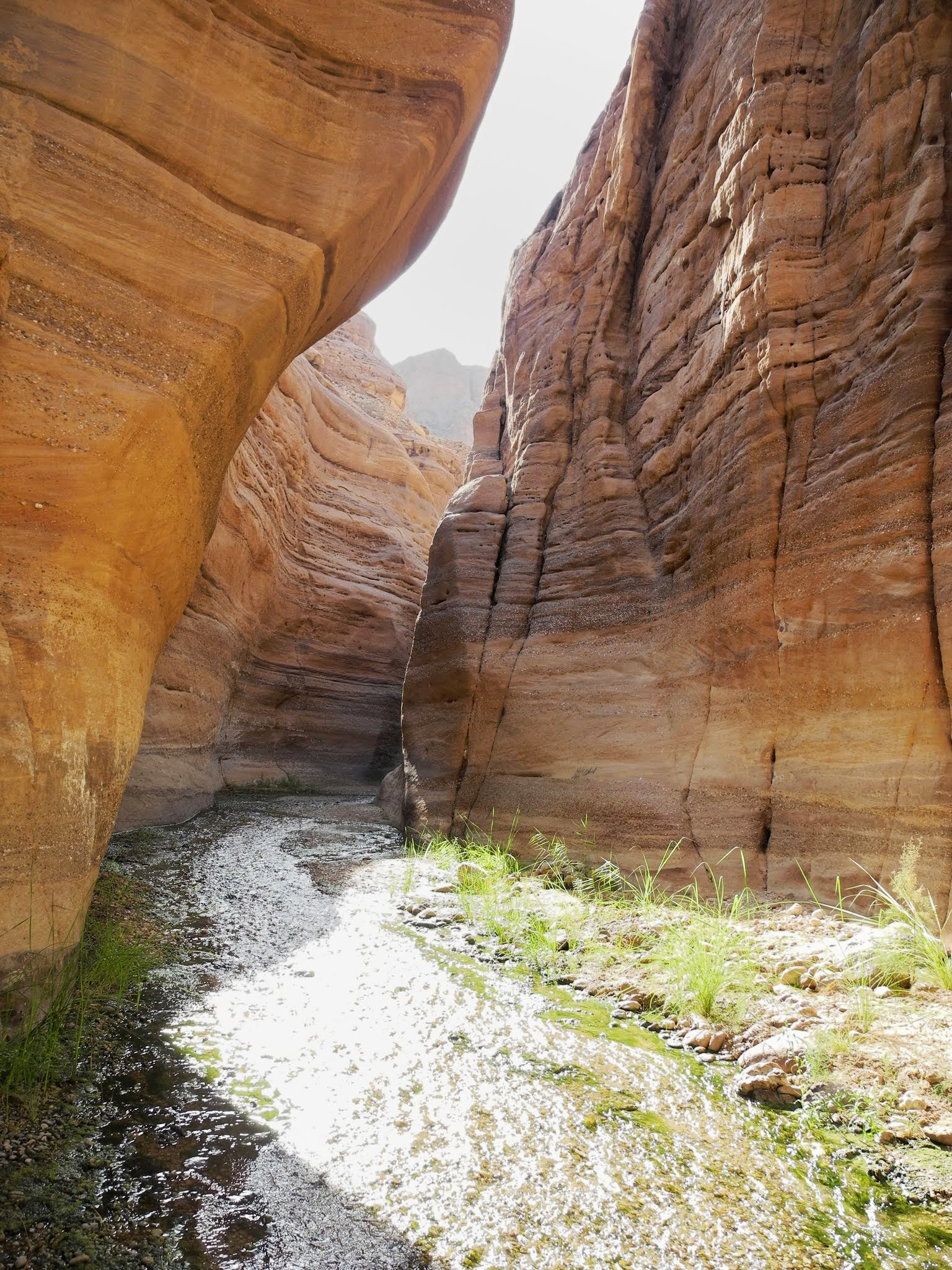
Wadi Numeira Siq

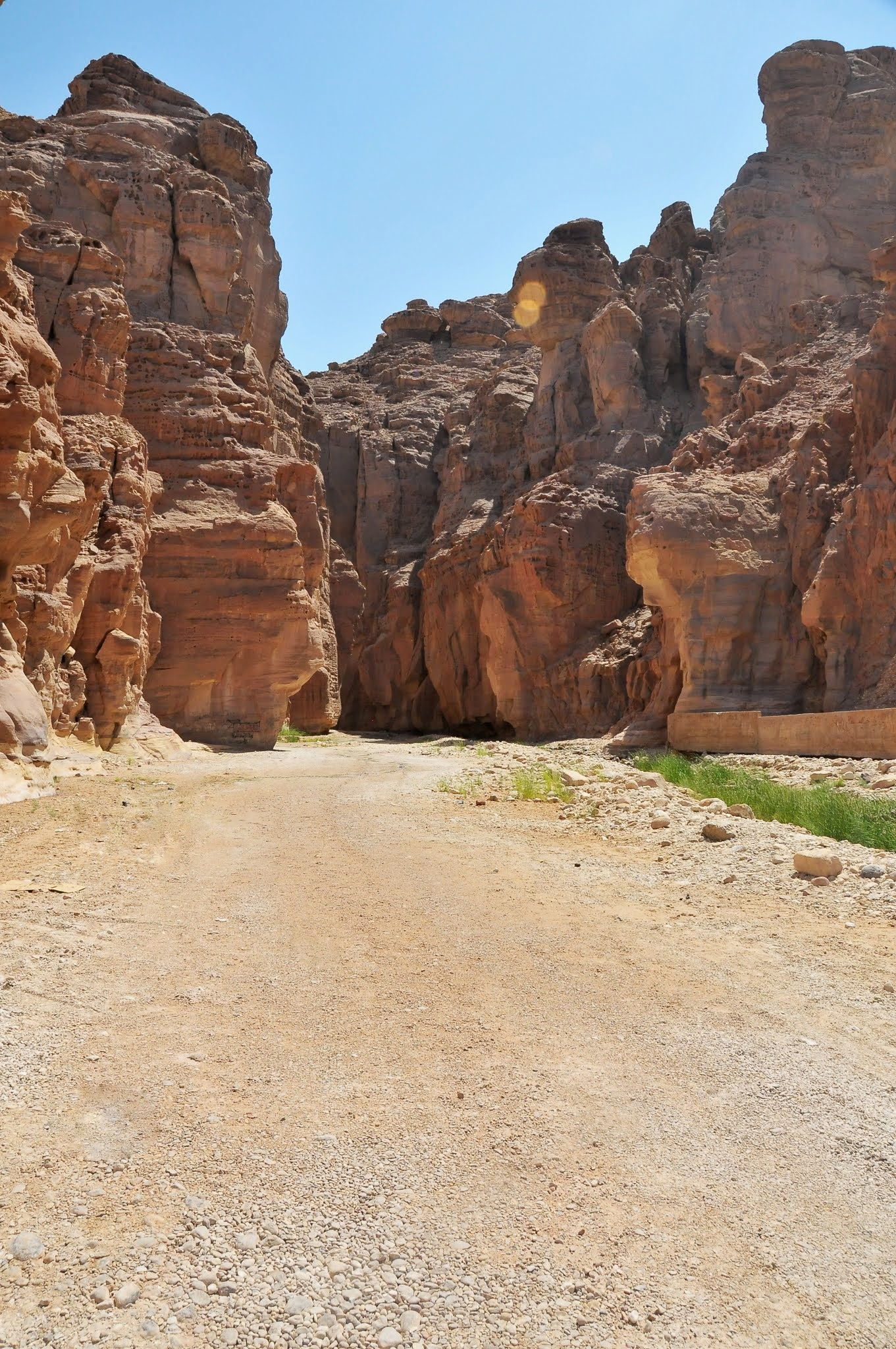
Starting Point of the Gorge

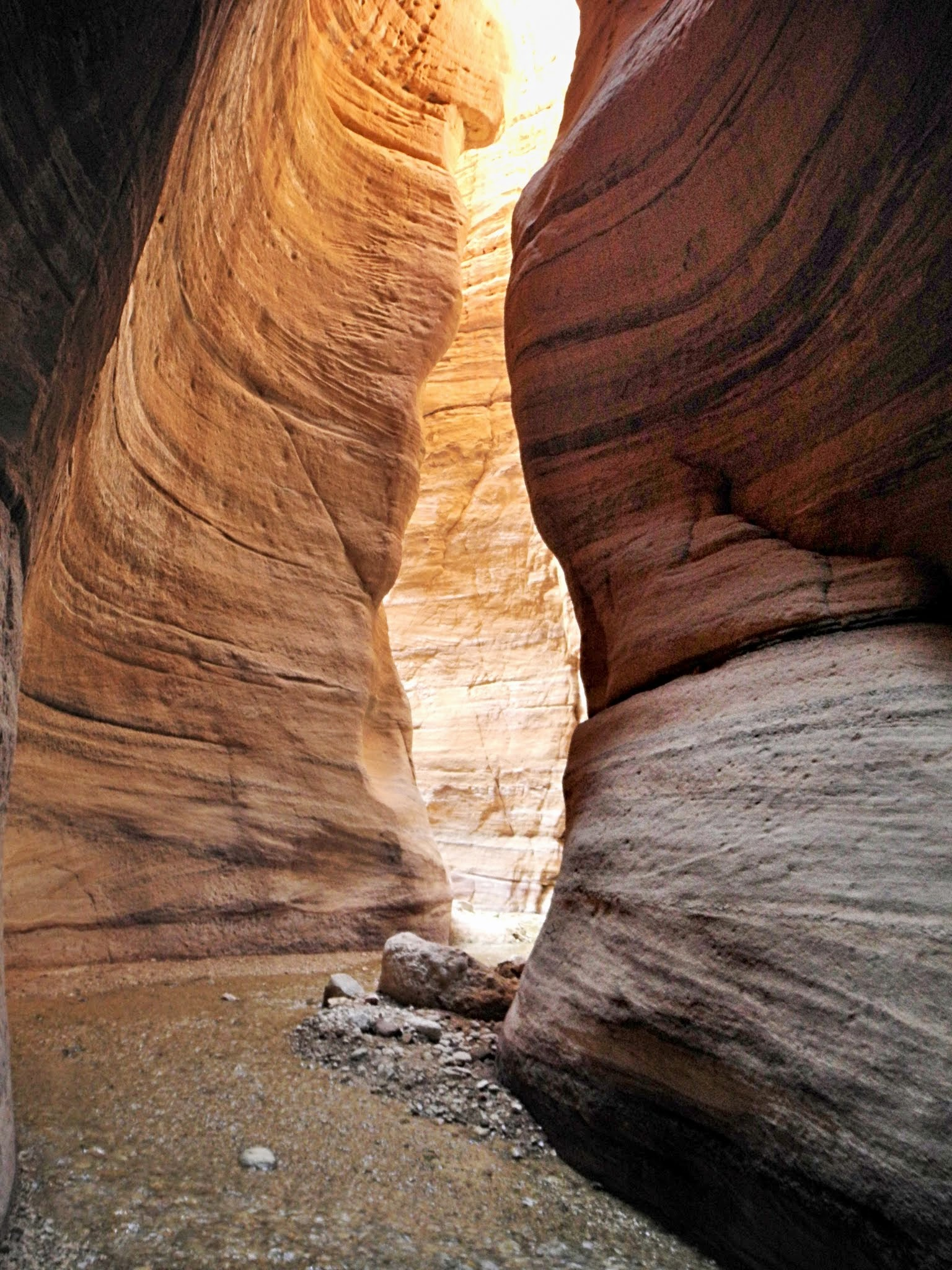
Wadi Numeira in the Siq

The Wadi enters the Dead Sea at a site 280m below Sea Level, on the shore of the Dead Sea. Here the river flows adjacent to the archaeological site, of Numeira. The river is significantly eroding the archaeological site, destroying perhaps as much as ½ the original settlement due to changes in the water course.

In 1943 Nelson Glueck mentioned Seil en-Numeirah (seil meaning stream), a stream that flows into the southern end of the Dead Sea.
