= Tell el-Hammam =

Archaeological site in Jordan

- تل الحمام
- Tall al-Hammam
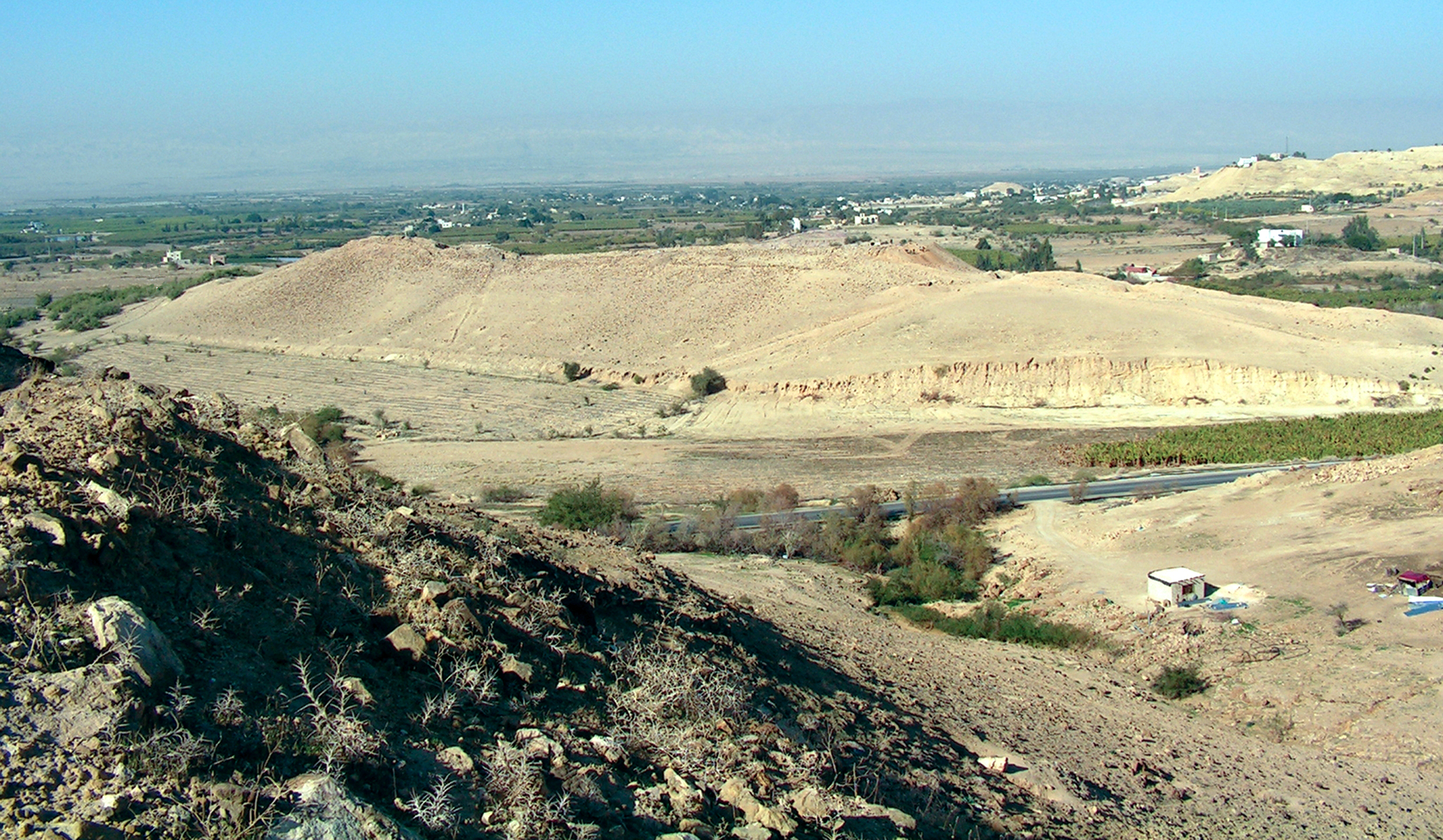
- Tell el-Hammam overlooking the Jordan Valley

- Location within Jordan
- 31.8402°N 35.6737°E
- Cultures: Chalcolithic, Early Bronze Age, Middle Bronze Age, Late Bronze Age, Roman Age, Byzantine, Umayyad
- Location: Jordan
- Region: Amman Governorate

Site notes
- Excavation dates: 1975–1976, 1990, 2005-2016
- Archaeologists: Kay Prag, Steven Collins

Tell el-Hammam (also Tall al-Hammam) is an archaeological site in the Amman Governorate of Jordan, in the eastern part of the lower Jordan Valley 11.7 kilometers east of the Jordan River and not far from its mouth. It lies 12.6 kilometers northeast of the Dead Sea. The site has substantial remains from the Chalcolithic, Early, Intermediate, and Middle Bronze Age, and from Iron Age II. There are different attempts at identifying the site with a biblical city. The Hammam Megalithic Field lies nearby. Other archaeological sites in the vicinity include Tall Nimrin, Tall Bleibel, Tall Mustah, Tall Iktanu, Tall Tahouna, Tall Barakat, Tall Kafrayn, and Tall Rama.

The site covers an area of approximately 36 hectares, with a small high mound (Upper Tall) rising about 30 meters above the plain and an extensive lower town (Lower Tall) to the southwest. Occupation of the site began in the Late Chalcolithic period (4th Millennium BC) and continued through the Iron Age (1st Millennium BC) into the Hellenistic and Roman periods. The site reached its maximum extent during the Middle Bronze Age when significant fortifications were constructed.

Excavations at Tell el-Hammam have been ongoing since 2005, led by Steven Collins of Trinity Southwest University. The site has been the subject of controversy due to claims linking it to the biblical city of Sodom, a hypothesis rejected by mainstream archaeologists.

== History ==
The site was occupied beginning in the Late Chalcolithic period (4th Millennium BC) based on pottery finds. Architectural remains begin in the Early Bronze Age (3rd Millennium BC) and the site was protected by walls, upper and lower, at that time. In the Middle Bronze Age the site reached its maximum extent and fortifications were constructed. Occupation continued through the Iron Age (1st Millennium BC) into the Hellenistic and Roman period.

The argument that the Late Bronze Age settlement at Tell el-Hammam at Abel-Shittim was one of the Stations of the Exodus has been challenged. In classical antiquity, it has been suggested that it formed part of the city of Livias, the main centre or which is thought to have been at Tell er-Rameh, 2.75 km (1.71 mi) northwest of Tell el-Hammam.

== Archaeology ==
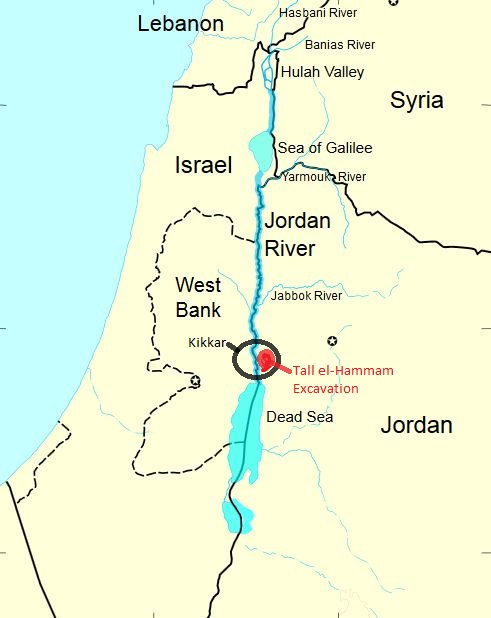
Tall el-Hammam Excavation-Jordan Valley

The site covers an area of about 36 hectares of which about 26 hectares are within fortifications, with a small high mound (Upper Tall), which rises to about 30 meters above the plain, and an extensive lower town (Lower Tall) extending to the southwest which is privately owned and currently used for agriculture. The high mound has been impacted by military trenches and roadwork. The upper and lower areas were protected by walls beginning in the Early Bronze Age. The site reached its maximum extent in the Middle Bronze Age (termed Intermediate Bronze Age by the excavator).

Claude Reignier Conder recorded the site in the nineteenth century, and Père Mallon described it in detail in 1932. Both noted remains of a Roman bath complex that have since disappeared, which presumably gave the tell its name ("Hill of the Hot Baths"). In 2011 a small Byzantine bath installation (5 m x 2 m) was indeed discovered at the site.

In 1941, Nelson Glueck visited the site (also called Tell el-Hammeh es-Samri according to Glueck) which he associated with biblical Abel haš-Šittum (Abel-Shittim). On the high mound Glueck found large numbers of Iron Age I-II and a smaller number of Early Bronze and Late Chalcolithic pottery shards. He noted an Iron Age fortress, oriented southwest by northeast, at the summit. It was enclosed by a 1.2-meter fortress wall measuring 140 meters by 25 meters, with defensive towers at the narrow ends. There appeared to be a 33-meter-by-17-meter inner citadel. He stated the site was about 2.5 kilometers southeast of Tell el-Kefrein. He also indicated that the small (5 meters high and 60 meters in diameter) site of Tell Abu Qarf, lying 0.5 kilometers southwest, appeared to be part of the same settlement complex as Tall el-Hammam. Glueck also examined the dolmens at the nearby Hammam Megalithic Field and Tell Iktanu.

The Australian archaeologist Kay Prag briefly surveyed the site on behalf of the British Institute at Amman for Archaeology and History in 1975–1976, while working at nearby Tell Iktanu. Prag returned in 1990 to complete the survey in the lower town finding a 3.5-meter-wide fortification wall faced with large limestone blocks. Noting that the high mound fortress area had been "much bulldozed" the brief excavation effort focused on the lower town in an Early Bronze I area.

Between 2006 and 2016, excavations have been conducted at the site, directed by Steven Collins of Trinity Southwest University, an unaccredited biblical inerrantist institution in the United States.

=== Controversial identification as Biblical Sodom ===
Attempts have been made to link the site to the legendary biblical city of Sodom, a claim rejected both by scientists and by other biblical literalists. In 2016, a team from the University of Oxford noted that the excavations had resulted in significant disruption to the ancient mound, and archaeologists have expressed concern that by linking the site to Sodom the excavators encourage looting and the illegal trade of antiquities, because objects "marketed explicitly to people seeking a tangible connection with the Bible" are in high demand.

=== Discredited air burst claim ===
In September 2021, a group of researchers sponsored by the Comet Research Group, including one member of the Trinity Southwest University excavation team, published a paper claiming that Tell el-Hammam was destroyed cataclysmically by an airburst. Two-thirds of the authors are members of the Comet Research Group, which also claims that the Younger Dryas were caused by a comet impact. The theory was presented in conjunction with the claim that the site may be the source of the biblical story of the destruction of Sodom.

This paper was widely criticized as pseudoscience, including by Mark Boslough, a physicist cited in the paper. Elisabeth Bik, an expert in investigating scientific misconduct, showed that the authors altered many of the images used as evidence. A March 2022 review of the evidence for an impact event states that the proper criteria for showing an airburst have not been met.

On February 15, 2023, the following editor's note was posted on this paper: "Readers are alerted that concerns raised about the data presented and the conclusions of this article are being considered by the Editors. A further editorial response will follow the resolution of these issues." On April 24, 2025, Scientific Reports issued a formal retraction for the original study, citing errors in methodology, analysis, and data interpretation.

== See also ==
- List of cities of the ancient Near East
- List of minor biblical places
- Plains of Moab
