= Wadi Shueib =

Valley in Jordan

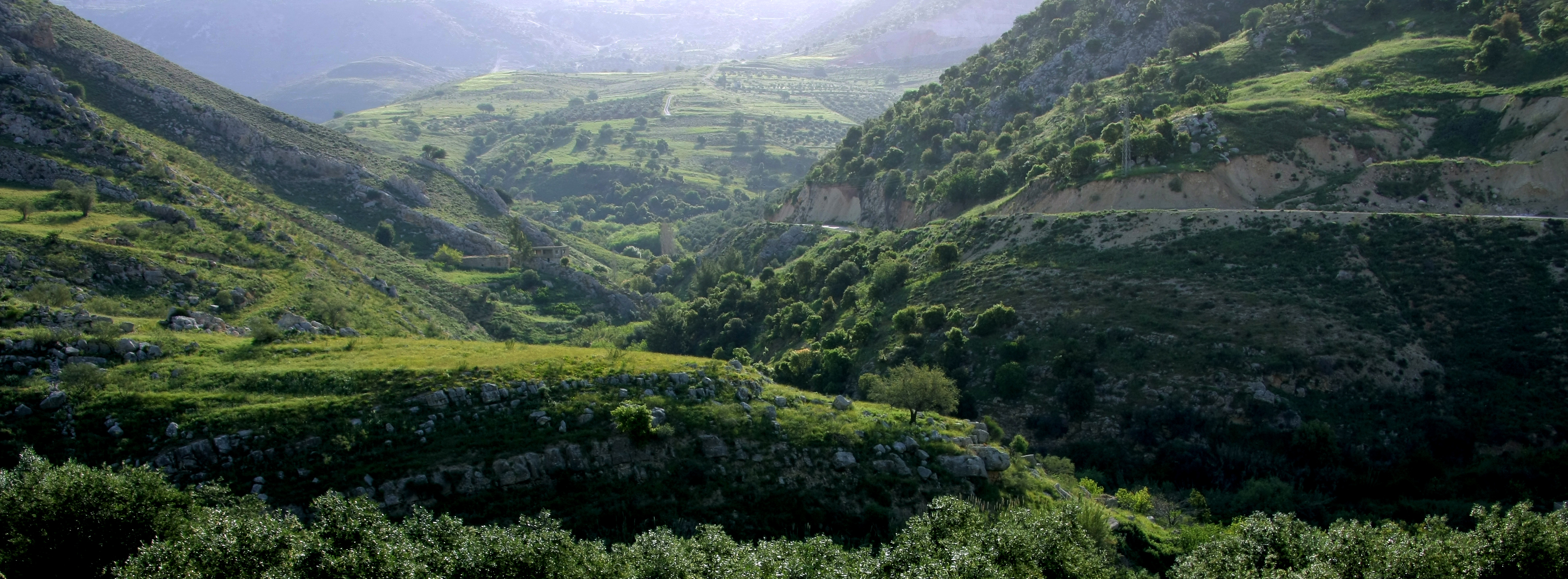

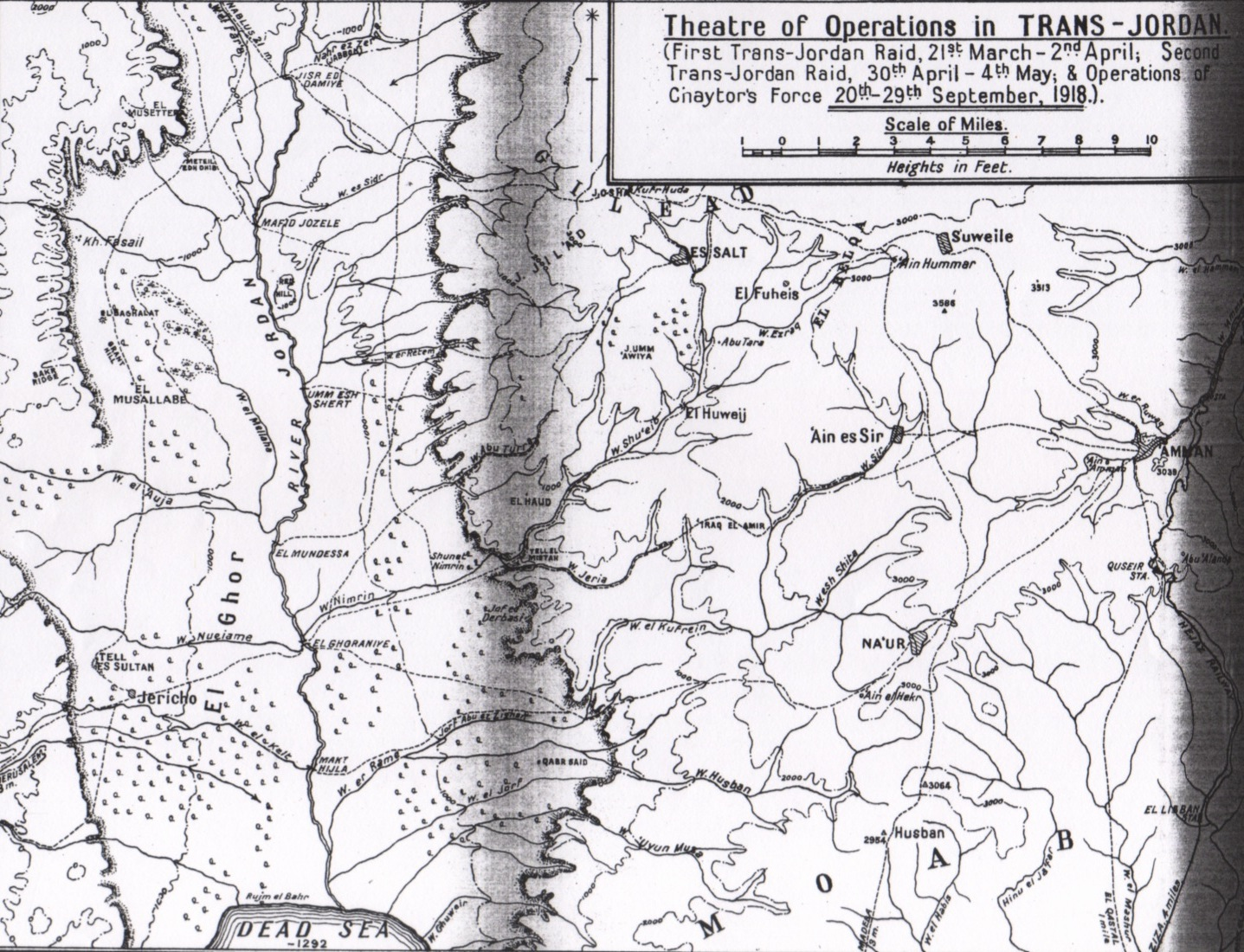
A military sketch showing W. Shu'eib and W. Nimrin

Wadi Shueib (Arabic: وادي شُعَيب), Arabic for the Valley of Jethro and properly Wadi Shuʿeib but with many variant romanisations, is a wadi in Jordan.

The alluvial fan of the wadi where it enters the southern part of the eastern Jordan Valley is known as Wadi Nimrin, which leads into the Jordan River. The site of Tell Nimrin is located at the southern end of Wadi Nimrin.

== Etymology ==
Wadi Shueib is named for the Biblical figure Jethro, Shuʿeib in Arabic.

== Geography and ecology ==
Wadi Shueib lies west of Sweileh at elevations from 1,200 meters (3,900 ft) to sea level. It drains an area of approximately 180 square kilometers (69 sq mi).

Towns and villages along the wadi include Salt, Fuheis, and Mahis, which discharge treated and untreated sewage into it.

== Modern dam ==
An earth-filled dam was constructed across it in 1968.

== Archaeology ==
Excavations have confirmed that the area was a major site during Jordan's Neolithic period.

== See also ==
- Rivers of Jordan
