= List of archaeological sites in Jordan =

This is a list of archaeological sites in the Hashemite Kingdom of Jordan organised by governorate.

- Heshbon
- Humayma
- Jalul
- Jerash
- Al-Jizah, Jordan
- Johfiyeh
- Kharaysin
- Khatt Shebib
- Khirbat Ataruz
- Khirbat Faynan
- Khirbat Iskandar
- Khirbat Nuqayb al-Asaymir
- Khirbet edh-Dharih
- Khirbet en-Nahas
- Khirbet es-Sar
- Khirbet et-Tannur
- Lehun
- Dhiban, Jordan
- Machaerus
- Monastery of St Lot
- Montreal (castle)
- Murayghat
- Nujais Shrine
- Numeira
- Qal'at Mudawwara
- Qasr al-Abd
- Qasr al-Qatraneh
- Rujm al-Malfouf
- Sakib
- Tall Al-Magass
- Tall Damiyah
- Tall Hujayrat Al-Ghuzlan
- Tall Zira'a
- Tell Abu al-Kharaz
- Tell el-Fukhar (Jordan)
- Tell el-Hammam
- Tell el-Kheleifeh
- Tell el-Maqlub
- Tell er-Rameh
- Tell Hammeh
- Tell Johfiyeh
- Tell Mar Elias
- Udhruh
- Tall al-Umayri
- Umayyad Palace
- Umm al-Walid
- Umm ar-Rasas
- Umm ar-Rasas mosaics
- Uyun al-Hammam
- Wadi Numeira
- Wu'ayra Castle

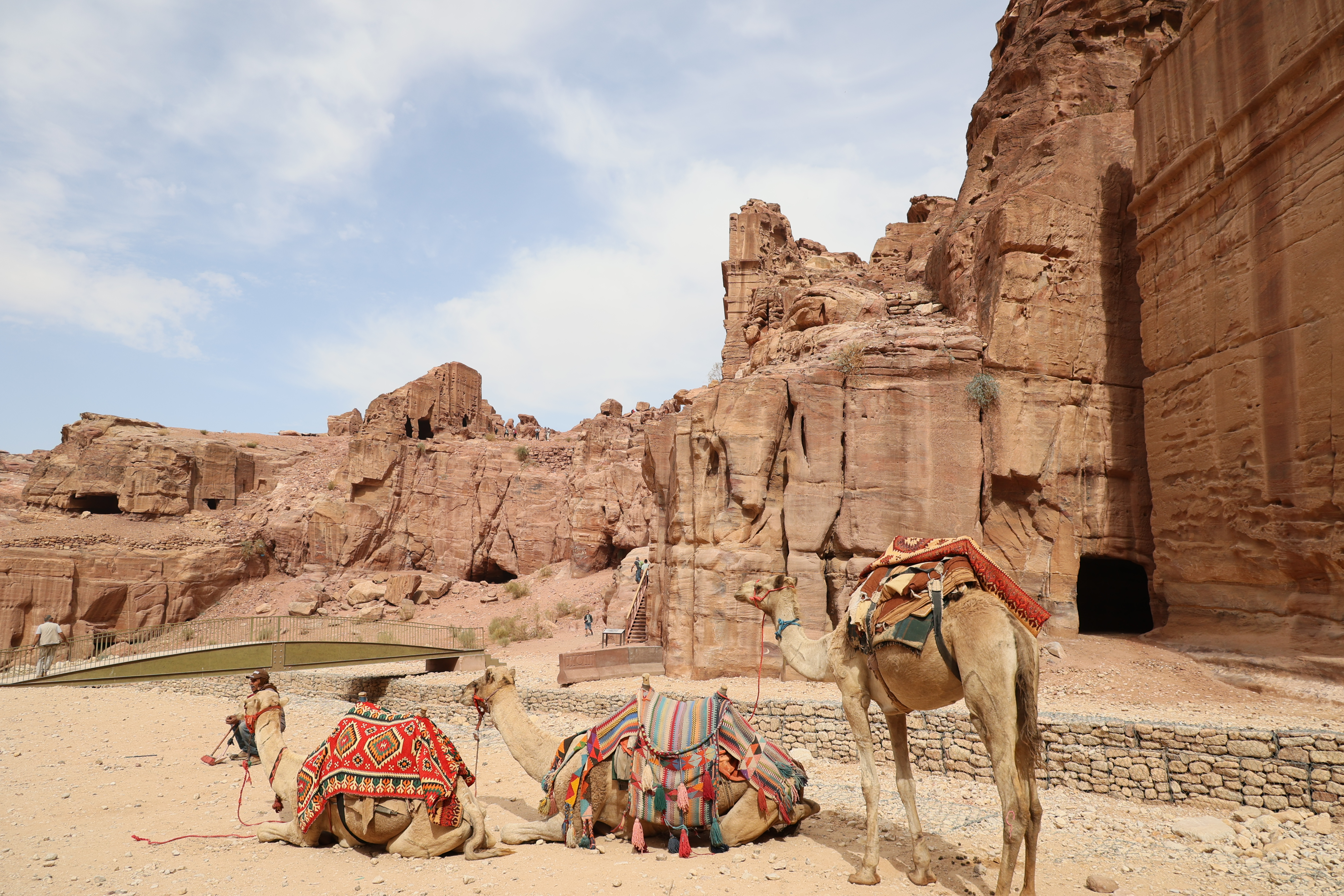
Archaeological site of Petra

== Irbid ==
- Irbid (el tal)
- Abila (Decapolis)
- Umm Qais
- Pella (Tabqet Fahl)
- Capitolias (Beit Ras)
- Cave de Sueth
- Gadara
- Wadi Hammeh 27
- Iraq ed-Dubb

== Ajloun ==
- Ajlun Castle

== Jerash ==
- Jerash (Gerasa)
- Synagogue-Church at Gerasa

== Mafraq ==
- Qasr Azraq
- Umm el-Jimal
- Dhuweila
- Jawa
- Qasr Burqu'

== Balqa ==
- Al-Maghtas (Bethany Beyond the Jordan)
- Deir Alla
- Teleilat el-Ghassul
- Wadi Shuʿeib

== Amman ==
- 'Ain Ghazal
- Odeon theatre (Amman)
- Roman Theatre (Amman)
- Great Temple, inaccurately known as the Temple of Hercules
- Ayyubid Watchtower (Amman)
- Nymphaeum (Amman)
- Amman Citadel
- Khirbet Yajouz

== Zarqa ==
- Azraq 18
- Kharaneh IV
- Wadi Jilat 6
- Wadi Jilat 7

== Madaba ==
- Madaba
- Madaba mosaic map
- Ayn al-Zara
- Fayfa
- Tall Jawa
- Mount Nebo

== Karak ==
- Al-Karak
- Bab edh-Dhra
- Betthorus
- Ghor es-Safi
- KPS-75
- Zahrat adh-Dhraʻ 2

== Tafilah ==
- Busaira, Jordan
- Gharandal

== Ma'an ==
- Petra
- Ba'ja
- Basta (archaeological site)

== Aqaba ==
- Aqaba Church
- Ashalim (archaeological site)
- Caracan

== See also ==
- List of World Heritage Sites in Jordan
- List of archaeological sites by country
