= Basta =

Basta may refer to:

== Places ==
- Basta, Astrakhan Oblast, Russia
- Basta, Beirut, Lebanon
- Basta, Greece, now Kryoneri
- Basta, Shetland, Scotland
- Basta, Jordan
  - Basta (archaeological site), prehistoric archaeological site
- Bașta, Romania, a village in Secuieni, Neamț

== People ==
- Basta (rapper) (born 1980), Russian rapper and producer
- BASta!, solo moniker for Joris Vanvinckenroye
- Adrian Basta (born 1988), Polish footballer
- Dušan Basta (born 1984), Serbian footballer
- Giorgio Basta (1544–1607), Italian general
- Jan Bašta (1860–1936), Czech engineer
- Jaroslav Bašta (1948–2024), Czech politician and diplomat
- Ricardo Basta, Argentinian-American jewelry designer

== Art, entertainment, and media ==
- Basta (album), a 1969 album by Quilapayún
- Basta, a fictional character in the Inkheart series by Cornelia Funke
- Basta (TV series), a Flemish program by Neveneffecten
- Basta (film), a 2021 Indian Marathi-language film

== Other uses ==
- Basta (company)
- Basta (herbicide) or glufosinate, a herbicide
- Basta (Odisha Vidhan Sabha constituency), assembly constituency of Odisha, India
- Ianthella basta, a sponge of family Ianthellidae
- ¡Ya basta!, roughly 'Enough is enough!' in Spanish
- Basta! (coalition), Portuguese political coalition
- Basta (São Tomé and Príncipe), São Tomé and Príncipe political party
- The Sudanese Arabic term for baklava

== See also ==
- Bastar (disambiguation)
