= Whatever =

Whatever may refer to:

== Music ==
=== Albums ===
- Whatever (Adore Delano album), 2017
- Whatever (Aimee Mann album), 1993
- Whatever (Danny Thompson album), 1987
- Whatever (The Friends of Distinction album), 1970
- Whatever (Green Velvet album), 2001
- Whatever (Hot Chelle Rae album) or the title song, 2011
- Whatever (Jennifer Batten album) or the title song, 2007
- Whatever..., a comedy album by Guido Hatzis, 2000
- Whatever: The '90s Pop & Culture Box, a Rhino Records box set, 2005
- Whatever, by Megumi Hayashibara, 1992
- Whatever, an EP by bbno$, 2018

=== Songs ===
- "Whatever" (Ayumi Hamasaki song), 1999
- "Whatever" (Cro song), 2013
- "Whatever" (En Vogue song), 1997
- "Whatever" (Godsmack song), 1998
- "Whatever" (Ideal song), 2000
- "Whatever" (Jill Scott song), 2005
- "Whatever" (Kygo and Ava Max song), 2024
- "Whatever" (Oasis song), 1994
- "Whatever" (The Statler Brothers song), 1982
- "Whatever", by 4minute from Name Is 4Minute, 2013
- "Whatever", by DJ Khaled from Grateful, 2017
- "Whatever", by Gnarls Barkley from The Odd Couple, 2008
- "Whatever", by Hüsker Dü from Zen Arcade, 1984
- "Whatever", by Imogen Heap from I Megaphone, 1998
- "Whatever", by Lil Tecca from We Love You Tecca 2, 2021
- "Whatever", by Our Lady Peace recorded for Gravity, 2002
- "Whatever", by Pitchshifter from PSI, 2002
- "Whatever", by Róisín Murphy from Take Her Up to Monto, 2016
- "Whatever", by Seulgi from Accidentally on Purpose, 2025
- "Whatever", by Zoé from Rocanlover, 2003

== Other uses ==
- Whatever (slang)
- Whatever (novel) (Extension du domaine de la lutte), a 1994 novel by Michel Houellebecq
  - Whatever (1999 film), a French adaptation of the novel, directed by directed by Philippe Harel
- Whatever (1998 film), an American teen drama by Susan Skoog
- Whatever with Alexis and Jennifer, a 2005–2010 American radio talk show
- Whatever, a blog by John Scalzi
- Whateversexual, expressing indifference towards sexuality labels

== See also ==
- Basta (disambiguation)
- -ever, a suffix
