= Dagara, Baleswar =

Dagara
- Village
- Location in Odisha, India Dagara (India)
- Coordinates: 21.566389°N 87.3233°E
- Country: India
- State: Odisha
- District: Baleswar
- Elevation: 12 m (39 ft)

Population
  - Total: 7,680

Languages
  - Official: Odia
- Time zone: UTC+5:30 (IST)
- PIN: 756083
- Vehicle registration: OD-01
- Website: odisha.gov.in

Dagara is a village situated in the Baleswar district of Odisha, in eastern India. The village, with a beach on the Bay of Bengal, is a well-known spot for local tourists. In 2006, the Government of Odisha signed a memorandum of understanding (MOU) with Chennai-based Creative Port Development Pvt Ltd. for the development of a deep-water, all-weather project, Kirtania port, at the mouth of the Subarnarekha River.

== Dagara Beach ==
Dagara has a scenic beach that draws local tourists during weekends. The beach is noted for red crabs, silvery sand, and Casuarina evergreen trees. It is one of the few beaches from which both sunrise and sunset can be viewed over the Bay of Bengal. Visitors come to enjoy the pleasant picnic areas, especially around the Christmas and New Year holiday season. Fishing by small boats with the local fishing flock is very popular.

Dagara Beach is relatively unknown beyond the states of Odisha and West Bengal, but the state government is taking measures to promote tourism in the area. Recently, a beach festival has been launched.

=== Dagara Beach Festival ===
The Dagara Beach Festival attracts thousands of visitors from the state of Odisha and neighboring West Bengal. The festival is a platform for performing artists and connoisseurs of classical dance.

The tourism department has prepared a composite plan detailing the infrastructure to support visitors, such as the construction of hotels, improved road connectivity, proper lighting and other facilities on the beaches. MP (Balasore) Rabindra Kumar Jena said the government has sanctioned Rs 8.46 crore for a tourism circuit between Chandipur, Dagara and Talasari.

== Transport ==
The nearest bus stop for service to Dagara is located in Kalipada, a distance of 9 kilometres (5.6 mi). Dagara is 64 km (40 mi) from Baleswar. The train connection is located in Jaleswar (58 km). Another railway station, Basta, is 25 km away (16 mi). The nearest airports are Bhubaneswar and Kolkata. Although Dagura is poorly connected by railway, bus transportation is available to Balasore, Bhubaneswar, Cuttack, Rourkela and various other parts of Odisha (with and without air conditioning). One can also stay at Chandipur and book a car to travel to dagara, which is approximately a 2-hour drive.
