= ʿAyn Qasiyya =

Early Epipalaeolithic archaeological site in Azraq, Jordan

ʿAyn Qasiyya is an Early Epipalaeolithic archaeological site in the Azraq Oasis, Jordan; the remains of a lakeside camp used by hunter-gatherers around 20,000 years ago. Located near a now-extinct aquifer-fed spring, at the time the site was occupied it was surrounded by a substantial wetland, attracting a wide range of animals which were hunted by the inhabitants.

Another archaeological site from around the same period, Kharaneh IV, is located approximately 37 kilometres (23 mi) west of ʿAyn Qasiyya.

== Discoveries ==
The site was discovered in 2001, embedded in a pool that was dug in the modern era to dig for water, and was primarily excavated from 2005 to 2007. It dates back to the end of the Last Glacial Maximum, consistent with the presence of a spring that dried up long before modern times. It is thought that, due to the marshy ground, the site was used sporadically over a long period of time.

Fragments of flint tools were found at the site consistent with knapping processes being carried out. The construction of these tools are associated with both the Kebaran and Nebekian cultures, suggesting that it was visited by people from different cultural groups. Fragments of bone tools were also found at 'Ayn Qasiyya, but to a lesser extent compared to the flint tools.

Animal remains found at the site largely consisted of the remains of various birds, wild pigs, wild boars, and large numbers of gazelles, hares and foxes. Of these, the remains are consistent with on-site butchering of gazelles.

A human burial was also found at the site, which is rare for this period. The burial is the second-oldest known burial from the early Epipaleolithic period in all of Jordan.
