= Aqaba Fortress =

Mamluk-Ottoman caravanserai and fort in Aqaba, Jordan

Coordinates: 29.521756°N 35.00203°E

- Aqaba, Jordan
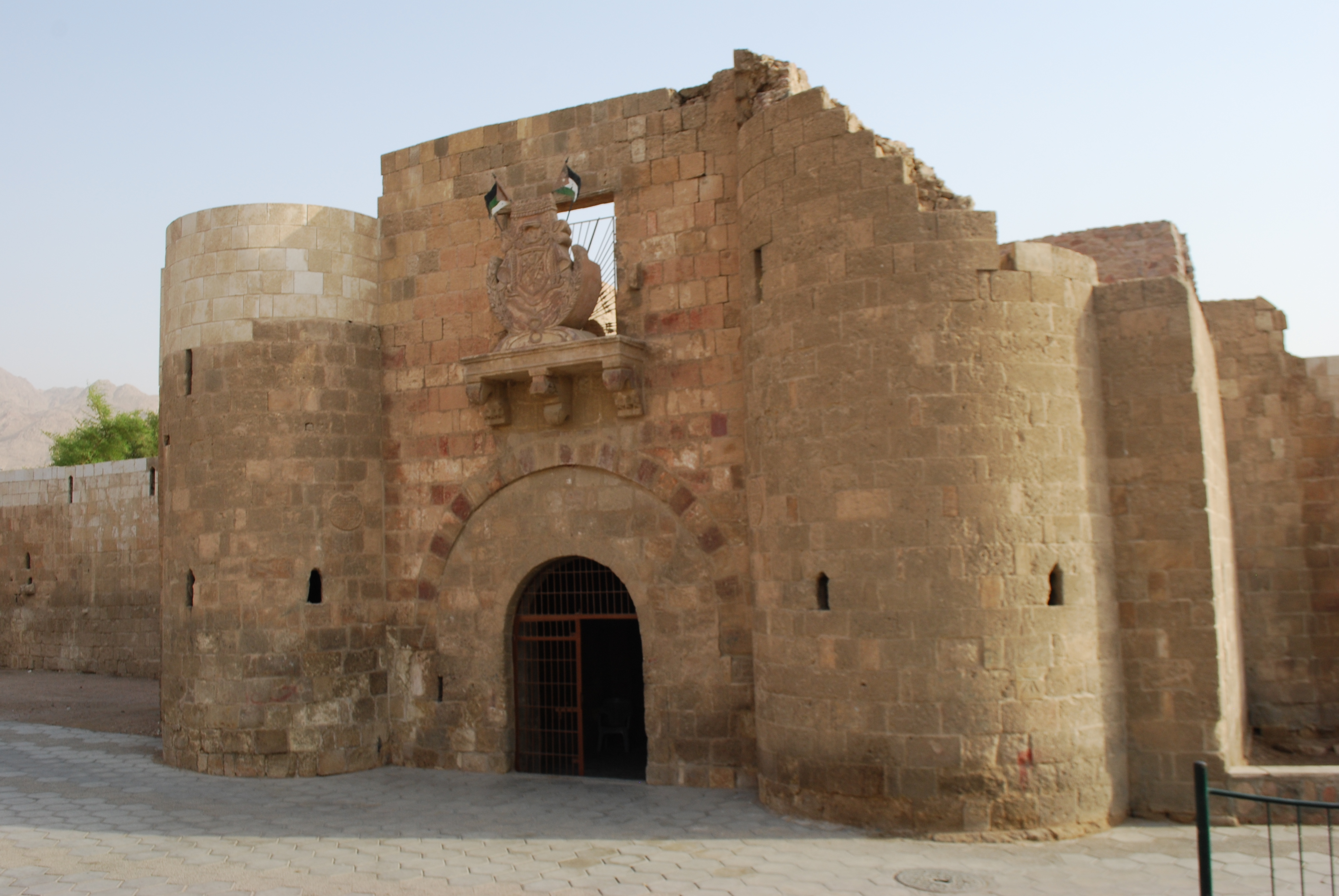

Site information
- Type: Fortified caravanserai, later military fort
- Controlled by: Mamluk Sultanate; Ottoman Empire; Arab Revolt

Location
- Location within Jordan

Site history
- Built: 16th century
- Materials: Stone
- Battles/wars: Battle of Aqaba (1917)

The Aqaba Castle or Aqaba Fort (Arabic: قلعة العقبة, romanized: Qalʿat al-ʿAqaba), also known as the Mamluk Castle of Aqaba, Jordan, is a Mamluk and Ottoman fortified caravanserai on the pilgrimage route to Mecca and Medina which, in its current form, dates back mainly to the 16th century. In the century preceding the First World War, it was used to a larger degree as a military stronghold.

In July 1917, the fortress was witness to a victory in the Battle of Aqaba as part of the Arab Revolt, when this heavily defended Ottoman stronghold fell to an Arab camel charge. Lawrence of Arabia rode triumphantly from here to Cairo to report the good news to General Allenby. The port of Aqaba became a major supply base for the advancing Arab Revolt.

The fort is located next to the Aqaba Flagpole, which carries the flag of the Arab revolt against the Ottomans. A building adjacent to the fort, which in 1917 served as Sharif Hussein's residence, now houses the Aqaba Archaeological Museum.

== History and archaeology ==
=== Crusader/Ayyubid period ===
The Early Muslim fortified city of Ayla (present-day Aqaba) was already in a dilapidated state in 1116, when King Baldwin I of Jerusalem reached it forcing its inhabitants to flee by ship to a nearby island. The Crusaders left a garrison behind in a small fort, which they either built themselves, or more likely, according to archaeologist Donald Whitcomb, inherited from the Ayyubids. Whichever the case, no 12th-century material could be identified during excavations anywhere at Aqaba, and Whitcomb's assumption is that it has been completely razed when the Mamluks built their own fort at the same location.

=== Mamluk and Early Ottoman periods ===
The Mamluk fort was built 1 kilometre south of Early Muslim Ayla and Denys Pringle credited in 1997 the first structure to Sultan Al-Nasir Muhammad (c. 1320). However, the still standing building is dated mainly to two construction phases, based on two inscriptions from the gatehouse: one runs the length of the vaulted room inside the gate and praises Mamluk sultan Al-Ashraf Qansuh Al-Ghuri (r. 1501–1516), and the second belongs to a medallion set above the first and is dedicated to Ottoman sultan Murad III who undertook substantial work in 1587.

=== Purpose ===
The fortified structure was initially built as a khan (inn or caravanserai) for Muslim pilgrims from Egypt performing Hajj. In 1841 it came under Egyptian control and work was done to strengthen it as a military position, with the mission to protect the same pilgrimage route.

=== Stages ===
Archaeological investigations in the western part of the structure indicate at least seven stages of occupation. From the Umayyad period, mainly irrigation installations were found. This was followed by a first khan dated to the 13th century, which had the same basic alignment as the later castle. Thirdly, a 14th or 15th-century khan was built, whose footprint corresponds generally to the current building. The last two stages correspond to the work mentioned in the two 16th-century inscriptions, one from the late Mamluk and the other from the early Ottoman period. The formerly polygonal towers facing eastwards were given a round shape after 1828. Shelling during World War I brought down the west wall and the northwest tower, and in commemoration of the 1917 Arab victory, the old machicolation protecting the entrance is decorated by a panel bearing the coat-of-arms of the Hashemites.

== Gallery ==
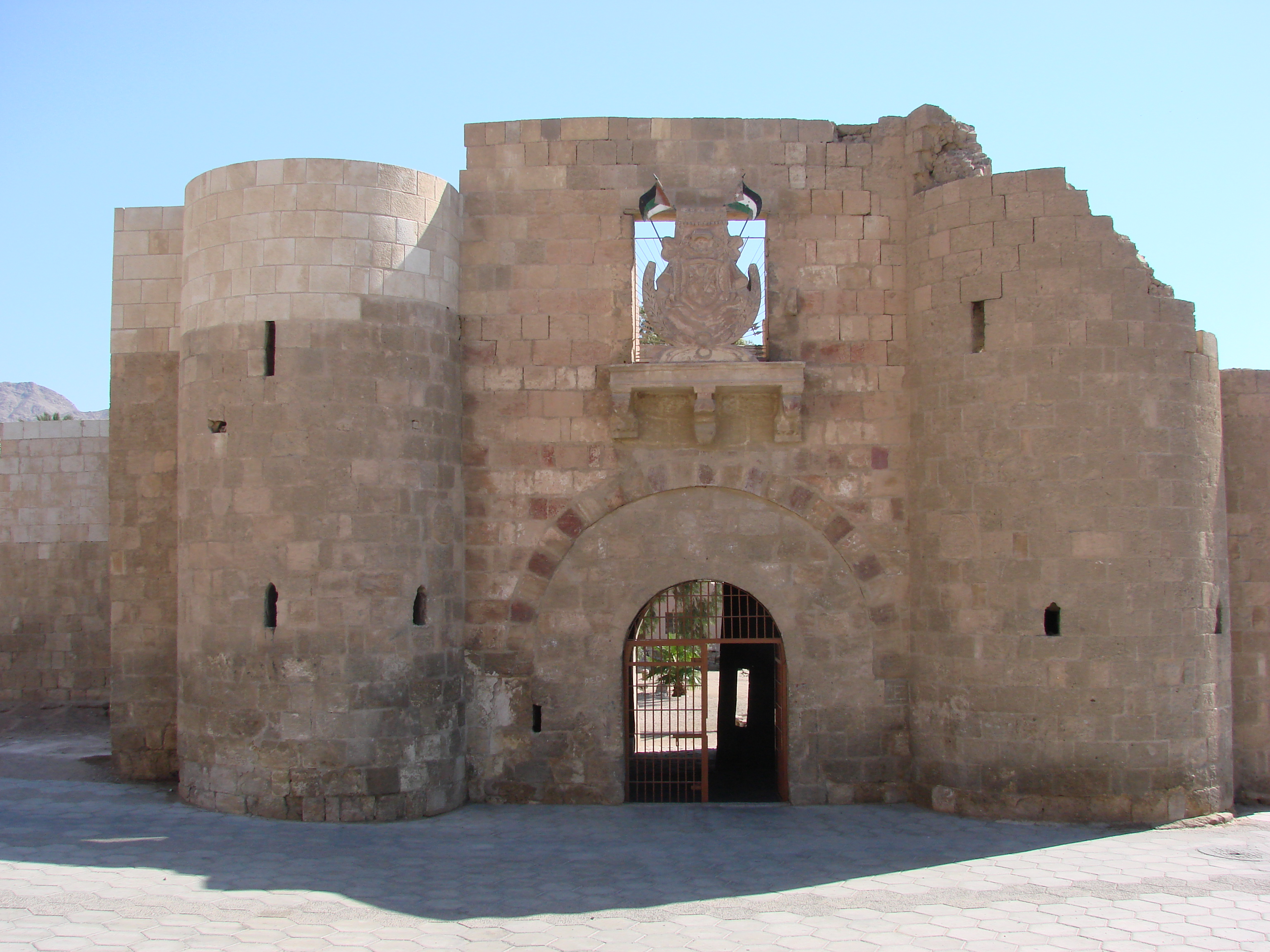
Gate and northern façade

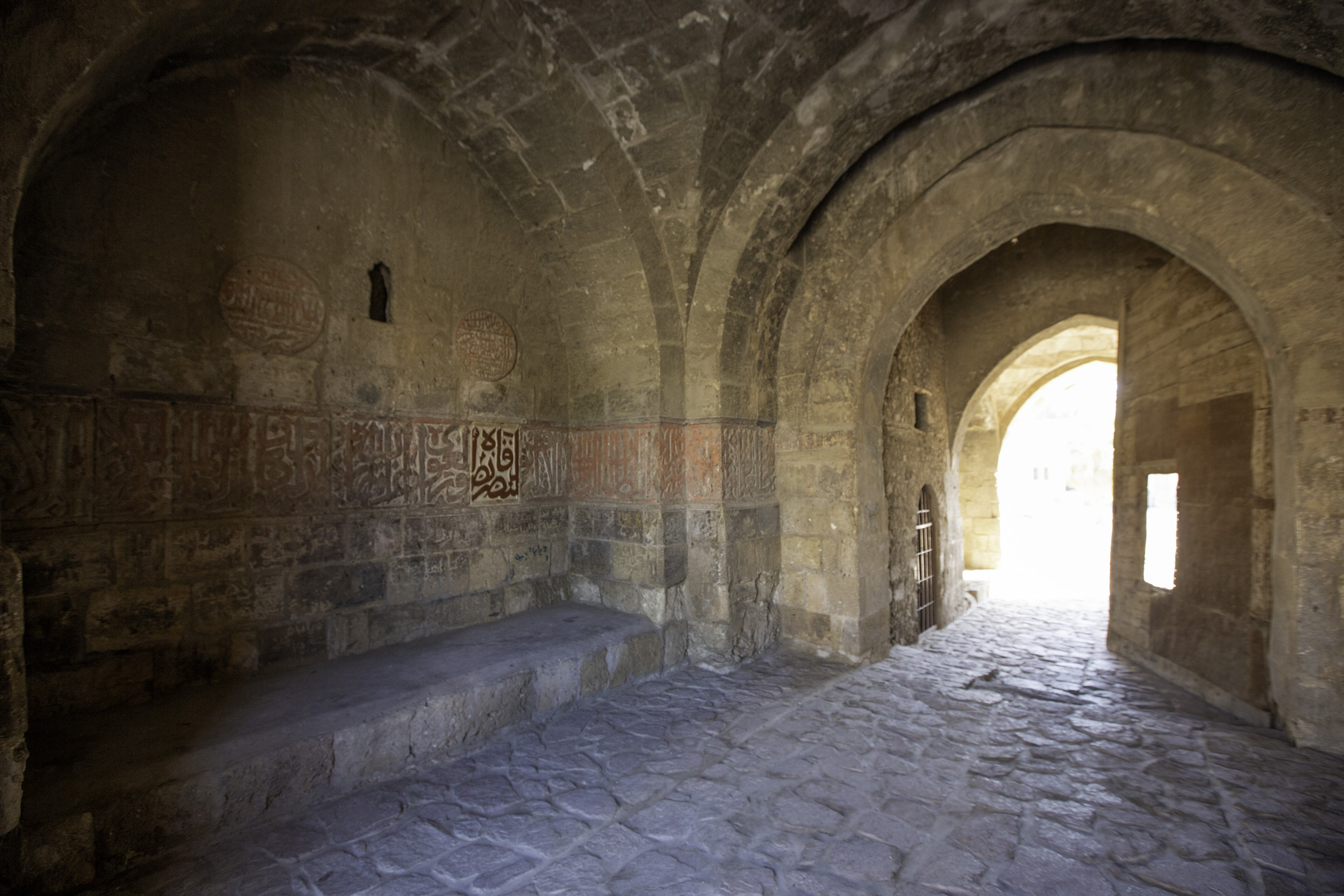
Vaulted passage inside the gatehouse (with carved Arabic inscriptions on the left)

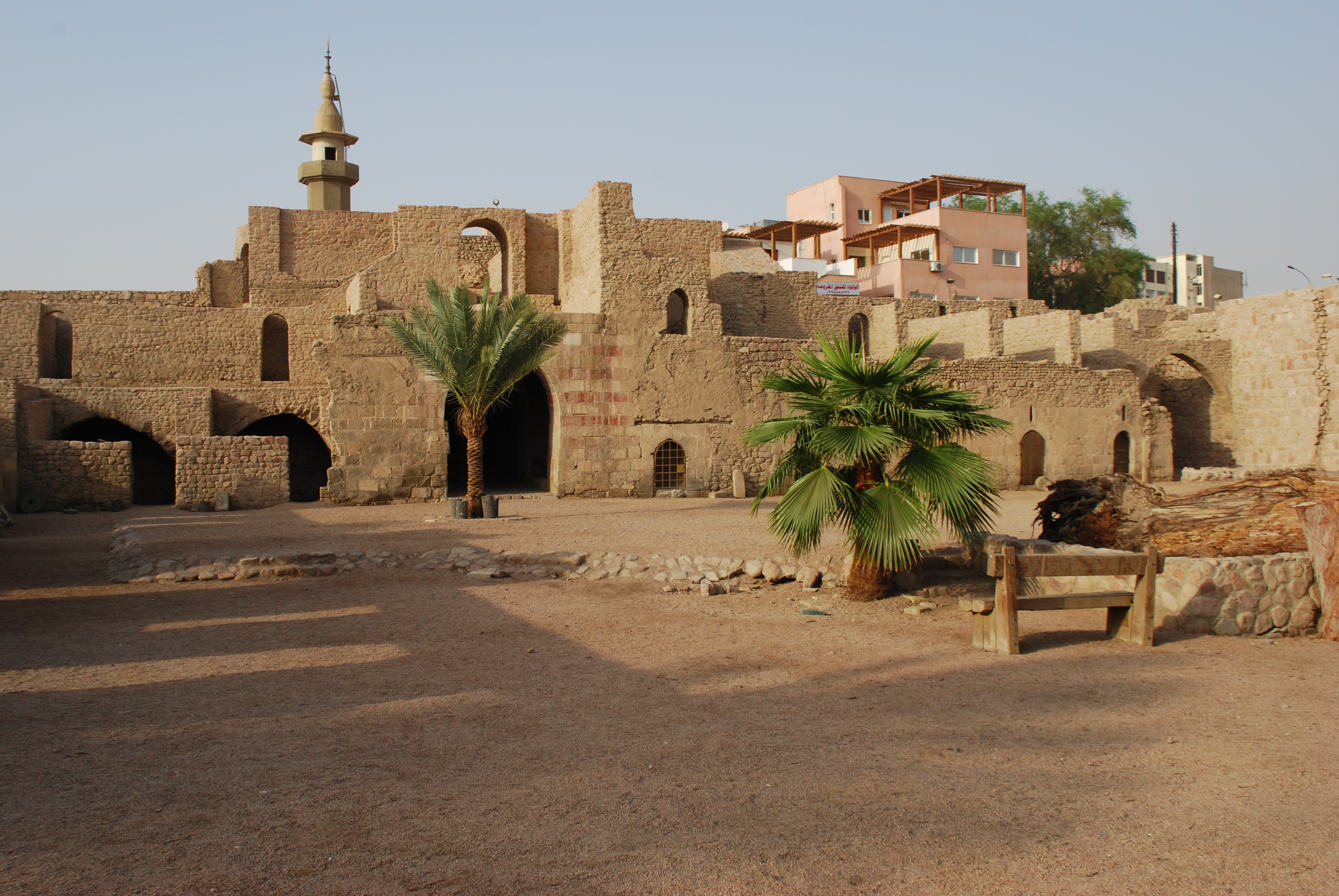
View of the interior, looking north towards the entrance

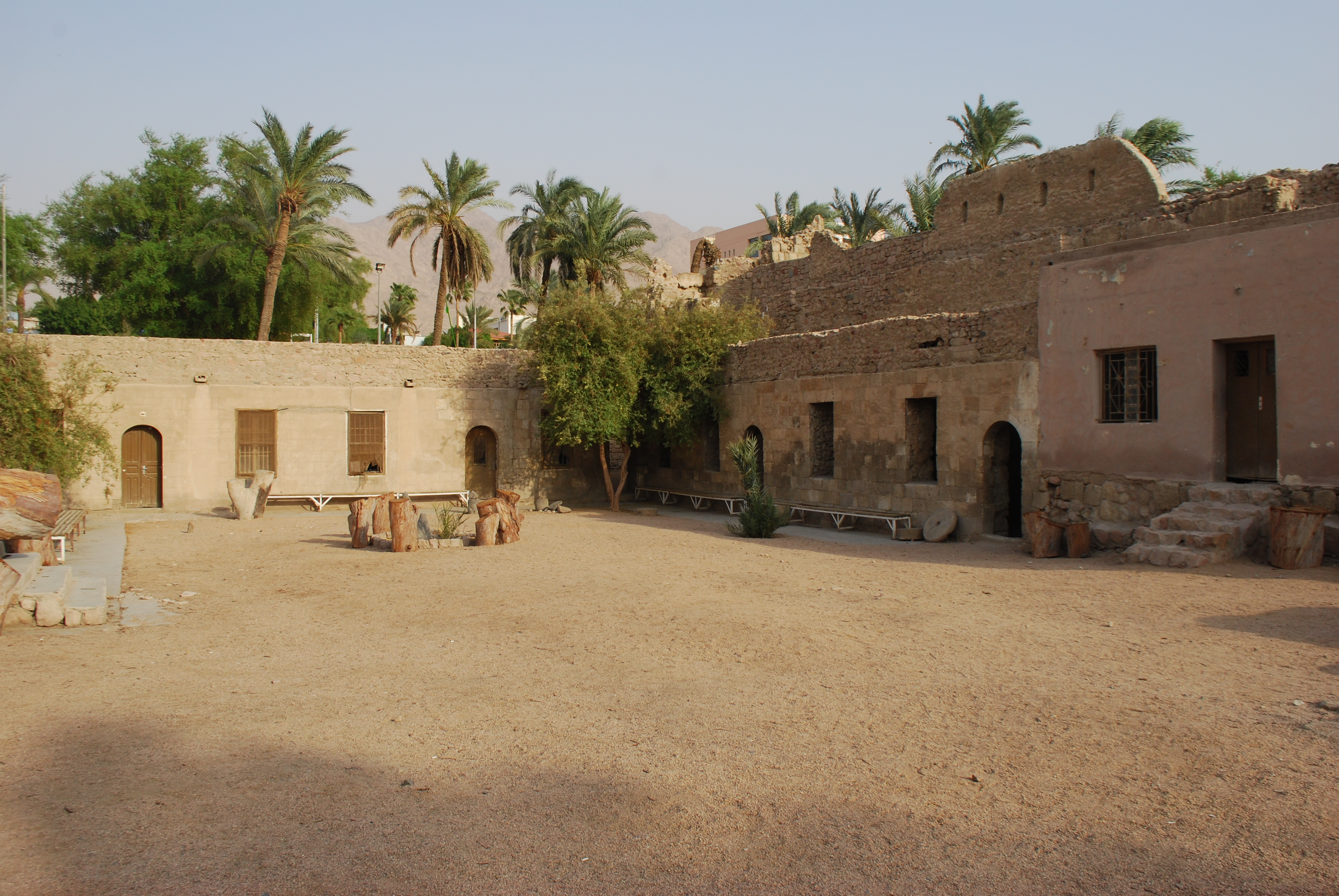
View of the interior, looking southeast

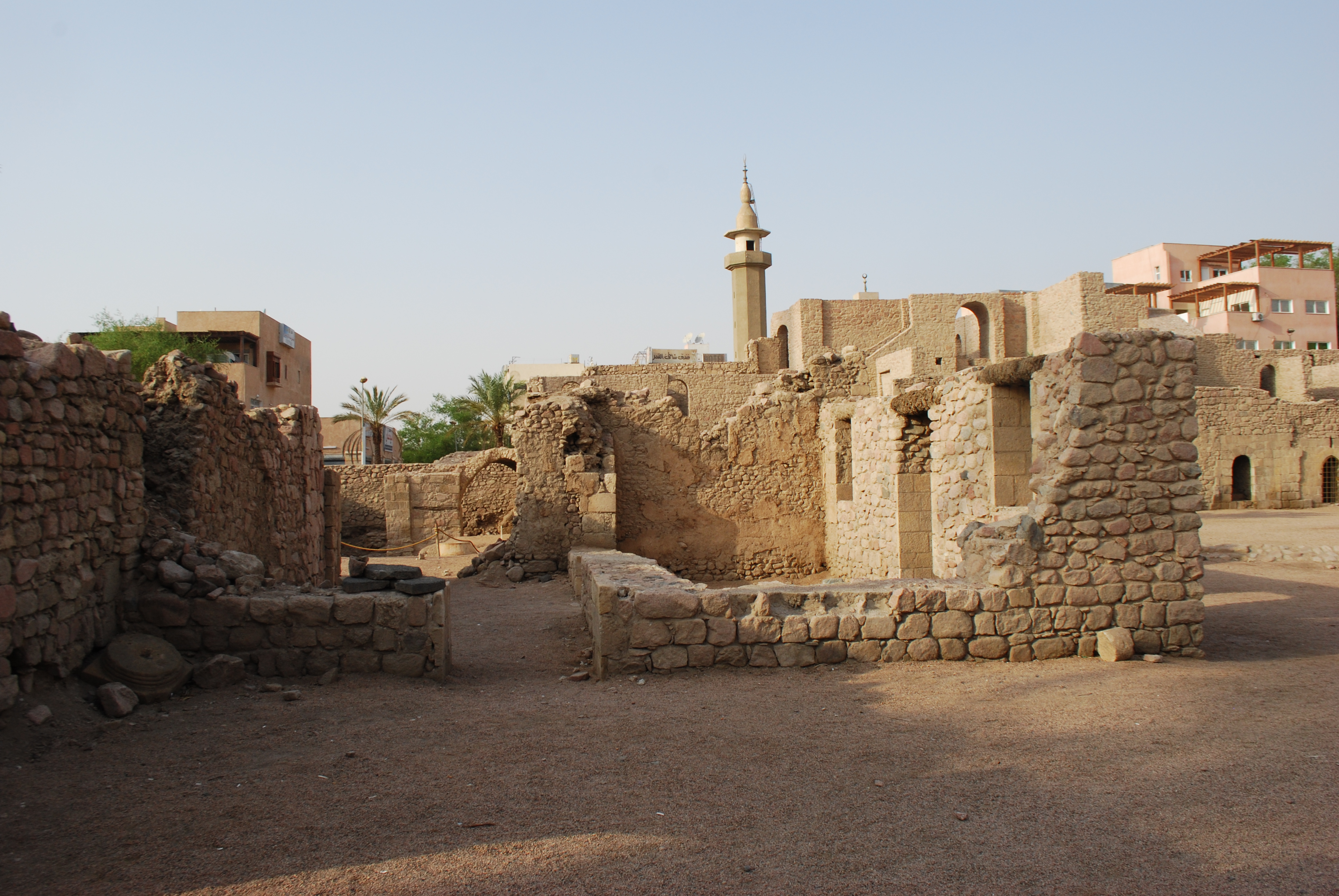
Ruins on the west side of the courtyard

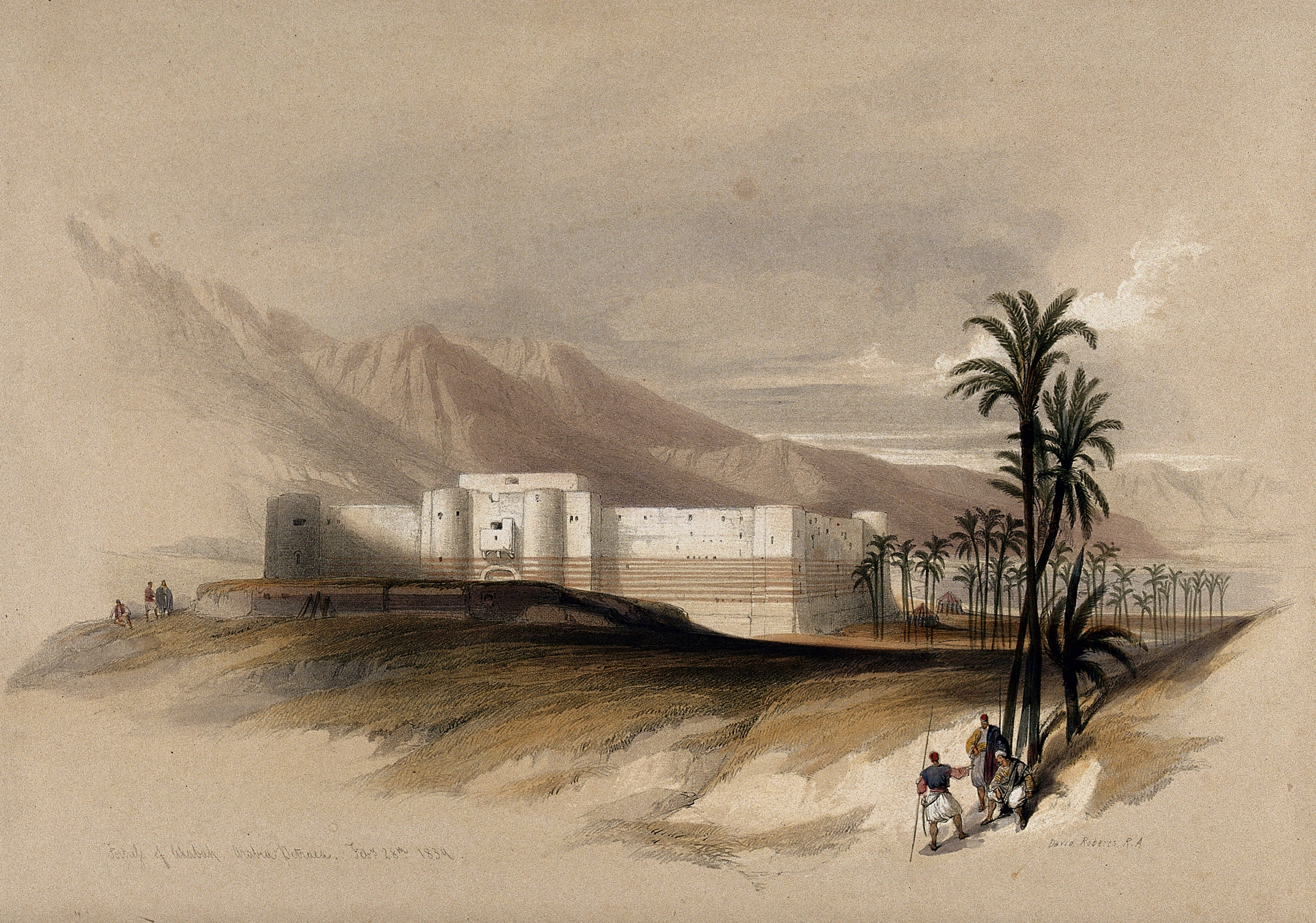
1840s lithograph from The Holy Land, Syria, Idumea, Arabia, Egypt, and Nubia

== See also ==
- List of castles in Jordan
