= Aqaba Archaeological Museum =

Coordinates: 29°31′18″N 35°00′05″E

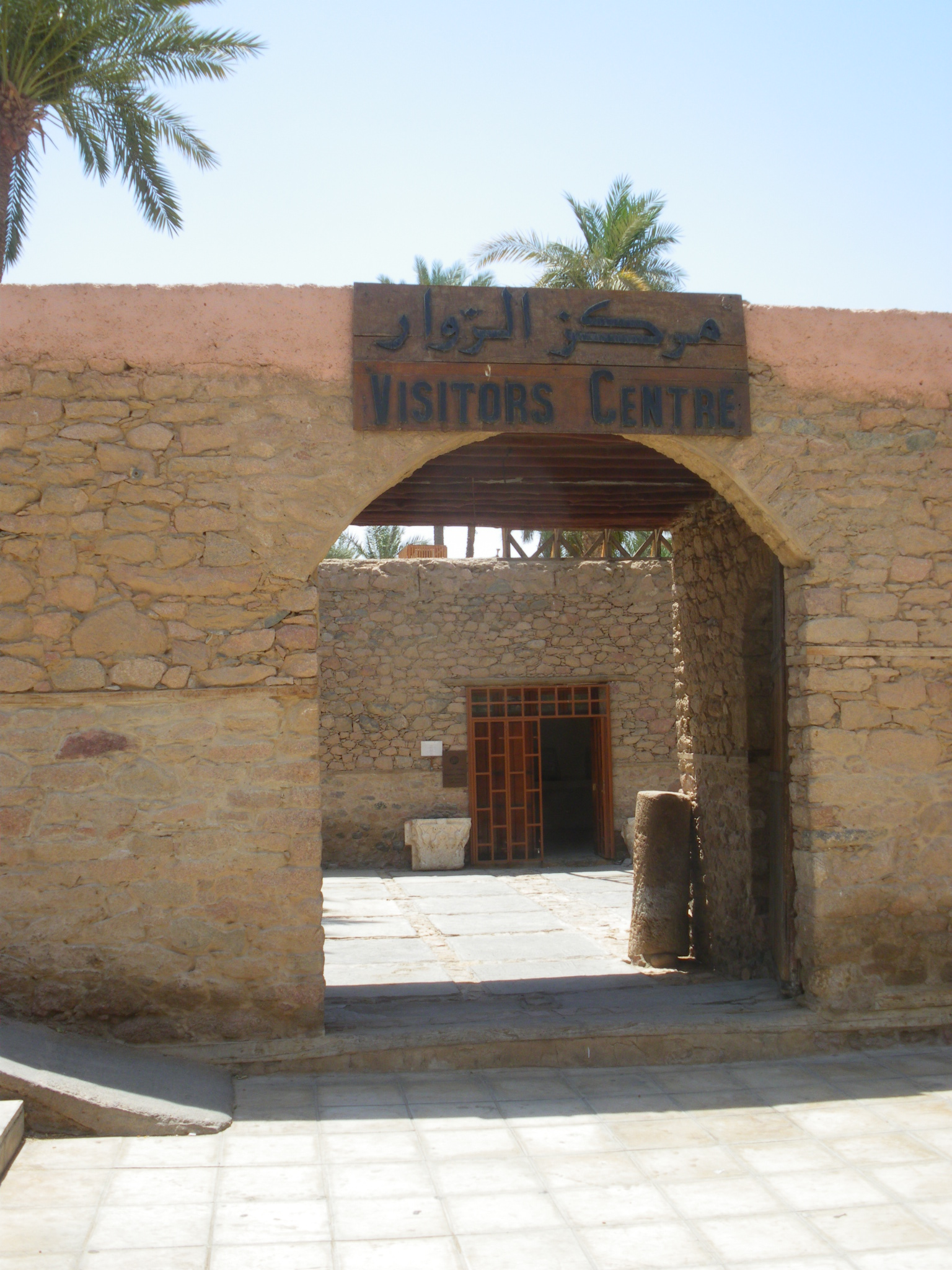
- Established: 1989
- Location: Aqaba, Jordan
- Type: National museum

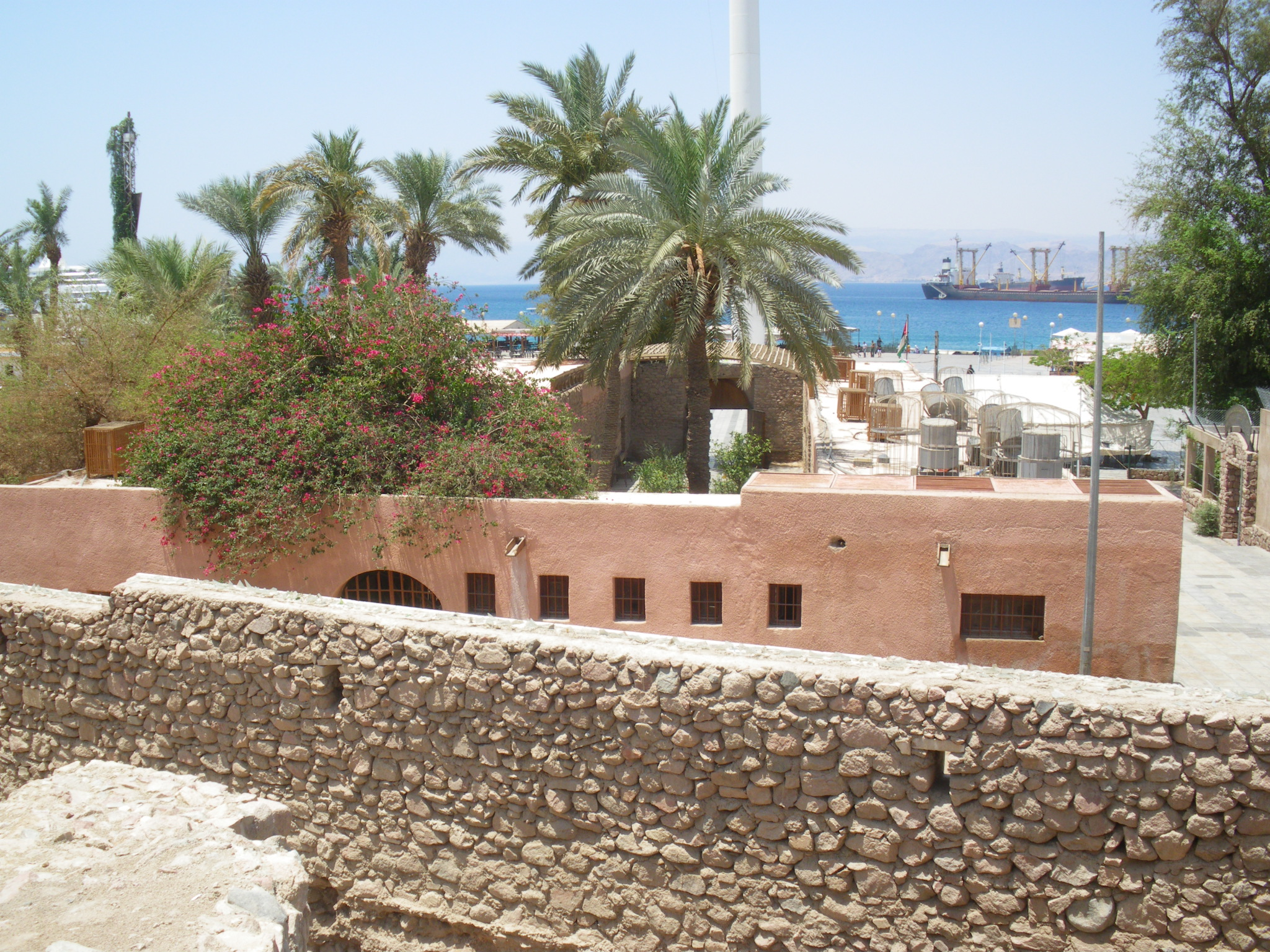
Rear view of the outside of the museum

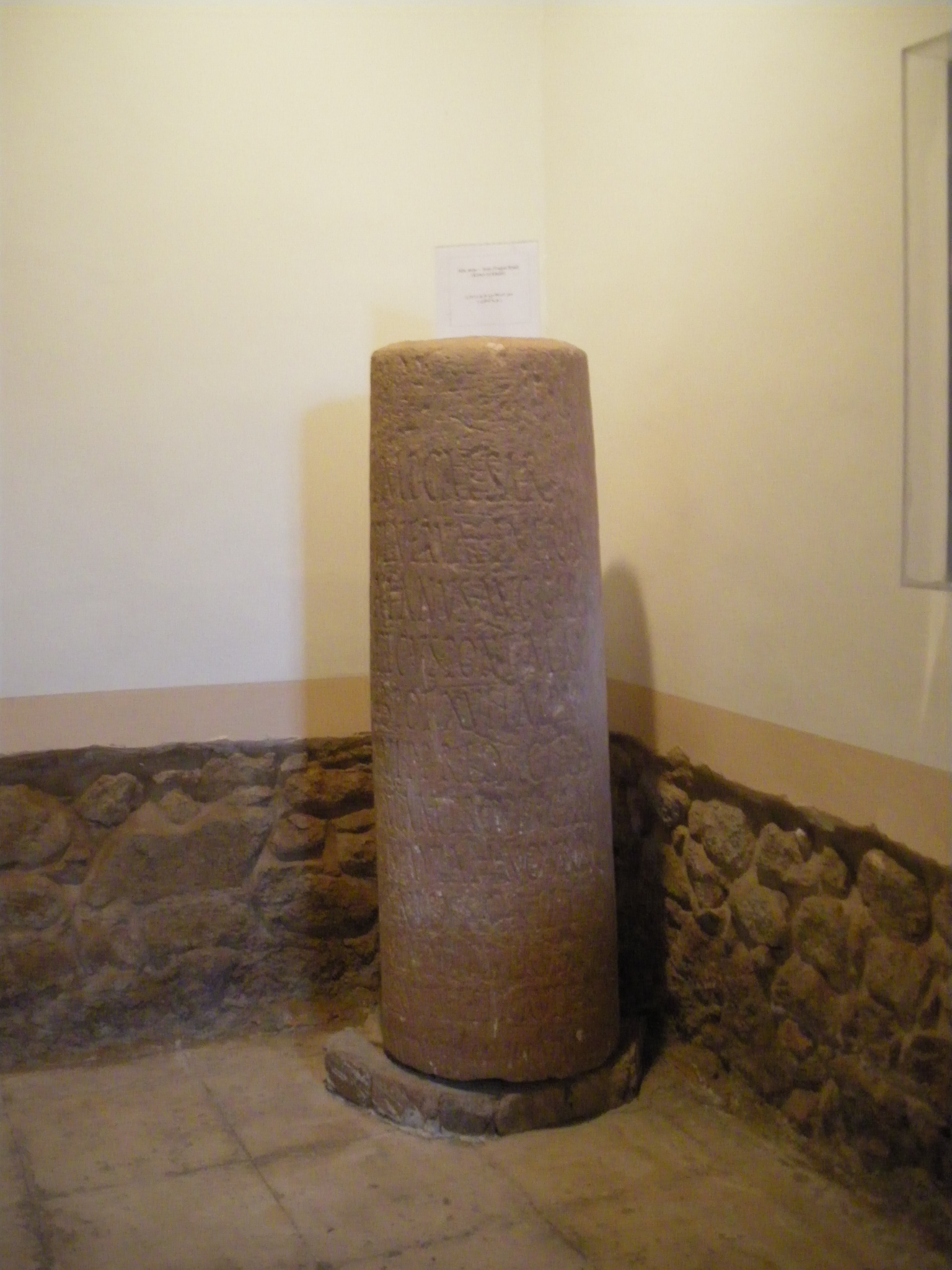
The milestone number 1 of the historic Via Traiana Nova Levantine trade route

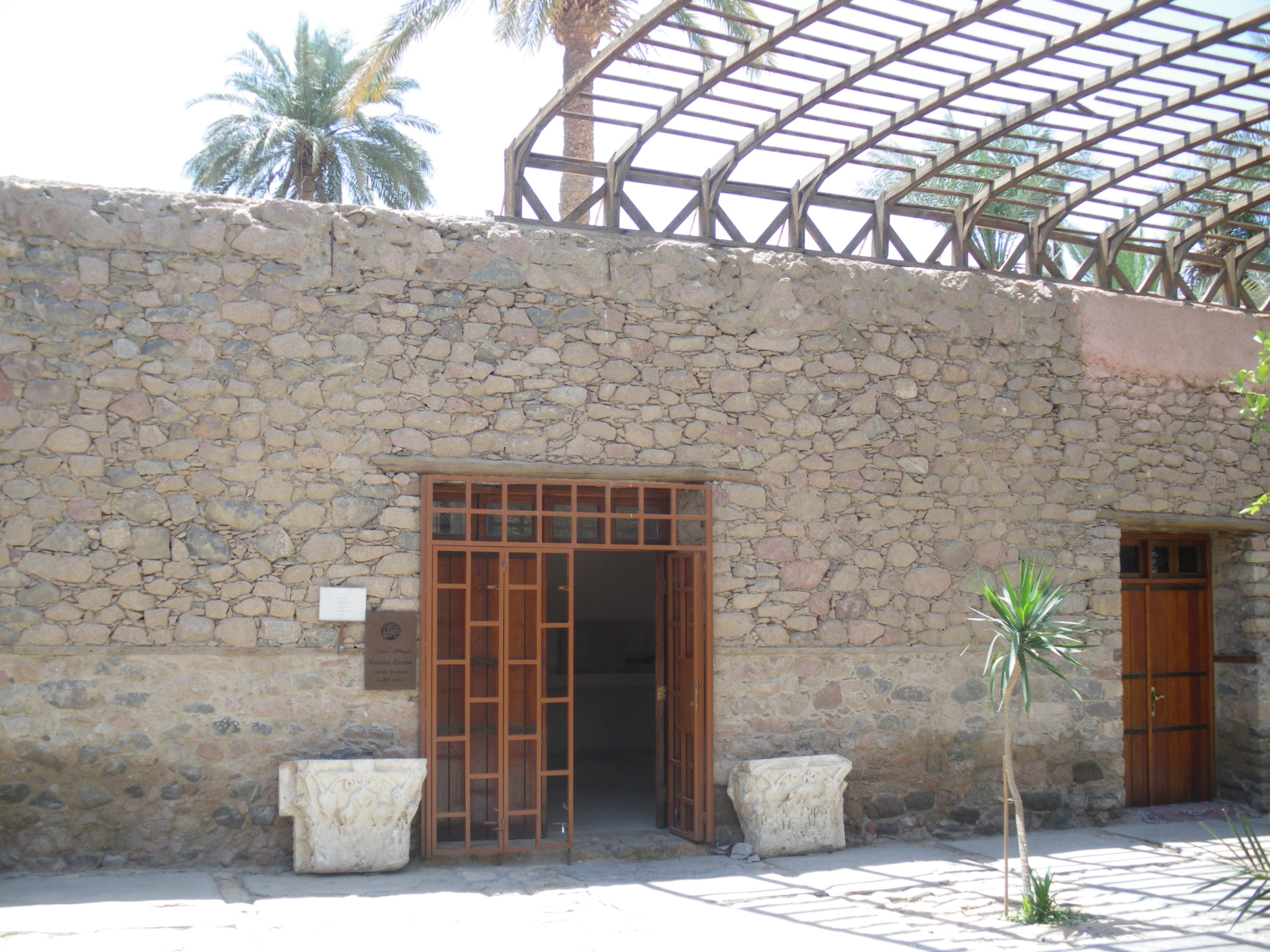
The museum was originally built to be the palace of Sharif Hussein Bin Ali in 1917

Aqaba Archaeological Museum (Arabic: متحف آثار العقبة, romanized: Matḥaf ʾĀthār al-ʿAqaba) is the official archaeological museum of the city of Aqaba in Jordan.

== Location ==
The museum is located in the historical part of Aqaba, adjacent to the historic fort of Aqaba and near the Aqaba Flagpole on the shores of the Red Sea.

== History ==
The building that hosts the museum was the palace of Sharif Hussein Bin Ali, the founder of the Hashemite dynasty, and was built shortly after World War I in 1917. The building was acquired by the Ministry of Tourism and Antiquities in 1979, previously owned by local government. The museum was established in 1989 and was officially opened on January 1, 1990.

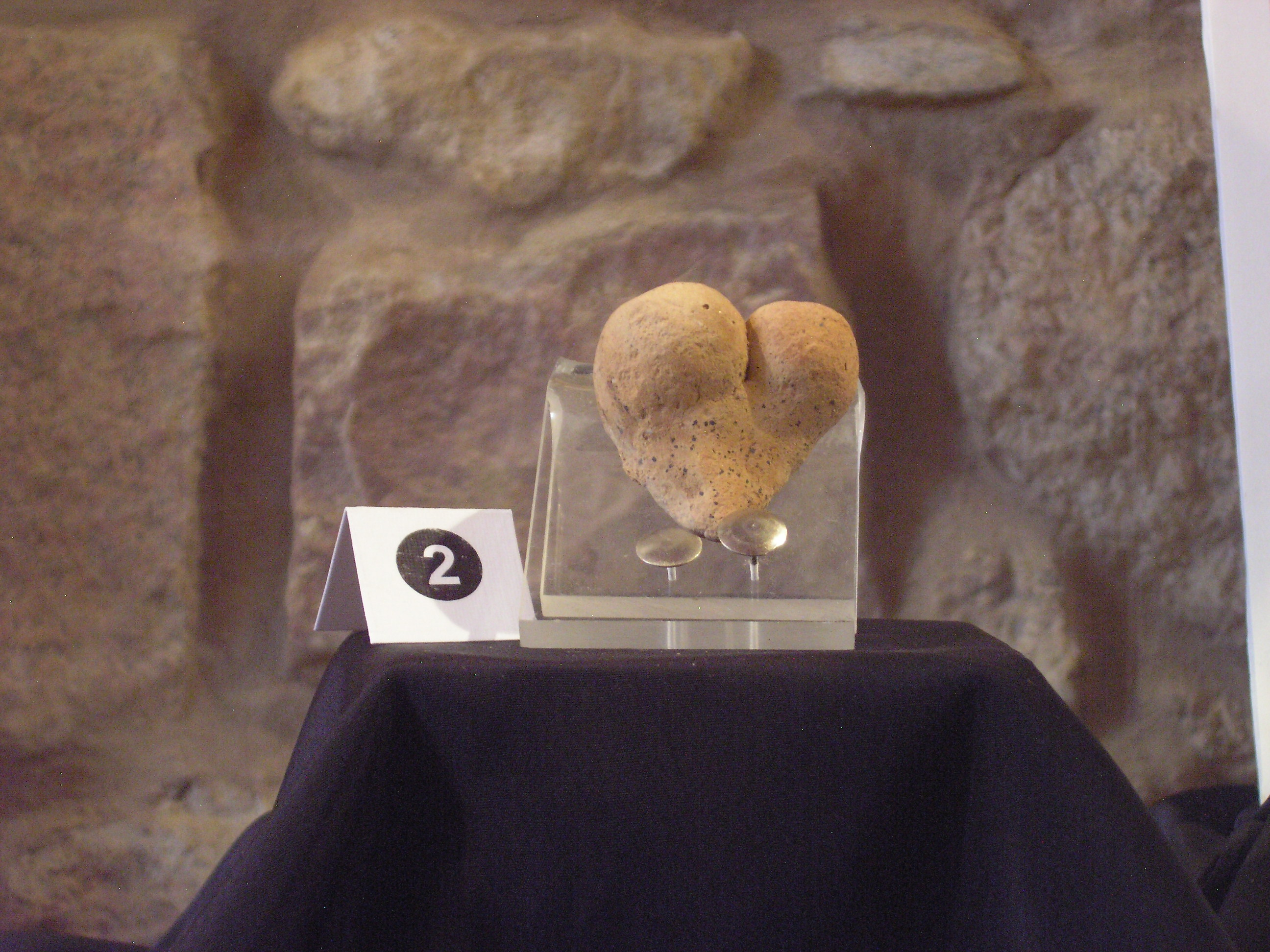
The "Lady of Aqaba" artifact discovered in Tall Hujayrat Al-Ghuzlan and displayed in the museum.

== Collection ==
The museum houses Bronze Age artifacts that were recently discovered in the Tall Hujayrat Al-Ghuzlan archaeological site near Aqaba, dating back to 4000 BC. The discovery of the Tall Hujayrat al-Ghuzlan settlement provides an important proof that Aqaba is one of the oldest continuous settlements in the region that had a vibrant copper production. The museum also houses a collection of artifacts from the 7th to the early 12th century AD.

Some of the most known pieces of the museum's collections include a large inscription of a Quranic verse that was hanging on top of the eastern gate of the city in the 9th century, as well as golden coins that date back to the Fatimides and other coins from the kingdom of Segelmasa in Morocco.
