= Nebekian culture =

Early Epipalaeolithic archaeological culture of the Southern Levant

- Geographical range: Southern Levant
- Period: Early Epipalaeolithic
- Dates: c. 23000 BC – c. 17000 BC
- Preceded by: Levantine Aurignacian
- Followed by: Nizzanian culture Mushabian culture

The Nebekian culture is an Early Epipalaeolithic archaeological culture of the Southern Levant, dating to around 25,000 to 19,000 years ago. It is roughly contemporaneous with the Kebaran culture, but is distinguished by the use of different types of microlithic tools, especially microburins. The Nebekian is also usually found in the eastern steppes and deserts of the region, as opposed to the Kebaran, which is centred on the Mediterranean coast. Most Nebekian sites were small camps occupied by hunter-gatherers for a short period of time; they include Uwaynid 14, Uwaynid 18, KPS-75, Wadi Madamagh, and 'Ayn Qasiyya.
