= Basta, Astrakhan Oblast =

Basta Баста
- Selo
- Location within Astrakhan Oblast Location within Russia
- Coordinates: 45°47′N 47°30′E
- Country: Russia
- Region: Astrakhan Oblast
- District: Limansky District
- Time zone: UTC+4:00

Basta (Russian: Баста) is a rural locality (a selo) in Limansky District, Astrakhan Oblast, Russia. The population was 29 as of 2010. There are 2 streets.

== Geography ==
Basta is located 24 km east of Liman (the district's administrative centre) by road. Olya is the nearest rural locality.
