= Khirbat Iskandar =

Archaeological site in central Jordan

Khirbat Iskandar is an archaeological site in central Jordan. The name translates as "ruins of Alexander [the Great]," which references a nearby village. Though the original name of the site is not known, the site is known for its Early Bronze Age settlement, which is millennia before the time of Alexander the Great. The site itself is an example of archaeological finds of the first known human cities and their rise, growth, and collapse. The site was known as a Canaanite settlement, during a time where human writing was first discovered.

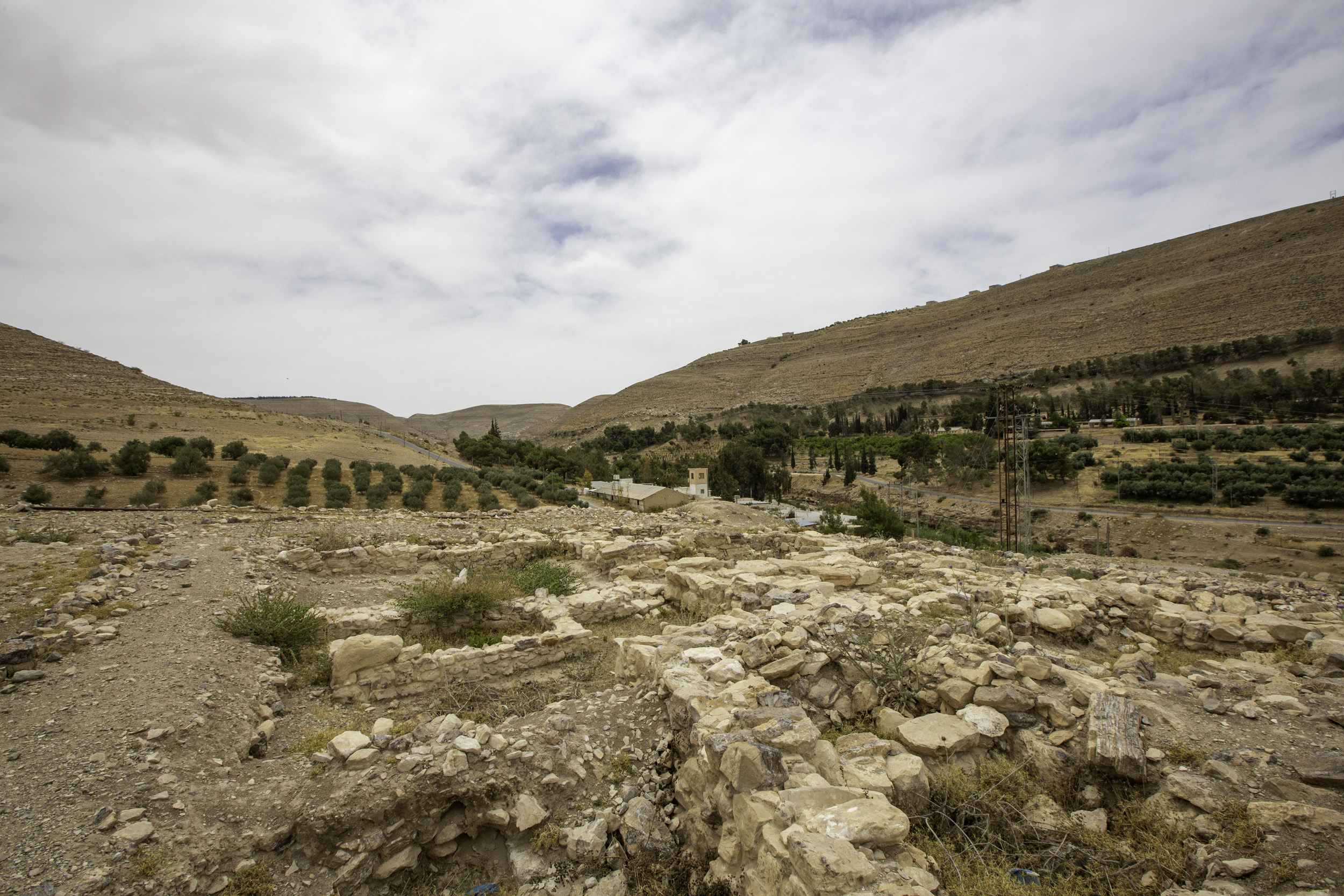
Picture of the site taken by photographer Bashar Tabbah.

The site is located south of Madaba and east of the Dead Sea, on the banks of Wadi el Wala, a perennial river and important source of water for the upcoming urban settlements. It is a site on the famous ancient trade route called the "King's Highway." The sites significance also lies in its role in the development of human societies from small groups of hunter-gatherers into more complex, stratified societies. The cite works closely with the American Center for Oriental Research (ACOR) in Amman, Jordan, as well as with Jordan's Department of Antiquities. The cite has been excavated nine time since 2016, also from 1982, 1984, 1987, 1997, 2000, 2004, 2010, and 2013.

== Layout and Findings ==
Archaeologist Nelson Glueck is often seen as the first to authoritatively study the cite during the Early Bronze Age settlements.

According to archaeologists at the Khirbat Iskandar dig, there was a transition to include non-urban societies, likely in the EB III/IV period, co-existing within and outside of a walled and gated city. In the walled city there is a gate, a corridor and steps, as well as stone benches. The site includes a courtyard, a storage room, and likely a kitchen.

There is evidence of common rooms, bedrooms, and kitchens. Part of the city includes a tabun oven and adjacent grain-milling and cooking rooms that was probably used as a food-milling or cooking station. In the city there was a place where bronze knives and other tools were manufactured. A particular blade made of flint was manufactured, that was believed to be used in tandem with a sickle tool to cut and harvest grain. It is referred to sometimes as a "Canaanean blade."

The site is unique because partly due to its fortifications, many of which were periodically re-built, it was a relatively long-lasting and continuously inhabited city. However, archaeologists at Gannon University have mentioned that Khirbat Iskandar during the Early Bronze Age IV is example of interaction between semi-nomadic populations and more sedentary, agricultural communities. It was previously believed that the city became semi-nomadic because of the city being invaded and destroyed by other traveling nomads. This is likely not true. Archaeologist Suzanne Richard, a fellow at the American Center for Oriental Research (ACOR) in Amman, Jordan characterizes the EB IV period as one of a complex mix of post-urban, rural life, but also nomadism. She argues that a new reading of the EB IV settlements complicate the narrative about the fall of cities: namely, the continuity of urbanism in Syria, and its relationship with maritime trade in Egypt, in the post EB III period.

According to the American Center for Oriental Research, the latest findings are quite embryonic and not fully developed, but they chart archaeologists on the path of the complicated history of semi-urban, semi-rural life in the EB III and IV eras. Their blog argues that the layout of the site "raises serious questions" about the reductive use of the term "pastoral-nomadism" to describe the final Early Bronze Age period. The blog also argues that "radiocarbon modeling techniques" of the cite raise questions about how archaeologists date and periodize the transition from the Early Bronze Age III to IV, and the complex bases of human economies within them. The floodplain of the site was believed to be destroyed, accounting for its decline at the end of the EB IV.
