= Tell el-Fukhar (Jordan) =

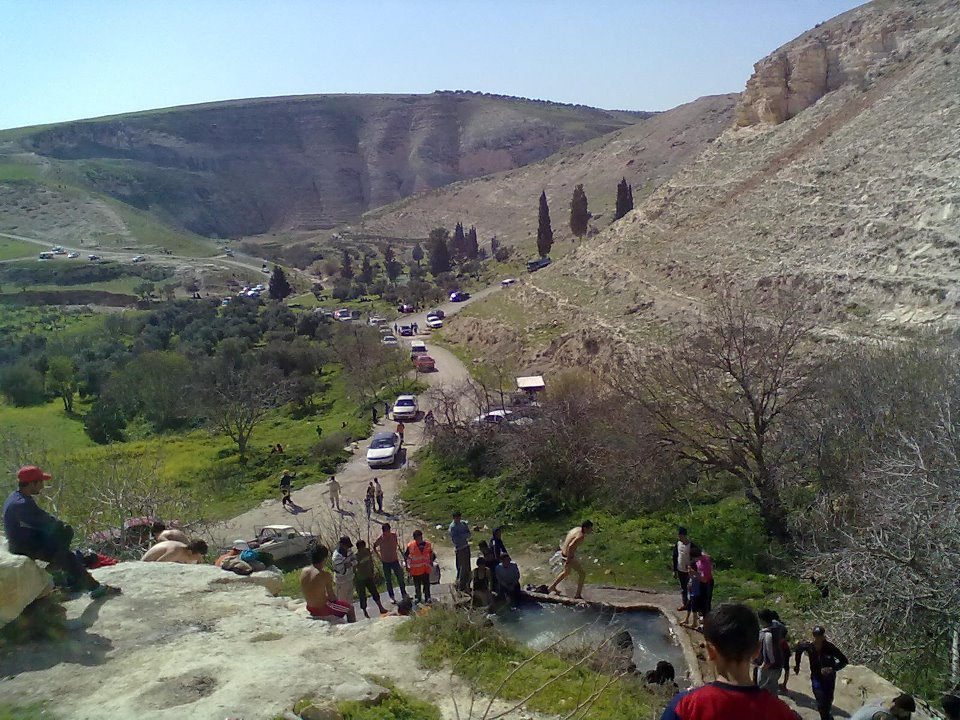

Tell el-Fukhar is a multi-period site spanning the early Bronze Age to the Roman Period Tell el-Fukhar, located between Irbid and Ramtha in Wadi Shella in Jordan. The name "Tell el-Fukhar" is Arabic for "mound of potsherds," a testament to the history of looting at the site.

== History ==
Tell el-Fukhar is a multi-period site with archaeological evidence showing occupation during the Early Bronze Age, Late Bronze Age/Early Iron Age, Persian Empire and Hellenistic Period. Additionally, there is evidence of Roman period looting and squatting at the site.

=== Early Bronze Age ===
In Early Bronze IB (c. 3300/3250-3050/3000 BCE), Tell el-Fukhar was settled.

In Early Bronze II-III (c. 3000-2350 BCE), Tell el-Fukhar was became a walled city. There was a nearby "suburb" on Khirbet Zeraqoun.

At the end of EB IIIB (c. 2350/2300 BCE), the city was abandoned or destroyed. In EB IV, only squatters were on the tell.

=== Middle Bronze Age ===
In the Middle Bronze Age, there was only squatters on the acropolis.

=== Late Bronze Age ===
In the Late Bronze I, during the Egyptian domination of Palestine, Tell el-Fukhar was settled again. In the Late Bronze II B period, it was an important center with a large palace on the "acropolis" and a heavy city wall with a gate. At the end of the LBA (c. 1200 BCE) it was abandoned.

Archaeological remains found at el-Fukhar include a Late Bronze Age II cooking pot which, analysis shows, came from the Region of Gaza. This is evidence of extensive trade networks between Tell el-Fukhar and other regional trade centers.

Numerous houses have been investigated, as well as the discovery of a monumental public building built between 1450BC and 1300BC, during the LB IB-IIB period, which was destroyed during a period of wide-scale destruction at the end of the period. "Late Bronze/early Iron Age fortifications, domestic and probable palatial installations, and a single Philistine krater rim sherd" have also been found.

=== Iron Age ===
In Iron IIC (c. 600-300 BCE), the acropolis was surrounded by a wall (80x100 m).

== Modern times ==
Historic, unassociated finds are also located in the area, included humain remains originating from "a fight between bedawins and townsmen in 1931."

Looting is occurring and has occurred at the site historically. Activities associated with looting artifacts from the Iron Age to the Hellenistic Period have been archaeologically documented through the preservation of "numerous robber trenches, pits, and possibly fills which contained great numbers of ceramics". The site continues to be at significant risk from modern looting.

== Sources ==
- Strange, J. 1997. "Tall al-Fukhar 1990-91 (sic): A Preliminary Report." Studies in the History and Archaeology of Jordan VI: 399-406.
- ACOR Jordan
