= Bastar =

Bastar may refer to:

- Bastar State, a state founded in the 15th-century that later became a princely state of British India
- Bastar district, an administrative district of Chhattisgarh state in central India
- Bastar division, an administrative division of Chhattisgarh that includes Bastar, Dantewada, and Kanker districts
- Bastar (Lok Sabha constituency), a parliamentary constituency in Chhattisgarh state in central India
- Bastar (Vidhan Sabha constituency), a state assembly constituency within the Parliamentary constituency
- Bastar rebellion, rebellion in colonial India
- Bastar: The Naxal Story, a 2024 Indian film about the Naxalite–Maoist insurgency in Bastar district

== See also ==
- Zall-Bastar, a village and a former municipality in Tirana County, central Albania
- Bastard (disambiguation)
