= Basta, Jordan =

Basta بسطة
- Location within Jordan
- Coordinates: 30°14′N 35°32′E
- Country: Jordan
- Governorate: Ma'an Governorate
- Elevation: 1,460 m (4,790 ft)

Basta (Arabic: بسطة, romanized: Basṭa) is a village in Ma'an Governorate, southern Jordan. It is located about 36 kilometres (22 mi) southeast of Petra, at an altitude of 1,460 metres (4,790 ft). As of 2012, it had a population of 1,491 people, compared to 461 in the 1961 census.

The village gives its name to a nearby archaeological site, the ruins of a prehistoric settlement dating to around 7000 BCE and one of earliest known places in the world that had a settled population who practised agriculture.
