= KPS-75 =

Early Epipalaeolithic archaeological site in Karak, Jordan

KPS-75 is an archaeological site near Al-Karak in Jordan. It is a rock shelter on the northern edge of the Wadi al-Hasa basin, which was occupied by humans at least three times during the Early Epipalaeolithic period (c. 25,000–19,000 BP). Stone tools found at the site are associated with the Nebekian and Qalkhan cultures. During the time the site was occupied, a small seasonal lake was located nearby, and its inhabitants mostly hunted gazelle, along with smaller numbers of equids, aurochs, wild goats, tortoises, hares, and birds.
