= Tall Al-Magass =

Archaeological site in Jordan

Tall Al-Magass is an archaeological site dating to the Chalcolithic period that lies north of modern-day Aqaba city in Jordan. Tall Al-Magass and the neighboring Tall Hujayrat Al-Ghuzlan site, also north of Aqaba, both have extensive evidence of significant copper production and trade in the region.
