= Dhuweila =

Archaeological site in eastern Jordan

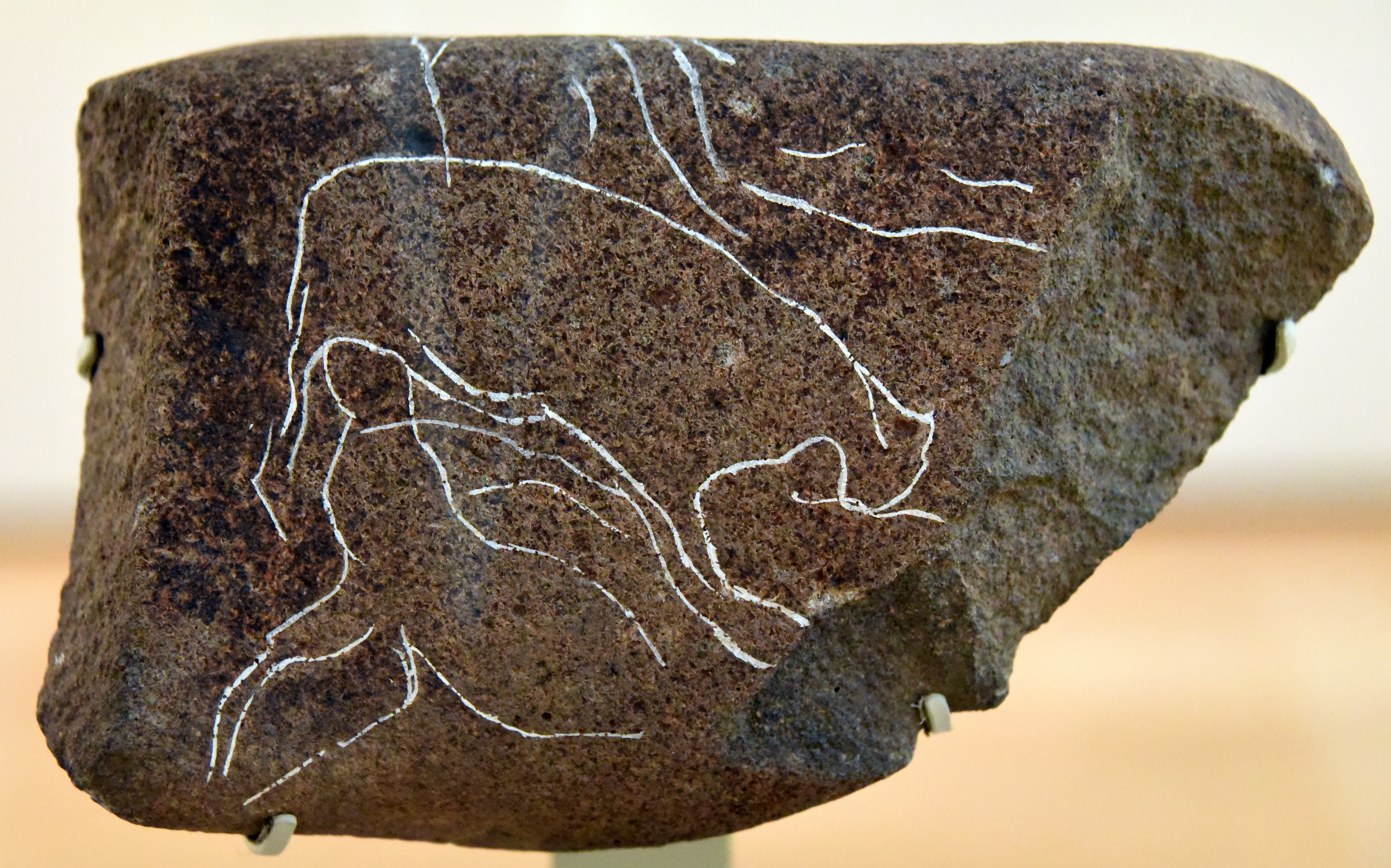
Basalt stone incised with a scene showing two animals, probably gazelles. From Dhuweila, c. 6200 BCE. British Museum

Dhuweila is an archaeological site in the Badia of eastern Jordan. It contains the remains of a small hunting camp, which was first built and occupied in the Early Neolithic and reoccupied, after a hiatus, in the Late Neolithic. The Early Neolithic occupation dates to between 7360 and 7080 BCE.

The site was sporadically revisited in later periods. One of these episodes, dating to the Chalcolithic or Early Bronze Age (c. 4450–3000 BCE), is notable for leaving some of the earliest known traces of cotton fabric in the world.

The site was first recorded by Alison Betts in 1981, and excavated in 1983 and 1986.

== Later occupations and early cotton ==
In the millennia following the abandonment of the Late Neolithic settlement, Dhuweila was occasionally revisited by nomadic Bedouin, presumably because of the shelter offered by the prehistoric ruins. One of these visits left behind several fragments of lime plaster containing impressions of woven cloth. Microscopic fibres recovered from these pieces were identified as domestic cotton and directly dated to the Chalcolithic or Early Bronze Age (c. 4450–3000 BCE). At that time, cotton was not widespread, and must have been imported from either Nubia or the Indus Valley. Betts and colleagues conclude that it was probably brought to the site as scraps of waste fabric acquired from villages elsewhere, indicating the long-distance connections North Arabian nomads had with other cultures at the time. The remains from Dhuweila were the earliest known evidence of cotton fabric until 2002, when earlier examples were discovered at Mehrgarh in Pakistan.

Nomads also left many Safaitic inscriptions in the vicinity of Dhuweila, dating to the 1st century BCE to the 4th century CE. One alludes to a conflict between local tribes and the Nabataeans:

l-ḥls bn mlk w-r^{c}y f-tẓr h-mẓr f-hrḍy ġnmt m-nbṭ [w]^{c}qbt

—Dhuweila Inscription No. 8

By ḥls son of mlk and he grazed [the animals], and waited [on] the watching tower. Ô Radhy, (grant) booty and vengeance from the Nabataeans.

—translation (Alzoubi and Almaani 2018)
