= Ba'ja =

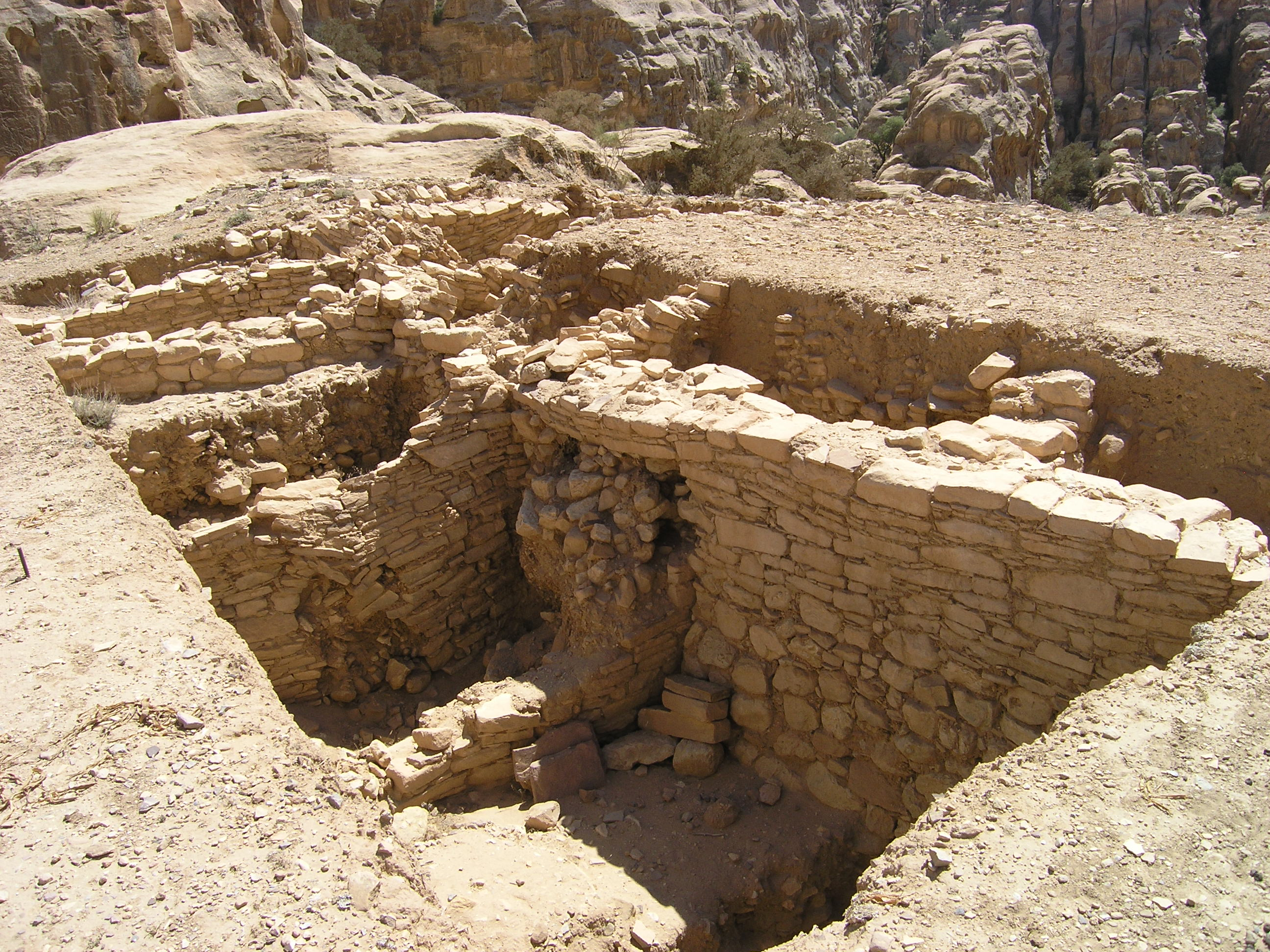
- Ba'ja, Excavation Area B

- Location of Ba'ja in Jordan
- 30°24′49″N 35°27′41″E
- Location: Jordan

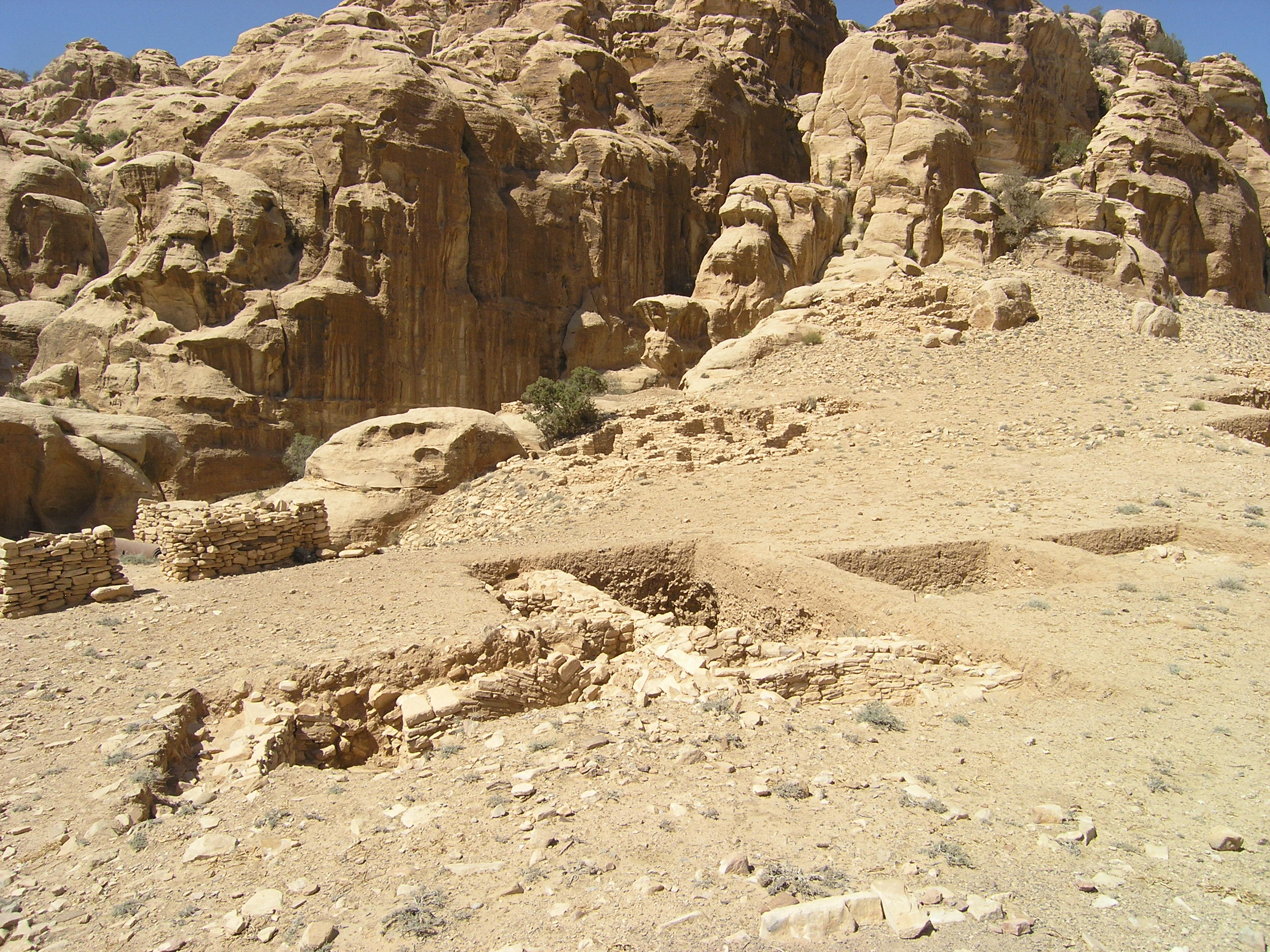
Areas B, E, and TU 2

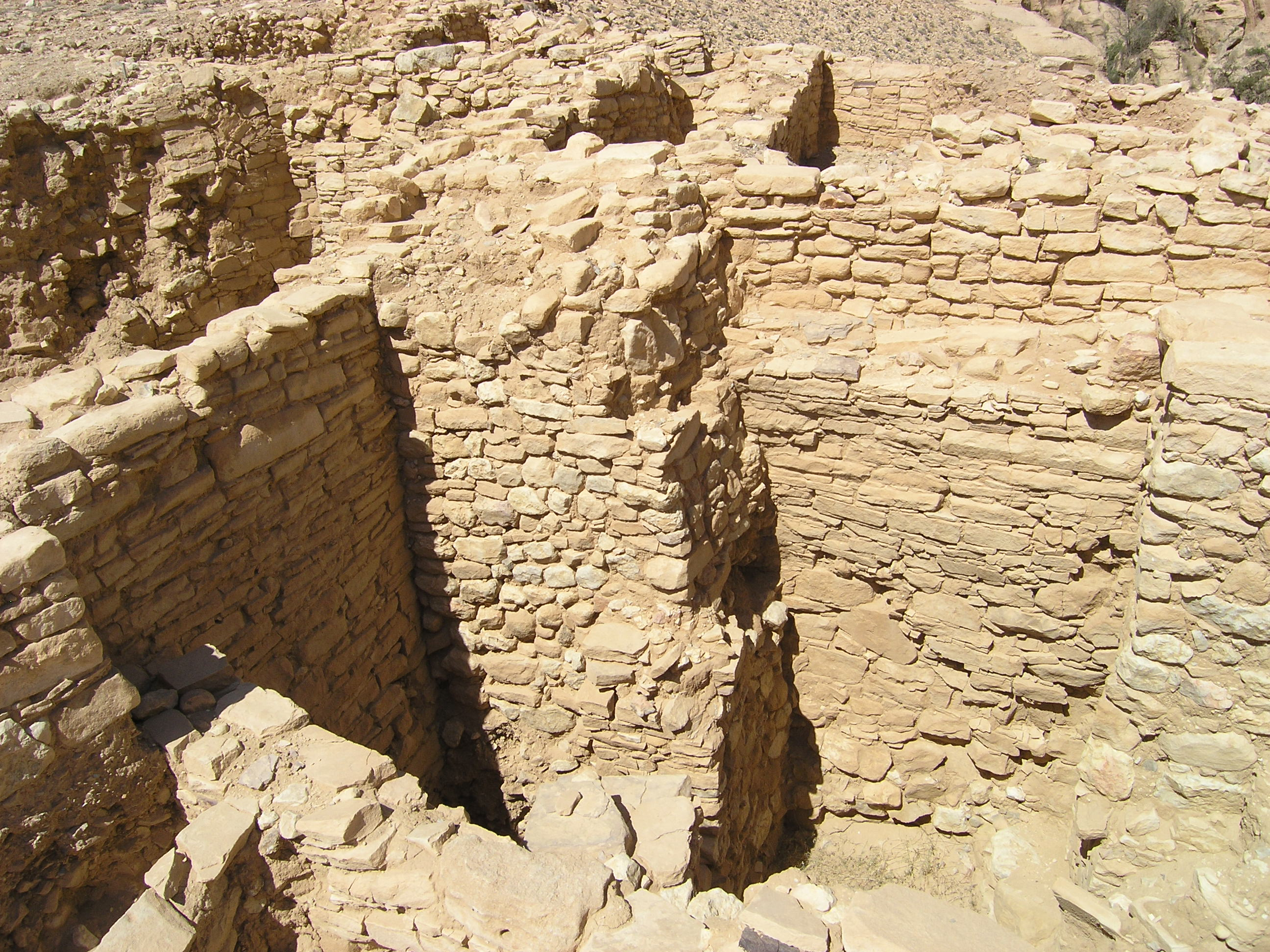
Walls in Area TU 2

Ba'ja (Arabic: بعجة) is a Neolithic village 14 kilometres (8.7 mi) north of Petra, Jordan. Like the nearby site of Basta, the settlement was built in c. 7000 BC, during the PPNB (Pre-Pottery Neolithic B) period. Ba'ja lies at an altitude of approximately 1,160 metres (3,810 ft), and is only accessible with a climbing route through a narrow, steep canyon. It is one of the largest neolithic villages in the Jordan area.

Near the entrance to the site is Ba'ja I, an Islamic settlement with 2-3 layers of an older Nabataean settlement.

== History ==
Little is known of the early inhabitants of the village, or to what people they belonged. The original name of the village is unknown. The current name of the site was applied to it by archaeologists and is derived from the nearby mountain range. The earliest written record attesting to the inhabitants of the region wherein Ba'ja lies is taken from the old Hebrew canonical books. There, it describes a certain people known as Ḥorites, who inhabited the general region. In the second millennium BCE they were joined by the descendants of Esau, b. Iṣaac b. Ibrāhīm, who intermarried with them and, eventually, supplanted them. By the time of the first century CE, the general region – which included Petra – had been settled by the Nabatæi.

== Houses ==
The maximum usable area of the hilltop settlement of Ba'ja, for which 600 inhabitants are presumed, was 1.2 to 1.5 hectares. For this reason, the houses were built up to the surrounding steep slopes (up to 45°) and close to each other. Many houses had more than one floor, with the floors connected by an internal staircase. The walls of the buildings were up to 4.20 meters thick. In addition, the houses usually had a basement. The houses had been renovated often, changing the settlement plan.

Numerous stone axes and stone bowls were buried ritually between the walls of the houses and under the floors. Human and animal remains were found in the same context.

== Ossuary ==
In a 0.6 m^{2} room with the remains of a wall painting in fresco technique showing abstract motifs and geometric figures, were the bones of three adults and nine small children in whom no diseases that led to their death could be detected. In the burials, which were not at the same time, the deceased was placed below the middle of the room and the bones from previous burials were pushed to the side. In the tomb, which was disturbed in the Neolithic period, numerous artificial pearls, nine arrowheads, a broken flint dagger, a mother-of-pearl ring, and another piece of mother-of-pearl jewelry have been found beneath the skull of a newborn. One burial of a young girl included an ornate necklace of multiple strands of beads of several types, a central pendant, and a carved clasp. Red ocher that caused the bones and finds to turn red was found throughout the tomb.

== Social structure and economy ==
A shallow hierarchy is presumed for Ba'ja, theoretically with decisions made by consensus of the family heads. The existence of a village chief cannot be ruled out.

Within the settlement area, many sandstone rings from local production have been found, which appear throughout central Jordan in this period and may have been an object of barter that may indicate a certain wealth of the place. Since such stone rings and their precursor products were found in all households, it may be presumed that their production was organized within families.

Food production was mainly through livestock husbandry and hunting, with furs from leopards, foxes, and the hyrax (Heterohyrax brucei) being numerous.
