= Kharaysin =

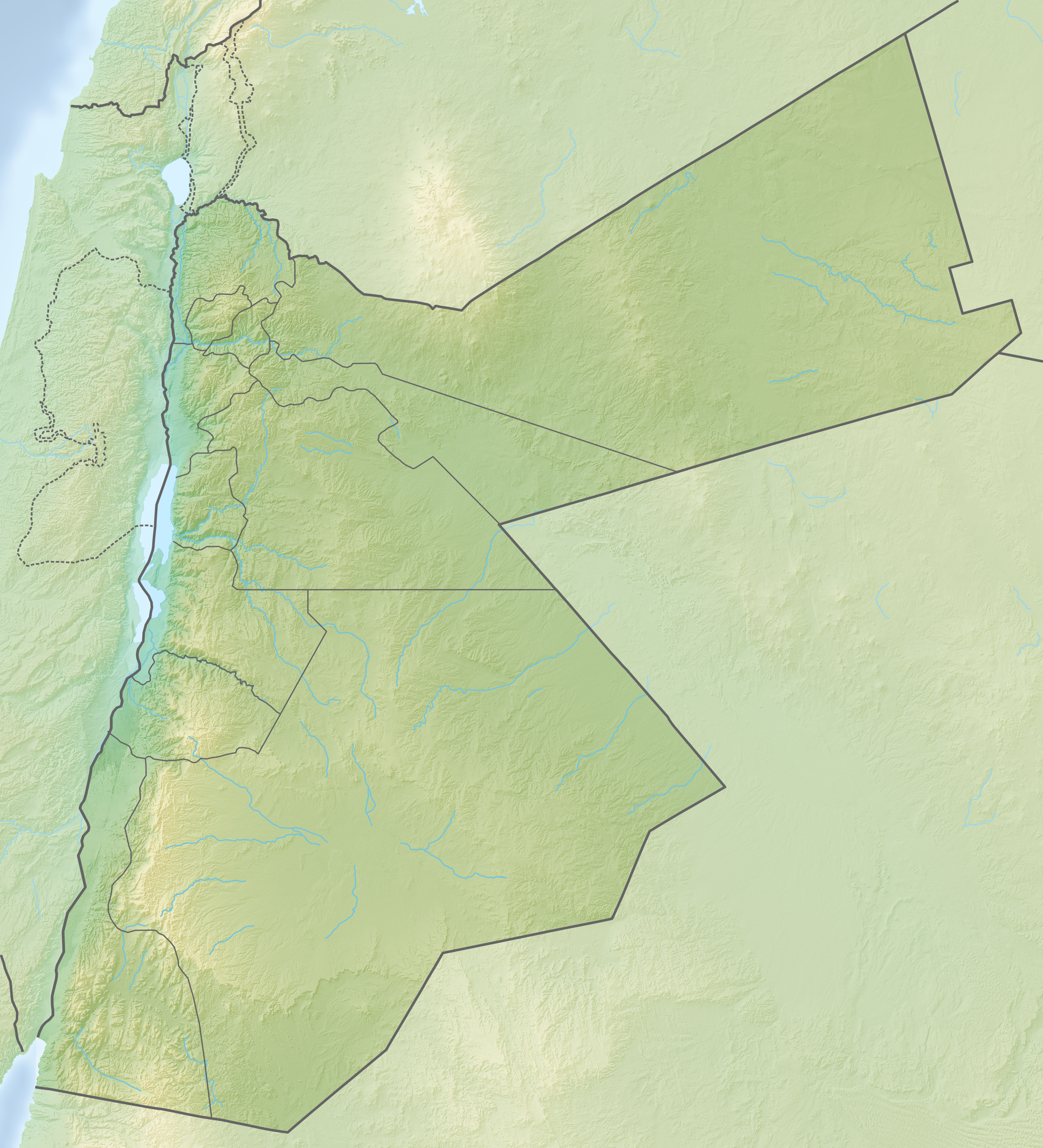
- Location within Near East Location within Jordan
- 32°12′14″N 36°0′32″E
- Periods: Neolithic, Bronze Age
- Location: Zarqa Governorate, Jordan

Kharaysin is a Pre-Pottery Neolithic site (PPN) located in the village of Quneya, at the Zarqa River valley, Jordan. This site was discovered in 1984 by Hanbury-Tenison and colleagues during the Jerash Region Survey. The site was allocated to the Pre-Pottery Neolithic B because of the analysis of archaeological artefacts recovered on the surface.

Kharaysin is a large settlement on a hillside that links the promontory of Mutawwaq and the right bank of the Zarqa River. It is located at the confluence of the Zarqa River with a small tributary river, the Wadi Kharaysin. At the top of the promontory is placed the Bronze Age site of Jebel al-Mutawwaq.

Since May 2014, a Spanish research team of the Spanish National Research Council, the University of Cantabria and the Pontifical Faculty of San Esteban in Salamanca has been carrying out archaeological works in the site that have been funded by the Ministry of Culture of Spain through its program of archaeological projects abroad.

== Excavations ==
=== Occupational levels; zones; architectural remains ===
The archaeological excavations have documented three zones with three main occupational levels dating from the Pre-Pottery Neolithic A (PPNA), at the end of the tenth millennium cal BC to the Middle Pre-Pottery at the beginning of the eighth millennium cal BC. The PPN site is interpreted as possibly having an extension of 25 ha with some areas being flat and others having zones with relatively steep slopes.

In one zone, two oval semi-sunken houses with plaster floors were excavated and dated from the beginning of the ninth millennium cal BC, the late phase of the PPNA. Over this architectural level, Middle Pre-Pottery Neolithic B (PPNB) occupation was also documented with straight stone walls and burials.

In another zone, there are several squared houses with rounded corners and central fireplaces from the second half of the ninth millennium cal BC, during the Early PPNB. There is another occupational level under the Early PPNB remains dated during the last phase of the PPNA.

In the third zone, excavators have documented two squared houses with lime plastered floors arranged in a parallel relationship to one another.

=== Material culture ===
The archaeological material recovered in the excavation was reported as varied and abundant. Bipolar technology, Amuq, Byblos, and Jericho points as well as bent sickle blades were observed in the Middle PPNB occupation phase. Jericho points are more common, followed by those of the Byblos and Amuq type. The PPNA material culture remains poorly documented.

A study published in July 2020 described flint artefacts that could be human figurines, from the Middle PPNB found at Kharaysin.

=== Mortuary practices ===
The archaeological work has revealed primary and secondary burials and skull caches. The practice of skull removal is documented along with the retrieval of other bone elements. This body manipulation was widespread during the PPN in the Levant.
