= Tall Hujayrat Al-Ghuzlan =

Archaeological site in Jordan

Coordinates: 29.5663°N 35.0341°E

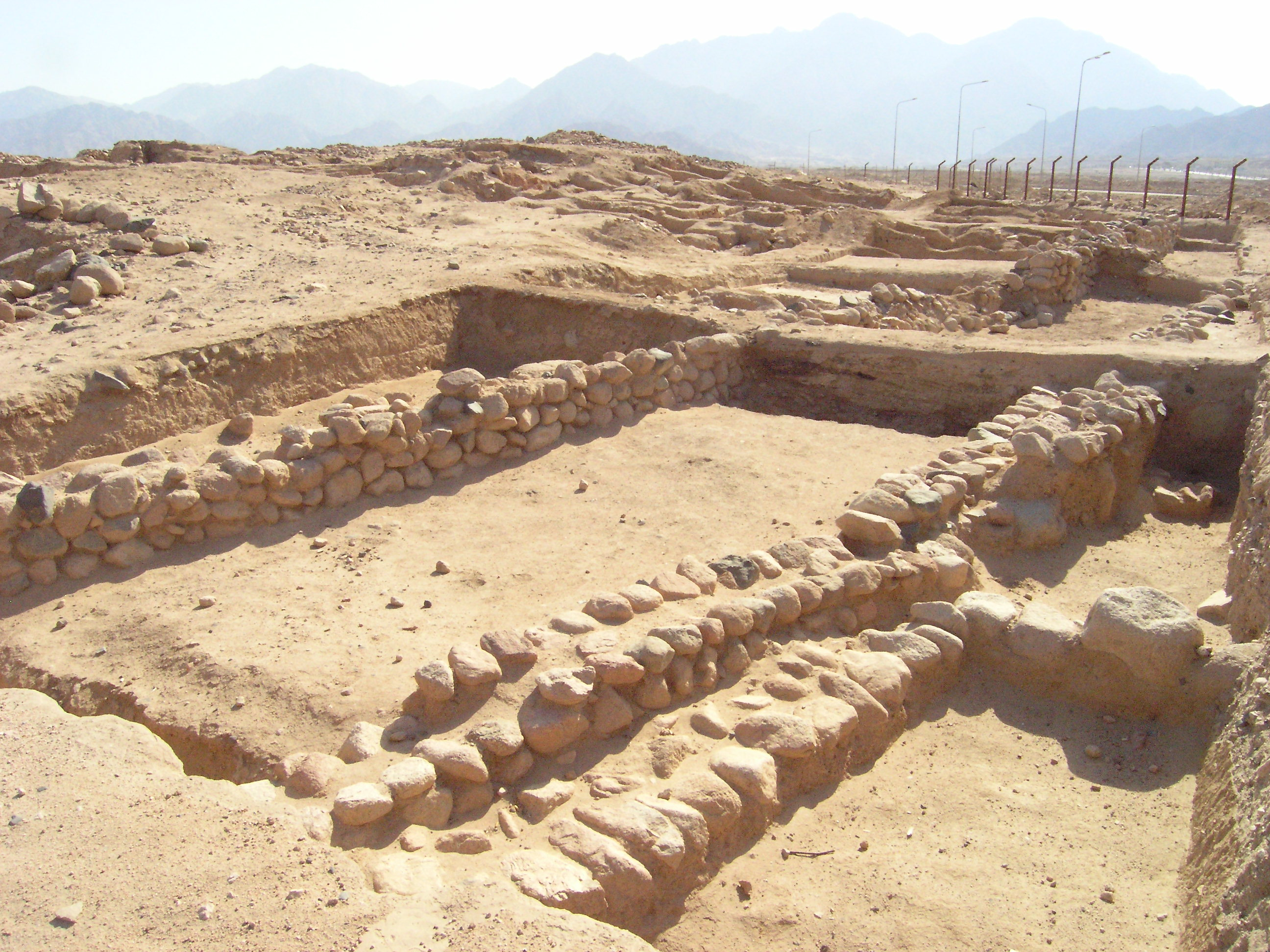
View of the site

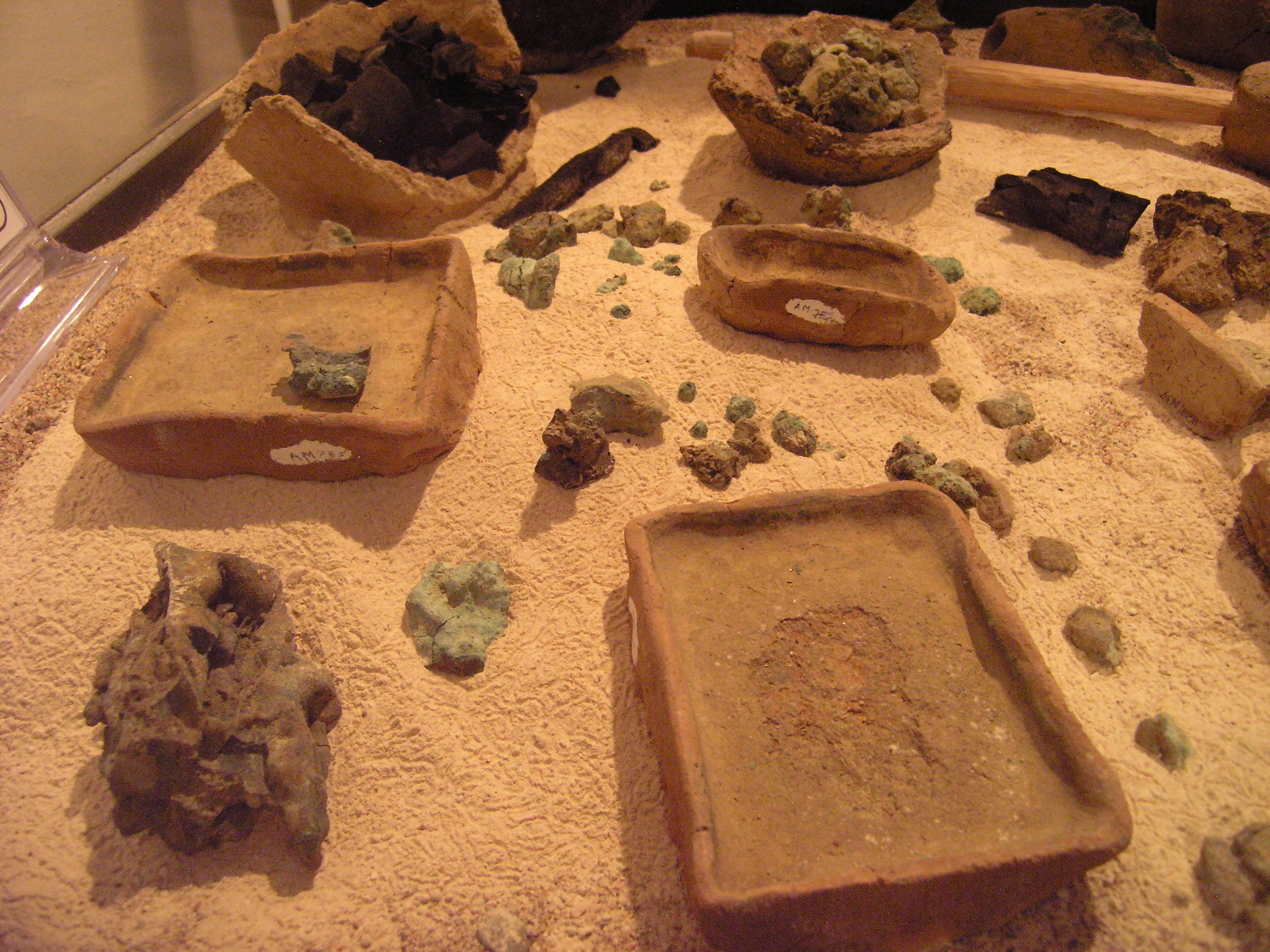
Archaeological discoveries from the site on display at the Aqaba Archaeological Museum

Tall Hujayrat Al-Ghuzlan is an archaeological site during the Chalcolithic period that lies 4 km north of modern-day Aqaba city in Jordan. Tall Hujayrat Al-Ghuzlan and the neighboring Tall Al-Magass site in Aqaba both have extensive evidence of significant copper production and trade in the region.

== Overview ==
Archaeologists from University of Jordan discovered the site. They found human and animal depictions on the walls of a building, suggesting a religious site. The people who inhabited the site had developed an extensive water system for irrigating their crops (mostly grapes and wheat). Searchers also uncovered several different-sized clay pots, suggesting that copper production was a major industry in the region (the pots were possibly used in melting the copper and reshaping it). Scientific studies performed onsite revealed that it had undergone two earthquakes, with the latter one leaving the site completely destroyed.
