= 'Uyun al-Hammam =

Archaeological site in Jordan

- عيون الحمام (Arabic)
- Uyun al-Hammam
- Location within Jordan
- 32°30′28″N 35°42′9″E
- Type: Burial site
- Periods: Upper Paleolithic in the Levant
- Cultures: pre-Natufian 16,500 BP
- Location: Irbid, Jordan

Site notes
- Height: 221 metres (725 ft) above sea level
- Excavation dates: 2005–present

'Uyun al-Hammam is a prehistoric burial site in Jordan from the Middle Epipalaeolithic period of Levantine history. It is the earliest known formal burial site in the Middle East, and is possibly the oldest in the world. Remains at the c. 16,500-year-old pre-Natufian burial site, located in Wadi Ziqlab, were first discovered in 2000. Significantly, the site provides some of the earliest-known evidence for human-animal companionship and burial traditions in the Levant.

== Discoveries ==
The site covers approximately 1,500 square metres (16,000 ft^{2}) and is linked to the Geometric Kebaran culture. Seven graves were excavated in 2005, with one being further excavated and another being discovered in a follow-up 2008 excavation. Excavations at the site revealed the interred remains of at least eleven people. The graves had a mix of primary and secondary burials in addition to showing evidence of reuse of graves. Grave goods discovered at the site included flint tools, red ochre, and animal bones.

A red fox was discovered to have been interred together with a human at the site. Its remains were buried in such a manner as to suggest that prehistoric humans in that locale may have kept foxes as companion animals, in a similar way to dogs. The find provides information on the earliest burial practices of ancient humans. Notably, both the human and red fox were initially buried in one of the graves, and then were moved together to another grave.

The living space around the burial site was a well-used campsite, suggesting that despite the pre-Natufian culture being nomadic, they still had ritual and practical ties to particular locations.

Higher layers of the excavation revealed some Byzantine-period artifacts, suggesting the construction of field walls or other structures on the same site during the Byzantine era.
