= Kharaneh IV =

Paleolithic archaeological site

Coordinates: 31°43′25.5″N 36°27′16″E

Kharaneh IV (or Kharaneh 4) is an archaeological site in Jordan. The site contains evidence of human activity dating to the Late Pleistocene. Its main period of occupation was 18,900 to 16,600 BC.

Another archaeological site from around the same period, ʿAyn Qasiyya, is located approximately 37 kilometres (23 mi) east of Kharaneh IV.

== Description ==
Kharaneh IV is located in the Wadi Kharaneh near the town of Azraq, Jordan. It was first recorded by F. E. Zeuner in 1955. Excavations at the site began under M. Muheisen in the 1980s and were resumed in 2008 under the direction of Lisa Maher and Danielle Macdonald. In the 2010 field season, Maher's and Macdonald's team discovered two hut structures thought to be among the oldest habitation structures in the Levant. The site covers 21,000 square meters, and is the largest known Late Pleistocene site in the area.

Notably, the remains of two brushwood hut structures dating to the Early Epipalaeolithic period have been found at Kharaneh IV. Tools and large concentrations of ochre and marine shells have also been found at the site. A charcoal layer at the site suggests that the huts were burnt down after their abandonment. In addition, woman's remains dated back to 19,200 years ago were discovered at Kharaneh IV in 2016, which might have been cremated after being placed on top of a hut.

Remains of structures dating to the Middle Epipalaeolithic were also found at Kharaneh IV, consisting of a number of hearths that were used for cooking; evidence of flint knapping, or stone tool production, was also found at the site dating to this era.
