= Jan Bašta =

Czech engineer, writer and researcher

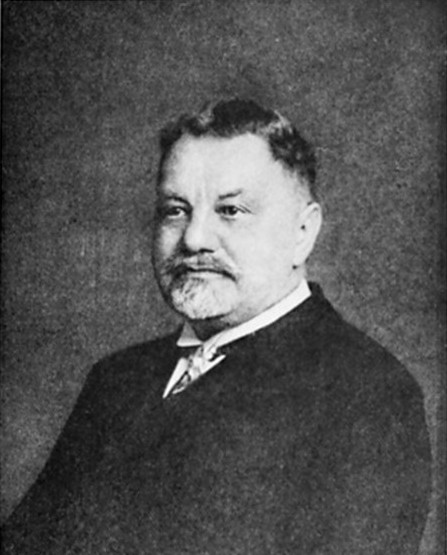
Jan Bašta

Jan Bašta (5 June 1860 in Poděbrady – 12 October 1936 in Prague) was a Czech engineer, writer and researcher. He became director of Czech railways in 1918.
