= Khirbat Nuqayb al-Asaymir =

Khirbat Nuqayb al-Asaymir (In Arabic means "Ruin of the Small Black Pass", abbreviated as KNA) is a Middle Islamic period (1000-1400 CE) archaeological site located at Faynan, southern Jordan. The site contains smelting workshops, dwellings, watchtowers, and administration areas. The study of the site began in early 20th century and has continued to the present. After a survey in 2002, artifacts including pottery and coins were discovered at the site, which date the occupation of the site to Middle Islamic-period and give interpretations of the activities and economics at KNA in the past.

== Geography ==
Khirbat Nuqayb al-Asaymir is located in the northwest direction of the archaeological site Khirbat Faynan; they are both located in the area of Wadi Faynan. KNA is at the midway between Dead Sea and Red Sea. The climate at KNA is arid, and the site is surrounded by a desert.

== History ==
The area of Faynan contains abundant ore resources, and copper production was thus allowed to develop in the area. The location of KNA also had a significance as it has been switched between the hands of Byzantines, Crusades, and Muslims.

In the area of Faynan, copper production occurred during the reign of Byzantine Empire. However, there is an argument about the exact time at when copper production at Faynan had stopped. The prediction ranged from 360 to 370 CE, to late sixth to early seventh century. The number of settlements in Faynan started to increase in Early Islamic period (600-1000 CE). Evidences have shown that copper production, after it ceased in late Byzantine Period, had only occurred again in Middle Islamic II period (1200-1400 CE). At this time, people at KNA either continued to practice copper production, or the activity was shifted to Khirbat Faynan. The activities at KNA site eventually declined in Late Islamic period (1400-1800 CE).

== Archaeology ==
=== Survey ===
In modern time, the site was firstly visited by Czech Traveler Alois Musil. Later, in 1934, Nelson Glueck surveyed the area of southern Transjordan, including the KNA site which he dated to the Medieval Islamic period with analysis on the existing structures and pottery. In 1980s, a team from the Deutsches Bergbau-Museum dated the site to 13th century. In 2002, the JHF survey team used a total station to make a detailed map of the features within the site; the team identified 15 primary buildings, and two buildings, building 5300 and 5304 were identified as locations where copper production mainly occurred, with building 5300 regarded as the center of smelting; building 5313 and 5314 were watchtowers which were related to nomadic activities around KNA; other buildings were probably places for living and management. Two nearby sites, WAG 57 and 58, were the main ore sources of KNA.

=== Excavation ===
==== Pottery ====
Pottery is collected from each building in the site after the 2002 survey, and can date the site with more precision. Handmade wares compose 70% of the total amount of the collected ceramic sherds. Undecorated handmade wares are 93% of handmade wares, 65% of the total amount of sherds; the remaining 7% are decorated coarse wares with geometrical decoration. For other types, 22% of the total are unglazed wheel-made wares, 28 sherds are from moldmade slipper lamps, 20 sherds are of glazed pottery, and 53 sherd are nondiagnostic.

Undecorated handmade wares indicate that KNA was occupied from Middle to Late Islamic period, but they do not date the site more precisely than that. Unglazed wheel-made wares date from 13th to 15th century. Sherds from moldmade slipper lamps date to the first half of the 13th century. The glazed pottery dates back to second half of the 13th century. Among the nondiagnostic sherds, the most common type is a brownish ware which is identified as Byzantine.

==== Coins ====
Five Syrian Ayyubid coins and one Rum Seljuq coin were found at KNA, which date between 1200 and 1235 CE.

=== Explanations ===
Since the majority of glazed sherds are from Syrian imported wares, there was certainly a trade route from KNA to Syria. Also, the affordability of imported wares is an indicator of the presence of political elites at KNA. An estimated amount of 65 - 100 tons of copper was produced in accordance to the estimated 1000 tons of slag in slag mound. The buildings, constructed using local materials, were likely to be established in Middle Islamic period for copper production. There were 2 places for copper production, each located at east and west boundaries of the site, staying far from living area, and people's comfort was therefore guaranteed. The small number of smelting workshops indicates that the production was organized in a centralized way.

== See also ==
- Khirbat Faynan
