= Ricardo Basta =

Argentine American jewelry designer

- Born: Ricardo Basta; Buenos Aires, Argentina
- Known for: Jewelry Designer
- Website: ricardobasta.com

Ricardo Basta (born in Buenos Aires, Argentina) is an Argentine American jewelry designer based in Southern California and is known for sourcing only ethically mined gems and diamonds.

== Early years and education ==
Ricardo Basta was born and raised in Buenos Aires, Argentina. At the age of 19, Basta moved to the United States. He arrived in Los Angeles, California and is a third generation jeweler. He began working for his uncle who owned and was a European trained master jeweler and expert in restoration who operated a jewelry store. Basta began by sweeping floors and eventually apprenticed with European-trained jewelers.

== Career ==
Early in his career, Basta began working for a high-end retailer in Beverly Hills that specialized in antique estate pieces, known as Frances Klein. There Basta restored and designed pieces from the Victorian, Edwardian, and Art Deco periods. Basta gained an appreciation of the designs and craftsmanship which in turn inspired his own creations.

Aside from his craftsmanship, Basta has become known for his engineering innovations. Much of his jewelry is created with built-in movement. Basta created a pair of earrings with alternating sapphires, tanzanites, garnets, rubies, and diamonds set with ball-bearings in between each section allowing the entire length of the piece to spin independently.

Basta has also become recognized in his field as a platinum expert. In 1986 when information was scarce on the subject, he began to cast in platinum and began to research and study the properties of platinum. Most design houses weren’t using platinum quite yet. Through the process of trial and error, he developed an understanding of the best way to work with the precious metal. Since then, the learning curve has decreased due to the popularity of the metal and the development of resources, equipment and technology. Also, due to his experience with platinum, he has written contributing articles for the Platinum Guild International on the subjects of casting and antique jewelry restoration, as well as articles on designing and manufacturing in platinum.

In 2004 Basta started his own brand. He is based in Century City on Santa Monica Blvd.

In 2005 Basta was judge at the AGTA Spectrum Awards.

== Exhibitions ==
From 2007 until 2010, Basta had his first exhibition at the Carnegie Museum of Natural History in Pittsburgh, Pennsylvania. There he participated in a group exhibition entitled: Luxe Life: Masterpieces of American Jewelry. The exhibit featured extravagant pieces of jewelry, ranging in age from mid-19th-century to modern. Basta displayed two pieces for the exhibition: a snowflake brooch and a seahorse brooch.

That same year, Basta had his first solo show exhibiting one-of-a-kind brooches at the Gemological Institute of America Museum in Carlsbad, California. The show included pieces made with green sapphire, fire opal, platinum, diamonds, gold, mother-of-pearl, ivory and elephant hair.

In 2018, Basta had several of his pieces featured in the Headley-Whitney Museum of Art with The American Jewelry Design Council.

== Awards ==
- 2000 AGTA Award
- 2002 AGTA Spectrum Awards - Evening Platinum Honors
- 2003 MJSA Vision Award
- 2004 AGTA Spectrum Awards - 1st Place Bridal Wear
- 2004 AGTA Spectrum Awards - Honorable Mention Casual Wear
- 2004 MJSA Vision Award
- 2005 AGTA Award
- 2008 AGTA Spectrum Awards - 1st Place Evening Wear
- 2009 AGTA Spectrum Awards, 1st Place Men's Wear
- 2009 AGTA Spectrum Awards - Manufacturing Honors Men's Wear
- 2012 AGTA Award
- 2014 AGTA Spectrum Awards - Manufacturing Honors Business/Day Wear
- 2014 Excellence in Service Award by Jewelers 24Karat Club of Southern California
- 2016 AGTA Spectrum Awards - 1st Place Business/Day Wear
- 2016 AGTA Spectrum Awards - 2nd Place Evening Wear
- 2016 Summer AGTA Spectrum Awards - 1st Place Business/Day Wear
- 2016 Summer AGTA Spectrum Awards -1st Place Bridal Wear / Platinum honors
- 2016 JA CASE Awards - 1st Place Jewelry $5,001 - $10,000
- 2017 JA CASE Awards - Honorable Mention
- 2017 MJSA Vision Award - CAD / CAM Distinction
- 2017 AGTA Spectrum Awards - 1st Place Men's Wear
- 2017 AGTA Spectrum Awards - 1st Place Bridal Wear
- 2017 AGTA Spectrum Awards - Manufacturing Honors
- 2018 JA CASE Awards - $2,001 - $5,000
- 2018 AGTA Spectrum Awards - Best Use of Color
- 2018 AGTA Spectrum Awards - 2nd Place Bridal Wear
- 2019 AGTA Award
- 2019 JA CASE Awards
- 2020 JCK Jeweler's Choice Awards
- 2021 JCK Jeweler's Choice Awards
- 2022 JCK Jeweler's Choice Awards
- 2024 JCK Jeweler's Choice Awards
- 2025 JCK Jeweler's Choice Awards
