= Basta (archaeological site) =

Prehistoric archaeological site in Jordan

- بسطة (Arabic)
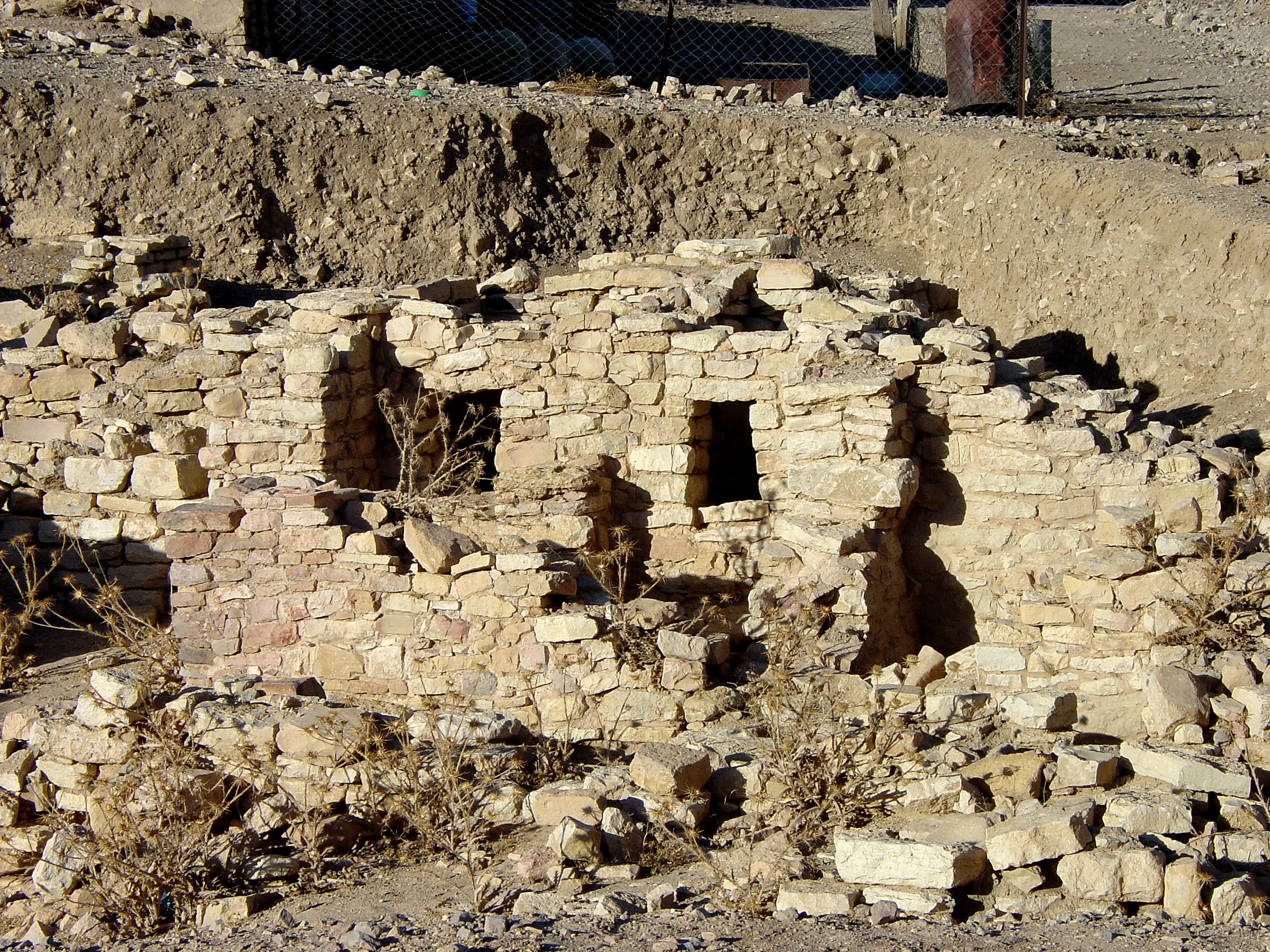
- Basta

- Location of Basta in Jordan
- 30°14′N 35°32′E
- Location: Jordan

Site notes
- Elevation: 1,460 m (4,790 ft)

Basta (Arabic: بسطة) is a pre-historic archaeological site and village in Ma'an Governorate, Jordan, 36 kilometres (22 mi) southeast of Petra. It is named for the nearby contemporary village of Basta. Like the nearby site of Ba'ja, Basta was built in c. 7000 BC and belongs to the PPNB (Pre-Pottery Neolithic B) period. Basta is one of the earliest known places to have a settled population who grew crops and domesticated livestock.

== Archeological site ==
The Basta's settlement dates back to the early periods of human small settlements and the use of agricultural crops as a way to sustain their inhabitants. Along with the crops, also is one of the archeological sites that marks the first use of animal domestication. Due to the relics founded dating before 9000 BC, the place is considered as one of the first places in the world that initiated the process of human settlement in great scale.

The houses in Basta were built on the familiar circular shape, and this design enabled individuals within the same house to live together. They used limestone to build their homes, as this can be known by the height of the walls in some places and the stone partitions whose floors were made with wood. These woods were from trees of the area and imported from other regions.

There are no cemeteries, on the contrary, the people of the ancient village used to bury their dead under the floors of their homes. The archaeologists believes that the intent is to remind successive generations of the relationship of families and individuals to their homes, which later became a basic concept of place and home ownership for farmers and villagers. Of course, this socio-religious concept has its impact on the formation of the city, the first nucleus of civilization at the region.

Being a civilization that predates the invention of pottery, the household items that were found were made of stone and bone from which grinding tools and mills were made, while flint was used to make arrowheads. Animal dolls such as a sitting deer, the head of a bull or a cow, the head of a bear and the head of a ram, were also found, which may have religious meaning.

In their highest point, Basta became a regional center of trade and "industrial" production of handmade tools. Thanks to the domestication, trade and agriculture, Basta reached the population of at least 1000 people, which it made one of the most populated settlements in that time along with the ancient settlement of Beidha, which is located near.

There is no consensus about the decline of Basta, but researchers believes that the fast growth of the settlement, an earthquake and the overconsumption of natural resources of the area were the factors that caused the decline and, consequently, the disappearance of the city around 5000 BC.

== See also ==
- Archaeological sites in Jordan
- Domestication
- Pre-Pottery Neolithic B

== Bibliography ==
- Government of Jordan, Department of Statistics (1964). First Census of Population and Housing. Volume I: Final Tables; General Characteristics of the Population (PDF).
