= Augustine of Hippo =

Christian philosopher and theologian (354–430)

Saint Augustine of Hippo
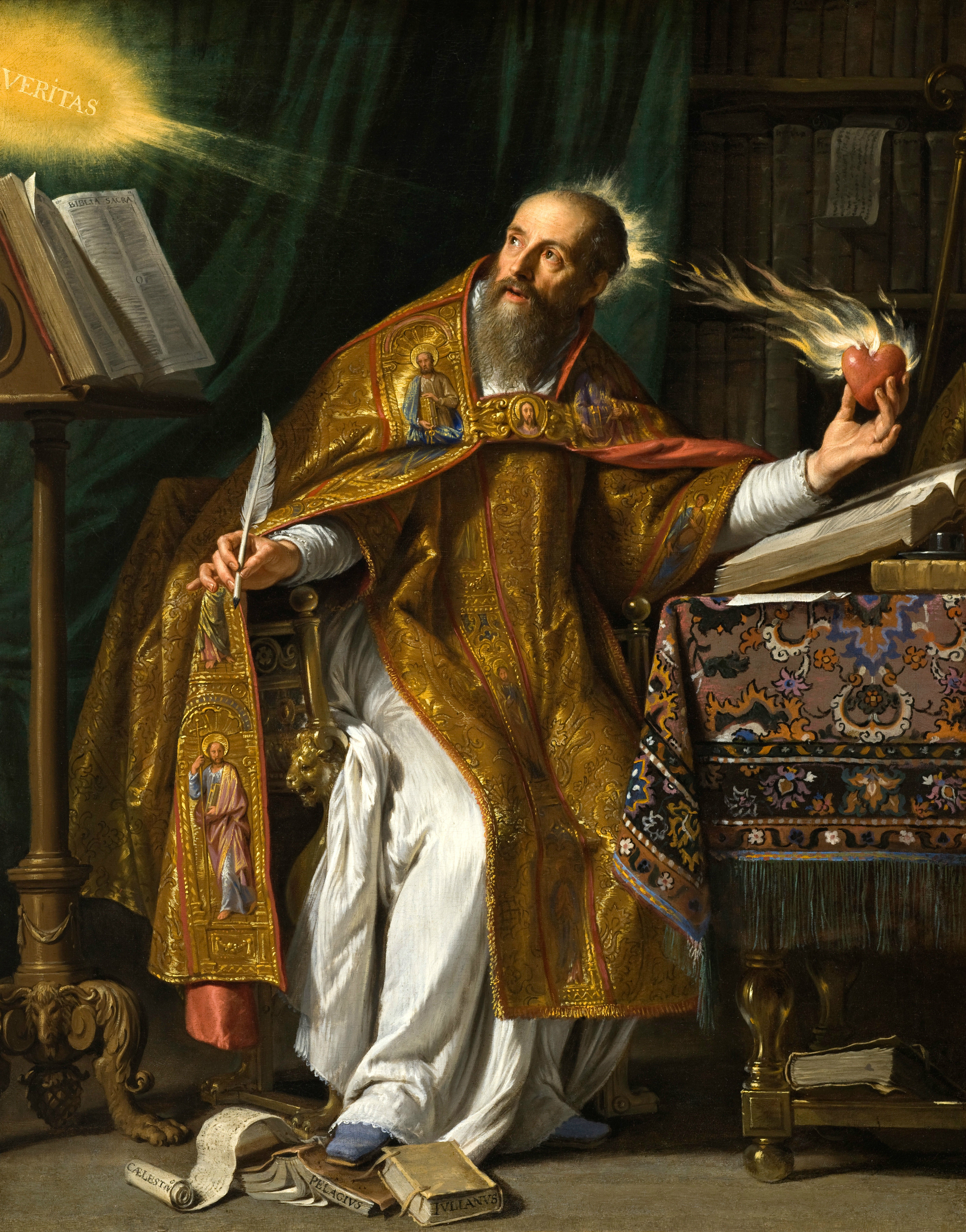
- Saint Augustin by Philippe de Champaigne, c. 1645

Bishop of Hippo Regius Church Father Doctor of the Church Blessed
- Born: Aurelius Augustinus; 13 November 354; Thagaste, Numidia Cirtensis, Roman Empire (present-day Souk Ahras, Algeria)
- Died: 28 August 430 (aged 75); Hippo Regius, Numidia Cirtensis, Western Roman Empire (present-day Annaba, Algeria)
- Resting place: Pavia, Italy
- Venerated in: All Christian denominations which venerate saints
- Canonized: Pre-Congregation
- Major shrine: San Pietro in Ciel d'Oro, Pavia, Italy
- Feast: 28 August (Western Christianity); 15 June (Eastern Christianity); 4 November (Assyrian)
- Attributes: Crozier, mitre, young child, book, small church, flaming or pierced heart
- Patronage: Brewers; Printers; Theologians; Philosophers; Sore eyes; Bridgeport, Connecticut; Cagayan de Oro; San Agustin, Isabela; Mendez, Cavite; Tanza, Cavite; Baliwag, Bulacan; Lubao, Pampanga; Iba, Zambales

Education
- Academic advisor: Ambrose

Philosophical work
- Region: Western philosophy
- School: Augustinianism
- Notable students: Paul Orosius; Prosper of Aquitaine
- Main interests: Christian anthropology; Biblical criticism; Epistemology; Ethics; Metaphysics; Pedagogy; Philosophy of religion; Theodicy; Theology
- Notable works: Confessions; On Christian Doctrine; On the Trinity; The City of God
- Notable ideas: Filioque; Original sin; Free will; Augustinian soteriology; Just war theory; Absence of good; Concupiscence; Sacramental character; Augustinian hypothesis; Augustinian theodicy; Augustinian values; Divine command theory; Amillennialism; You are Christ; Deity; Solvitur ambulando; Heroic virtue; Incurvatus in se; Genesis as an allegory; Divine illumination; Theocentricism; Limbo

Ordination history
History
Priestly ordination
- Date: 391
- Place: Hippo Regius
Episcopal consecration
- Consecrated by: Megalius
- Date: 395

Augustine of Hippo (/ɔːˈɡʌstɪn/ uh-GUST-in or aw-GUST-in, US also /ˈɔːɡəstiːn/ AW-gə-steen; Latin: Aurelius Augustinus Hipponensis; 13 November 354 – 28 August 430), also well-known as Saint Augustine, was a Christian theologian and philosopher from Thagaste, Numidia Cirtensis and the Bishop of Hippo Regius. He is generally regarded as one of the most influential philosophers in the history of the Western world, and is viewed as one of the most important Church Fathers of the Latin Church in the Patristic Period.

In his youth he was drawn to the Manichaean faith, and later to the Hellenistic philosophy of Neoplatonism. After his conversion to Christianity and baptism in 386 by Saint Ambrose, Augustine developed his own approach to philosophy and theology, making significant contributions in a wide variety of areas. He is known as Doctor Gratiae ("Doctor of Grace") for the vast influence of his views on the necessity of unmerited, prevenient grace, for salvation and the nature of original sin.

Additionally, he made important contributions in ecclesiology, noting the validity of sacraments regardless of the merit of the celebrant against the views of the Donatists. In his book The City of God, Augustine imagined the Church as a spiritual City, distinct from the material Earthly City, against the backdrop of the fall of the Western Roman Empire. He is also widely recognized for his contributions to just war theory. His other notable works include On the Trinity, On Christian Doctrine, and Confessions, the latter of which was the first Western autobiography.

Augustine is recognized as a saint in the Catholic Church, the Eastern Orthodox Church, the Lutheran churches, and the Anglican Communion. Generally regarded as one of the greatest theologians and philosophers in the history of the Catholic Church, he is one of the four Great Latin Church Fathers, along with Ambrose, Jerome, and Pope Gregory I. His thoughts profoundly influenced the Medieval worldview, and he was the most cited author in the Summa Theologiae of St. Thomas Aquinas. Many Protestants, especially Calvinists and Lutherans, consider him one of the theological fathers of the Protestant Reformation due to his teachings on salvation and divine grace, although this interpretation is disputed by the Catholic Church. In Eastern Orthodoxy, he remains highly venerated, but some of his teachings, including the filioque, are more disputed.

== Biography ==
=== Name ===
Augustine of Hippo, also known as Saint Augustine or Saint Austin, is known by various cognomens throughout the many denominations of the Christian world, including Blessed Augustine and the Doctor of Grace (Latin: Doctor gratiae).

=== Childhood and education ===
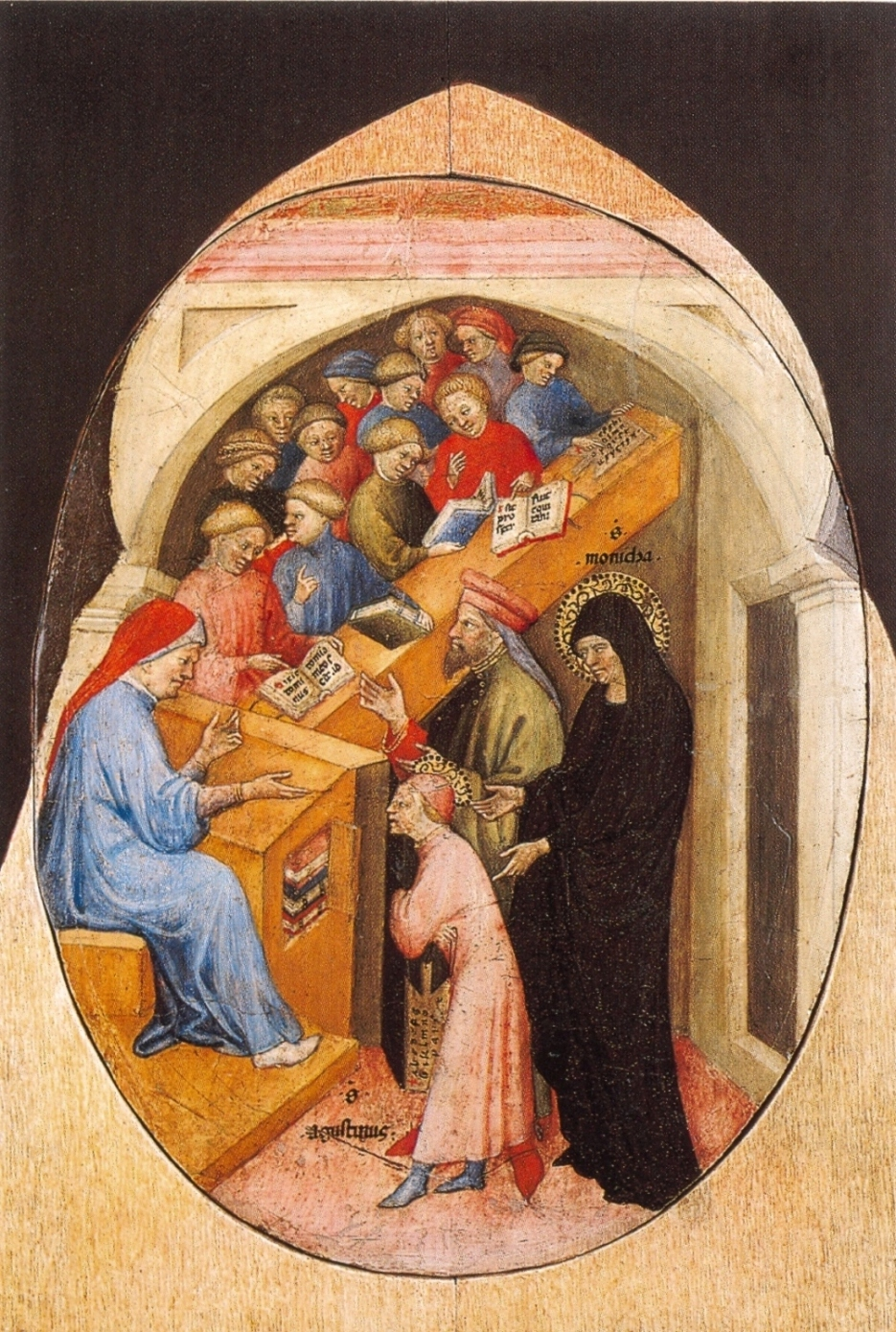
Saint Augustine Taken to School by Saint Monica, by Niccolò di Pietro, 1413–15

Augustine was born in 354 in the municipium of Thagaste (now Souk Ahras, Algeria) in the Roman province of Numidia. His mother, Monica or Monnica, (Note: "[T]he names Monnica and Nonnica are found on tombstones in the Libyan language – as such Monnica is the only Berber name commonly used in English."Brett & Fentress 1996, p. 293) was a devout Christian; his father Patricius was a pagan who converted to Christianity on his deathbed. He had a brother named Navigius and a sister whose name is lost but is conventionally remembered as Perpetua.

Scholars generally agree that Augustine and his family were Berbers, an ethnic group indigenous to North Africa, but were heavily Romanized, speaking only Latin at home as a matter of pride and dignity. In his writings, Augustine mentions in passing his identity as a Roman African. For example, he refers to Ponticianus as "a country man of ours, insofar as being African," and to Faustus of Mileve as "an African Gentleman". He writes that Apuleius "as an African is better known to us Africans".

Augustine's family name, Aurelius, suggests his father's ancestors were freedmen of the gens Aurelia given full Roman citizenship by the Edict of Caracalla in 212. Augustine's family had been Roman, from a legal standpoint, for at least a century when he was born. It is assumed that his mother, Monica, was of Berber origin, on the basis of her name, but as his family were honestiores, an upper class of citizens known as honorable men, Augustine's first language was likely Latin.

At the age of 11, Augustine was sent to school at Madaurus (now M'Daourouch), a small Numidian city about 31 kilometres (19 miles) south of Thagaste. There he became familiar with Latin literature, as well as pagan beliefs and practices. His first insight into the nature of sin occurred when he and a number of friends stole pears from a neighbourhood garden. He tells this story in his autobiography, Confessions. He realises that the pears were "tempting neither for its colour nor its flavour" – he was neither hungry nor poor, and he had enough of fruit which were "much better". Over the next few chapters, Augustine agonises over this past sin of his, recognising that one does not desire evil for evil's sake. Rather, "through an inordinate preference for these goods of a lower kind, the better and higher are neglected". In other words, man is drawn to sin when grossly choosing the lesser good over a greater good. Eventually, Augustine concludes that it was the good of the "companionship" between him and his accomplices that allowed him to delight in this theft.

At the age of 17, through the generosity of his fellow citizen Romanianus, Augustine went to Carthage to continue his education in rhetoric, though it was above the financial means of his family. Despite the good warnings of his mother, as a youth Augustine lived a hedonistic lifestyle for a time, associating with young men who boasted of their sexual exploits. The need to gain their acceptance encouraged inexperienced boys like Augustine to seek or make up stories about sexual experiences.

It was while he was a student in Carthage that he read Cicero's dialogue Hortensius (now lost), which he described as leaving a lasting impression, enkindling in his heart the love of wisdom and a great thirst for truth. It started his interest in philosophy. Although raised Christian, Augustine became a Manichaean, much to his mother's chagrin.

At about the age of 17, Augustine began a relationship with a young woman in Carthage. Though his mother wanted him to marry a person of his class, the woman remained his lover. He was warned by his mother to avoid fornication (sex outside marriage), but Augustine persisted in the relationship for over fifteen years, and the woman gave birth to his son Adeodatus (372–388), which means "Gift from God", who was viewed as extremely intelligent by his contemporaries. In 385, Augustine ended his relationship with his lover in order to prepare to marry a teenage heiress. By the time he was able to marry her, however, he had already converted to Christianity and decided to become a Christian priest and the marriage did not happen.

Augustine was, from the beginning, a brilliant student, with an eager intellectual curiosity, but he never mastered Greek – his first Greek teacher was a brutal man who constantly beat his students, and Augustine rebelled and refused to study. By the time he realized he needed to know Greek, it was too late; and although he acquired a smattering of the language, he was never eloquent with it. He did, however, become a master of Latin.

=== Move to Carthage, Rome, and Milan ===
Augustine taught grammar at Thagaste between 373 and 374. The following year he moved to Carthage to conduct a school of rhetoric and remained there for the next nine years. Disturbed by unruly students in Carthage, he moved to establish a school in Rome, where he believed the best and brightest rhetoricians practised, in 383. However, Augustine was disappointed with the apathetic reception. It was the custom for students to pay their fees to the professor on the last day of the term, and many students attended faithfully all term, and then did not pay.

Manichaean friends introduced him to the prefect of the City of Rome, Symmachus, who had been asked by the imperial court at Milan to provide a rhetoric professor. Augustine won the job and headed north to take his position in Milan in late 384. At thirty years old, he had won the most visible academic position in the Latin world at a time when such posts gave ready access to political careers.

Although Augustine spent ten years as a Manichaean, he was never an initiate or "elect", but an "auditor", the lowest level in this religion's hierarchy. While still at Carthage a disappointing meeting with the Manichaean bishop, Faustus of Mileve, a key exponent of Manichaean theology, started Augustine's scepticism of Manichaeanism. In Rome, he reportedly turned away from Manichaeanism, embracing the scepticism of the New Academy movement. Because of his education, Augustine had great rhetorical prowess and was very knowledgeable of the philosophies behind many faiths. At Milan, his mother's religiosity, Augustine's own studies in Neoplatonism, and his friend Simplicianus all urged him towards Christianity. This was shortly after the Roman emperor Theodosius I declared Christianity to be the only legitimate religion for the Roman Empire on 27 February 380 by the Edict of Thessalonica and then issued a decree of death for all Manichaean monks in 382. Initially, Augustine was not strongly influenced by Christianity and its ideologies, but after coming in contact with Ambrose of Milan, Augustine reevaluated himself and was forever changed.

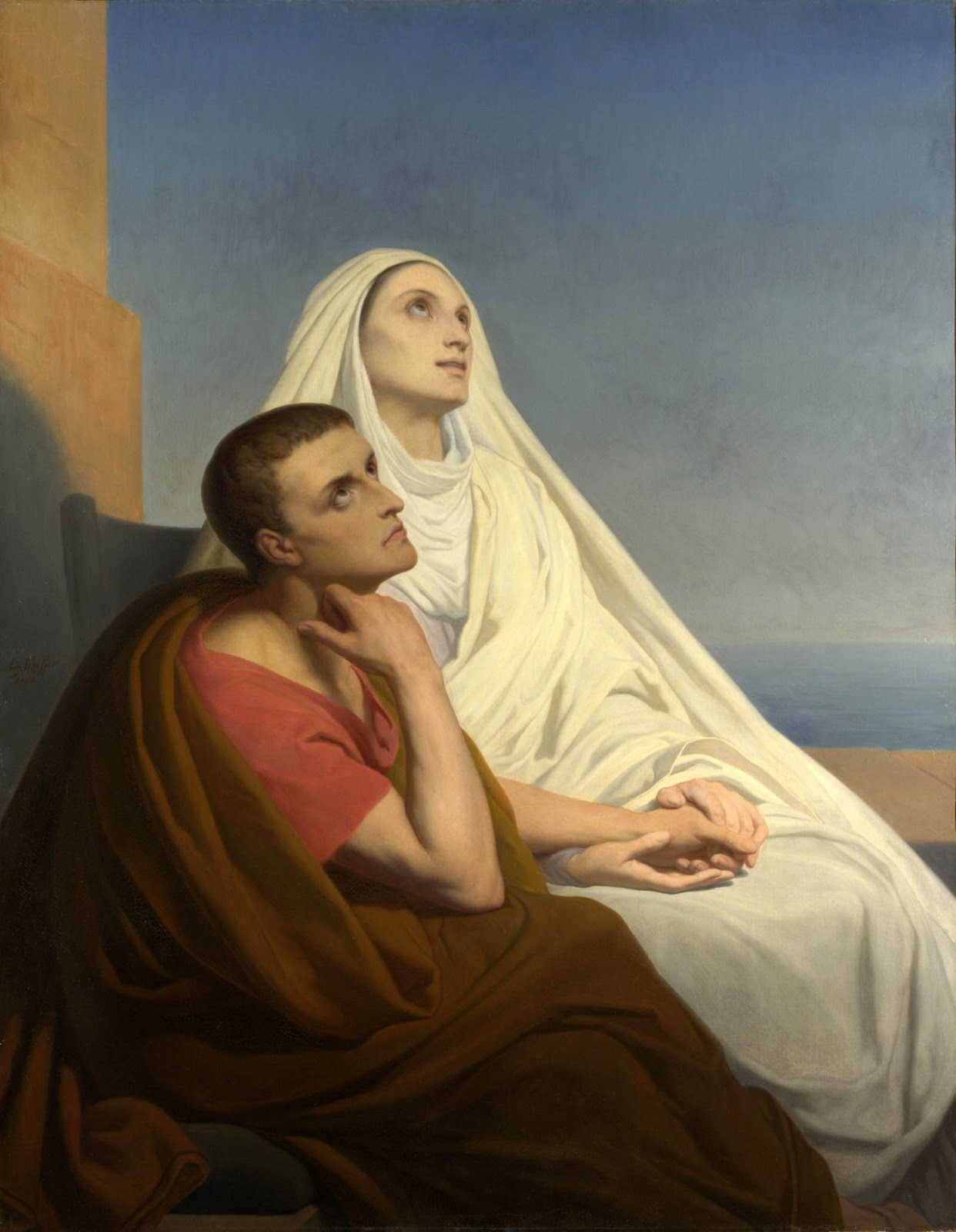
Saint Augustine and his mother, Saint Monica (1846) by Ary Scheffer

Augustine arrived in Milan and visited Ambrose, having heard of his reputation as an orator. Like Augustine, Ambrose was a master of rhetoric, but older and more experienced. Soon, their relationship grew, as Augustine wrote, "And I began to love him, of course, not at the first as a teacher of the truth, for I had entirely despaired of finding that in thy Church – but as a friendly man." Augustine was very much influenced by Ambrose, even more than by his own mother and others he admired. In his Confessions, Augustine states, "That man of God received me as a father would, and welcomed my coming as a good bishop should." Ambrose adopted Augustine as a spiritual son after the death of Augustine's father.

Augustine's mother had followed him to Milan and arranged a respectable marriage for him. Although Augustine acquiesced, he had to dismiss his concubine and grieved for having forsaken his lover. He wrote, "My mistress being torn from my side as an impediment to my marriage, my heart, which clave to her, was racked, and wounded, and bleeding." Augustine confessed he had not been a lover of wedlock so much as a slave of lust, so he procured another concubine since he had to wait two years until his fiancée came of age. (Note: Augustine later wrote in Confessions: "I thought it should be too miserable unless folded in female arms.") However, his emotional wound was not healed. It was during this period that he uttered his famously insincere prayer, "Grant me chastity and continence, but not yet."

There is evidence Augustine may have considered this former relationship to be equivalent to marriage. In his Confessions, he admitted the experience eventually produced a decreased sensitivity to pain. Augustine eventually broke off his engagement to his eleven-year-old fiancée, but never renewed his relationship with either of his concubines. Alypius of Thagaste steered Augustine away from marriage, saying they could not live a life together in the love of wisdom if he married. Augustine looked back years later on the life at Cassiciacum, a villa outside of Milan where he gathered with his followers, and described it as Christianae vitae otium – the leisure of Christian life.

=== Conversion to Christianity and priesthood ===
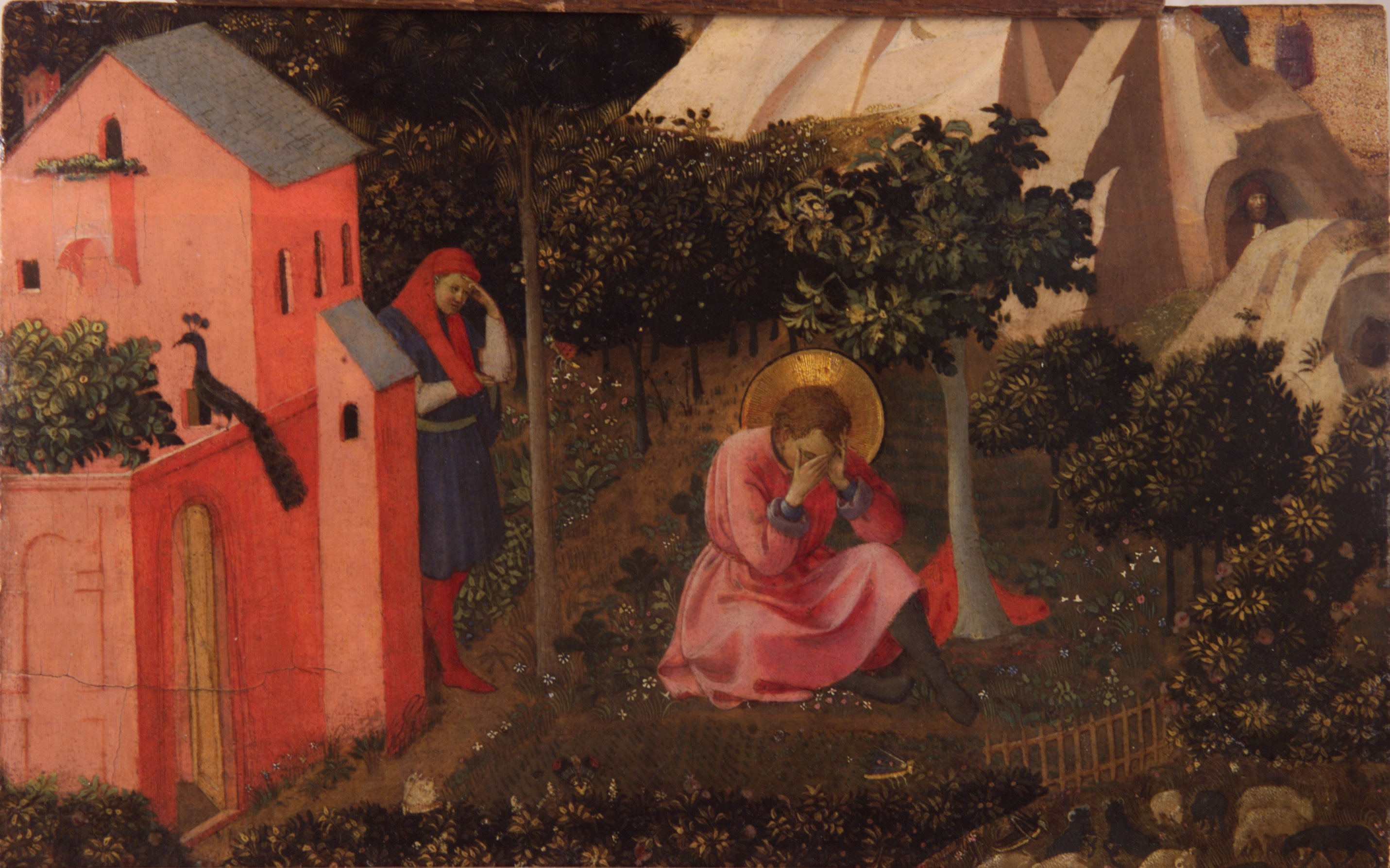
The Conversion of St. Augustine by Fra Angelico

In late August of 386, (Note: Brown 2000, p. 64 places Augustine's garden conversion at the end of August, 386.) at the age of 31, having heard of Ponticianus's and his friends' first reading of the life of Anthony of the Desert, Augustine converted to Christianity. As Augustine later told it, his conversion was prompted by hearing a child's voice say "take up and read" (Latin: tolle, lege). Resorting to the sortes biblicae, he opened a book of St. Paul's writings (Confessiones 8.12.29) at random and read Romans 13:13–14: "Not in rioting and drunkenness, not in chambering and wantonness, not in strife and envying, but put on the Lord Jesus Christ, and make no provision for the flesh to fulfil the lusts thereof."

He later wrote an account of his conversion in his Confessions (Latin: Confessiones), which has since become a classic of Christian theology and a key text in the history of autobiography. This work is an outpouring of thanksgiving and penitence. Although it is written as an account of his life, the Confessions also talks about the nature of time, causality, free will, and other important philosophical topics. The following is taken from that work:

Belatedly I loved thee, O Beauty so ancient and so new, belatedly I loved thee. For see, thou wast within and I was without, and I sought thee out there. Unlovely, I rushed heedlessly among the lovely things thou hast made. Thou wast with me, but I was not with thee. These things kept me far from thee; even though they were not at all unless they were in thee. Thou didst call and cry aloud, and didst force open my deafness. Thou didst gleam and shine, and didst chase away my blindness. Thou didst breathe fragrant odours and I drew in my breath; and now I pant for thee. I tasted, and now I hunger and thirst. Thou didst touch me, and I burned for thy peace.

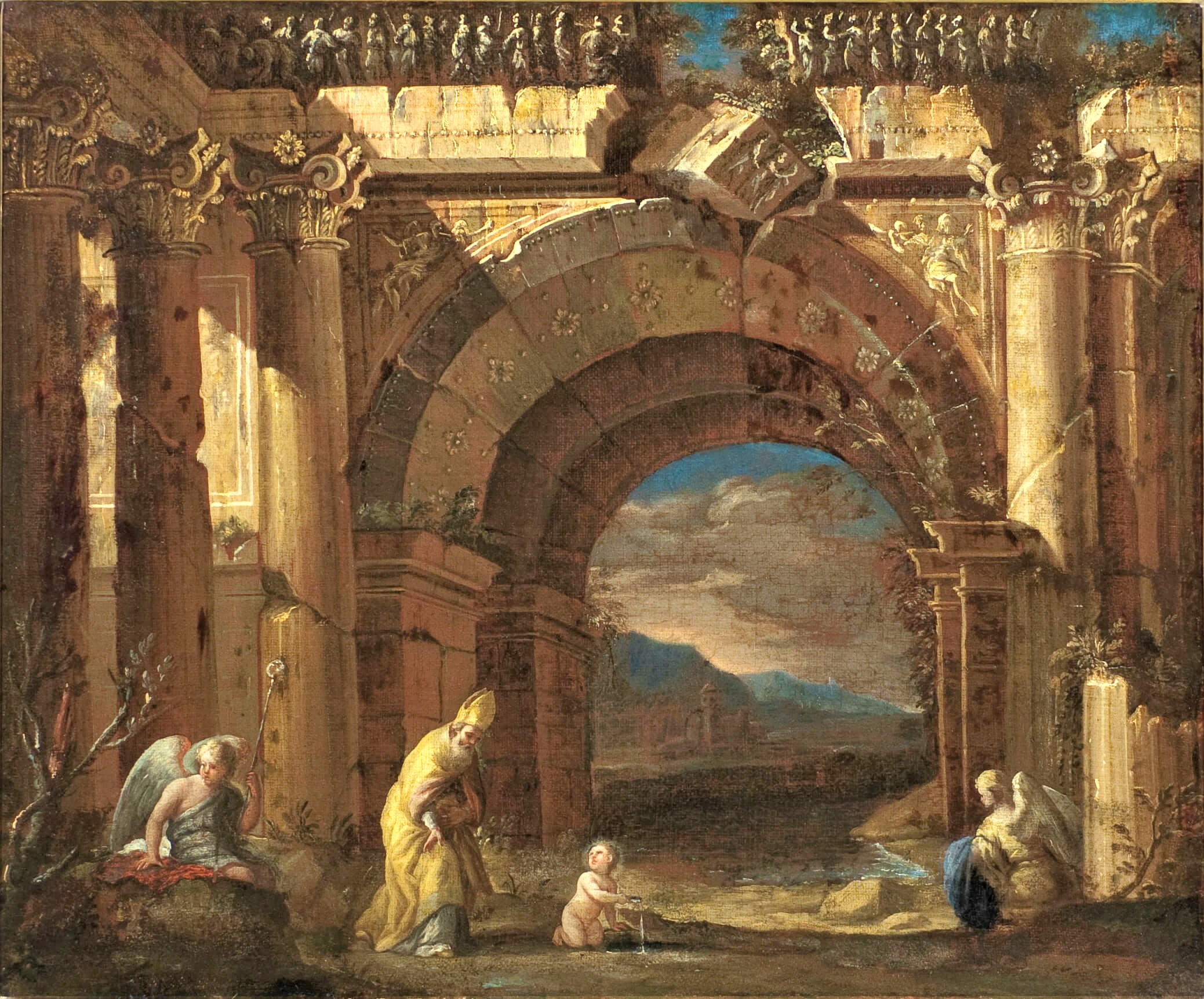
The vision of St. Augustine by Ascanio Luciano

Ambrose baptized Augustine and his son Adeodatus, in Milan on Easter Vigil, 24–25 April 387. A year later, in 388, Augustine completed his apology On the Holiness of the Catholic Church. That year, also, Adeodatus and Augustine returned home to Africa. Augustine's mother Monica died at Ostia, Italy, as they prepared to embark for Africa. Upon their arrival, they began a life of aristocratic leisure at Augustine's family's property. Soon after, Adeodatus, too, died. Augustine then sold his patrimony and gave the money to the poor. He only kept the family house, which he converted into a monastic foundation for himself and a group of friends. Furthermore, while he was known for his major contributions to Christian rhetoric, another major contribution was his preaching style.

After converting to Christianity, Augustine turned against his profession as a rhetoric professor in order to devote more time to preaching. In 391 Augustine was ordained a priest in Hippo Regius (now Annaba), in Algeria. He was especially interested in discovering how his previous rhetorical training in Italian schools would help the Christian Church achieve its objective of discovering and teaching the different scriptures in the Bible. He became a famous preacher (more than 350 preserved sermons are believed to be authentic), and was noted for combating the Manichaean religion, to which he had formerly adhered. He preached around 6,000 to 10,000 sermons when he was alive; however, there are only around 500 sermons that are accessible today. When Augustine preached his sermons, they were recorded by stenographers. Some of his sermons would last over one hour and he would preach multiple times throughout a given week. When talking to his audience, he would stand on an elevated platform; however, he would walk towards the audience during his sermons. When he was preaching, he used a variety of rhetorical devices that included analogies, word pictures, similes, metaphors, repetition, and antithesis when trying to explain more about the Bible. In addition, he used questions and rhymes when talking about the differences between people's life on Earth and Heaven as seen in one of his sermons that was preached in 412 AD. Augustine believed that the preachers' ultimate goal is to ensure the salvation of their audience.

In 395, he was made coadjutor Bishop of Hippo and became full Bishop shortly thereafter, hence the name "Augustine of Hippo"; and he gave his property to the church of Thagaste. He remained in that position until his death in 430. Bishops were the only individuals allowed to preach when he was alive and he scheduled time to preach after being ordained despite a busy schedule made up of preparing sermons and preaching at other churches besides his own. When serving as the Bishop of Hippo, his goal was to minister to individuals in his congregation and he would choose the passages that the church planned to read every week. As bishop, he believed that it was his job to interpret the work of the Bible. He wrote his autobiographical Confessions in 397–398. His work The City of God was written to console his fellow Christians shortly after the Visigoths had sacked Rome in 410. Augustine worked tirelessly to convince the people of Hippo to convert to Christianity. Though he had left his monastery, he continued to lead a monastic life in the episcopal residence.

Much of Augustine's later life was recorded by his friend Possidius, bishop of Calama (present-day Guelma, Algeria), in his Sancti Augustini Vita. During this latter part of Augustine's life, he helped lead a large community of Christians against different political and religious factors which had a major influence on his writings. Possidius admired Augustine as a man of powerful intellect and a stirring orator who took every opportunity to defend Christianity against its detractors. Possidius also described Augustine's personal traits in detail, drawing a portrait of a man who ate sparingly, worked tirelessly, despised gossip, shunned the temptations of the flesh, and exercised prudence in the financial stewardship of his see.

=== Death and sainthood ===
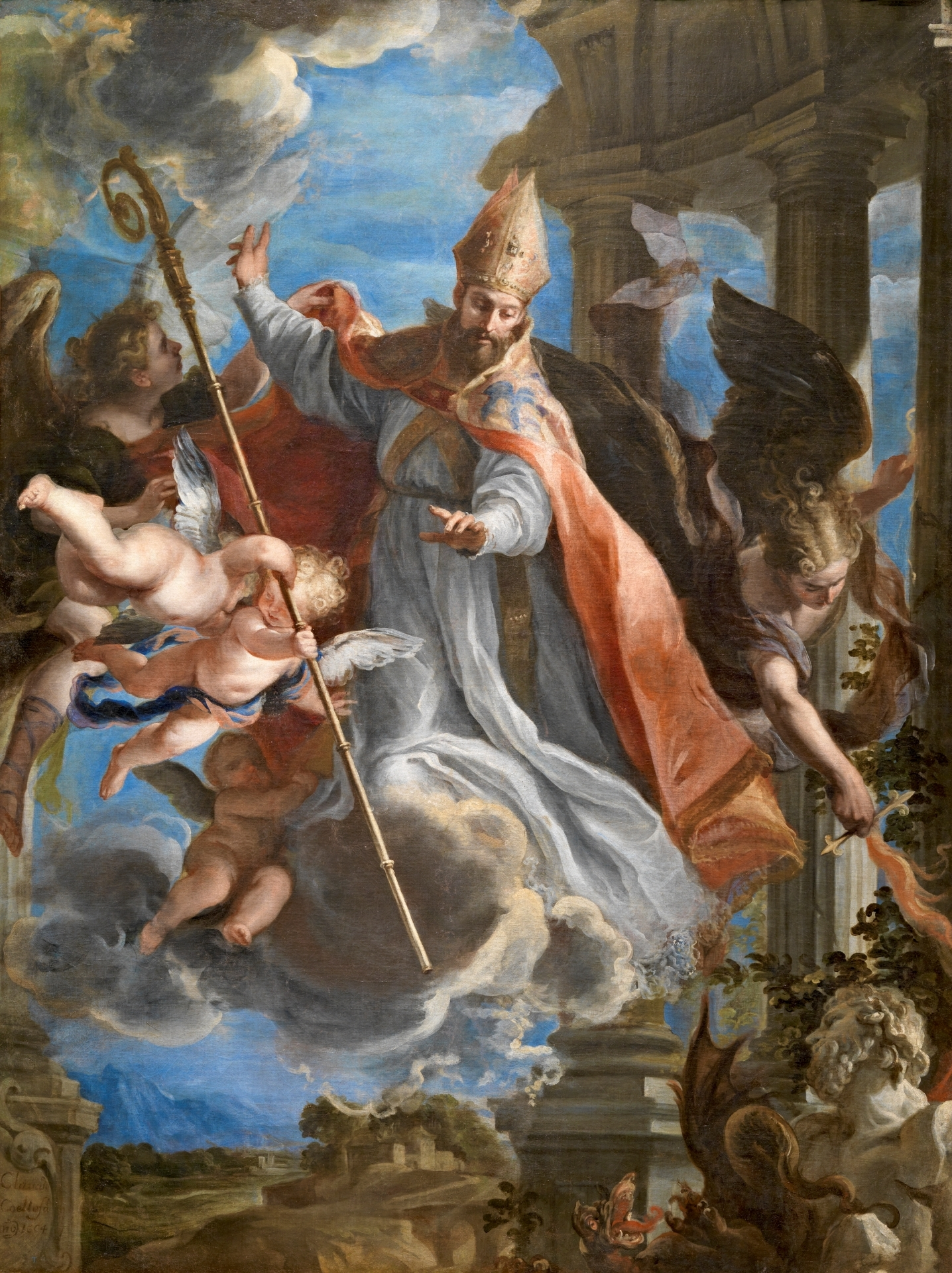
Baroque Painting of Augustine triumphantly ascending into Heaven on a cloud c. 1664

Shortly before Augustine's death, the Vandals, a Germanic tribe that had converted to Arianism, invaded Roman Africa. The Vandals besieged Hippo in the spring of 430 when Augustine entered his final illness. According to Possidius, one of the few miracles attributed to Augustine, the healing of an ill man, took place during the siege. Spending his final days in prayer and repentance, he requested the penitential Psalms of David be hung on his walls so he could read them, which led him to "[weep] freely and constantly" according to Possidius's biography. He directed the library of the church in Hippo and all the books therein should be carefully preserved. He died on 28 August 430. Shortly after his death, the Vandals lifted the siege of Hippo, but they returned soon after and burned the city. They destroyed all but Augustine's cathedral and library, which they left untouched.

Augustine was canonized by popular acclaim, and recognized as a Doctor of the Church in 1298 by Pope Boniface VIII. His feast day is 28 August. He is considered the patron saint of brewers, printers, theologians, and a number of cities and dioceses. He is invoked against sore eyes.

Augustine is remembered in the Church of England's calendar of saints with a lesser festival on 28 August.

==== Relics ====
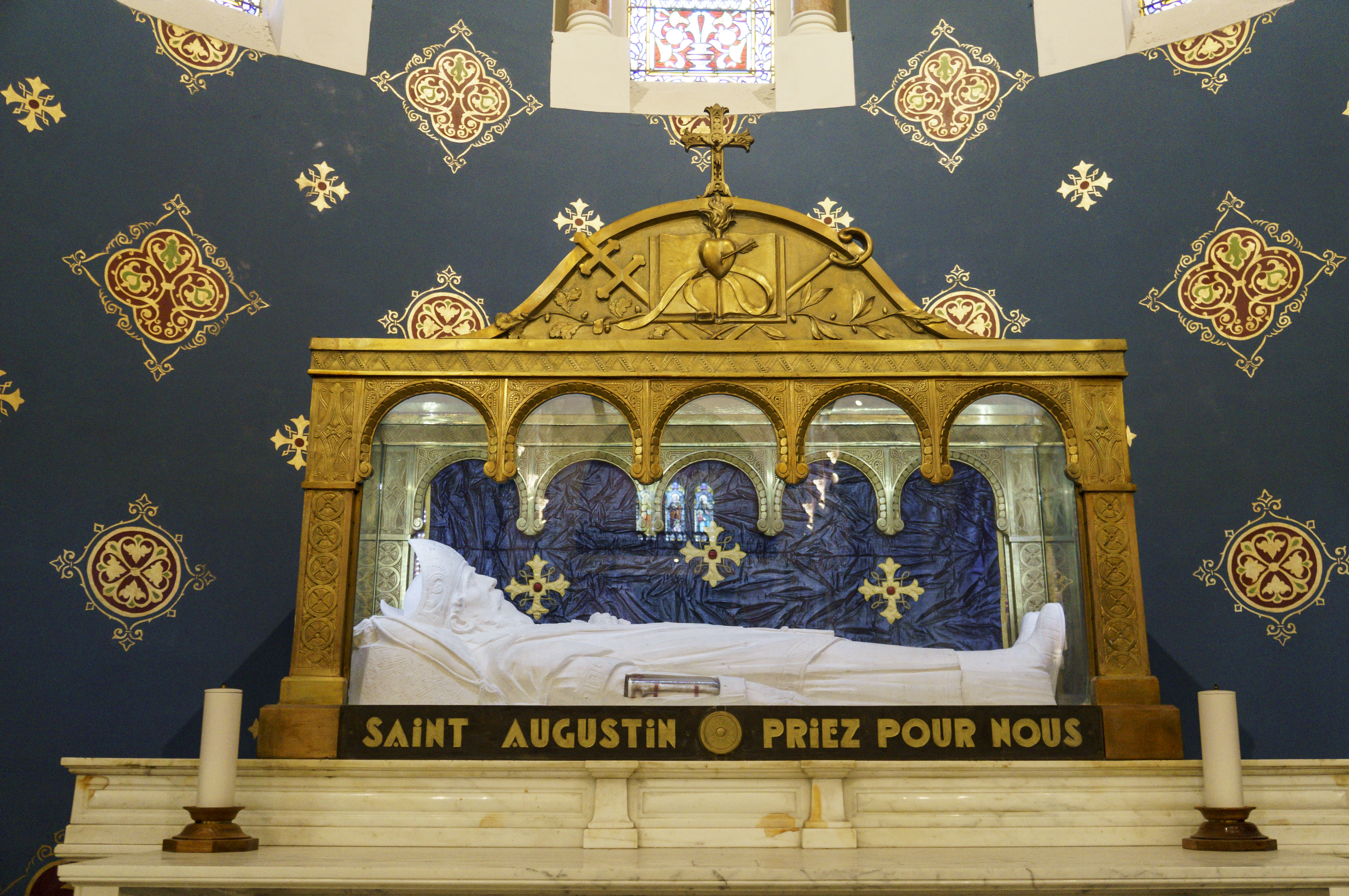
Augustine's arm bones, Saint Augustin Basilica, Annaba, Algeria

According to Bede's True Martyrology, Augustine's body was later translated to Cagliari, Sardinia, by the Catholic bishops expelled from North Africa by Huneric. Around 720, his remains were transported again by Peter, bishop of Pavia and uncle of the Lombard king Liutprand, to the church of San Pietro in Ciel d'Oro in Pavia, to save them from frequent coastal raids by Saracens. In January 1327, Pope John XXII issued the papal bull Veneranda Santorum Patrum, appointing the Augustinians guardians of the tomb of Augustine, called the Arca. It was remade in 1362 and elaborately carved with bas-reliefs of scenes from Augustine's life, created by Giovanni di Balduccio.

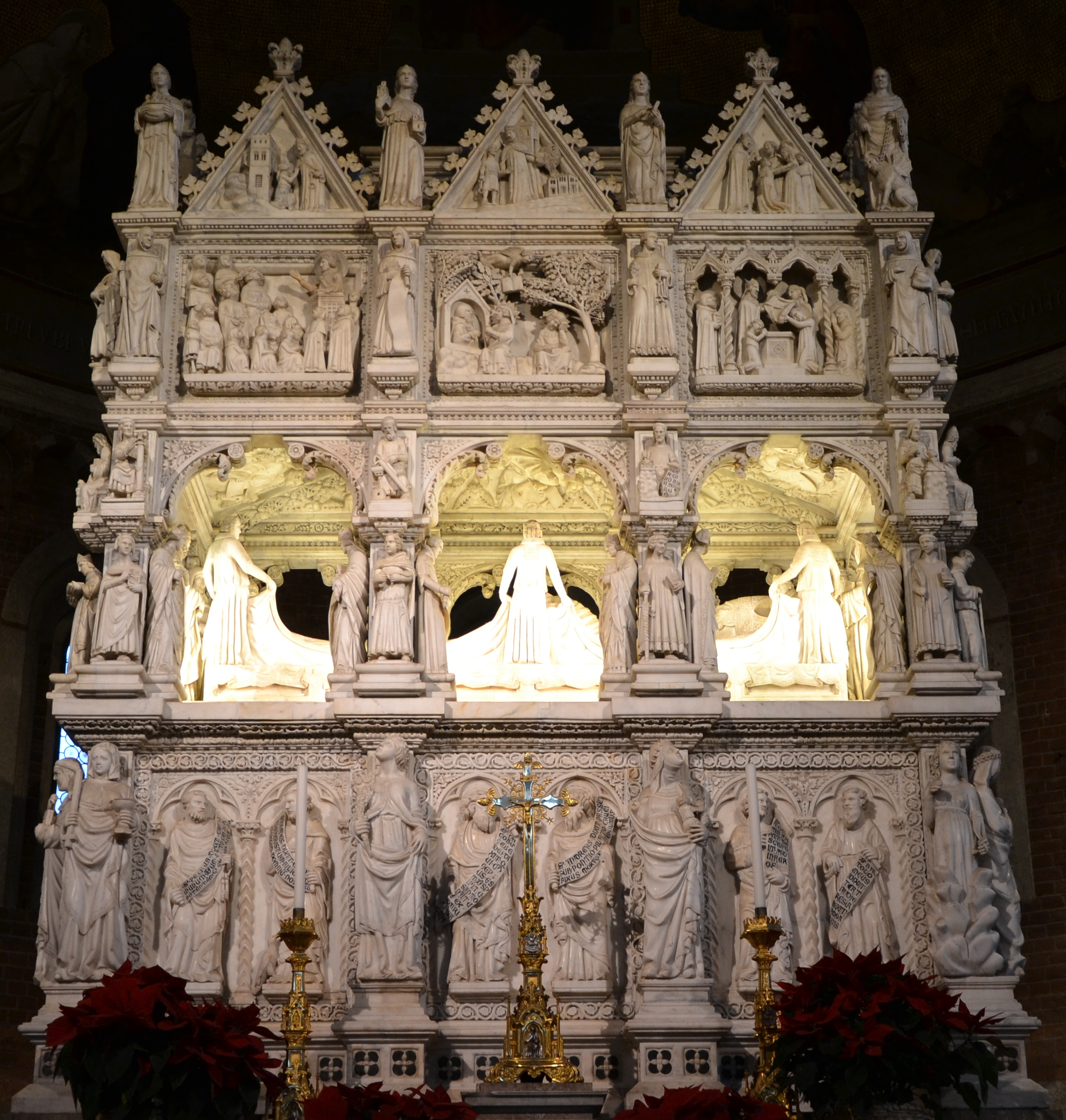
Giovanni di Balduccio, Tomb of St Augustine, 1362–1365, San Pietro in Ciel d'Oro, Pavia

In October 1695, some workmen in the Church of San Pietro in Ciel d'Oro in Pavia discovered a marble box containing human bones (including part of a skull). A dispute arose between the Augustinian hermits (Order of Saint Augustine) and the regular canons (Canons Regular of Saint Augustine) as to whether these were the bones of Augustine. The hermits did not believe so; the canons affirmed they were. Pope Benedict XIII (1724–1730) directed the Bishop of Pavia, Monsignor Pertusati, to make a determination. The bishop declared that, in his opinion, the bones were those of Augustine.

The Augustinians were expelled from Pavia in 1785, Augustine's ark and relics were brought to Pavia Cathedral in 1799. San Pietro fell into disrepair but was restored in the 1870s at the urging of Agostino Gaetano Riboldi. It was reconsecrated in 1896 when the relics of Augustine and the shrine were once again reinstalled.

In 1842, a portion of Augustine's right arm (cubitus) was secured from Pavia and returned to Annaba. It now rests in the Saint Augustin Basilica within a glass tube inserted into the arm of a life-size marble statue of Augustine.

== Theology ==
Augustine's large contribution of writings covered diverse fields including theology, philosophy and sociology. Along with John Chrysostom, Augustine was among the most prolific scholars of the early church by quantity.

=== Christian anthropology ===
Augustine was one of the first Christian ancient Latin authors with a very clear vision of theological anthropology. He saw the human being as a perfect unity of soul and body. In his late treatise On Care to Be Had for the Dead, section 5 (420) he exhorted respect for the body on the grounds it belonged to the very nature of the human person. Augustine's favourite figure to describe body–soul unity is marriage: caro tua, coniunx tua – your body is your wife.

Augustine believed that though initially the two elements of body and soul were in perfect harmony, after the fall of humanity they came into dramatic combat with one another. He wrote of them as two categorically different things: the body as a three-dimensional object composed of the four elements, and the soul as spatially dimensionless. He further defined the soul as a kind of substance, participating in reason, fit for ruling the body.

Augustine was not preoccupied, as Plato and Descartes were, in detailed efforts to explain the metaphysics of the soul-body union. It sufficed for him to admit they are metaphysically distinct: to be a human is to be a composite of soul and body, with the soul superior to the body. The latter statement is grounded in his hierarchical classification of things into those that merely exist, those that exist and live, and those that exist, live, and have intelligence or reason.

Sermons directed at Manichaeism focused on their error of teaching the soul was part of God instead of admission that the soul is 'full of illusions'.

Like other Church Fathers such as Athenagoras, Tertullian, Clement of Alexandria and Basil of Caesarea, Augustine "vigorously condemned the practice of induced abortion", and although he disapproved of abortion during any stage of pregnancy, he made a distinction between early and later abortions. He acknowledged the distinction between "formed" and "unformed" fetuses mentioned in the Septuagint translation of Exodus 21:22–23, which incorrectly translates the word "harm" (from the original Hebrew text) as "form" in the Koine Greek of the Septuagint. His view was based on the Aristotelian distinction "between the fetus before and after its supposed 'vivification'". Therefore, he did not classify the abortion of an "unformed" fetus as murder since he thought it could not be known with certainty the fetus had received a soul.

Augustine held that "the timing of the infusion of the soul was a mystery known to God alone". However, he considered procreation as "one of the goods of marriage; abortion figured as a means, along with drugs which cause sterility, of frustrating this good. It lay along a continuum which included infanticide as an instance of 'lustful cruelty' or 'cruel lust.' Augustine called the use of means to avoid the birth of a child an 'evil work:' a reference to either abortion or contraception or both."

=== Creation ===
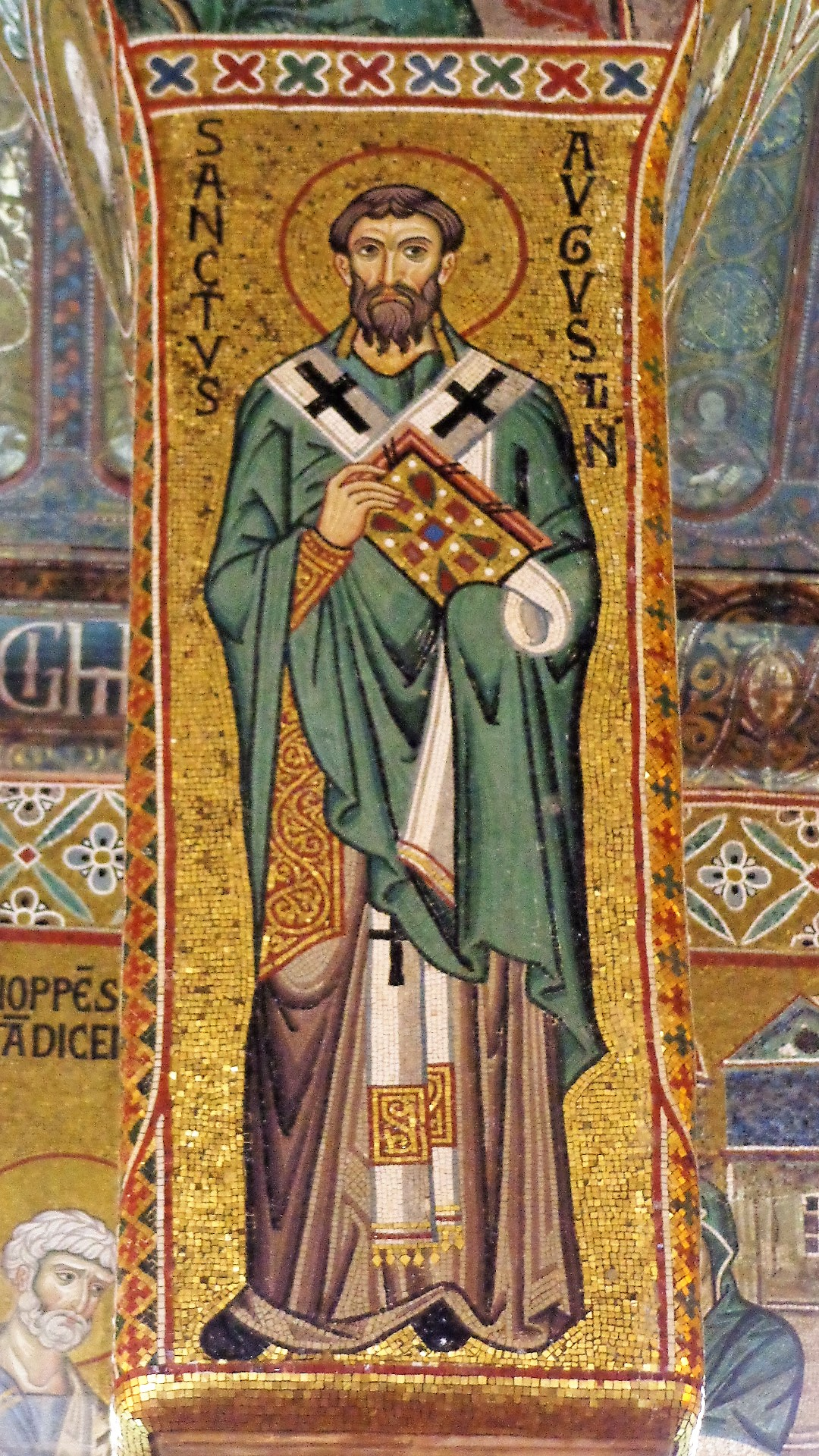
Mosaic of Augustine from the Cappella Palatina in Palermo, Italy (1140)

In City of God, Augustine rejected both the contemporary ideas of ages (such as those of certain Greeks and Egyptians) that differed from the Church's sacred writings. In The Literal Interpretation of Genesis, Augustine argued that God had created everything in the universe simultaneously and not over a period of six days. He argued the six-day structure of creation presented in the Book of Genesis represents a logical framework, rather than the passage of time in a physical way – it would bear a spiritual, rather than physical, meaning, which is no less literal. One reason for this interpretation is the passage in Sirach 18:1, creavit omnia simul ("He created all things at once"), which Augustine took as proof that the days of Genesis 1 had to be taken non-literalistically. As additional support for describing the six days of creation as a heuristic device, Augustine thought the actual event of creation would be incomprehensible by humans and therefore needed to be translated.

Augustine also does not envision original sin as causing structural changes in the universe, and even suggests that the bodies of Adam and Eve were already created mortal before the Fall. Apart from his specific views, Augustine recognized that interpreting the creation story was difficult, and remarked that interpretations could change should new information come up.

=== Ecclesiology ===
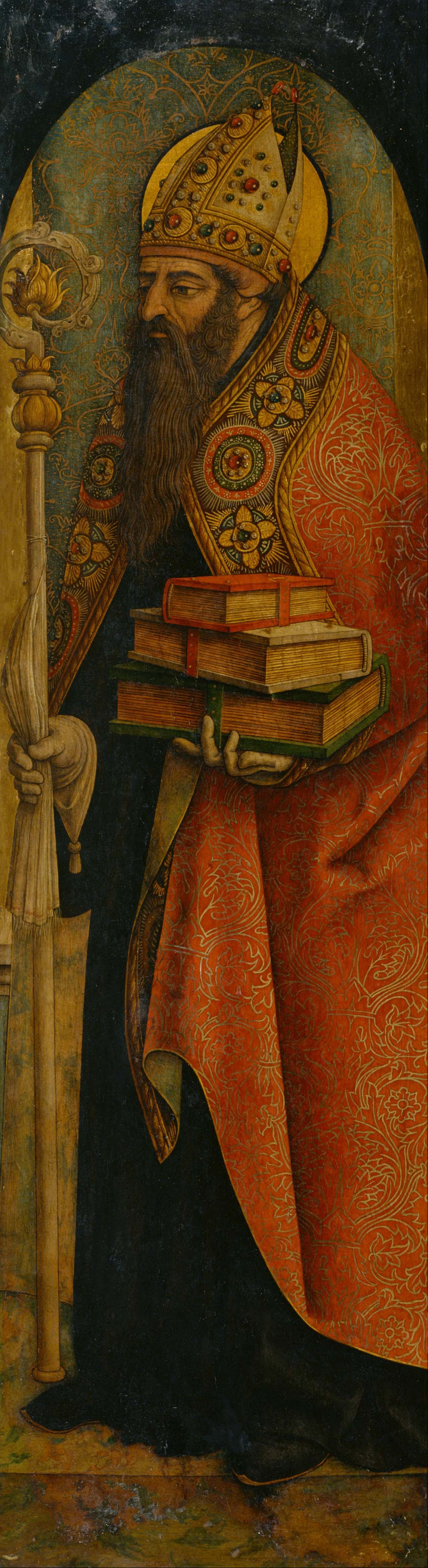
St. Augustine by Carlo Crivelli

Augustine developed his doctrine of the Church principally in reaction to the Donatist sect. He taught there is one Church, but within this Church there are two realities, namely, the visible aspect (the institutional hierarchy, the Catholic sacraments, and the laity) and the invisible (the souls of those in the Church, who are either dead, sinful members or elect predestined for Heaven). The former is the institutional body established by Christ on earth which proclaims salvation and administers the sacraments, while the latter is the invisible body of the elect, made up of genuine believers from all ages, who are known only to God. The Church, which is visible and societal, will be made up of "wheat" and "tares", that is, good and wicked people (as per Mat. 13:30), until the end of time. This concept countered the Donatist claim that only those in a state of grace were the "true" or "pure" church on earth, and that priests and bishops who were not in a state of grace had no authority or ability to confect the sacraments.

Augustine's ecclesiology was more fully developed in City of God. There he conceives of the church as a heavenly city or kingdom, ruled by love, which will ultimately triumph over all earthly empires which are self-indulgent and ruled by pride. Augustine followed Cyprian in teaching that bishops and priests of the Church are the successors of the Apostles, and their authority in the Church is God-given.

The concept of Church invisible was advocated by Augustine as part of his refutation of the Donatist sect, though he, as other Church Fathers before him, saw the invisible Church and visible Church as one and the same thing, unlike the later Protestant reformers who did not identify the Catholic Church as the true church. He was strongly influenced by the Platonist belief that true reality is invisible and that, if the visible reflects the invisible, it does so only partially and imperfectly (see Theory of Forms). Others question whether Augustine really held to some form of an "invisible true Church" concept.

=== Eschatology ===
Augustine originally believed in premillennialism, namely that Christ would establish a literal 1,000-year kingdom prior to the general resurrection, but later rejected the belief, viewing it as carnal. During the medieval period, the Catholic Church built its system of eschatology on Augustinian amillennialism, where Christ rules the earth spiritually through his triumphant church.

During the Reformation, theologians such as John Calvin accepted amillennialism. Augustine taught that the eternal fate of the soul is determined at death, and that purgatorial fires of the intermediate state purify only those who died in communion with the Church. His teaching provided fuel for later theology.

=== Mariology ===
Although Augustine did not develop an independent Mariology, his statements on Mary surpass in number and depth those of other early writers. Even before the Council of Ephesus, he defended the Ever-Virgin Mary as the Mother of God, believing her to be "full of grace" (following earlier Latin writers such as Jerome) on account of her sexual integrity and innocence. Likewise, he affirmed that the Virgin Mary "conceived as virgin, gave birth as virgin and stayed virgin forever".

=== Natural knowledge and biblical interpretation ===
Augustine took the view that, if a literal interpretation contradicts science and humans' God-given reason, the biblical text should be interpreted metaphorically. While each passage of Scripture has a literal sense, this "literal sense" does not always mean the Scriptures are mere history; at times they are rather an extended metaphor.

=== Original sin ===
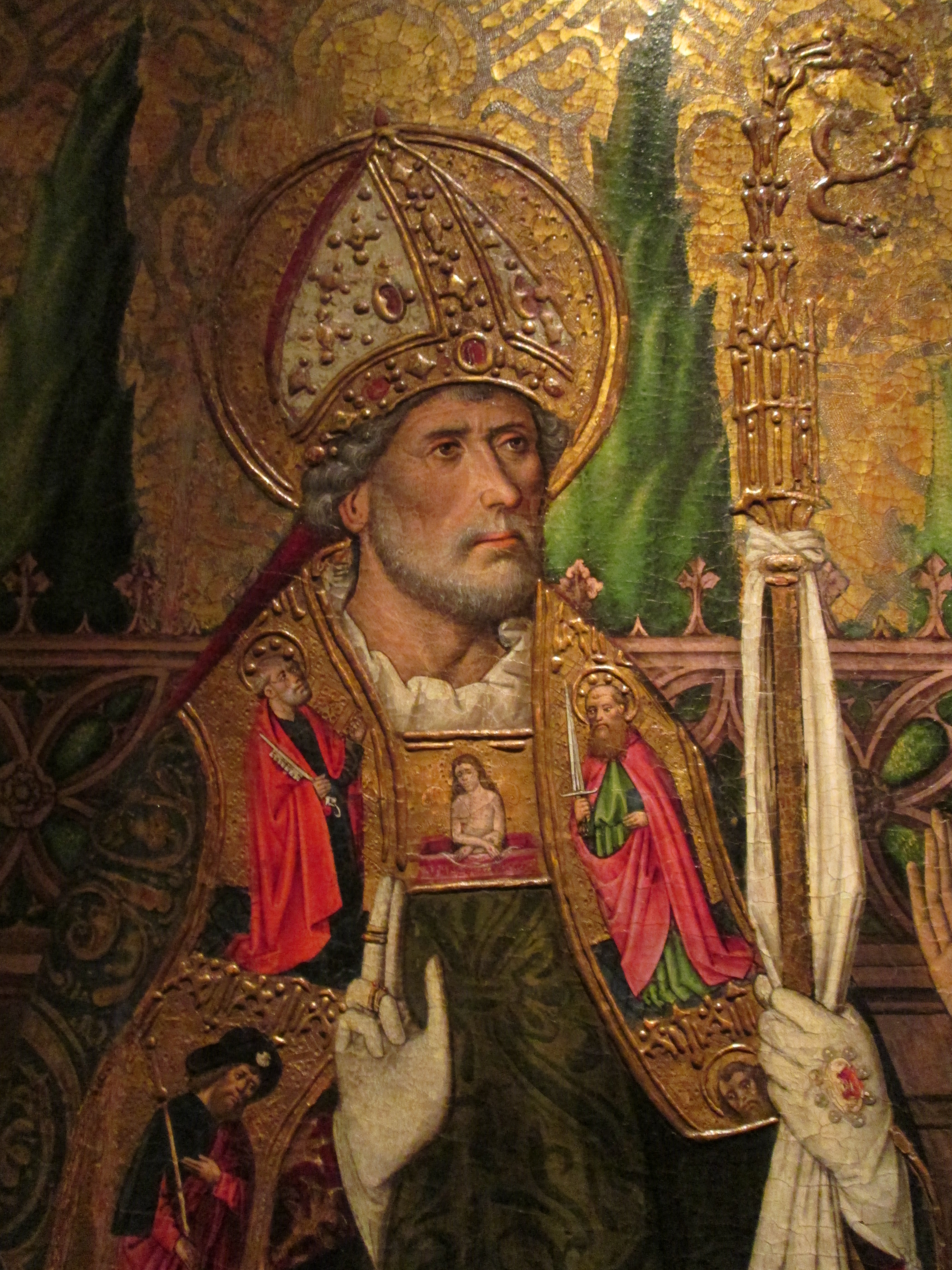
Painting of Augustine (1458) by Tomás Giner, tempera on panel, Diocesan Museum of Zaragoza, Aragon, Spain

Augustine taught that the sin of Adam and Eve was either an act of foolishness (insipientia) followed by pride and disobedience to God or that pride came first. (Note: He explained to Julian of Eclanum that it was a most subtle job to discern what came first: Sed si disputatione subtilissima et elimatissima opus est, ut sciamus utrum primos homines insipientia superbos, an insipientes superbia fecerit. (Contra Julianum, V, 4.18; PL 44, 795)) The first couple disobeyed God, who had told them not to eat of the Tree of the knowledge of good and evil (Gen 2:17). The tree was a symbol of the order of creation. Self-centeredness made Adam and Eve eat of it, thus failing to acknowledge and respect the world as it was created by God, with its hierarchy of beings and values. (Note: Augustine explained it in this way: "Why therefore is it enjoined upon mind, that it should know itself? I suppose, in order that, it may consider itself, and live according to its own nature; that is, seek to be regulated according to its own nature, viz., under Him to whom it ought to be subject, and above those things to which it is to be preferred; under Him by whom it ought to be ruled, above those things which it ought to rule. For it does many things through vicious desire, as though in forgetfulness of itself. For it sees some things intrinsically excellent, in that more excellent nature which is God: and whereas it ought to remain steadfast that it may enjoy them, it is turned away from Him, by wishing to appropriate those things to itself, and not to be like to Him by His gift, but to be what He is by its own, and it begins to move and slip gradually down into less and less, which it thinks to be more and more." ("On the Trinity" (De Trinitate), 5:7; CCL 50, 320 [1–12]))

Augustine wrote that Adam and Eve would not have fallen into pride and lack of wisdom if Satan had not sown into their senses "the root of evil" (radix Mali). Their nature was wounded, according to Augustine, by concupiscence or libido, which affected human intelligence and will, as well as affections and desires, including sexual desire. (Note: In one of Augustine's late works, Retractationes, he made a significant remark indicating the way he understood the difference between spiritual, moral libido and the sexual desire: "Libido is not good and righteous use of the libido" ("libido non-est bonus et rectus usus libidinis"). See the whole passage: Dixi etiam quodam loco: «Quod enim est cibus ad salutem hominis, hoc est concubitus ad salutem generis, et utrumque non-est sine delectatione carnali, quae tamen modificata et temperantia refrenante in usum naturalem redacta, libido esse non-potest». Quod ideo dictum est, quoniam "libido non-est bonus et rectus usus libidinis". Sicut enim malum est male uti bonis, ita bonum bene uti malis. De qua re alias, maxime contra novos haereticos Pelagianos, diligentius disputavi. Cf. De bono coniugali, 16.18; PL 40, 385; De nuptiis et concupiscentia, II, 21.36; PL 44, 443; Contra Iulianum, III, 7.16; PL 44, 710; ibid., V, 16.60; PL 44, 817. See also Idem (1983). Le mariage chrétien dans l'oeuvre de Saint Augustin. Une théologie baptismale de la vie conjugale. Paris: Études Augustiniennes. p. 97.) In terms of metaphysics, Augustine found concupiscence to be not a state of being but a bad quality, the privation of good or a wound.

Augustine's understanding of the consequences of original sin and the necessity of redeeming grace was developed in the struggle against Pelagius and his Pelagian disciples, Caelestius and Julian of Eclanum, who had been inspired by Rufinus of Syria, a disciple of Theodore of Mopsuestia. They refused to agree original sin wounded human will and mind, insisting human nature was given the power to act, to speak, and to think when God created it. Human nature cannot lose its moral capacity for doing good, but a person is free to act or not act in a righteous way. Pelagius gave an example of eyes: they have capacity for seeing, but a person can make either good or bad use of it.

Pelagians insisted human affections and desires were not touched by the fall either. In the Pelagian view, immorality, e.g. fornication, is exclusively a matter of will, i.e. a person does not use natural desires in a proper way. In opposition, Augustine pointed out the apparent disobedience of the flesh to the spirit, and explained it as one of the results of original sin, punishment of Adam and Eve's disobedience to God.

Augustine had served as a "Hearer" for the Manichaeans for about nine years, who taught that the original sin was carnal knowledge. But his struggle to understand the cause of evil in the world started before that, at the age of nineteen. By malum (evil) he understood most of all concupiscence, which he interpreted as a vice dominating people and causing in men and women moral disorder. Agostino Trapè insists Augustine's personal experience cannot be credited for his doctrine about concupiscence. He considers Augustine's marital experience to be quite normal, and even exemplary, aside from the absence of Christian wedding rites. As J. Brachtendorf showed, Augustine used Ciceronian Stoic concept of passions, to interpret Paul's doctrine of universal sin and redemption.

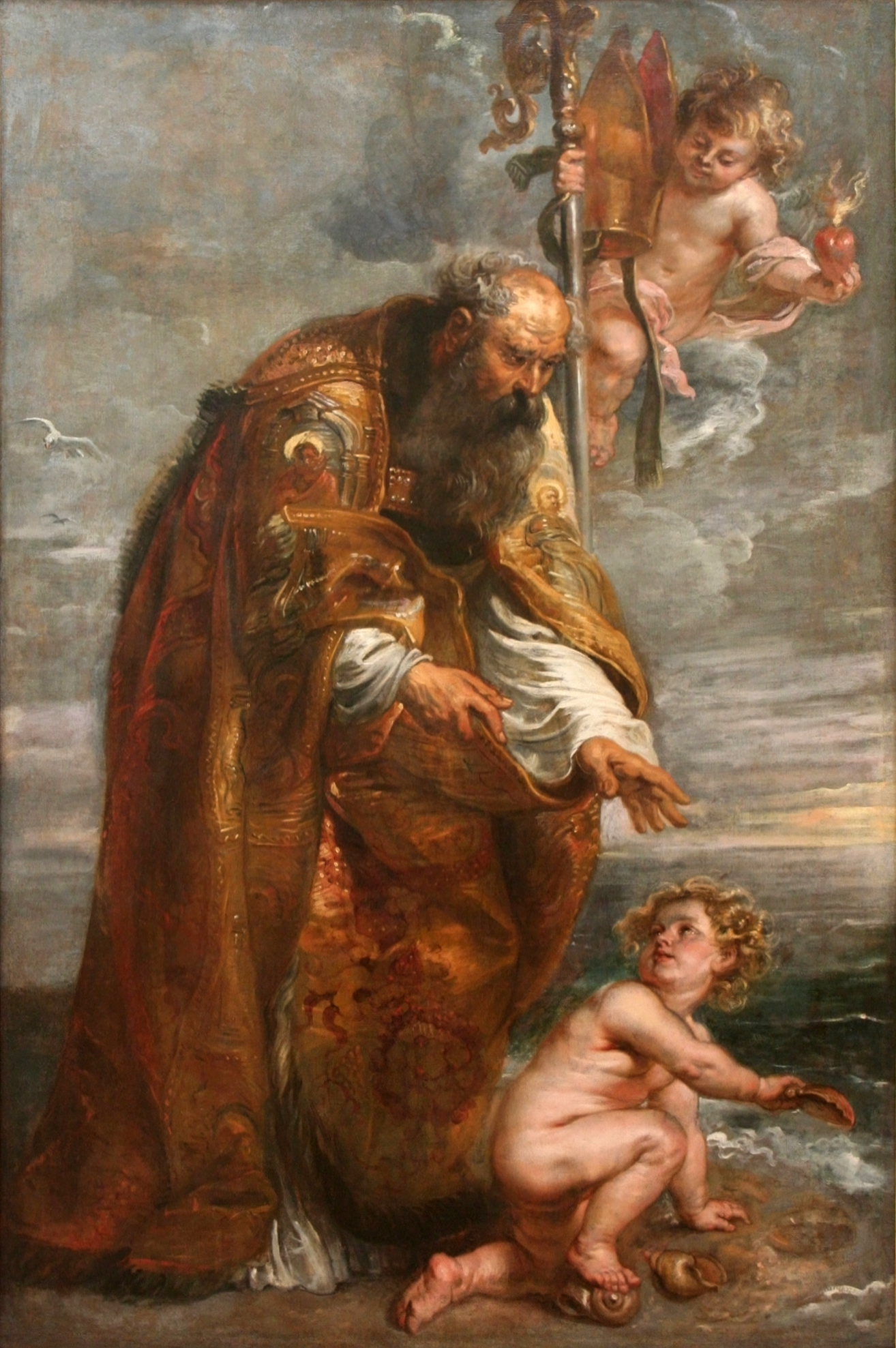
St. Augustine by Peter Paul Rubens

The view that not only human soul but also senses were influenced by the fall of Adam and Eve was prevalent in Augustine's time among the Fathers of the Church. It is clear the reason for Augustine's distancing from the affairs of the flesh was different from that of Plotinus, a Neoplatonist (Note: Although Augustine praises him in the Confessions, 8.2., it is widely acknowledged that Augustine's attitude towards that pagan philosophy was very much of a Christian apostle, as Clarke 1958, p. 151 writes: Towards Neoplatonism there was throughout his life a decidedly ambivalent attitude; one must expect both agreement and sharp dissent, derivation but also repudiation. In the matter which concerns us here, the agreement with Neoplatonism (and with the Platonic tradition in general) centres on two related notions: immutability as the primary characteristic of divinity, and likeness to divinity as the primary vocation of the soul. The disagreement chiefly concerned, as we have said, two related and central Christian dogmas: the Incarnation of the Son of God and the resurrection of the flesh. Cf. É. Schmitt's chapter 2: L'idéologie hellénique et la conception augustinienne de réalités charnelles in: Idem (1983). Le mariage chrétien dans l'oeuvre de Saint Augustin. Une théologie baptismale de la vie conjugale. Paris: Études Augustiniennes. pp. 108–123. O'Meara, J.J. (1954). The Young Augustine: The Growth of St. Augustine's Mind up to His Conversion. London. pp. 143–151 and 195f. Madec, G. Le 'platonisme' des Pères. p. 42. in Idem (1994). Petites Études Augustiniennes. «Antiquité» 142. Paris: Collection d'Études Augustiniennes. pp. 27–50. Thomas Aq. STh I q84 a5; Augustine of Hippo, City of God (De Civitate Dei), VIII, 5; CCL 47, 221 [3–4].) who taught that only through disdain for fleshly desire could one reach the ultimate state of mankind. Augustine taught the redemption, i.e. transformation and purification, of the body in the resurrection.

Some authors perceive Augustine's doctrine as directed against human sexuality and attribute his insistence on continence and devotion to God as coming from his need to reject his own highly sensual nature as described in the Confessions. (Note: "It is, of course, always easier to oppose and denounce than to understand.") Augustine taught that human sexuality has been wounded, together with the whole of human nature, and requires redemption of Christ. That healing is a process realized in conjugal acts. The virtue of continence is achieved thanks to the grace of the sacrament of Christian marriage, which becomes therefore a remedium concupiscentiae – remedy of concupiscence. The redemption of human sexuality will be, however, fully accomplished only in the resurrection of the body.

Augustine also taught that the sin of Adam is inherited by all human beings. Already in his pre-Pelagian writings, Augustine taught that Original Sin is transmitted to his descendants by concupiscence, which he regarded as the passion of both soul and body, (Note: In 393 or 394 he commented: Moreover, if unbelief is fornication, and idolatry unbelief, and covetousness idolatry, it is not to be doubted that covetousness also is fornication. Who, then, in that case can rightly separate any unlawful lust whatever from the category of fornication, if covetousness is fornication? And from this we perceive, that because of unlawful lusts, not only those of which one is guilty in acts of uncleanness with another's husband or wife, but any unlawful lusts whatever, which cause the soul to make a bad use of the body to wander from the law of God, and to be ruinously and basely corrupted, a man may, without crime, put away his wife, and a wife her husband, because the Lord makes the cause of fornication an exception; which fornication, in accordance with the above considerations, we are compelled to understand as being general and universal. ("On the Sermon on the Mount", De sermone Domini in monte, 1:16:46; CCL 35, 52).) making humanity a massa damnata (mass of perdition, condemned crowd) and much enfeebling, though not destroying, the freedom of the will. Although earlier Christian authors taught the elements of physical death, moral weakness, and a sin propensity within original sin, Augustine was the first to add the concept of inherited guilt (reatus) from Adam whereby an infant was eternally damned at birth.

Although Augustine's anti-Pelagian defence of original sin was confirmed at numerous councils, i.e. Carthage (418), Ephesus (431), Orange (529), Trent (1546) and by popes, i.e. Pope Innocent I (401–417) and Pope Zosimus (417–418), his inherited guilt eternally damning infants was omitted by these councils and popes. Anselm of Canterbury established in his Cur Deus Homo the definition that was followed by the great 13th-century Schoolmen, namely that Original Sin is the "privation of the righteousness which every man ought to possess," thus separating it from concupiscence, with which some of Augustine's disciples had identified it, as later did Luther and Calvin. In 1567, Pope Pius V condemned the identification of Original Sin with concupiscence.

=== Predestination ===
Augustine taught that God orders all things while preserving human freedom. Prior to 396, he believed predestination was based on God's foreknowledge of whether individuals would believe in Christ, that God's grace was "a reward for human assent". Later, in response to Pelagius, Augustine said that the sin of pride consists in assuming "we are the ones who choose God or that God chooses us (in his foreknowledge) because of something worthy in us", and argued that God's grace causes the individual act of faith.

Scholars are divided over whether Augustine's teaching implies double predestination, or the belief God chooses some people for damnation as well as some for salvation. Catholic scholars tend to deny he held such a view while some Protestants and secular scholars have held that Augustine did believe in double predestination. About 412, Augustine became the first Christian to understand predestination as a divine unilateral pre-determination of individuals' eternal destinies independently of human choice, although his prior Manichaean sect did teach this concept. Some Protestant theologians, such as Justo L. González and Bengt Hägglund, interpret Augustine's teaching that grace is irresistible, results in conversion, and leads to perseverance.

In On Rebuke and Grace (De correptione et gratia), Augustine wrote: "And what is written, that He wills all men to be saved, while yet all men are not saved, may be understood in many ways, some of which I have mentioned in other writings of mine; but here I will say one thing: He wills all men to be saved, is so said that all the predestinated may be understood by it, because every kind of men is among them."

Speaking of the twins Jacob and Esau, Augustine wrote in his book On the Gift of Perseverance, "[I]t ought to be a most certain fact that the former is of the predestinated, the latter is not."

=== Sacramental theology ===
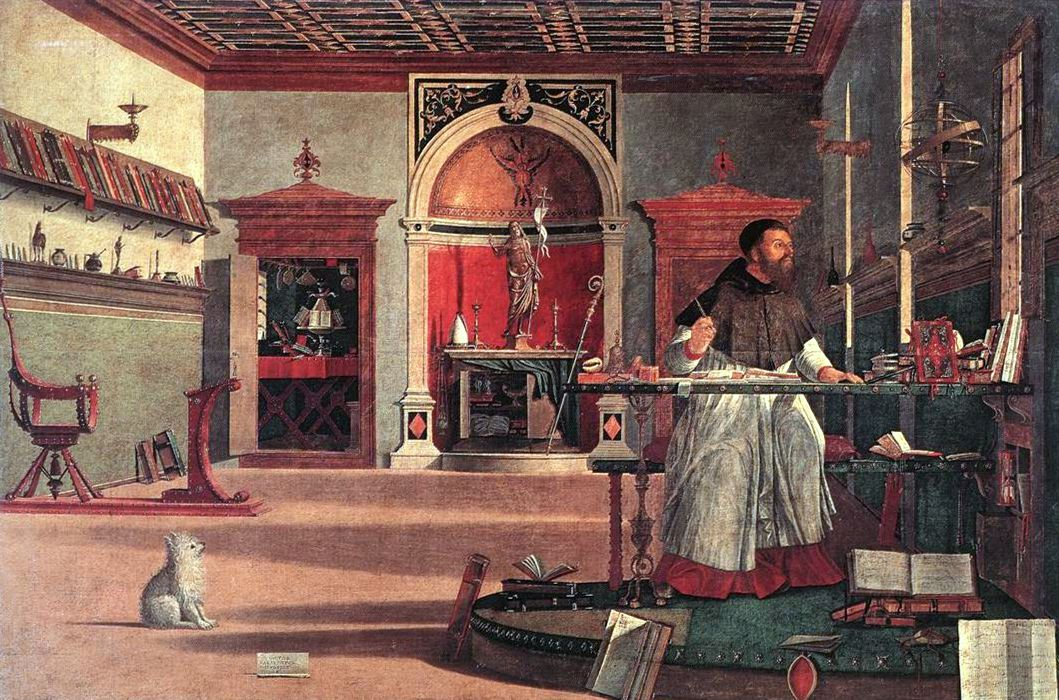
St. Augustine in His Study by Vittore Carpaccio, 1502

Also in reaction to the Donatists, Augustine developed a distinction between the "regularity" and "validity" of the sacraments. Regular sacraments are performed by clergy of the Catholic Church, while sacraments performed by schismatics are considered irregular. Nevertheless, the validity of the sacraments does not depend upon the holiness of the priests who perform them (ex opere operato); therefore, irregular sacraments are still accepted as valid provided they are done in the name of Christ and in the manner prescribed by the Church. On this point, Augustine departs from the earlier teaching of Cyprian, who taught that converts from schismatic movements must be re-baptised. Augustine taught that sacraments administered outside the Catholic Church, though true sacraments, avail nothing. However, he also stated that baptism, while it does not confer any grace when done outside the Church, does confer grace as soon as one is received into the Catholic Church.

Augustine believed that in a real presence of Christ in the Eucharist, saying that Christ's statement, "This is my body" referred to the bread he carried in his hands, and that Christians must have faith the bread and wine are in fact the body and blood of Christ, despite what they see with their eyes. For instance, he stated that "He [Jesus] walked here in the same flesh, and gave us the same flesh to be eaten unto salvation. But no one eats that flesh unless first he adores it; and thus it is discovered how such a footstool of the Lord's feet is adored; and not only do we not sin by adoring, we do sin by not adoring." Presbyterian professor and author John Riggs argued that Augustine held that Christ is really present in the elements of the Eucharist, but not in a bodily manner, because his body remains in Heaven.

Against the Pelagians, Augustine strongly stressed the importance of infant baptism. About the question whether baptism is an absolute necessity for salvation, however, Augustine appears to have refined his beliefs during his lifetime, causing some confusion among later theologians about his position. He said in one of his sermons that only the baptized are saved. This belief was shared by many early Christians. However, a passage from his City of God, concerning the Apocalypse, may indicate Augustine did believe in an exception for children born to Christian parents.

== Philosophy ==
=== Astrology ===
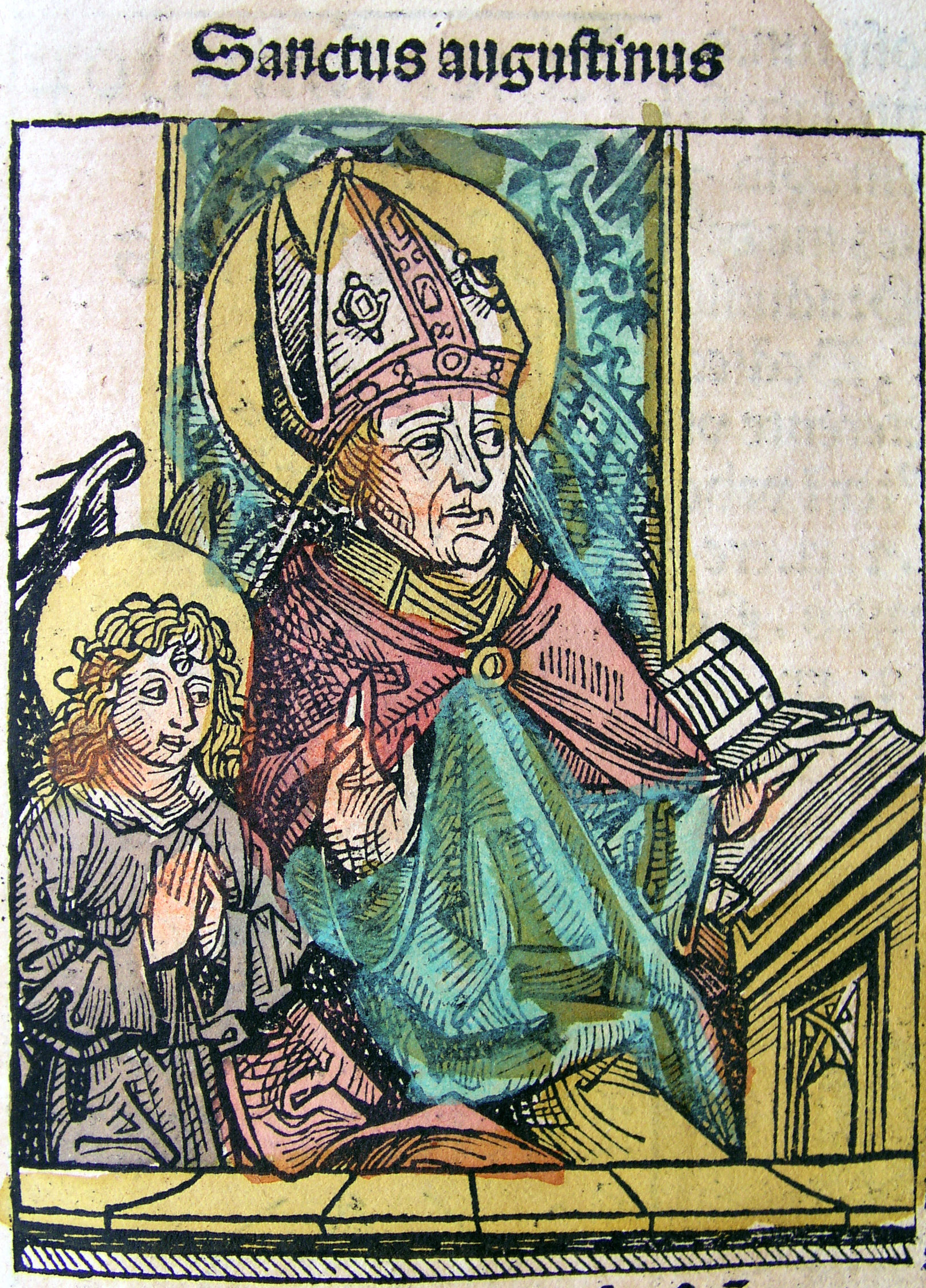
Saint Augustine in the Nuremberg Chronicle

Augustine's contemporaries often believed astrology to be an exact and genuine science. Its practitioners were regarded as true men of learning and called mathematici. Astrology played a prominent part in Manichaean doctrine, and Augustine himself was attracted by their books in his youth, being particularly fascinated by those who claimed to foretell the future. Later, as a bishop, he warned that one should avoid astrologers who combine science and horoscopes. (Augustine's term "mathematici", meaning "astrologers", is sometimes mistranslated as "mathematicians".) According to Augustine, they were not genuine students of Hipparchus or Eratosthenes but "common swindlers".

=== Epistemology ===
Epistemological concerns shaped Augustine's intellectual development. His early dialogues Contra academicos (386) and De Magistro (389), both written shortly after his conversion to Christianity, reflect his engagement with sceptical arguments and show the development of his doctrine of divine illumination. The doctrine of illumination claims God plays an active and regular part in human perception and understanding by illuminating the mind so human beings can recognize intelligible realities God presents (as opposed to God designing the human mind to be reliable consistently, as in, for example, Descartes's idea of clear and distinct perceptions). According to Augustine, illumination is obtainable to all rational minds and is different from other forms of sense perception. It is meant to be an explanation of the conditions required for the mind to have a connection with intelligible entities.

Augustine also posed the problem of other minds throughout different works, most famously perhaps in On the Trinity (VIII.6.9), and developed what has come to be a standard solution: the argument from analogy to other minds. In contrast to Plato and other earlier philosophers, Augustine recognized the centrality of testimony to human knowledge and argued that what others tell us can provide knowledge even if we do not have independent reasons to believe their testimonial reports.

=== Just war theory ===
Augustine asserted Christians should be pacifists as a personal, philosophical stance. However, peacefulness in the face of a grave wrong that could only be stopped by violence would be a sin. Defence of one's self or others could be a necessity, especially when authorized by a legitimate authority. While not breaking down the conditions necessary for war to be just, Augustine coined the phrase in his work The City of God. In essence, the pursuit of peace must include the option of fighting for its long-term preservation. Such a war could not be pre-emptive, but defensive, to restore peace. Thomas Aquinas, centuries later, used the authority of Augustine's arguments in an attempt to define the conditions under which a war could be just.

=== Free will ===
Included in Augustine's earlier theodicy is the claim God created humans and angels as rational beings possessing free will. Free will was not intended for sin, meaning it is not equally predisposed to both good and evil. A will defiled by sin is not considered as "free" as it once was because it is bound by material things, which could be lost or be difficult to part with, resulting in unhappiness. Sin impairs free will, while grace restores it. Only a will that was once free can be subjected to sin's corruption. After 412, Augustine changed his theology, teaching that humanity had no free will to believe in Christ but only a free will to sin: "I in fact strove on behalf of the free choice of the human 'will,' but God's grace conquered" (Retract. 2.1).

The early Christians opposed the deterministic views (e.g., fate) of Stoics, Gnostics, and Manichaeans prevalent in the first four centuries. Christians championed the concept of a relational God who interacts with humans rather than a Stoic or Gnostic God who unilaterally foreordained every event (yet Stoics still claimed to teach free will). Patristics scholar Ken Wilson argues that every early Christian author with extant writings who wrote on the topic prior to Augustine of Hippo (412) advanced human free choice rather than a deterministic God. According to Wilson, Augustine taught traditional free choice until 412, when he reverted to his earlier Manichaean and Stoic deterministic training when battling the Pelagians. Only a few Christians accepted Augustine's view of free will until the Protestant Reformation when both Luther and Calvin embraced Augustine's deterministic teachings wholeheartedly.

The Catholic Church considers Augustine's teaching to be consistent with free will. He often said that anyone can be saved if they wish. While God knows who will and will not be saved, with no possibility for the latter to be saved in their lives, this knowledge represents God's perfect knowledge of how humans will freely choose their destinies.

=== Ethics ===
==== Natural law ====
Augustine was among the earliest to examine the legitimacy of the laws of man, and attempt to define the boundaries of what laws and rights occur naturally, instead of being arbitrarily imposed by mortals. All who have wisdom and conscience, he concludes, are able to use reason to recognize the lex naturalis, natural law. Mortal law should not attempt to force people to do what is right or avoid what is wrong, but simply to remain just. Therefore "an unjust law is no law at all". People are not obligated to obey laws that are unjust, those that their conscience and reason tell them violate natural law and rights.

==== Slavery ====
Augustine led many clergy under his authority at Hippo to free their slaves as a "pious and holy" act. He boldly wrote a letter urging the emperor to set up a new law against slave traders and was very much concerned about the sale of children. Christian emperors of his time for 25 years had permitted the sale of children, not because they approved of the practice, but as a way of preventing infanticide when parents were unable to care for a child. Augustine noted that the tenant farmers in particular were driven to hire out or to sell their children as a means of survival.

In his book, The City of God, he presents the development of slavery as a product of sin and as contrary to God's divine plan. He wrote that God "did not intend that this rational creature, who was made in his image, should have dominion over anything but the irrational creation – not man over man, but man over the beasts". Thus he wrote that righteous men in primitive times were made shepherds of cattle, not kings over men. "The condition of slavery is the result of sin", he declared. In The City of God, Augustine wrote he felt the existence of slavery was a punishment for the existence of sin, even if an individual enslaved person committed no sin meriting punishment. He wrote: "Slavery is, however, penal, and is appointed by that law which enjoins the preservation of the natural order and forbids its disturbance." Augustine believed slavery did more harm to the slave owner than the enslaved person himself: "the lowly position does as much good to the servant as the proud position does harm to the master." Augustine proposes as a solution to sin a type of cognitive reimagining of one's situation, where slaves "may themselves make their slavery in some sort free, by serving not in crafty fear, but in faithful love," until the end of the world eradicated slavery for good: "until all unrighteousness pass away, and all principality and every human power be brought to nothing, and God be all in all."

==== Jews ====
After Christianity became the state religion of the Roman Empire, it was seen as the fulfillment of Old Testament prophecies and as evidence of Christianity's truth over Judaism. The destruction of the Second Temple and the resulting Jewish exile were often viewed as divine punishment for the Jewish rejection of Jesus and led to Christian thinkers to grapple with the presence of Jewish continued existence in their midst. In this context, Augustine developed a theological justification of Jewish presence within a Christian society that came to be known as the witness theory of the Jewish diaspora. Against certain Christian movements, some of which rejected the use of Hebrew Scripture, Augustine countered that God had chosen the Jews as a special people, and he considered the scattering of Jewish people by the Roman Empire to be a fulfilment of prophecy as well as punishment for their rejection of Christ. Nevertheless, Jews should not be slain or forcibly converted because they provide Christianity with an ever-present witness to its own validity as their own scriptures, the Old Testament, foretold the coming and resurrection of Christ. Their blind adherence to the Old Testament were proof that Christians had not faked the claims in the New Testament, although the Jews remained blind to the truth. Especially relevant for Augustine's justification was Psalm 59:11 "Slay them not, lest at some time they for get your Law". Augustine, who believed Jewish people would be converted to Christianity at "the end of time", argued God had allowed them to survive their dispersion as a warning to Christians; as such, he argued, they should be permitted to dwell in Christian lands.

The sentiment sometimes attributed to Augustine that Christians should let the Jews "survive but not thrive" (it is repeated by the author James Carroll in his book Constantine's Sword, for example) is apocryphal and is not found in any of his writings. Augustine's theological justification became the Catholic Church's official policy through the endorsement of pope Gregory the Great in the sixth century and allowed Jews to live in relative safety among their Christian hosts up until the twelfth century.

==== Sexuality and the sexes ====
For Augustine, the evil of sexual immorality was not in the sexual act itself, but in the emotions that typically accompany it. In On Christian Doctrine Augustine contrasts love, which is enjoyment on account of God, and lust, which is not on account of God. Augustine claims that, following the Fall, sexual lust (concupiscentia) has become necessary for copulation (as required to stimulate male erection), sexual lust is an evil result of the Fall, and therefore, evil must inevitably accompany sexual intercourse (On marriage and concupiscence). Therefore, following the Fall, even marital sex carried out merely to procreate inevitably perpetuates evil (On marriage and concupiscence 1.27; A Treatise against Two Letters of the Pelagians 2.27). For Augustine, proper love exercises a denial of selfish pleasure and the subjugation of corporeal desire to God. The only way to avoid evil caused by sexual intercourse is to take the "better" way (Confessions 8.2) and abstain from marriage (On marriage and concupiscence 1.31). Sex within marriage is not, however, for Augustine a sin, although necessarily produces the evil of sexual lust. Based on the same logic, Augustine also declared the pious virgins raped during the sack of Rome to be innocent because they did not intend to sin nor enjoy the act.

Before the Fall, Augustine believed sex was a passionless affair, "just like many a laborious work accomplished by the compliant operation of our other limbs, without any lascivious heat", that the seed "might be sown without any shameful lust, the genital members simply obeying the inclination of the will". After the Fall, by contrast, the penis cannot be controlled by mere will, subject instead to both unwanted impotence and involuntary erections. Augustine censured those who try to prevent the creation of offspring when engaging in sexual relations, saying that though they may be nominally married they are not really, but are using that designation as a cloak for turpitude.

Augustine believed Adam and Eve had both already chosen in their hearts to disobey God's command not to eat of the Tree of Knowledge before Eve took the fruit, ate it, and gave it to Adam. Accordingly, Augustine did not believe Adam was any less guilty of sin. Augustine praises women and their role in society and in the Church. Augustine believed that "woman has been made for man" and that "in sex she is physically subject to him in the same way as our natural impulses need to be subjected to the reasoning power of the mind, in order that the actions to which they lead may be inspired by the principles of good conduct". Women were created as a "helper" to men for Augustine.

==== Pedagogy ====
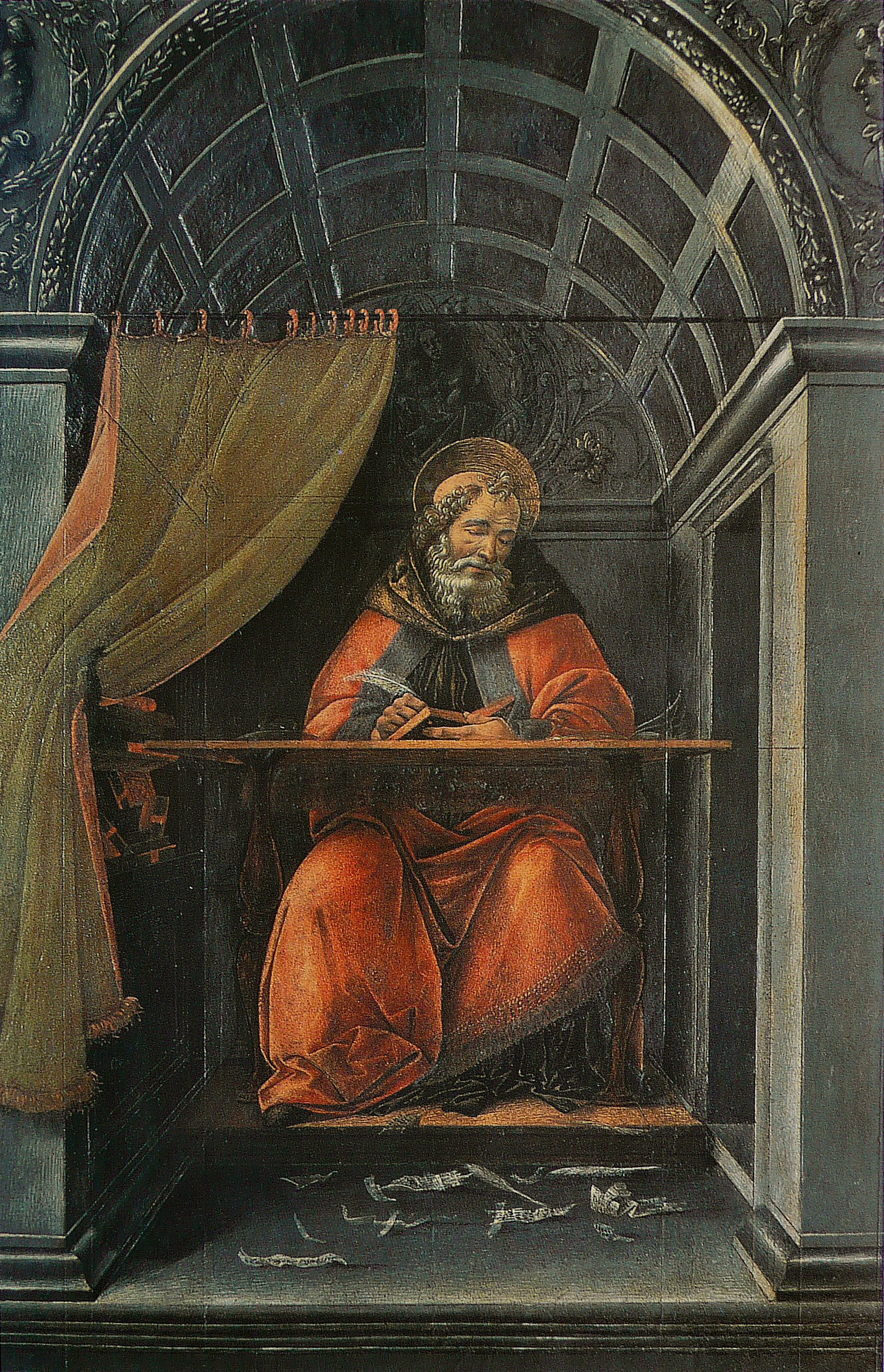
Saint Augustine in His Study, by Sandro Botticelli, 1494, Uffizi Gallery

Augustine is considered an influential figure in the history of education. A work early in Augustine's writings is De Magistro (On the Teacher), which contains insights into education. His ideas changed as he found better directions or better ways of expressing his ideas. In the last years of his life, Augustine wrote his Retractationes (Retractations), reviewing his writings and improving specific texts. Henry Chadwick believes an accurate translation of "retractationes" may be "reconsiderations". Reconsiderations can be seen as an overarching theme of the way Augustine learned. Augustine's understanding of the search for understanding, meaning, and truth as a restless journey leaves room for doubt, development, and change.

Augustine was a strong advocate of critical thinking skills. Because written works were limited during this time, spoken communication of knowledge was very important. His emphasis on the importance of community as a means of learning distinguishes his pedagogy from some others. Augustine believed dialectic is the best means for learning and that this method should serve as a model for learning encounters between teachers and students. Augustine's dialogue writings model the need for lively interactive dialogue among learners. He recommended adapting educational practices to fit the students' educational backgrounds:

- the student who has been well-educated by knowledgeable teachers;
- the student who has had no education; and
- the student who has had a poor education, but believes himself to be well-educated.

If a student has been well educated in a wide variety of subjects, the teacher must be careful not to repeat what they have already learned, but to challenge the student with material they do not yet know thoroughly. With the student who has had no education, the teacher must be patient, willing to repeat things until the student understands, and sympathetic. Perhaps the most difficult student, however, is the one with an inferior education who believes he understands something when he does not. Augustine stressed the importance of showing this type of student the difference between "having words and having understanding" and of helping the student to remain humble with his acquisition of knowledge.

Under the influence of Bede, Alcuin, and Rabanus Maurus, De catechizandis rudibus came to exercise an important role in the education of clergy at the monastic schools, especially from the eighth century onwards.

Augustine believed students should be given an opportunity to apply learned theories to practical experience. Yet another of Augustine's major contributions to education is his study on the styles of teaching. He claimed there are two basic styles a teacher uses when speaking to the students: mixed and grand. The mixed style includes complex and sometimes showy language to help students see the artistry of the subject they are studying, whereas the grand style is not considered quite as elegant. Augustine balanced his teaching philosophy with the traditional Bible-based practice of strict discipline.

Augustine knew Latin and Ancient Greek. He had a long correspondence with St Jerome regarding the textual differences existing between the Hebrew Bible and the Greek Septuagint, concluding that the original Greek manuscripts were closely similar to the other Hebrew ones, and also that even the differences in the two original versions of the Holy Scripture could enlight its spiritual meaning to have been unitarily inspired by God.

Augustine's theological views extended into the centuries that came after his life and were very influential throughout various religious clergy in Europe, and eventually those in the New World. In the American colonies his teachings were foundational to the religious precepts among various prominent figures in The First Great Awakening of the eighteenth century, including Jonathan Edwards and George Whitefield. John Wesley, principle founder of the Methodist Church, also drew heavily on Augustine's teachings.

==== Coercion ====
Augustine of Hippo is one of the very few authors in Antiquity to theoretically examine the ideas of religious freedom and coercion. Augustine handled the infliction of punishment and the exercise of power over law-breakers by analyzing these issues in ways similar to modern debates on penal reform. His teaching on coercion has "embarrassed his modern defenders and vexed his modern detractors," because it is seen as making him appear "to generations of religious liberals as le prince et patriarche de persecuteurs." Brown asserts that, at the same time, Augustine becomes "an eloquent advocate of the ideal of corrective punishment" and reformation of the wrongdoer. Russell says Augustine's theory of coercion "was not crafted from dogma, but in response to a unique historical situation" and is, therefore, context-dependent, while others see it as inconsistent with his other teachings.

===== Context =====
During the Great Persecution, "When Roman soldiers came calling, some of the [Catholic] officials handed over the sacred books, vessels, and other church goods rather than risk legal penalties" over a few objects. Maureen Tilley says this was a problem by 305, that became a schism by 311, because many of the North African Christians had a long established tradition of a "physicalist approach to religion." The sacred scriptures were not simply books to them, but were the Word of God in physical form, therefore they saw handing over the Bible, and handing over a person to be martyred, as "two sides of the same coin." Those who cooperated with the authorities became known as traditores. The term originally meant one who hands over a physical object, but it came to mean "traitor".

According to Tilley, after the persecution ended, those who had apostatized wanted to return to their positions in the church. The North African Christians, the rigorists who became known as Donatists, refused to accept them. Catholics were more tolerant and wanted to wipe the slate clean. For the next 75 years, both parties existed, often directly alongside each other, with a double line of bishops for the same cities. Competition for the loyalty of the people included multiple new churches and violence. (Note: French archaeology has shown the north African landscape of this time period became "covered with a white robe of churches" with Catholics and Donatists building multiple churches with granaries to feed the poor as they competed for the loyalty of the people.) No one is exactly sure when the Circumcellions and the Donatists allied, but for decades, they fomented protests and street violence, accosted travellers and attacked random Catholics without warning, often doing serious and unprovoked bodily harm such as beating people with clubs, cutting off their hands and feet, and gouging out eyes.

Augustine became coadjutor Bishop of Hippo in 395, and since he believed that conversion must be voluntary, his appeals to the Donatists were verbal. For several years, he used popular propaganda, debate, personal appeal, General Councils, appeals to the emperor and political pressure to bring the Donatists back into union with the Catholics, but all attempts failed. The harsh realities Augustine faced can be found in his Letter 28 written to bishop Novatus around 416. Donatists had attacked, cut out the tongue and cut off the hands of a Bishop Rogatus who had recently converted to Catholicism. An unnamed count of Africa had sent his agent with Rogatus, and he too had been attacked; the count was "inclined to pursue the matter." Russell says Augustine demonstrates a "hands-on" involvement with the details of his bishopric, but at one point in the letter, he confesses he does not know what to do. "All the issues that plague him are there: stubborn Donatists, Circumcellion violence, the vacillating role of secular officials, the imperative to persuade, and his own trepidations." The empire responded to the civil unrest with the law and its enforcement, and thereafter, Augustine changed his mind about using verbal arguments alone. Instead, he came to support the state's use of coercion. Augustine did not believe the empire's enforcement would "make the Donatists more virtuous" but he did believe it would make them "less vicious."

===== Theology =====
The primary 'proof-text' of what Augustine thought concerning coercion is from Letter 93, written in 408, as a reply to bishop Vincentius, of Cartenna (Mauretania, North Africa). This letter shows that both practical and biblical reasons led Augustine to defend the legitimacy of coercion. He confesses that he changed his mind because of "the ineffectiveness of dialogue and the proven efficacy of laws." He had been worried about false conversions if force was used, but "now," he says, "it seems imperial persecution is working." Many Donatists had converted. "Fear had made them reflect, and made them docile." Augustine continued to assert that coercion could not directly convert someone, but concluded it could make a person ready to be reasoned with.

According to Mar Marcos, Augustine made use of several biblical examples to legitimize coercion, but the primary analogy in Letter 93 and in Letter 185, is the parable of the Great Feast in Luke 14.15–24 and its statement compel them to come in. Russell says, Augustine uses the Latin term cogo, instead of the compello of the Vulgate, since to Augustine, cogo meant to "gather together" or "collect" and was not simply "compel by physical force."

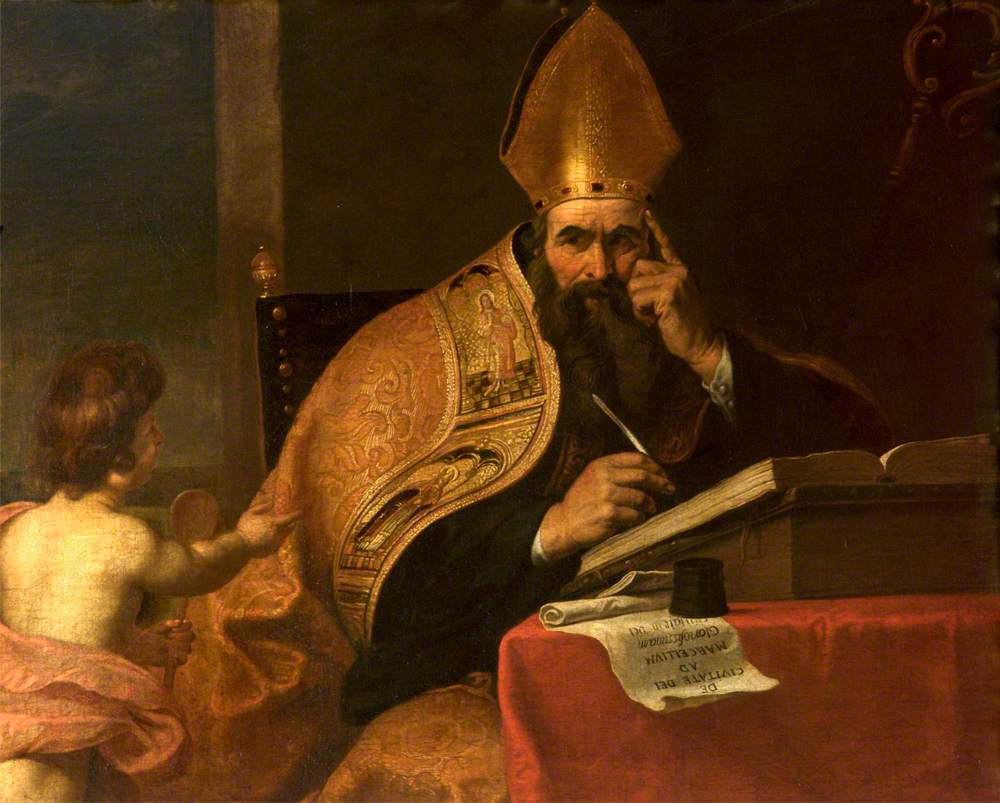
Saint Augustine of Hippo, Gerard Seghers

In 1970, Robert Markus argued that, for Augustine, a degree of external pressure being brought for the purpose of reform was compatible with the exercise of free will. Russell asserts that Confessions 13 is crucial to understanding Augustine's thought on coercion; using Peter Brown's explanation of Augustine's view of salvation, he explains that Augustine's past, his own sufferings and "conversion through God's pressures," along with his biblical hermeneutics, is what led him to see the value in suffering for discerning truth. According to Russell, Augustine saw coercion as one among many conversion strategies for forming "a pathway to the inner person."

In Augustine's view, there is such a thing as just and unjust persecution. Augustine explains that when the purpose of persecution is to lovingly correct and instruct, then it becomes discipline and is just. He said the church would discipline its people out of a loving desire to heal them, and that, "once compelled to come in, heretics would gradually give their voluntary assent to the truth of Christian orthodoxy." Frederick H. Russell describes this as "a pastoral strategy in which the church did the persecuting with the dutiful assistance of Roman authorities," adding that it is "a precariously balanced blend of external discipline and inward nurturance."

Augustine placed limits on the use of coercion, recommending fines, imprisonment, banishment, and moderate floggings, preferring beatings with rods which was a common practice in the ecclesial courts. He opposed severity, maiming, and the execution of heretics. While these limits were mostly ignored by Roman authorities, Michael Lamb says that in doing this, "Augustine appropriates republican principles from his Roman predecessors..." and maintains his commitment to liberty, legitimate authority, and the rule of law as a constraint on arbitrary power. He continues to advocate holding authority accountable to prevent domination but affirms the state's right to act.

Herbert A. Deane, on the other hand, says there is a fundamental inconsistency between Augustine's political thought and "his final position of approval of the use of political and legal weapons to punish religious dissidence" and others have seconded this view. (Note: See: C. Kirwan, Augustine (London, 1989), pp. 209–218; and J. M. Rist. Augustine: Ancient Thought Baptized (Cambridge, 1994), pp. 239–245.) Brown asserts that Augustine's thinking on coercion is more of an attitude than a doctrine since it is "not in a state of rest," but is instead marked by "a painful and protracted attempt to embrace and resolve tensions."

According to Russell, it is possible to see how Augustine himself had evolved from his earlier Confessions to this teaching on coercion and the latter's strong patriarchal nature: "Intellectually, the burden has shifted imperceptibly from discovering the truth to disseminating the truth." The bishops had become the church's elite with their own rationale for acting as "stewards of the truth." Russell points out that Augustine's views are limited to time and place and his own community, but later, others took what he said and applied it outside those parameters in ways Augustine never imagined or intended.

== Works ==
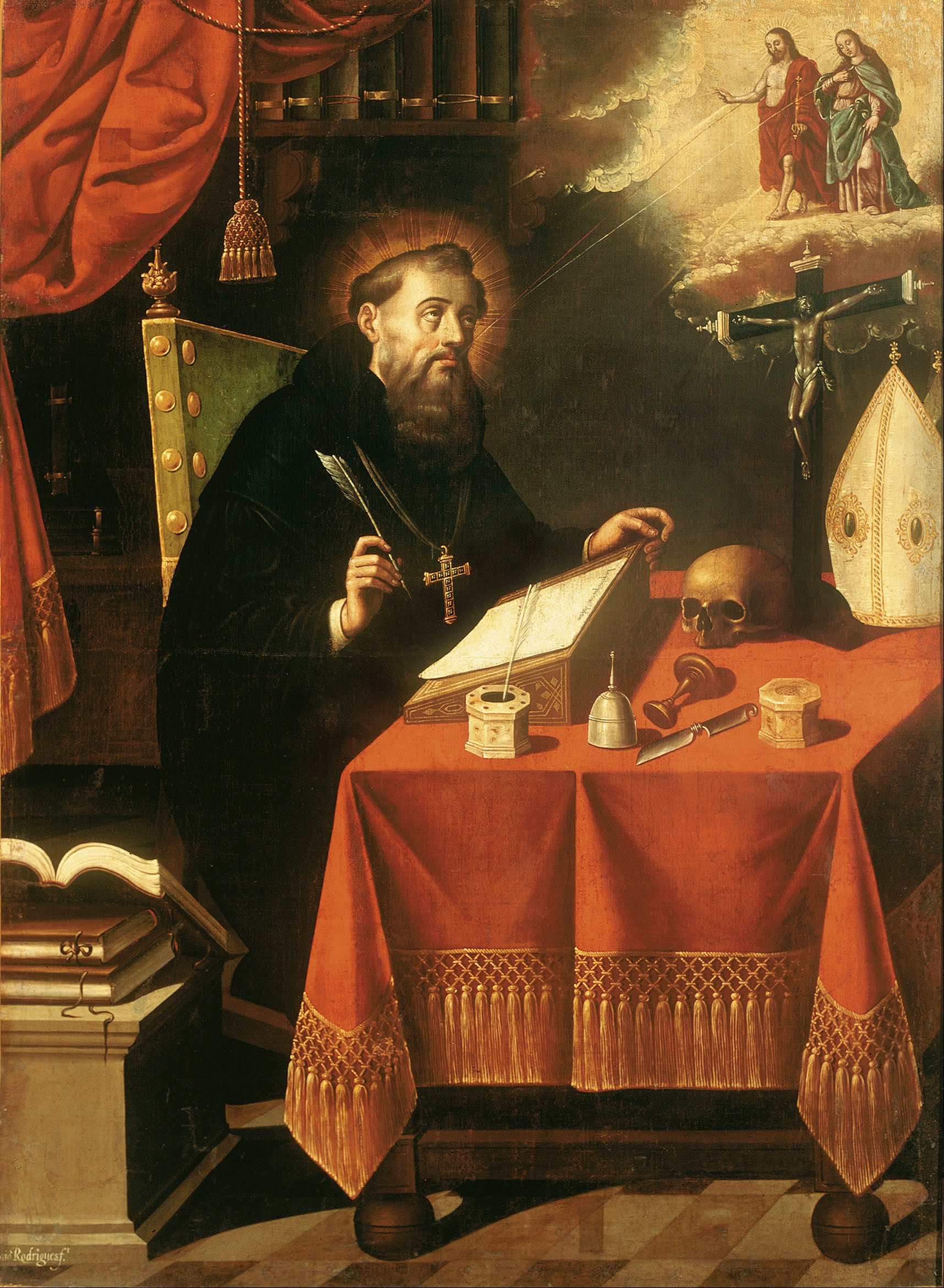
Saint Augustine, painting by Antonio Rodríguez

Augustine was one of the most prolific Latin authors in terms of surviving works, and the list of his works consists of more than one hundred separate titles. They include apologetic works against the heresies of the Arians, Donatists, Manichaeans and Pelagians; texts on Christian doctrine, notably De Doctrina Christiana (On Christian Doctrine); exegetical works such as commentaries on Genesis, the Psalms and Paul's Letter to the Romans; many sermons and letters; and the Retractationes, a review of his earlier works which he wrote near the end of his life.

Apart from those, Augustine is probably best known for his Confessions, which is a personal account of his earlier life, and for De civitate Dei (The City of God, consisting of 22 books), which he wrote to restore the confidence of his fellow Christians, which was badly shaken by the sack of Rome by the Visigoths in 410. His On the Trinity, in which he developed what has become known as the 'psychological analogy' of the Trinity, is also considered to be among his masterpieces, and arguably of more doctrinal importance than the Confessions or the City of God. He also wrote On Free Choice of the Will (De libero arbitrio), addressing why God gives humans free will that can be used for evil.

== Legacy ==
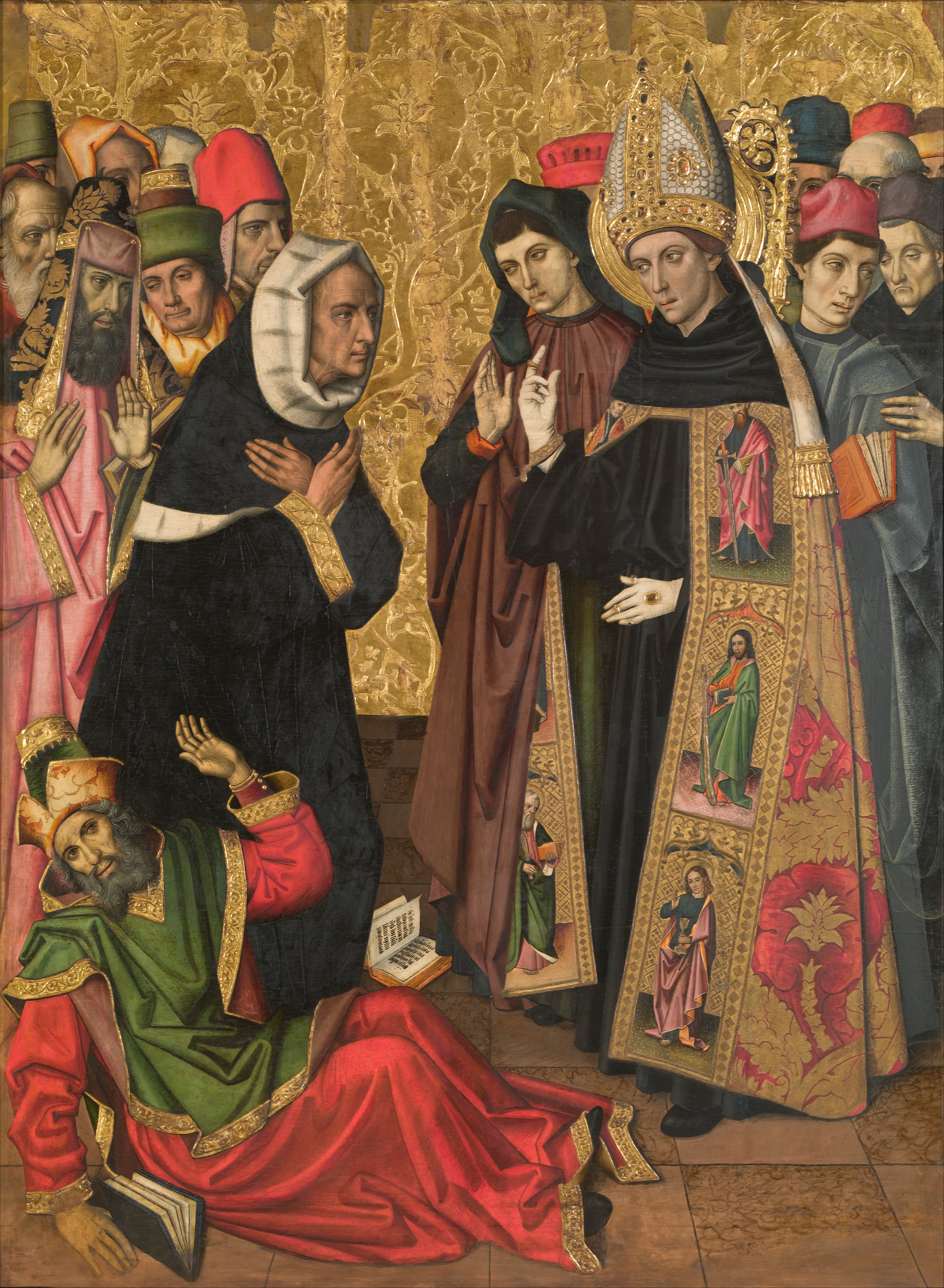
Saint Augustine Disputing with the Heretics, painting by Vergós Group

In both his philosophical and theological reasoning, Augustine was greatly influenced by Stoicism, Platonism and Neoplatonism, particularly by the work of Plotinus, author of the Enneads, probably through the mediation of Porphyry and Victorinus (as Pierre Hadot has argued). Some Neoplatonic concepts are still visible in Augustine's early writings. His early and influential writing on the human will, a central topic in ethics, would become a focus for later philosophers such as Schopenhauer, Kierkegaard, and Nietzsche. He was also influenced by the works of Virgil (known for his teaching on language), and Cicero (known for his teaching on argument). Augustine, along with Ambrose, Jerome and pope Gregory the Great, is considered one of the four Great Latin Church Fathers.

=== In philosophy ===
Philosopher Bertrand Russell was impressed by Augustine's meditation on the nature of time in the Confessions, comparing it favourably to Kant's version of the view that time is subjective. Catholic theologians generally subscribe to Augustine's belief that God exists outside of time in the "eternal present"; that time only exists within the created universe because only in space is time discernible through motion and change. His meditations on the nature of time are closely linked to his consideration of the human ability of memory. Frances Yates in her 1966 study The Art of Memory argues that a brief passage of the Confessions, 10.8.12, in which Augustine writes of walking up a flight of stairs and entering the vast fields of memory clearly indicates that the ancient Romans were aware of how to use explicit spatial and architectural metaphors as a mnemonic technique for organizing large amounts of information.

Augustine's philosophical method, especially demonstrated in his Confessions, had a continuing influence on Continental philosophy throughout the 20th century. His descriptive approach to intentionality, memory, and language as these phenomena are experienced within consciousness and time anticipated and inspired the insights of modern phenomenology and hermeneutics. Edmund Husserl writes: "The analysis of time-consciousness is an age-old crux of descriptive psychology and theory of knowledge. The first thinker to be deeply sensitive to the immense difficulties to be found here was Augustine, who laboured almost to despair over this problem."

Martin Heidegger refers to Augustine's descriptive philosophy at several junctures in his influential work Being and Time. (Note: For example, Martin Heidegger's articulations of how "Being-in-the-world" is described through thinking about seeing: "The remarkable priority of 'seeing' was noticed particularly by Augustine, in connection with his Interpretation of concupiscentia." Heidegger then quotes the Confessions: "Seeing belongs properly to the eyes. But we even use this word 'seeing' for the other senses when we devote them to cognizing... We not only say, 'See how that shines', ... 'but we even say, 'See how that sounds'". Being and Time, Trs. Macquarrie & Robinson. New York: Harpers, 1964, p. 171.) Hannah Arendt began her philosophical writing with a dissertation on Augustine's concept of love, Der Liebesbegriff bei Augustin (1929): "The young Arendt attempted to show that the philosophical basis for vita socialis in Augustine can be understood as residing in neighbourly love, grounded in his understanding of the common origin of humanity."

Jean Bethke Elshtain in Augustine and the Limits of Politics tried to associate Augustine with Arendt in their concept of evil: "Augustine did not see evil as glamorously demonic but rather as absence of good, something which paradoxically is really nothing. Arendt ... envisioned even the extreme evil which produced the Holocaust as merely banal [in Eichmann in Jerusalem]." Augustine's philosophical legacy continues to influence contemporary critical theory through the contributions and inheritors of these 20th-century figures. Seen from a historical perspective, there are three main perspectives on the political thought of Augustine: first, political Augustinianism; second, Augustinian political theology; and third, Augustinian political theory.

=== In theology ===
The historian Diarmaid MacCulloch has written: "Augustine's impact on Western Christian thought can hardly be overstated; only his beloved example, Paul of Tarsus, has been more influential, and Westerners have generally seen Paul through Augustine's eyes."

Thomas Aquinas was influenced heavily by Augustine. On the topic of original sin, Aquinas proposed a more optimistic view of man than that of Augustine in that his conception leaves to the reason, will, and passions of fallen man their natural powers even after the Fall, without "supernatural gifts". While in his pre-Pelagian writings Augustine taught that Adam's guilt as transmitted to his descendants much enfeebles, though does not destroy, the freedom of their will, Protestant reformers Martin Luther and John Calvin affirmed that Original Sin completely destroyed liberty (see total depravity).

According to Leo Ruickbie, Augustine's arguments against magic, differentiating it from a miracle, were crucial in the early Church's fight against paganism and became a central thesis in the later denunciation of witches and witchcraft. According to Professor Deepak Lal, Augustine's vision of the heavenly city has influenced the secular projects and traditions of the Enlightenment, Marxism, Freudianism and eco-fundamentalism. Post-Marxist philosophers Antonio Negri and Michael Hardt rely heavily on Augustine's thoughts, particularly The City of God, in their book of political philosophy Empire.

Augustine has influenced many modern-day theologians and authors such as John Piper. Hannah Arendt, an influential 20th-century political theorist, wrote her doctoral dissertation in philosophy on Augustine, and continued to rely on his thought throughout her career. Ludwig Wittgenstein extensively quotes Augustine in Philosophical Investigations for his approach to language, both admiringly, and as a sparring partner to develop his own ideas, including an extensive opening passage from the Confessions. Contemporary linguists have argued that Augustine has significantly influenced the thought of Ferdinand de Saussure, who did not 'invent' the modern discipline of semiotics, but rather built upon Aristotelian and Neoplatonic knowledge from the Middle Ages, via an Augustinian connection: "as for the constitution of Saussurian semiotic theory, the importance of the Augustinian thought contribution (correlated to the Stoic one) has also been recognized. Saussure did not do anything but reform an ancient theory in Europe, according to the modern conceptual exigencies."

Pope Benedict XVI, in his autobiographical book Milestones, notes that Augustine was one of the deepest influences in his thought. Pope Francis suggests that Augustine's reflections on the relationship between the "beloved disciple" and Jesus (John 13:23: "reclining next to him") contributed to the development of devotion to the Sacred Heart, and Pope Leo XIV, a member of the Augustinian order, refers to his patron as "a vigilant pastor and theologian of rare insight".

=== Oratorio, music ===
Marc-Antoine Charpentier, Motet "Pour St Augustin mourant", H.419, for 2 voices and continuo (1687), and "Pour St Augustin", H.307, for 2 voices and continuo (1670s).

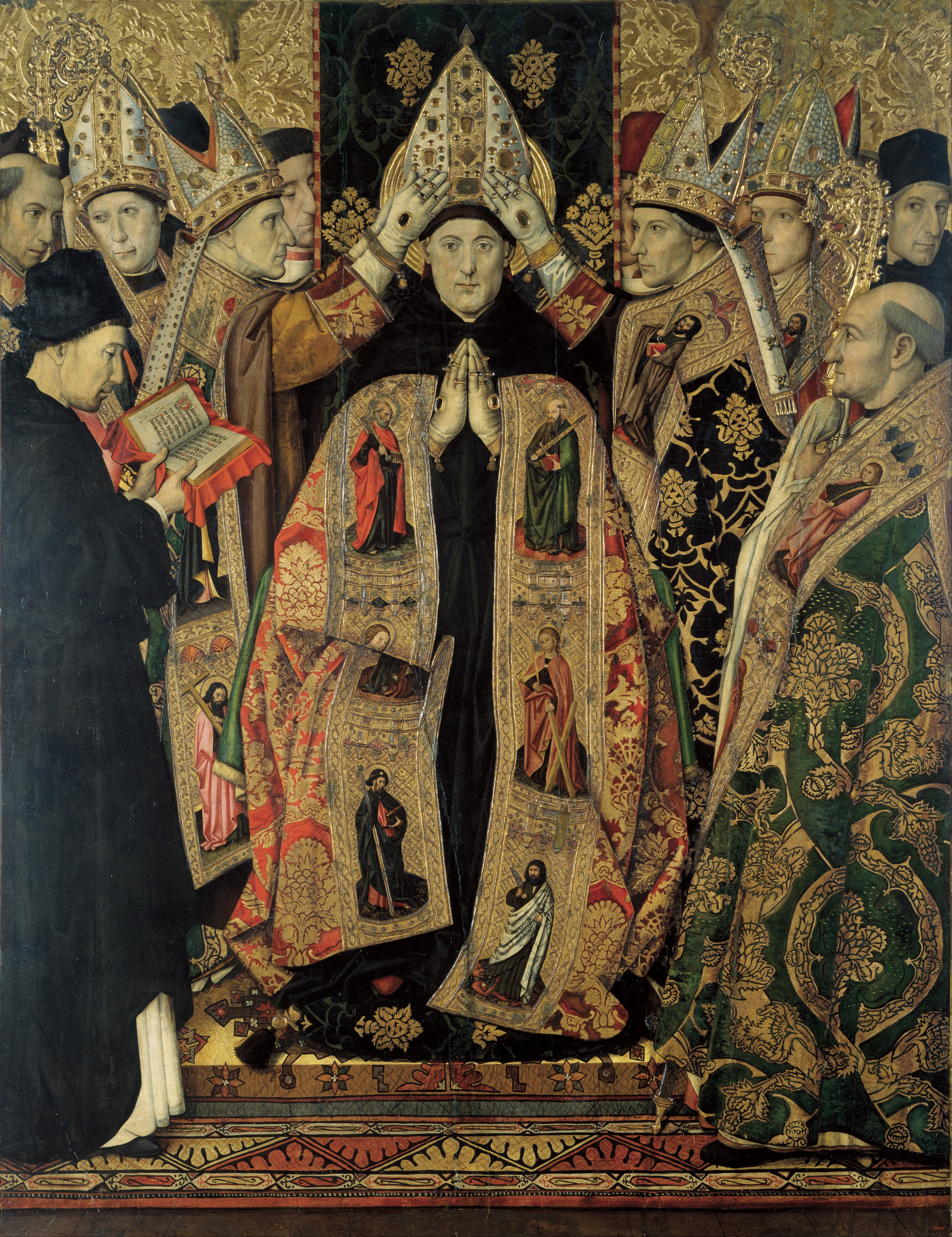
The Consecration of Saint Augustine by Jaume Huguet

Much of Augustine's conversion is dramatized in the oratorio La conversione di Sant'Agostino (1750) composed by Johann Adolph Hasse. The libretto for this oratorio, written by Duchess Maria Antonia of Bavaria, draws upon the influence of Metastasio (the finished libretto having been edited by him) and is based on an earlier five-act play Idea perfectae conversionis dive Augustinus written by the Jesuit priest Franz Neumayr. In the libretto Augustine's mother Monica is presented as a prominent character that is worried that Augustine might not convert to Christianity. As Dr. Andrea Palent says:

Maria Antonia Walpurgis revised the five-part Jesuit drama into a two-part oratorio liberty in which she limits the subject to the conversion of Augustine and his submission to the will of God. To this was added the figure of the mother, Monica, so as to let the transformation appear by experience rather than the dramatic artifice of deus ex machina.

=== In popular art ===
In his poem "Confessional", Frank Bidart compares the relationship between Augustine and his mother, Saint Monica, to the relationship between the poem's speaker and his mother.

In the 2010 TV miniseries Restless Heart: The Confessions of Saint Augustine, Augustine is played by Matteo Urzia (aged 15), Alessandro Preziosi (aged 25) and Franco Nero (aged 76).

In 1967, American singer-songwriter Bob Dylan released a song entitled "I Dreamed I Saw St. Augustine" as part of his album John Wesley Harding. The song has been covered by several artists including Joan Baez, Vic Chesnutt, Eric Clapton, John Doe, Thea Gilmore, Adam Selzer and Dirty Projectors.

In 2016, the band The Chairman Dances released "Augustine", a response song to Bob Dylan's "I Dreamed I Saw St. Augustine".

English pop/rock musician, singer and songwriter Sting wrote a song related to Saint Augustine entitled "Saint Augustine in Hell" which was part of his fourth solo studio album Ten Summoner's Tales released in 1993.

== See also ==
- Augustinus-Lexikon
- Cogito, ergo sum
- Rule of Saint Augustine
- Pseudo-Augustine

== Bibliography ==
- A'Becket, John (1907). "Adeodatus" . In Herbermann, Charles (ed.). Catholic Encyclopedia. Vol. 1. New York: Robert Appleton Company.
- Ambrose (1919). James Herbert Strawley (ed.). St. Ambrose. on the Mysteries and the Treatise, on the Sacraments, by an Unknown Author – Scholar's Choice Edition. Translated by Tom Thompson. Society for Promoting Christian Knowledge.
- Austin, Michael W. (2006). "Divine Command Theory". Internet Encyclopedia of Philosophy.
- Bauerschmidt, John C (1999). "Abortion". In Fitzgerald, Allan D (ed.). Augustine Through the Ages: An Encyclopedia. Wm B Eerdmans. ISBN 978-0-8028-3843-8.
- BeDuhn, Jason (2010). Conversion and Apostasy, 373–388 C.E. Augustine's Manichaean Dilemma. University of Pennsylvania Press. ISBN 978-0-8122-4210-2.
- Blomberg, Craig L. (2006). From Pentecost to Patmos: An Introduction to Acts Through Revelation. B&H. ISBN 978-0-8054-3248-0.
- Bonner, G (1986). St. Augustine of Hippo. Life and Controversies. Norwich: The Canterbury Press. ISBN 978-0-86078-203-2.
- Bonner, Gerald (1987). "Rufinus of Syria and African Pelagianism". God's Decree and Man's Destiny. London: Variorum Reprints. pp. 31–47. ISBN 978-0-86078-203-2.
- Brachtendorf, J. (1997). "Cicero and Augustine on the Passions". REAug (2). hdl:2042/23075. Archived from the original on 5 July 2017.
- Burke, Cormac (2006). "A Postscript to the "Remedium Concupiscentiae"". The Thomist: A Speculative Quarterly Review. 70 (4): 481–536. doi:10.1353/tho.2006.0000. ISSN 2473-3725. S2CID 171345213.
- Brett, Michael; Fentress, Elizabeth W.B. (1996). The Berbers. Blackwell. ISBN 978-0-631-16852-2.
- Brown, Peter (2000). Augustine of Hippo: A Biography. Berkeley: University of California Press. ISBN 978-0-520-22757-6.
- Burrus, Virginia (2011). "'Fleeing the Uxorious Kingdom': Augustine's Queer Theology of Marriage". Journal of Early Christian Studies. 19 (1): 1–20. doi:10.1353/earl.2011.0002. S2CID 144407492.
- Carroll, James (2002). Constantine's Sword: The Church and the Jews. Houghton Mifflin Harcourt. ISBN 0-618-21908-0.
- Chadwick, Henry (2001). Augustine: A Very Short Introduction. Oxford: University Press. ISBN 978-0-19-160663-2.
- Chadwick, Henry (2010). Augustine of Hippo: A Life. Oxford: University Press. ISBN 978-0-19-161533-7.
- Chiba, Shin (1995). "Hannah Arendt on Love and the Political: Love, Friendship, and Citizenship". The Review of Politics. 57 (3): 505–535. doi:10.1017/S0034670500019720. JSTOR 1408599. S2CID 146790136.
- Clark, Elizabeth A. (1986). "'Adam's Only Companion': Augustine and the Early Christian Debate on Marriage". Recherches Augustiniennes et Patristiques. 21: 139–162. doi:10.1484/J.RA.5.102318. ISSN 0484-0887.
- Clark, Elizabeth, ed. (1996). St. Augustine on Marriage and Sexuality. CUA Press. ISBN 978-0-8132-0867-1.
- Clarke, T.E. (1958). "St. Augustine and Cosmic Redemption". Theological Studies. 19 (2): 151. doi:10.1177/004056395801900201. S2CID 170987704.
- Cross, Frank Leslie; Livingstone, Elizabeth A. (2005). The Oxford Dictionary of the Christian Church. Oxford: University Press. ISBN 978-0-19-280290-3.
- Dale, Sharon (2001). "A house divided: San Pietro in Ciel d'Oro in Pavia and the politics of Pope John XXII". Journal of Medieval History. 27 (1): 55–77. doi:10.1016/S0304-4181(00)00016-6. ISSN 0304-4181. S2CID 153446043.
- De Paulo, Craig J. N. (2006). The Influence of Augustine on Heidegger: The Emergence of an Augustinian Phenomenology. Lewiston, New York: Edwin Mellen Press. ISBN 978-0-7734-5689-1.
- Demacopoulos, George E.; Papanikolaou, Aristotle, eds. (2008). Orthodox Readings of Augustine. Crestwood, NY: St. Vladimirs Seminary Press. ISBN 978-0-88141-327-4.
- Dihle, Albrecht (1982). The Theory of Will in Classical Antiquity. University of California Press. ISBN 978-0-520-04059-5.
- Doniger, Wendy, ed. (1999). "Manichaeanism". Merriam-Webster's Encyclopedia of World Religions. Merriam-Webster. ISBN 978-0-87779-044-0.
- Durant, Will (1992). Caesar and Christ: A History of Roman Civilization and of Christianity from Their Beginnings to A.D. 325. MJF Books. ISBN 978-1-56731-014-6.
- Garroway, Joshua (2021). "The Jewish Diaspora in Christian Thinking". In Diner, Hasia R. (ed.). The Oxford handbook of the Jewish diaspora. New York, NY: Oxford University Press. pp. 99–116. ISBN 9780197554807.
- Esmeralda, Alberto (n.d.). "Augustinian Values" (PDF). Archived from the original (PDF) on 28 September 2007.
- Ferguson, Everett (1999). Christianity in Relation to Jews, Greeks, and Romans. Taylor & Francis. ISBN 978-0-8153-3069-1.
- Flinn, Frank K. (2007). Encyclopedia of Catholicism. Infobase Publishing. ISBN 978-0-8160-7565-2.
- Franklin-Brown, Mary (2012). Reading the World: Encyclopedic Writing in the Scholastic Age. University of Chicago Press. ISBN 978-0-226-26070-9.
- Gerson, Lloyd P. (1999). Plotinus : Arguments of the philosophers. Taylor & Francis. ISBN 978-0-415-20352-4.
- González, Justo L. (1987). From Augustine to the Eve of the Reformation. A History of Christian Thought. Abingdon Press. ISBN 978-0-687-17183-5.
- Gonzalez, Justo L. (2010). Volume 1: The Early Church to the Dawn of the Reformation. The Story of Christianity. HarperCollins. ISBN 978-0-06-185588-7.
- Greenblatt, Stephen (19 June 2017). "How St. Augustine Invented Sex". The New Yorker.
- Hägglund, Bengt (2007) [1968]. Teologins historia [History of Theology] (in German). Translated by Gene J. Lund (4th revised ed.). St. Louis, Missouri: Concordia Publishing House. ISBN 978-0-7586-1348-6.
- Hill, Edmund (1961). "St Augustine on the Trinity – I". Life of the Spirit. 15 (180): 540–548. doi:10.1017/S0269359300011873. JSTOR 43705747.
- Hollingworth, Miles (2013). Saint Augustine of Hippo: An Intellectual Biography. Oxford University Press. ISBN 978-0-19-986159-0.
- Howie, George (1969). Educational theory and practice in St. Augustine. London: Routledge and Kegan Paul.
- Huffington, Arianna (3 September 2013). "Solution to many a problem: Take a walk". www.baltimoresun.com.
- Husserl, Edmund (2019). The Phenomenology of Internal Time-Consciousness. Indiana University Press. ISBN 978-0-253-04199-9.
- James, Frank A. (1998). Peter Martyr Vermigli and Predestination: The Augustinian Inheritance of an Italian Reformer. Oxford: Clarendon Press. ISBN 978-0-19-826969-4.
- Jayapalan, N. (2001). Comprehensive History of Political Thought. Atlantic Publishers & Dist. ISBN 978-81-269-0073-2.
- Jenson, Matt (2006). The Gravity of Sin: Augustine, Luther and Barth on 'homo Incurvatus in Se'. Bloomsbury Academic. ISBN 978-0-567-03137-2.
- Jones, Barry (2017). Dictionary of World Biography (4th ed.). ANU Press. ISBN 978-1-76046-126-3.
- Jurgens, William (1970). The Faith of the Early Fathers. Vol. 3. Collegeville, MN: Liturgical Press. ISBN 978-0-8146-1021-3.
- King, Peter; Ballantyne, Nathan (2009). "Augustine on Testimony" (PDF). Canadian Journal of Philosophy. 39 (2): 195. doi:10.1353/cjp.0.0045. S2CID 660491. Archived from the original (PDF) on 4 December 2014.
- Kishlansky, Mark A.; Geary, Patrick J.; O'Brien, Patricia (2005). To 1715. Civilization in the West. Pearson Longman. ISBN 978-0-321-23621-0. OL 27691066M.
- Knowles, Andrew; Penkett, Pachomios (2004). Augustine and His World. InterVarsity Press. ISBN 978-0-8308-2356-7.
- Lal, Deepak (1 March 2002). "Morality and Capitalism: Learning from the Past". No 812, UCLA Economics Working Papers from UCLA Department of Economics.
- Lancel, Serge (2002). Saint Augustine. SCM Press. ISBN 978-0-334-02866-6.
- Leith, John H. (1990). From Generation to Generation: The Renewal of the Church According to Its Own Theology and Practice. Westminster John Knox Press. ISBN 978-0-664-25122-2.
- Levering, Matthew (2011). Predestination: Biblical and Theological Paths. New York: Oxford University Press. ISBN 978-0-19-960452-4.
- Luker, Kristin (1985). Abortion and the Politics of Motherhood. University of California Press. ISBN 978-0-520-90792-8.
- Lysaught, M. Therese; Kotva, Joseph; Lammers, Stephen E.; Verhey, Allen (2012). On Moral Medicine: Theological Perspectives on Medical Ethics. Wm. B. Eerdmans. ISBN 978-0-8028-6601-1.
- MacCulloch, Diarmaid M (2010). A History of Christianity: The First Three Thousand Years. Penguin Books. ISBN 978-0-14-102189-8.
- Magill, Frank N. (2003). The Ancient World: Dictionary of World Biography. Routledge. ISBN 978-1-135-45740-2.
- Mann, WE (1999). "Inner-Life Ethics". In Gareth B. Matthews (ed.). The Augustinian Tradition. University of California Press. ISBN 978-0-520-20999-2.
- Matthews, Gareth B. (1992). Thought's Ego in Augustine and Descartes. Cornell University Press. ISBN 0-8014-2775-4.
- McCloskey, Gary N. (April 2008). "Encounters of Learning: Saint Augustine on Education" (PDF). Saint Augustine Institute for Learning and Teaching, Merrimack College. Archived from the original (PDF) on 16 October 2022.
- McIntire, C.T. (2005). "Free Will and Predestination: Christian Concepts". In Jones, Lindsay (ed.). The Encyclopedia of Religion. Vol. 5 (2nd ed.). Farmington Hills, MI: Macmillan Reference.
- Meister, Chad V.; Copan, Paul (2013). The Routledge Companion to Philosophy of Religion (2nd ed.). Routledge. ISBN 978-0-415-78294-4.
- Munteanu, E. (1996). "On the Object-Language / Metalanguage Distinction in Saint Augustine's Works. De Dialectica and de Magistro". In Cram, D.; Linn, A.R.; Nowak, E. (eds.). Volume 2: From Classical to Contemporary Linguistics. History of Linguistics. John Benjamins. ISBN 978-9027283818.
- Nguyen, vanThanh; Prior, John M. (2014). God's People on the Move: Biblical and Global Perspectives on Migration and Mission. Wipf and Stock Publishers. ISBN 978-1-63087-751-4. "Paul Orosius was a fifth century CE historian and theologian and a student of St. Augustine of Hippo"
- O'Donnell, James Joseph (2005). Augustine: A New Biography. HarperCollins. ISBN 978-0-06-053537-7.
- Oakes, Jonathan (2008). Algeria. Bradt Travel Guides. ISBN 978-1-84162-232-3.
- Park, Jae-Eun (August 2013). "Lacking love or conveying love?: The fundamental roots of the Donatists and Augustine's nuanced treatment of them". The Reformed Theological Review. 72 (2): 103–121.
- Oestreich, Thomas (1907). "Pope Boniface VIII" . In Herbermann, Charles (ed.). Catholic Encyclopedia. Vol. 2. New York: Robert Appleton Company.
- Pope, Hugh (1911). "St. Monica" . In Herbermann, Charles (ed.). Catholic Encyclopedia. Vol. 10. New York: Robert Appleton Company.
- Portalié, Eugène (1907a). "Life of St. Augustine of Hippo" . In Herbermann, Charles (ed.). Catholic Encyclopedia. Vol. 2. New York: Robert Appleton Company.
- Portalié, Eugène (1907b). "Teaching of St. Augustine of Hippo" . In Herbermann, Charles (ed.). Catholic Encyclopedia. Vol. 2. New York: Robert Appleton Company.
- Possidius (2008). The Life of Saint Augustine. Translated by Herbert T. Weiskotten. Arx. ISBN 978-1-889758-90-9.
- Power, Kim (1999). "Family, Relatives". In Allan D. Fitzgerald (ed.). Augustine Through the Ages: An Encyclopedia. Grand Rapids: Wm. B. Eerdmans. ISBN 978-0-8028-3843-8.
- Quintilian (1939). Institutio Oratoria. Translated by H.E. Butler. London: W. Heinemann.
- Ranke-Heinemann, Uta (1990). Eunuchs for the kingdom of heaven: women, sexuality and the Catholic Church. Doubleday. ISBN 978-0-385-26527-0.
- Riggs, John (2015). The Lord's Supper in the Reformed Tradition. Louisville, Kentucky: Westminster John Knox. ISBN 978-0-664-26019-4.
- Russell, Bertrand (1945). A History of Western Philosophy. Simon & Schuster.
- Ryan, M.J (1908). "Character (in Catholic Theology)" . In Herbermann, Charles (ed.). Catholic Encyclopedia. Vol. 3. New York: Robert Appleton Company.
- Salway, Benet (1994). "What's in a Name? A Survey of Roman Onomastic Practice from c. 700 B.C. to A.D. 700". Journal of Roman Studies. 84: 124–145. doi:10.2307/300873. ISSN 0075-4358. JSTOR 300873. S2CID 162435434.
- Schaff, Philip, ed. (1887). Volume II: St Augustine's City of God and Christian Doctrine. A Select library of the Nicene and post-Nicene fathers of the Christian church. Buffalo: The Christian Literature Company.
- Sfameni Gasparro, Giulia (2001). Enkrateia e Antropologia. Le motivazioni protologiche della continenza e della verginità nel christianesimo del primi secoli e nello gnosticismo. Studia Ephemeridis (in Italian). Rome: Institutum Patristicum "Augustinianum".
- Schnaubelt, Joseph C.; Van Fleteren, Frederick (1999). Augustine in Iconography: History and Legend. P. Lang. ISBN 978-0-8204-2291-6.
- Siecienski, A. Edward (2010). The Filioque: History of a Doctrinal Controversy. OUP USA. ISBN 978-0-19-537204-5.
- Smither, Howard E. (1977). A History of the Oratorio. UNC Press Books. ISBN 978-0-8078-1274-7.
- Somers, H. (1961). "S.J. : Image de Dieu. Les sources de l'exégèse augustinienne". Revue d'Études Augustiniennes et Patristiques. 7 (2): 105–125. doi:10.1484/J.REA.5.104017. ISSN 1768-9260.
- Southern, R.W. (1978) [1953]. The Making of the Middle Ages. London: New Haven, Yale University Press. ISBN 978-0-3000-0230-0.
- Stone, Harold Samuel (2002). St. Augustine's Bones: A Microhistory. University of Massachusetts Press. ISBN 978-1-55849-387-2.
- Stroumsa, Gediliahu (1992). "Titus of Bostra and Alexander of Lycopolis: A Christian and a Platonic Refutation of Manichaean Dualism". In Richard T. Wallis; Jay Bregman (eds.). Neoplatonism and Gnosticism. SUNY Press. ISBN 978-1-4384-2313-5.
- TeSelle, Eugene (2002). Augustine the Theologian. Wipf and Stock. ISBN 978-1-57910-918-9.
- Testard, M (1958). Saint Augustin et Cicéron, I. Cicéron dans la formation et l'oeuvre de saint Augustin (in French). Paris: Études Augustiniennes.
- Teske, Roland J. (1999). "Genesi ad litteram liber imperfectus, De". In Fitzgerald, Allan D. (ed.). Augustine through the Ages: An Encyclopedia. Wm B Eerdmans. ISBN 978-0-8028-3843-8.
- Tinder, Glenn (1997). "Review of Augustine and the Limits of Politics, by Jean Bethke Elshtain". American Political Science Review. 91 (2): 432–433. doi:10.2307/2952372. JSTOR 2952372. S2CID 151790345.
- Trapè, Agostino (1987). S. Agostino, introduzione alla dottrina della grazia [St. Augustine, introduction to the doctrine of grace] (in Italian). Vol. 1. Città Nuova. ISBN 978-88-311-3402-6.
- Van Biema, David (7 December 2008). "Paula Fredriksen Was Saint Augustine Good for the Jews?". Time magazine.
- Van Der Meer, F (1961). Augustine the Bishop. The Life and Work of the Father of the Church. London & New York.
- van Oort, Johannes (2010). "Manichaean Christians in Augustine's Life and Work". History and Religious Culture. 90.
- Wells, J. (2000). Longman Pronunciation Dictionary (2nd ed.). New York: Longman. ISBN 978-0-582-36467-7.
- Widengren, Geo (1977). Der Manichäismus. Darmstadt: Wissenschaftliche Buchgesellschaft.
- Wilhelm, Joseph (1910). "Heroic virtue" . In Herbermann, Charles (ed.). Catholic Encyclopedia. Vol. 7. New York: Robert Appleton Company.
- Wilken, Robert L. (2003). The Spirit of Early Christian Thought. New Haven: Yale University Press. ISBN 978-0-300-10598-8.
- Wilson, Kenneth M. (2018). Augustine's Conversion from Traditional Free Choice to "Non-free Free Will": A Comprehensive Methodology. Tübingen: Mohr Siebeck. ISBN 978-3-16-155753-8.
- Wilson, Ken (2019). The Foundation of Augustinian-Calvinism. Independently Published. ISBN 978-1-08-280035-1.
- Woo, B. Hoon (2015). "Pilgrim's Progress in Society – Augustine's Political Thought in The City of God". Political Theology. 16 (5): 421–441. doi:10.1179/1462317X14Z.000000000113. S2CID 218691369.
- Wright, Frederick Adam; Sinclair, Thomas Alan (1931). A History of Later Latin Literature. Routledge.

=== Further reading ===
- Ancient Christian Writers: The Works of the Fathers in Translation. New York: Newman Press. 1978.
- Augustine, Saint (1974). Vernon Joseph Bourke (ed.). The Essential Augustine (2nd ed.). Indianapolis: Hackett.
- Ayres, Lewis (2010). Augustine and the Trinity. Cambridge: Cambridge University Press. ISBN 978-0-521-83886-3.
- Beierwaltes, Werner (1980). Regio Beatitudinis: Augustine's Concept of Happiness (PDF). Villanova University Institute for the Study of Augustine and Augustinian Tradition. Archived from the original (PDF) on 13 November 2024.
- Bourke, Vernon Joseph (1945). Augustine's Quest of Wisdom. Milwaukee: Bruce.
- Bourke, Vernon Joseph (1984). Wisdom From St. Augustine. Houston: Center for Thomistic Studies.
- Burke, Cormac (1990). "St. Augustine and Conjugal Sexuality". Communio. IV (17): 545–565. Archived from the original on 13 August 2021.
- Burnaby, John (1989) [1938]. Amor Dei: A Study of the Religion of St. Augustine. The Canterbury Press Norwich. ISBN 978-1-85311-022-1.
- Conybeare, Catherine (2006). The Irrational Augustine. Oxford University Press. ISBN 978-0-19-926208-3.
- Clark, Mary T. (1994). Augustine. Geoffrey Chapman. ISBN 978-0-225-66681-6.
- Deane, Herbert A. (1963). The Political and Social Ideas of St. Augustine. New York: Columbia University Press.
- de Paulo, Craig J.N. (2011). Augustinian Just War Theory and the Wars in Afghanistan and Iraq: Confessions, Contentions and the Lust for Power. Peter Lang. ISBN 978-1-4331-1232-4.
- Dodaro, Robert (2004). Christ and the Just Society in the Thought of Augustine. Cambridge University Press. ISBN 9780521069649.
- Doull, James A. (1979). "Augustinian Trinitarianism and Existential Theology". Dionysius. III: 111–159.
- Doull, James A. (1988). "What is Augustinian 'Sapientia' of?". Dionysius. XII: 61–67.
- Fairweather, E.R. (1954). "St. Augustine's Interpretation of Infant Baptism". Augustinus Magister: Congrès International Augustinien, 1954. Études Augustiniennes. pp. 897–903. ASIN B000R97CFU.
- Fox, Robin Lane (2015). Augustine: Conversions to Confessions. New York: Basic Books.
- Gilson, Etienne (1960). The Christian Philosophy of St. Augustine. L.E.M. Lynch, trans. New York: Random House.
- Green, Bradley G. Colin Gunton and the Failure of Augustine: The Theology of Colin Gunton in the Light of Augustine, James Clarke and Co. (2012), ISBN 978-0227680056
- Hunter, David G.; Yates, Jonathan P., eds. (2021). Augustine and Tradition: Influences, Contexts, Legacy. Grand Rapids, MI: Eerdmans. ISBN 978-0-8028-7699-7.
- Kolbet, Paul R. (2010). Augustine and the Cure of Souls: Revising a Classical Ideal. Notre Dame, Indiana: University of Notre Dame Press. ISBN 978-0-268-03321-7.
- Lawless, George P. (1987). Augustine of Hippo and His Monastic Rule. Oxford: Clarendon Press.
- LeMoine, Fannie; Kleinhenz, Christopher, eds. (1994). Saint Augustine the Bishop: A Book of Essays. Garland Medieval Casebooks. Vol. 9. New York: Garland.
- Lubin, Augustino (1659). Orbis Augustinianus sive conventuum ordinis eremitarum Sancti Augustini – chorographica et topographica descriptio. Paris. Archived from the original on 23 March 2010.
- Mackey, Louis (2011). Faith Order Understanding: Natural Theology in the Augustinian Tradition. Totonto: PIMS. ISBN 978-0-88844-421-9.
- Markus, R.A., ed. (1972). Augustine: A Collection of Critical Essays. Garden City, NY: Anchor.
- Matthews, Gareth B. (2005). Augustine. Blackwell. ISBN 978-0-631-23348-0.
- Mayer, Cornelius P. (ed.). Augustinus-Lexikon. Basel: Schwabe AG.
- Miles, Margaret R. (2012). Augustine and the Fundamentalist's Daughter, Lutterworth Press, ISBN 978-0718892623.
- Nash, Ronald H (1969). The Light of the Mind: St Augustine's Theory of Knowledge. Lexington: University Press of Kentucky.
- Nelson, John Charles (1973). "Platonism in the Renaissance". In Wiener, Philip (ed.). Dictionary of the History of Ideas. Vol. 3. New York: Scribner. pp. 510–515 (vol. 3). ISBN 978-0-684-13293-8. "(...) Saint Augustine asserted that Neo-Platonism possessed all spiritual truths except that of the Incarnation. (...)"
- O'Daly, Gerard (1987). Augustine's Philosophy of the Mind. Berkeley: University of California Press.
- O'Donnell, James (2005). Augustine: A New Biography. New York: ECCO. ISBN 978-0-06-053537-7.
- Pagels, Elaine (1989). Adam, Eve, and the Serpent: Sex and Politics in Early Christianity. Vintage Books. ISBN 978-0-679-72232-8.
- Park, Jae-Eun (2013). "Lacking Love or Conveying Love? The Fundamental Roots of the Donatists and Augustine's Nuanced Treatment of Them". The Reformed Theological Review. 72 (2): 103–121..
- Plumer, Eric Antone (2003). Augustine's Commentary on Galatians. Oxford University Press. ISBN 978-0-19-924439-3.
- Pollman, Karla (2007). Saint Augustine the Algerian. Göttingen: Edition Ruprecht. ISBN 978-3-89744-209-2.
- Pottier, René (2006). Saint Augustin le Berbère (in French). Fernand Lanore. ISBN 978-2-85157-282-0.
- Starnes, Colin (1990). Augustine's Conversion: A Guide to the Arguments of Confessions I–IX. Waterloo, Ontario: Wilfrid Laurier University Press.
- Tanquerey, Adolphe (2001). The Spiritual Life: A Treatise on Ascetical and Mystical Theology. Rockford, Illinois: Tan Books & Publishers. p. 37. ISBN 978-0-89555-659-2.
- Trapè, A. (1990). "S. Agostino: Introduzione alla Dottrina della Grazia". I – Natura e Grazia. Collana di Studi Agostiniani 4. Rome: Città Nuova. p. 422. ISBN 978-88-311-3402-6.
- von Heyking, John (2001). Augustine and Politics as Longing in the World. Columbia: University of Missouri Press. ISBN 978-0-8262-1349-5.
- Watson, Gerard (1982). "St. Augustine's Theory of Language". The Maynooth Review / Revieú Mhá Nuad. 6 (2). Maynooth: Faculty of Arts, Celtic Studies & Philosophy NUIM: 4–20. ISSN 0332-4869. JSTOR 20556950.
- Watson, Gerard (1985). ""I Doubt, Therefore I Am": St. Augustine and Scepticism". The Maynooth Review / Revieú Mhá Nuad. 12. Maynooth: Faculty of Arts, Celtic Studies & Philosophy NUIM: 42–50. ISSN 0332-4869. JSTOR 20556991.
- Woo, B. Hoon (2013). "Augustine's Hermeneutics and Homiletics in De doctrina christiana". Journal of Christian Philosophy. 17: 97–117.
- Zumkeller O.S.A., Adolar (1986). Augustine's Ideal of the Religious Life. New York: Fordham University Press. ISBN 978-0-8232-1105-0.
- Zumkeller O.S.A., Adolar (1987). Augustine's Rule. Villanova: Augustinian Press. ISBN 978-0-941491-06-8.
