= The Ten Commandments (1956 film) =

1956 film by Cecil B. DeMille

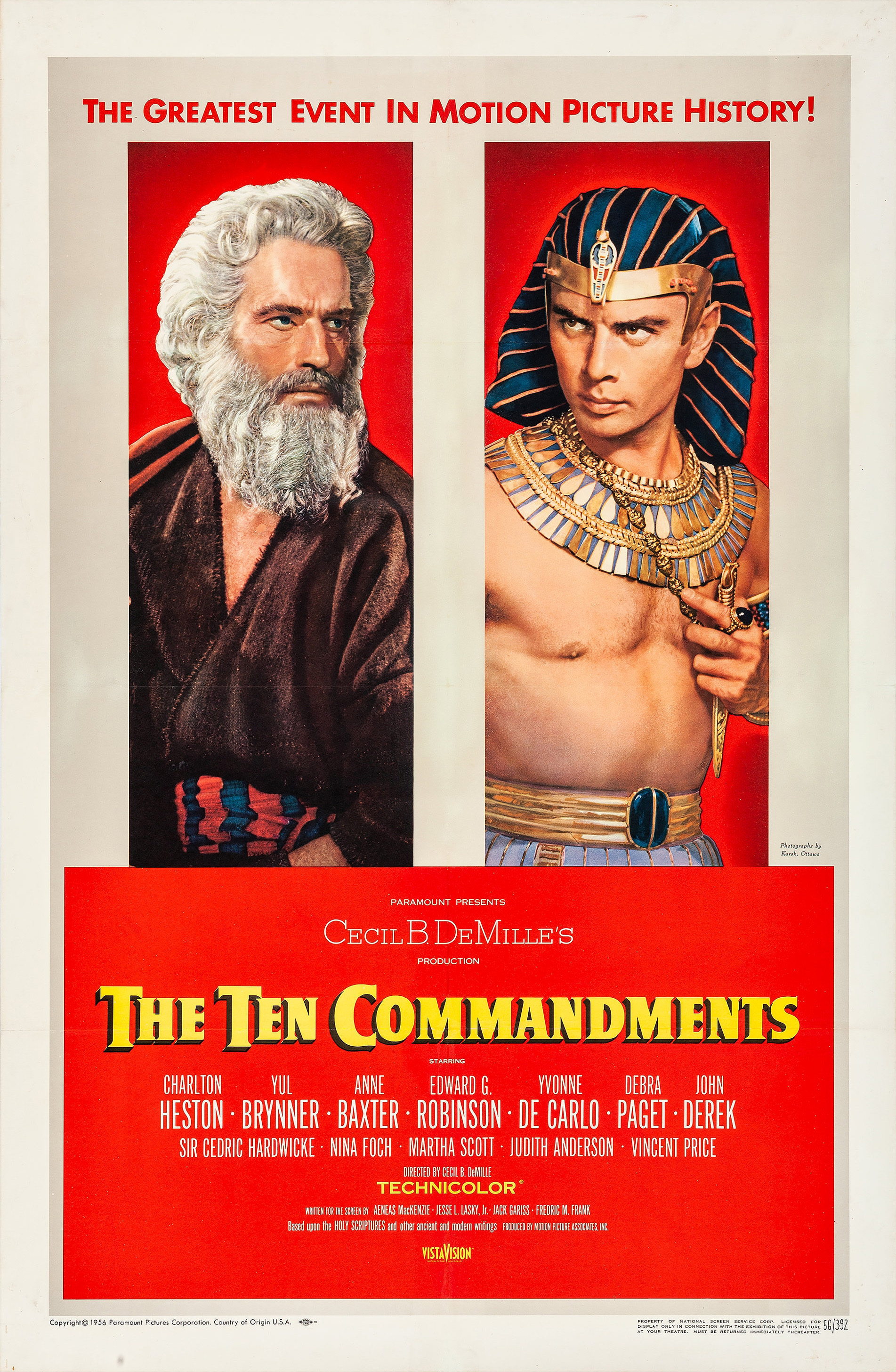
- Theatrical release poster by Macario Gómez Quibus
- Directed by: Cecil B. DeMille
- Screenplay by: Æneas MacKenzie; Jesse L. Lasky, Jr. Jack Gariss; Fredric M. Frank
- Based on: Book of Exodus; Prince of Egypt (1949 novel) by Dorothy Clarke Wilson; Pillar of Fire (1859 novel) by J. H. Ingraham; On Eagle's Wings (1939 novel) by A. E. Southon
- Produced by: Cecil B. DeMille
- Starring: Charlton Heston; Yul Brynner; Anne Baxter; Edward G. Robinson; Yvonne De Carlo; Debra Paget; John Derek; Cedric Hardwicke; Nina Foch; Martha Scott; Judith Anderson; Vincent Price
- Cinematography: Loyal Griggs
- Edited by: Anne Bauchens
- Music by: Elmer Bernstein
- Production company: Motion Picture Associates
- Distributed by: Paramount Pictures
- Release dates: November 8, 1956 (New York City); November 14, 1956 (Beverly Hills)
- Running time: 220 minutes (without overture, intermission, entr'acte, and exit music)
- Country: United States
- Language: English
- Budget: $13 million
- Box office: $122.7 million (initial release)

The Ten Commandments is a 1956 American biblical epic film produced, directed, and narrated by Cecil B. DeMille, shot in VistaVision (color by Technicolor), and released by Paramount Pictures. Based on the Bible's Book of Exodus and other sources, (Note: According to the film's on-screen credits, the screenplay "was compiled from many sources and contains material from the books": Prince of Egypt (1949) by Dorothy Clarke Wilson, Pillar of Fire <rev> (1859) by J. H. Ingraham, and On Eagle's Wings (1939) by A. E. Southon. The credits also mention the writings of Philo, Josephus, Eusebius, and the Midrash.) it dramatizes the story of the life of Moses, an adopted Egyptian prince who becomes the deliverer of his real brethren, the enslaved Hebrews, and thereafter leads the Exodus to Mount Sinai, where he receives the titular commandments from God. The film stars Charlton Heston in the lead role, Yul Brynner as Rameses, (Note: Spelling differences exist between how some of the characters are credited and the actual biblical/historical person the character is based upon. DeMille took some of the subplots and characters from Dorothy Clarke Wilson's best-selling novel Prince of Egypt (1949); he retained Wilson's spelling of "Nefretiri" (based on the historical/biblical Nefertari), but the names of the pharaoh "Seti" (Seti I) and his son "Ramses" (Ramesses II) are changed to Sethi and Rameses respectively.) Anne Baxter as Nefretiri, Edward G. Robinson as Dathan, Yvonne De Carlo as Sephora, Debra Paget as Lilia, and John Derek as Joshua; and features Sir Cedric Hardwicke as Sethi I, Nina Foch as Bithiah, Martha Scott as Yochabel, Judith Anderson as Memnet, and Vincent Price as Baka, among others.

First announced in 1952, The Ten Commandments is a remake of the prologue of DeMille's 1923 silent film of the same title. Four screenwriters, three art directors, and five costume designers worked on the film. In 1954, it was filmed on location in Egypt, Mount Sinai, and the Sinai Peninsula, featuring one of the largest exterior sets ever created for a motion picture. In 1955, the interior sets were constructed on Paramount's Hollywood soundstages. The original roadshow version included an onscreen introduction by DeMille and was released to cinemas in the United States on November 8, 1956, and, at the time of its release, was the most expensive film ever made. It was DeMille's most successful work, his first widescreen film, his fourth biblical production, and his final directorial effort before his death in 1959.

In 1957, the film was nominated for seven Academy Awards, including Best Picture, winning the Academy Award for Best Visual Effects (John P. Fulton, A.S.C.). DeMille won the Foreign Language Press Film Critics Circle Award for Best Director. Charlton Heston was nominated for a Golden Globe Award for Best Performance by an Actor in a Motion Picture (Drama). Yul Brynner won the National Board of Review Award for Best Actor. (Note: Brynner's portrayal of Rameses was jointly awarded with his performances in Anastasia and The King and I (all released in 1956).) Heston, Anne Baxter, and Yvonne De Carlo won Laurel Awards for Best Dramatic Actor, 5th Best Dramatic Actress, and 3rd Best Supporting Actress, respectively. It is also one of the most financially successful films ever made, grossing approximately $122.7 million at the box office during its initial release; it was the most successful film of 1956 and the second-highest-grossing film of the decade. According to Guinness World Records, in terms of theatrical exhibition, it is the eighth most successful film of all-time when the box office gross is adjusted for inflation.

In 1999, the film was selected for preservation in the United States National Film Registry by the Library of Congress as being "culturally, historically, or aesthetically significant". In June 2008, the American Film Institute revealed its "Ten Top Ten"—the best ten films in ten American film genres—after polling over 1,500 people from the creative community. The film was listed as the tenth best film in the epic genre. The film has aired annually on American network television in prime time during the Passover/Easter season since 1973.

== Plot ==
After hearing the prophecy of a Hebrew deliverer who would free the Hebrews from Egyptian bondage, Pharaoh Rameses I of Egypt orders the death of all newborn Hebrew males. Yochabel saves her infant son by setting him adrift in a basket on the Nile. Rameses I's recently widowed daughter Bithiah finds the basket and decides to adopt the boy by naming him Moses, even though her servant Memnet recognizes the child's Hebrew heritage.

Prince Moses grows up to become a successful general, winning a war against Ethiopia and establishing an alliance. Moses falls in love with Princess Nefretiri, but she is betrothed to whomever Rameses' son, Pharaoh Sethi, chooses to become the next Pharaoh. While building a city for Sethi's jubilee, Moses meets the stonecutter Joshua, who tells him of the Hebrew God. Moses saves an elderly woman from being crushed, not knowing that she is his biological mother, Yochabel, and he reprimands the master builder, Baka. Moses reforms the treatment of slaves on the project, but Prince Rameses, Moses's adoptive brother and Sethi's son, charges him with planning insurrection. Moses says he is merely making the slaves more productive, and after demonstrating the results, Sethi declares him the next Pharaoh.

Nefretiri learns from Memnet that Moses is the son of Hebrew slaves. She kills Memnet, but reveals the story to Moses after he finds the piece of Levite cloth he was wrapped in as a baby, which Memnet had kept. Moses follows Bithiah to Yochabel's house, where he meets his biological mother, brother Aaron, and sister Miriam. Moses learns more about the slaves by working with them. Nefretiri urges him to return to the palace, so that he may help his people when he becomes pharaoh, to which he agrees after he completes a final task. Moses saves Joshua from death by killing Baka, telling Joshua that he, too, is Hebrew. The confession is witnessed by the Hebrew overseer Dathan, who then reports to Rameses. After being arrested, Moses explains that he is not the Deliverer, but would free the slaves if he could. Sethi reluctantly declares Rameses his sole heir, and Rameses banishes Moses to the desert. Moses learns of the death of his mother.

Moses makes his way across the desert to a well in Midian. After defending seven sisters from Amalekites, Moses is housed with the girls' father Jethro, a Madianite sheikh, who worships the God of Abraham. Moses marries Jethro's eldest daughter Sephora. Later, he finds Joshua, who escaped from the hard labor imposed on the Hebrews in Egypt. While herding, Moses sees the burning bush on the summit of Mount Sinai and hears the voice of God. At God's command, Moses returns to Egypt to free the Hebrews.

Moses comes before Rameses, now Pharaoh Rameses II, to win the slaves' freedom, turning his staff into a cobra. Jannes performs the same trick with his staves, but Moses's snake swallows his. Rameses prohibits straw from being provided to Hebrews to make bricks. Nefretiri rescues Moses from being stoned to death by the Hebrews wherein he reveals that he is married. To convince Rameses to oblige his wishes, Moses gets God to initiate plagues against Egypt. Moses turns the River Nile to blood at a festival of Khnum, and brings burning hail down upon Pharaoh's palace. Moses warns him that the next plague will be summoned by Pharaoh himself. Enraged at the plagues, Rameses orders that all first-born sons of Hebrews will die, but a green cloud of death instead kills all the first-born sons of Egypt, including Rameses' and Nefretiri's child.

Despairing at the loss of his heir, Rameses gives in to Moses' demands and frees the Hebrews, who begin the Exodus from Egypt. Bithiah reunites with Moses and goes with the Hebrews. After being taunted by Nefretiri, Rameses takes his chariots and pursues the Hebrews to the Red Sea. Moses uses God's help to stop the Egyptians with a pillar of fire, and parts the Red Sea. After the Hebrews make it across to safety, Moses releases the walls of water, drowning the Egyptian army. A devastated Rameses returns empty-handed to Nefretiri, stating that he now acknowledges Moses's god as God.

Moses again ascends the mountain with Joshua. He receives the Ten Commandments created by God in two stone tablets. Meanwhile, Dathan exploits the people to gain power, claiming that Moses is dead and urging a reluctant Aaron to construct a golden calf idol. A decadent orgy is held by most of the Hebrews. Dathan plans to sacrifice to the calf Lilia, Joshua's girlfriend who was Dathan's sex slave before Joshua's return. After God informs them of the Hebrews' sins, Moses and Joshua descend from the mountain. Enraged at his own people's betrayal of God, Moses deems the Hebrews unworthy and throws the tablets at the calf, destroying it and sending Dathan and his cohorts into the opening earth below. The remaining Hebrews are forced to wander 40 years in the wilderness as punishment for their sins. Moses leads the Hebrews towards Canaan, though he cannot enter himself because he disobeyed God by the Waters of Strife (Meribah). Moses ascends Mount Nebo after charging Joshua to lead the Hebrews, and the film ends with a shot of the Ten Commandments tablets, glowing with fire, over the words, "So it was written[,] So it shall be done."

== Cast ==
Spelling differences exist between the original screenplay characters and the actual biblical/historical persons the role is based upon. The screenplay character Nefretiri is based on the historical/biblical Nefertari. The character Pharaoh Sethi I is based on historical/biblical Pharaoh Seti I. And the character of Prince Rameses / Pharaoh Rameses II is not an inaccurate spelling; however Ramesses—a.k.a. Ramesses the Great—is the preferred translation.

- Charlton Heston as Moses
  - Heston also voices God at the Burning Bush
  - Fraser Heston as the infant Moses
- Yul Brynner as Rameses II
- Anne Baxter as Nefretiri
- Edward G Robinson as Dathan
- Yvonne De Carlo as Sephora
- Debra Paget as Lilia
- John Derek as Joshua
- Sir Cedric Hardwicke as Sethi
- Nina Foch as Bithiah
- Martha Scott as Yochabel
- Judith Anderson as Memnet
- Vincent Price as Baka
- John Carradine as Aaron
- Olive Deering as Miriam
  - Babette Bain as young Miriam
- Douglass Dumbrille as Jannes
- Frank de Kova as Abiram
- Henry Wilcoxon as Pentaur
- Eduard Franz as Jethro
- Donald Curtis as Mered
- Lawrence Dobkin as Hur Ben Caleb
- H. B. Warner as Amminadab
- Julia Faye as Elisheba
- Lisa Mitchell, Noelle Williams, Joanna Merlin, Pat Richard, Joyce Vanderveen, and Diane Hall as Jethro's daughters
- Abbas El Boughdadly as Rameses' charioteer
- John Miljan as the Blind One
- Francis J. McDonald as Simon
- Ian Keith as Rameses I
- Paul De Rolf as child Eleazar
  - Robert Carson as adult Eleazar
- Woodrow Strode as King of Ethiopia
- Tommy Duran as Gershom
- Eugene Mazzola as Rameses' son
- Ramsay Hill as Korah
- Joan Woodbury as Korah's wife
- Esther Brown as Princess Tharbis
- Rushdy Abaza as Hebrew at Golden Calf
- Dorothy Adams as Hebrew slave
- E.J. André as Sheik of Hazeroth
- Henry Corden as Sheik of Sinai
- Michael Ansara as Egyptian taskmaster
- Henry Brandon as Commander of the Hosts
- Mike Connors as Amelakite
- Edna Mae Cooper as Courtier
- Onslow Stevens as Lugal
- Frank Wilcox as Wazir
- Clint Walker as Sardinian
- Luis Alberni as Old Hebrew
- Herb Alpert as Musician

== Production ==
=== Development ===
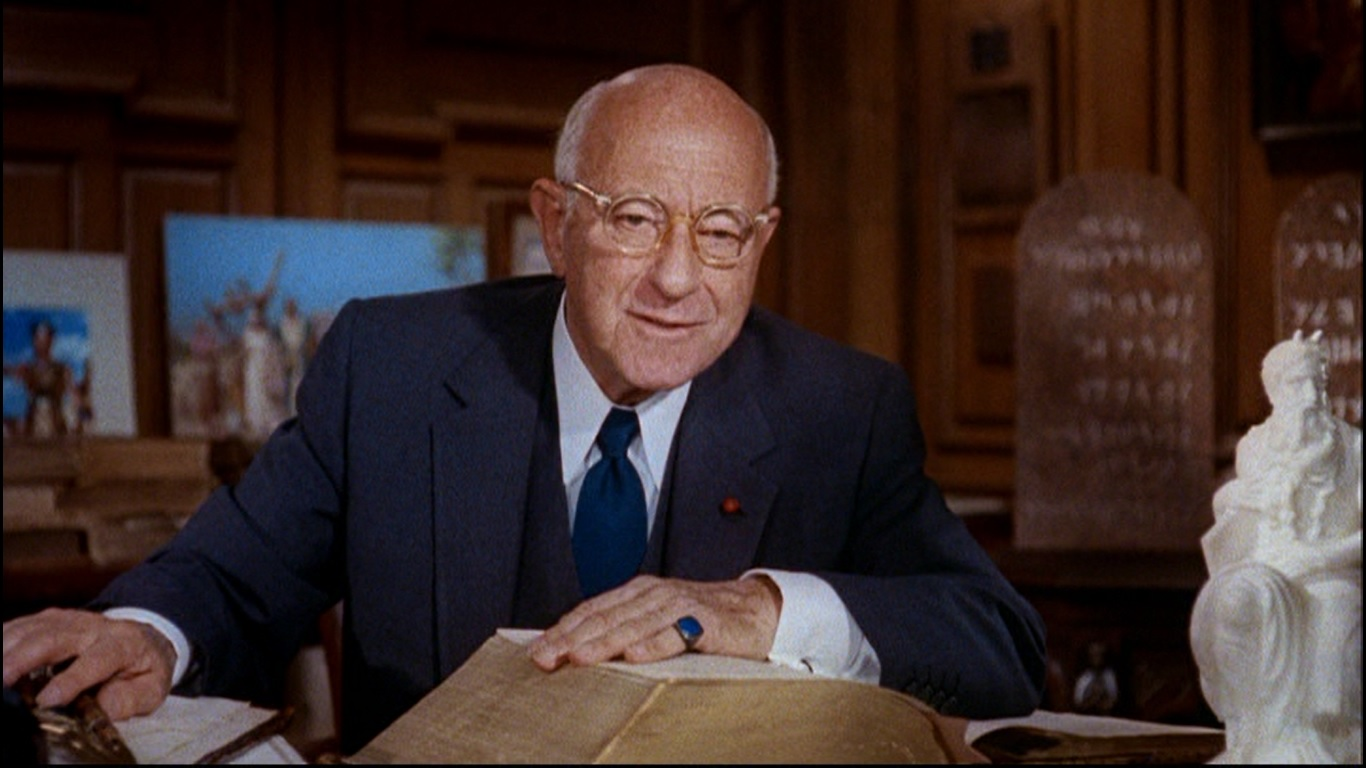
Cecil B. DeMille and his personal copy of the Bible in the film's trailer.

In July 1951, while he was working on his circus film The Greatest Show on Earth, producer-director Cecil B. DeMille chose Homer's Odyssey as the subject of his next epic. Several weeks later, he announced he was going to make a film about the Book of Esther, but then he changed his mind and said he was planning a new film about Helen of Troy, which he eventually canceled. (Note: In late May 1952, DeMille said he would not film the story of Helen because another company had a priority on registration. Warner Bros. released Helen of Troy in 1956.) For more than twenty years and especially after World War II, DeMille had received letters from people worldwide who asked him to make a new version of his 1923 silent film The Ten Commandments because the world "needs a reminder, they said, of the Law of God", which "is the essential bedrock of human freedom." DeMille talked about the idea with his staff and they initially considered producing it as a modern story with a biblical prologue, like the original film. A suggestion was to have the contemporary protagonist be an honest politician struggling with "forces aligned against him" and show through that conflict the effects of keeping or breaking the Ten Commandments. DeMille discarded the present-day storyline because he kept thinking about the first film's biblical section, which was "still not dated". Another early concept was to film the story of the Exodus, led by Moses, with interconnected subplots involving Israelites whose lives reflect each of the Ten Commandments. DeMille wrote that he thought the final choice—to let the biblical story "speak for itself"—was the "soundest". He said the biblical account was "timeless" and "timely", and that when "Moses led his people to Mount Sinai, they learned, as the world today must learn, that true freedom is freedom under God."

After The Greatest Show on Earth was released, DeMille went to Paramount Pictures to discuss his next film with the studio's executives, including Barney Balaban and Adolph Zukor. He had already made up his mind to direct a new version of The Ten Commandments that would incorporate Moses' life as an Egyptian prince. He had to "sell" the idea to them and, although only Zukor and Y. Frank Freeman championed it, all accepted it. Some Paramount businessmen were not too keen about another biblical film, and one of those even questioned the film's title, saying "You won't call it The Ten Commandments, of course." When he heard this, Zukor leapt from his seat and made it clear that there would be no other title for the film but that one.

In June 1952, DeMille formally informed the press that his next production would be a Technicolor remake of his successful silent film The Ten Commandments (1923). From the beginning, his plan was to produce the film on a "lavish scale" with "a cast of outstanding stars" and a budget that would allow it "to possess the quality and spectacular values that have earned for DeMille the title of 'Hollywood's master showman.'" DeMille explained why he decided to revisit Moses' story:

I feel that the subject of Moses and the Ten Commandments is particularly timely today. Not only does it provide all the ingredients for exciting and spectacular motion picture entertainment for mass audiences of all ages throughout the world, but it is in line with the spiritual reawakening of all nations of the free world in these troubled times. A constant stream of letters to me from all parts of America and from foreign countries for the past few years, and particularly of late, has proved this and has largely influenced me to the subject of Moses, the heroic figure revered by Jews and Christians alike.

In October 1952, DeMille told reporter Bob Thomas, "The actual shooting is the easiest part of making a picture. It is here in the production office that the picture is really created." He was already working on methods for the parting of the Red Sea, and his initial plans included shooting Egyptian backgrounds in fall 1953, six months of Hollywood filming in 1954, and a late 1955 release date.

In January 1953, DeMille said he was interested in 3D film and was already aware of Paramount's 3D experiments. By February, he had seen "interesting" CinemaScope tests which yielded "good" results, but he also thought about the impact widescreen film would have on close-ups. That same month, DeMille decided to postpone production for a year to wait for the development of new film formats. "You can just say that The Ten Commandments will be made in the most advanced form of film production available at the time I start shooting," he told the United Press. In July, it was reported that the film would be shot in England, but in October, DeMille secured a deal with Egyptian president Mohamed Naguib to film in Egypt and use the Egyptian cavalry for the chariot scenes. In March 1954, DeMille informed that he had tested every format and chose Paramount's VistaVision as "the best medium in which this story should be told."

=== Writing ===
As the on-screen credits declare, The Holy Scriptures are the predominant source of the film's narrative. (Note: DeMille gave the Bible the special place at the end of the credits, calling it "The Holy Scriptures" and providing it with its own full title card.) DeMille chose to use the 17th-century King James Version, which he grew up reading. Moses' biography is found in the Hebrew Bible's Torah, also called the "Five Books of Moses". In order to depict Moses' early years in Egypt, DeMille searched for extrabiblical sources that expanded on Moses' life as a young man. He said, "There is a lapse of 26 years between two verses of the Bible. One verse tells of Moses being found among the bulrushes, or papyrus, by the Pharaoh's daughter and in the next verse he is grown and has killed a man. We have to find out what happened to him between those two events."

Henry Noerdlinger, the film's researcher, consulted ancient historical texts, such as On the Life of Moses by Philo, Antiquities of the Jews by Josephus, Preparation for the Gospel by Eusebius, the Midrash Rabbah on Exodus, and the Mishnah. Philo and Josephus describe the prince Moses as the heir to the throne of Egypt, and the Midrash states that both his adoptive mother (the Pharaoh's daughter) and the Pharaoh had great affection for him. Josephus and Eusebius also say that Moses, as the commander of the Egyptian army, prevented the Ethiopians from invading Egypt and conquered their nation; he was also the subject of court intrigues against him. Moses' concern for the overworked Hebrew slaves, his implementation of their weekly "day of rest", and Dathan as the witness to Moses' slaying of an Egyptian man were details taken from the Midrash.

DeMille also found and modified names for several people related to Moses. In the Book of Exodus, the Egyptian princess who adopted Moses is not named, but the Midrash identifies her as the woman "Bithiah the daughter of Pharaoh, which Mered took" mentioned in the Book of Chronicles. DeMille preferred the spelling "Sephora", found in the Douay–Rheims Bible, for the name of Moses' wife, originally Zipporah in the Hebrew Bible and King James version. To make it more euphonious, the name of Moses' Hebrew mother Jochebed was changed by DeMille to "Yochabel", which is a transliteration from Josephus' Greek text.

In 1952, DeMille bought the screen rights to Dorothy Clarke Wilson's best-selling novel Prince of Egypt (1949), from which he got several subplots and characters, including the "lively" Egyptian princess Nefretiri and her romance with Moses. In the book, Nefretiri is the heiress to the throne as the daughter of Pharaoh Sethi I and older sister of Rameses, while the adopted prince Moses is rumored to be the illegitimate child of an Egyptian princess and a Mitannian prince. Memnet, a character from the novel, is Nefretiri's old nurse who detests Moses and reveals the secret of his real Hebrew parentage; she is later "silenced" when Nefretiri pushes her off a balcony. Baka, a foreman commissioned by Sethi to build a new city in the Nile Delta, is Wilson's depiction of the Egyptian that Moses killed.

DeMille also found another novel about Moses titled On Eagle's Wings (1939) by English minister and author Arthur Eustace Southon, who sold the screen rights to the director in 1953. The film was also based on Pillar of Fire by Joseph Holt Ingraham.

To write the film's screenplay, DeMille chose Jewish screenwriters Jesse L. Lasky Jr. and Fredric M. Frank, who wrote the script of his previous biblical epic, Samson and Delilah. He also hired two writers he had never collaborated with before, Aeneas MacKenzie and Jack Gariss. DeMille said MacKenzie had "piercing insight into dramatic values" and a "fine sense of story construction", and he described Gariss as "deeply thoughtful and sensitively attuned to the spiritual no less the dramatic values of our theme". Lasky Jr. remembered MacKenzie as "a peppery Scotsman" and "a fine film dramatist and a walking encyclopedia of obscure information", and he considered Gariss "a tower of erudition, exuding infinite tranquility and mysticism." DeMille noted that, during their story conferences, he and the writers alternated "in the roles of hammer and anvil" and that when "sparks" flew, they "glow[ed] with the intelligence and wit" of the four who worked with him.

According to Lasky Jr., the screenplay was divided into the four main phases of Moses' life as prince, shepherd, deliverer, lawgiver; the screenwriters worked individually and all wrote parts of each of the four sections. In order to brief the screenwriters and ensure historical accuracy, Noerdlinger wrote "pertinent notes" based on his research, for which he studied 950 books, 984 periodicals, 1,286 clippings, and 2,964 photographs. Lasky Jr. and Noerdlinger stated that the rivalry between Moses and Rameses and Sethi's erasure of Moses' name were based on altered reliefs of a Karnak temple, which hint that Rameses had a disinherited older brother whose name was obliterated from the records. Lasky Jr. was chosen by DeMille to write the scene of the first Passover. DeMille ultimately entrusted Lasky Jr. with the task of revising the screenplay "for consistency's sake". The script contained many scenes that were either cut or not filmed, including a longer prologue that depicted stories from the Book of Genesis. Written over a period of three years, the 308-page screenplay was considered the longest ever for a Hollywood film.

=== Casting ===
==== Leading roles ====
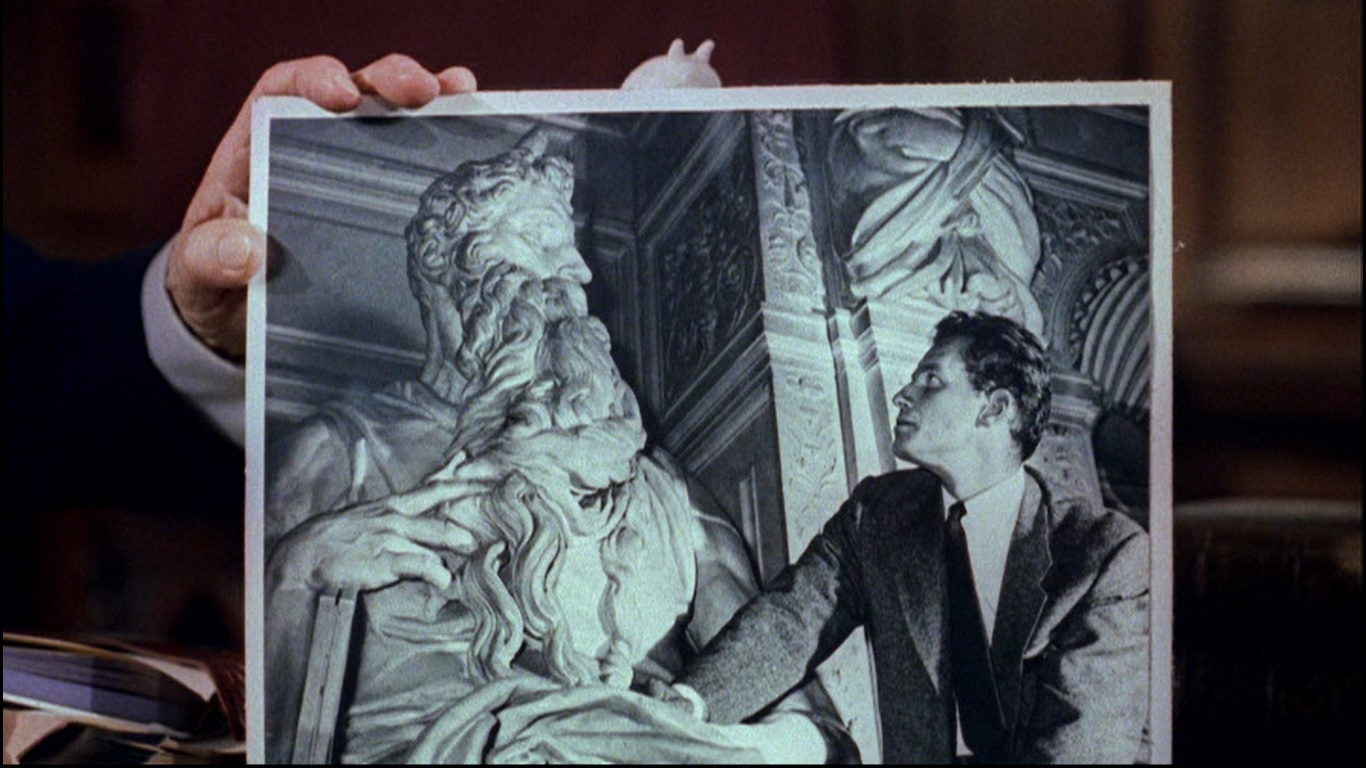
DeMille holds a photograph of Charlton Heston looking at Michelangelo's Moses. Heston's resemblance to the sculpture helped him win the role of Moses.

In December 1952, Jeff Chandler sought the role of Moses in the upcoming DeMille epic. In October 1953, DeMille said his favorite choice was Charlton Heston, the star of his previous film, The Greatest Show on Earth. He also considered casting a middle-aged man. In December, DeMille offered the part to quinquagenarian actor William Boyd, who was famous for his portrayal of cowboy Hopalong Cassidy on television and had worked with DeMille in the silent era, but Boyd's representative said the actor was "worried that it will be out of character." In January 1954, Dan Dailey said he wanted to play Moses in DeMille's film. The following month, Heston and Kirk Douglas were reported to be two of the many top stars who wanted the role. In May, DeMille briefly considered Rock Hudson after he saw him in Magnificent Obsession. Interviewed twice by the director, Heston finally won the role when he impressed DeMille with his knowledge of Moses and ancient Egypt and his strong resemblance to Michelangelo's sculpture of Moses. (Note: Associate producer Henry Wilcoxon said he drew the statue's beard on a photo of Heston and showed it to DeMille. In his autobiography, Heston wrote that, by the time of the second interview, he had read most of the King James version of Exodus and Deuteronomy and had researched the Third Dynasty in James Henry Breasted's A History of Egypt.) Heston was later chosen to be the voice of God in the Burning Bush, toned down to a softer and lower register.

DeMille described the role of Rameses II as "a part equal in dramatic strength to that of Moses". Rory Calhoun, Jeff Chandler, Anthony Dexter, Mel Ferrer, Stewart Granger, William Holden, and Michael Rennie were considered to play Moses' opponent and rival for the Egyptian throne. In New York City, DeMille's granddaughter and his secretary convinced him to see the Broadway musical The King and I, starring Yul Brynner. DeMille recalled, "During the first act, they wondered why I said nothing. I couldn't. I was seeing a rare theatrical experience—a performance of dramatic integrity." The director went backstage to meet the star. He told Brynner the story of the film from Rameses' point of view, and offered him the role. "Nobody has ever been allowed backstage during intermission but everybody gets awed by DeMille," remembered Brynner. "I was fascinated by him. He showed me material for a picture and I agreed to do that and another film. We shook hands. It all happened in seven and a half minutes!" In April 1953, Brynner was already in Hollywood talking with DeMille about the part, and in October it was confirmed that he was the first actor to be cast in the film.

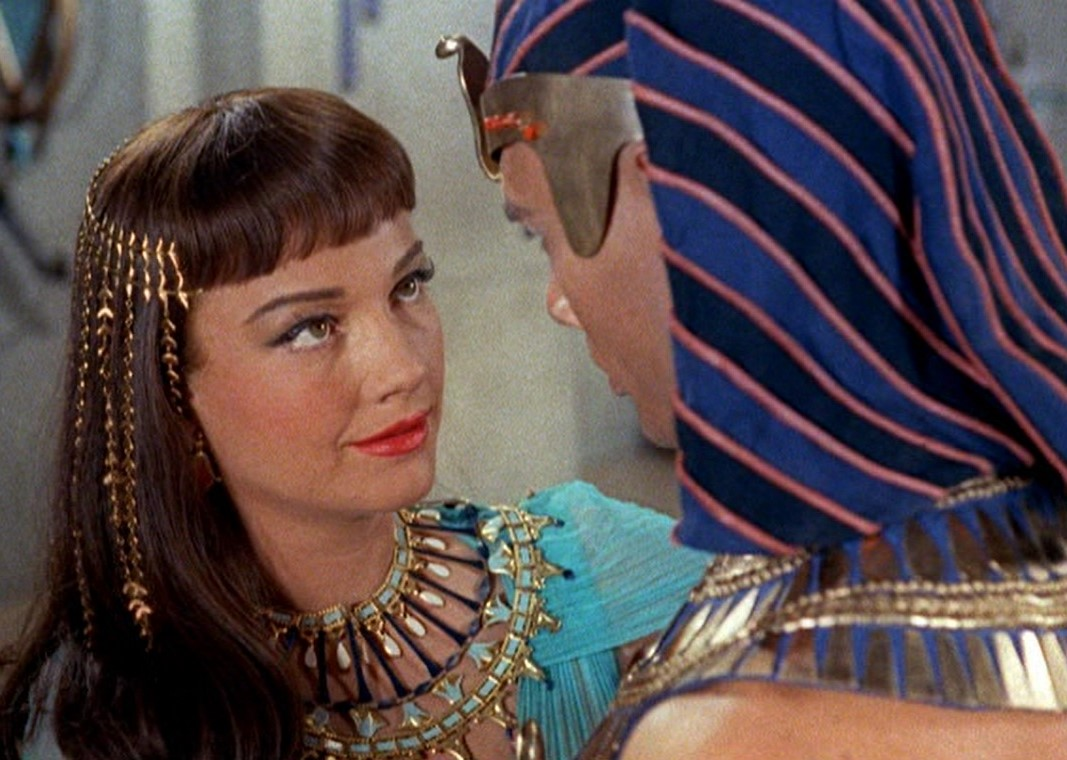
"Nefretiri ruled the glamor arena some 3,200 years ago", wrote Anne Baxter, "and it's surprising how much the ladies of that day knew about the art of stalking a man."

In October 1953, DeMille said he wanted Audrey Hepburn to play the role of Rameses' wife, Nefretiri. In February 1954, his office was said to be full of photographs of Hepburn, but he later noticed her figure was not curvaceous enough for Nefretiri's form-fitting gowns. In May, DeMille asked Vanessa Brown if she "could fill out the clinging, revealing Egyptian costumes". She assured him she could, but also warned him that she had "unattractive feet". Ann Blyth, Joan Evans, Rhonda Fleming, Coleen Gray, Jane Griffiths, Vivien Leigh, and Joan Taylor were also considered. In June, columnist Louella Parsons regarded the part of Nefretiri as "the most sought-after role of the year". That same month, DeMille chose Anne Baxter after he screened her film Carnival Story at home three times. His other top choice was Jane Russell, who wanted the part. "There was only one DeMille, and there wasn't an actor in the world who didn't want to work for him just once, however short the salary or tall the corn", Baxter wrote in her memoir.

Many actors were considered for the role of the evil overseer Dathan. (Note: For the role of Dathan, DeMille considered actors Raymond Burr, Lee J. Cobb, Leo Genn, Victor Jory, Fredric March, Raymond Massey, Stephen McNally, Gary Merrill, Arnold Moss, Robert Newton, Hugh O'Brian, Jack Palance, Eric Pohlmann, Basil Rathbone, Dale Robertson, Robert Ryan, George Sanders, Everett Sloane, and Peter Ustinov.) DeMille was enthusiastic about Jack Palance as Dathan, but Palance's agent angered DeMille when he stole a part of the script and demanded that the part be rewritten. Raymond Massey was signed for the role, but later turned it down. In September 1954, DeMille cast Edward G. Robinson in the role of the "quisling who fights Moses all the way through the picture." Robinson had been blacklisted in Hollywood because of his "former political leanings" and needed "recognition again by a top figure in the industry." Someone had suggested him for the role but thought he could not be hired. In his autobiography, Robinson remembered, "Mr. DeMille wanted to know why, coldly reviewed the matter, felt I had been done an injustice, and told his people to offer me the part. Cecil B. DeMille returned me to films. Cecil B. DeMille restored my self-respect."

For the role of Sephora, the Midianite shepherdess who becomes Moses' wife, more than 20 actresses were under consideration. (Note: Judith Ames, Anne Bancroft, Anne Baxter, Shirley Booth, Diane Brewster, Peggie Castle, June Clayworth, Linda Darnell, Laura Elliot, Rhonda Fleming, Rita Gam, Grace Kelly, Jacqueline Green, Barbara Hale, Allison Hayes, Frances Lansing, Patricia Neal, Marie Palmer, Jean Peters, Ruth Roman, Barbara Rush, and Elizabeth Sellars were considered for the part.) Grace Kelly, DeMille's first choice, was unavailable. In May 1954, television actress Maria Riva, Marlene Dietrich's daughter, was said to be the director's number-one choice for the role. In July, he signed Merle Oberon for the part. He interviewed Rita Gam and asked her if she believed in God, but she said she did not. In the process of casting the role of Bithiah, he screened the MGM film Sombrero and was "very much impressed" with Yvonne De Carlo's portrayal of a "saintly type of woman". DeMille said he "sensed in her a depth, an emotional power, a womanly strength which the part of Sephora needed and which she gave it." De Carlo had always wanted to play a starring role for DeMille, so she accepted the part and did not care how much he would pay her. She later thought, "Actually, that's probably why he got away with paying such low salaries. He did know that most dedicated actors would work for him for nothing."

In April 1955, columnist Erskine Johnson noticed, "Anne Baxter and Charlton Heston got top billing over some other very important stars (Yvonne De Carlo and Edward G. Robinson, for instance) in The Ten Commandments. So far, the others aren't squawking."

==== Supporting roles ====
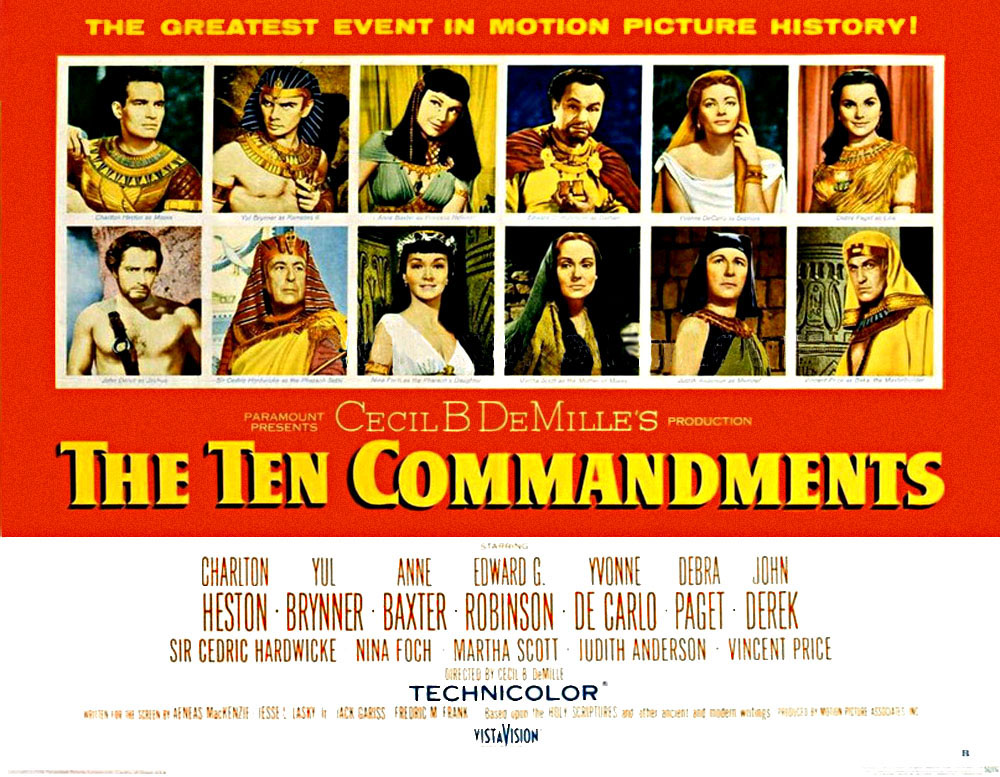
Portraits of the film's 12 stars figured prominently in this 1956 poster.

DeMille considered several leading ladies for the part of Lilia, (Note: DeMille's casting journal contains a list that includes Vanessa Brown, Pat Crowley, Piper Laurie, Irene Montwill, Lori Nelson, Cathy O'Donnell, Jean Peters, Donna Reed, Karen Sharpe, and Elaine Stewart.) the young Hebrew woman who gives water to the slaves. He originally chose Pier Angeli, but MGM refused to loan their contract star to Paramount. In September 1954, DeMille borrowed Debra Paget from 20th Century-Fox and cast her in the role of the "lissome and beatific slave girl". Paget later became a born-again Christian. She said, "I think my evangelical work was foreshadowed when Cecil B. DeMille chose me for The Ten Commandments and said, 'I feel the hand of God has been on you.'"

For the role of Joshua, the Hebrew stonecutter destined to succeed Moses, DeMille looked at a number of actors. (Note: The actors he considered were Jeff Chandler, Tony Curtis, Vince Edwards, Eric Fleming, Arthur Franz, Rock Hudson, Brian Keith, Cameron Mitchell, George Nader, Jack Palance, Michael Pate, Richard Todd, and Clint Walker.) In June 1954, he chose Cornel Wilde, one of the stars of his previous film, The Greatest Show on Earth. Wilde's casting was widely mentioned in the press, but the actor made his "worst mistake" and said the part was too small. In September, Wilde turned it down because he did not see "eye-to-eye" with DeMille. In October, DeMille gave the role to Paramount actor John Derek. In his autobiography, DeMille remarked, "Cornel Wilde declined the role […] thus giving John Derek his opportunity for a noteworthy performance."

In May 1954, Sir Cedric Hardwicke got the supporting role of Pharaoh Sethi "the Just" and became one of the first actors signed for the film. It took DeMille longer to find an actress to play Sethi's sister and Moses' adoptive mother, Bithiah. He had offered the part to Joan Crawford in January, and also considered other famous actresses. (Note: DeMille's other choices were Claudette Colbert (the star of his 1934 epic Cleopatra), Bette Davis, Rosemary DeCamp, Irene Dunne, Merle Oberon, and Alexis Smith.) His favorite choice, Jayne Meadows, declined the role because she did not want to leave her home in New York. Associate producer Henry Wilcoxon recommended his Scaramouche co-star Nina Foch, who signed for the part in September. In October, John Carradine won the role of Moses' brother, Aaron.

I think all of us, you know, Eddie Robinson, myself, Judith Anderson, we all really wanted to be in a DeMille picture. We really felt that you couldn't call yourself a star unless you had been in a DeMille picture! So we all took these sort of small, but rather arresting parts.

— Vincent Price, Vincent Price: A Daughter's Biography

DeMille wanted a "strong dramatic actress" to portray Moses' real mother, Yochabel. In March 1955, he selected Martha Scott for the role after he saw her performance in William Wyler's The Desperate Hours (1955). That same month, Judith Anderson was cast as Memnet. (Note: For this role, DeMille considered Bette Davis, Marjorie Rambeau, Flora Robson, and Marie Windsor. He chose Anderson when he screened Alfred Hitchcock's Rebecca and saw her performance in that film.) Also in March, Basil Rathbone said he wanted to work for DeMille and wrote him for the part of Baka in the film: "I wanted it for the record as this probably will be DeMille's last picture and I knew there was a real good heavy in the script—a real heel type—but C. B. gave it to Vincent Price instead."

DeMille considered Heston's wife, Lydia Clarke, for the role of Moses' sister, Miriam, but she became pregnant and the director assigned the part to Olive Deering, who had portrayed another Miriam in DeMille's Samson and Delilah (1949). Heston's newborn son, Fraser (born February 12, 1955), was cast by DeMille (on the suggestion of Henry Wilcoxon, who said to him: "The timing's just right. If it's a boy, who better to play the Baby Moses?") as soon as Heston announced to DeMille that his wife Lydia was pregnant. Fraser Heston was three months old during filming.

DeMille interviewed and signed Los Angeles City College drama major Esther Brown for the role of the Ethiopian princess Tharbis, a part he had first offered to Dorothy Dandridge. Henry Wilcoxon was chosen to play the Egyptian military commander in both Egypt and Hollywood to provide continuity in the Exodus scenes, and his wife, Joan Woodbury, was cast as Korah's wife in the golden calf sequence. Two cast members of the 1923 silent version, Julia Faye (who played Rameses' wife) and Edna Mae Cooper, were given the roles of Moses' sister-in-law Elisheba and a lady of the pharaoh's court, respectively. DeMille saw Gail Kobe eating in the studio commissary and gave her the role of Nefretiri's personal servant. Pat Hitchcock was cast as an Egyptian noblewoman.

DeMille was reluctant to cast anyone who had appeared in The Egyptian, a rival production at the time. Exceptions to this are the casting of John Carradine and Mimi Gibson in credited supporting roles. Seven casting directors hired actors to play 53 star and featured roles, 488 speaking parts, and 100 dancers.

=== Art direction and set design ===
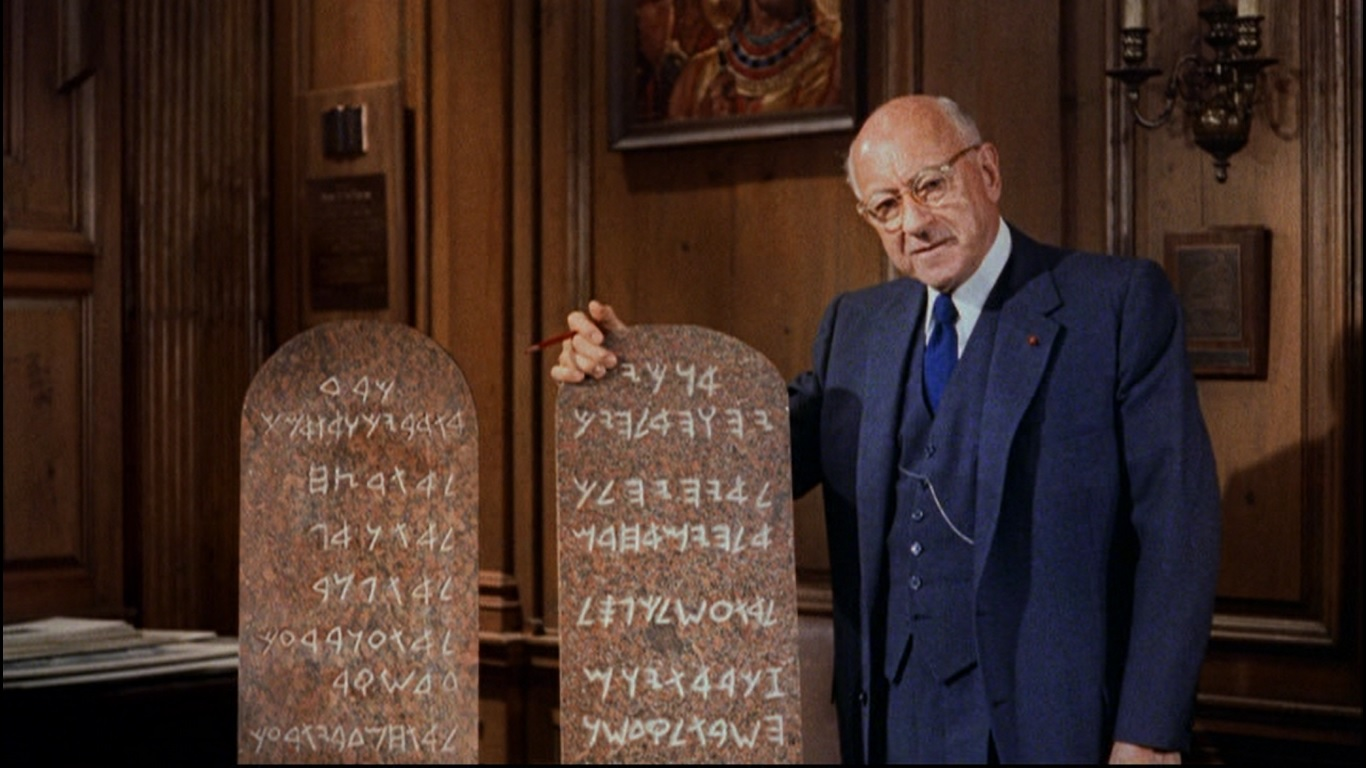
DeMille with the tablets that were carved from the granite of Mount Sinai.

Hal Pereira, Walter H. Tyler, and Albert Nozaki were in charge of the film's art direction. In 1952, DeMille commissioned concept art from Italian artist Fortunino Matania, who made paintings of several scenes in the film, including those of Moses defending Jethro's daughters and the golden calf revelry. In 1953, officials of the Metropolitan Museum of Art recommended artist Arnold Friberg to Paramount and DeMille. Friberg was hired to paint scenes that would "set the dramatic stage for the production." He painted a new version of the Paramount mountain logo with "dramatic lighting" and designed the lettering of the film's titles.

DeMille had tablets of the Ten Commandments hewn from the dark red granite of Mount Sinai. The Commandments inscribed on the tablets were written in ancient Canaanite letters by Dr. Ralph Marcus of the Oriental Institute of the University of Chicago. DeMille asked Paramount scenic artist A.J. Ciraolo to make six different sets of the tablets for lighting purposes. Ciraolo's replicas of the tablets were made of wooden cores covered in fiberglass, which was then chipped and hand-painted to resemble the Sinai granite.

An artist named Roy Rulin designed the golden calf and numerous props and décor for the film. DeMille's film crew also bought props from the 20th Century-Fox production The Egyptian, including the "hounds and jackals" game. In March 1954, Walter M. Scott, Fox's set decorator, said: "We have made 5,000 different items for the picture. Now the others want to borrow our things. We've already had four men from Cecil B. DeMille over here to see what they can use in [his film]." (Note: As the events in The Egyptian take place 70 years before the reign of Rameses II, an unintentional sense of continuity was created.) Paramount's backlot and train shed were turned into temporary workshops, where several assembly lines made most of the 70,000 props used in the film.

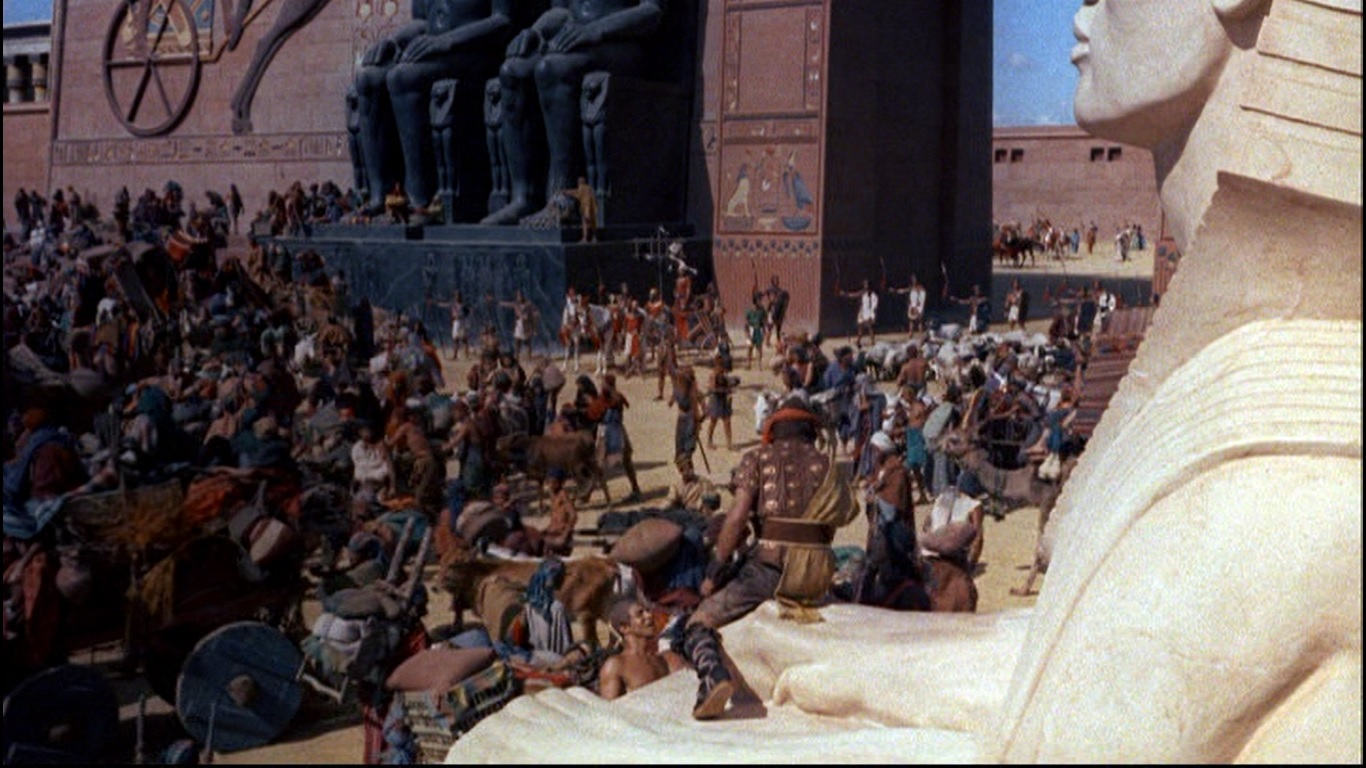
The Per-Rameses set was built near Cairo.

The gate of the city of Per-Rameses, a replica of the set from DeMille's 1923 silent film, was designed by an architect named Anis Serag El Dine. Said to be "the biggest film set ever built", the pylon was 107 feet (33 m) high and 325 feet (99 m) long and cost more than $250,000. The 60-acre Per-Rameses set (alternatively called Tanis) was constructed near Cairo, Egypt, between Saqqara and the Giza pyramid complex, and also included a city wall, four statues of Rameses, and an avenue of sphinxes. DeMille ordered the construction of wooden pyramids that appear to be covered in alabaster; they stood on stilts so they could be seen rising above the horizon. Behind the facade of the set, there were a mess tent, a wardrobe department, and a stable for horses.

67 master sets, not including the gate of Per-Rameses, were constructed for the film. The sets required 950,000 board feet of lumber; 11,200 pounds of nails; 1,540 tons of plaster; and 4,725 gallons of paint. 2,400 tons of soil that matched or were dyed to match Egyptian soil were trucked into the studio's soundstages for the ground of various sets, such as the streets of Goshen, the brickpits, and Sethi's unfinished city. Some studio sets were so large they occupied an entire soundstage each. These included Sethi's throne room, Nefretiri's quarters, and the Hebrew village. DeMille used thousands of real flowers for the Ethiopian tribute scene, the fabrication of garlands, and the decoration of hairstyles, tables, and food platters; he ordered lilies from Hawaii and lotuses from British Guiana.

=== Costume design ===
Edith Head, Ralph Jester, John Jensen, Dorothy Jeakins, and Arnold Friberg received on-screen credit for the film's costumes. Jensen and Friberg made drawings and paintings of their designs, while Head and Jeakins worked on the costumes with the actresses and actors, respectively. A team of ten designers and sketch artists planned a total of 25,000 costumes, and it took 125 tailors and dressmakers more than a year to complete them. The costumes required 300 leopard, lion, and zebra skins; 2,500 pairs of made-to-order sandals; and 40,000 yards of material that were specially woven or dyed. Ten jewelers created 1,100 pieces of jewelry and bejeweled props. 98 wardrobe people were hired.

Friberg designed Moses' distinctive robe in red with black and white stripes, and the film's researchers later discovered that these colors were traditionally associated with the Israelite tribe Moses belonged to, the Tribe of Levi. According to Friberg, the costume was woven on an ancient loom using goat's hair, although the film's publicity stated it was made from jute, wool, and linen fibers. As a gift, after the production, DeMille gave Moses' robe to Friberg, who had it in his possession until his death in 2010.

The Pharaohs in the film (Rameses I, Sethi, Rameses II) are shown wearing the nemes royal headdress or the red-and-white crown of Upper and Lower Egypt. For his pursuit of the Israelites, Rameses II wears the blue khepresh helmet-crown, which the pharaohs wore for battle. Paramount's makeup department made a plaster cast of Yul Brynner's head so his helmet could fit perfectly. The shirt Sethi wears in his death scene was inspired by the design of a tunic that belonged to Tutankhamun. In the second half of the film, Rameses II wears a royal robe that is an adaptation of the vulture cloak design on Tutankhamun's second coffin and a miniature one in his tomb.

Edith Head designed the costumes of the main female characters, including Nefretiri. Anne Baxter wrote that she and Head had fittings on the "unbelievably extravagant" gowns for eight months. Baxter wanted to wear a putty nose to look more Egyptian, but DeMille preferred her real nose. Head's designs for Nefretiri were inspired by the life-size depictions of the real queen inside her tomb in the Valley of the Queens. Nefretiri's vulture crown and gold-cloth dress with protective wings were copied from a painting in the tomb and the statue of Karomama, the Divine Adoratrice of Amun.

Egyptian wall paintings were the source for LeRoy Prinz's choreography of the lively dance performed by a circle of young women at Sethi's jubilee. Their movements and costumes are based on art from the tomb of the Sixth Dynasty Vizier Mehu in Saqqara and a tomb in Deir el-Gabrawi.

Some of the film's cast members, such as Debra Paget, John Derek, Nina Foch, and Eduard Franz, wore brown contact lenses, at the behest of DeMille, in order to conceal their light-colored eyes which were considered inadequate for their roles. Paget once said that, "If it hadn't been for the lenses I wouldn't have got the part." However, she also said that the lenses were "awful to work in because the Klieg lights heat them up". When DeMille interviewed Yvonne De Carlo for the role of Sephora, he admired her "wonderful gray eyes" but told her that the part would require her to wear brown contact lenses and De Carlo agreed. Although she had her lenses properly fitted by an ophthalmologist, De Carlo could not manage to keep them from popping out of her eyes. DeMille ultimately decided to have De Carlo appear on-screen with her natural eye color because he felt her eyes were her "main asset" and he was not going to modify "a God-given treasure."

=== Filming ===
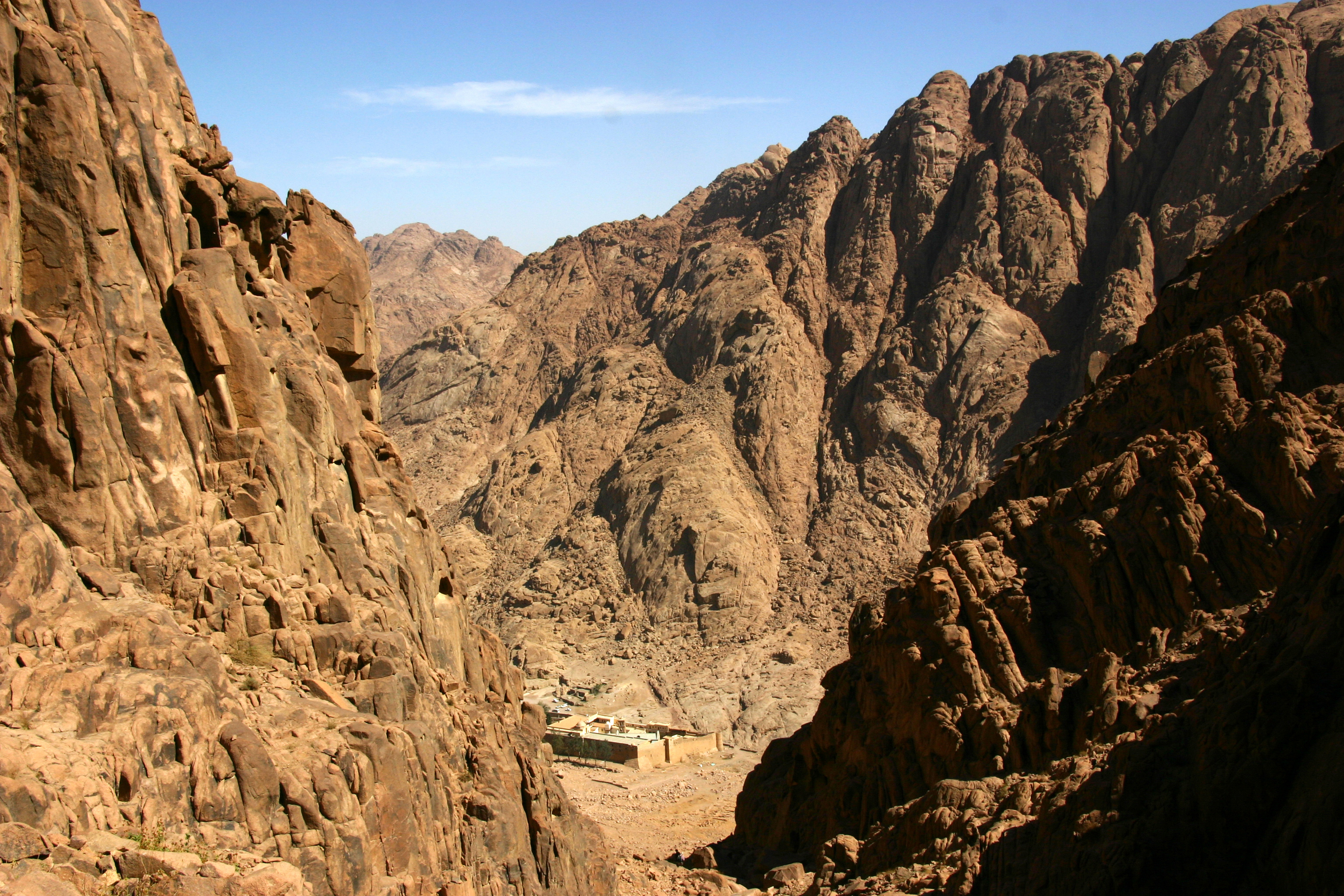
A view of St. Catherine's Monastery from Mount Sinai

From New York City, DeMille sailed for Egypt on September 23, 1954. On October 6, he arrived in Cairo to make "the greatest production of my life"; the following day, he met the Prime Minister of Egypt, Colonel Gamal Abdel Nasser. DeMille had two meetings with Nasser and Abdel Hakim Amer, Egypt's Minister of War. Nasser and Amer were fans of DeMille's 1935 film The Crusades and especially of its star, Henry Wilcoxon, the associate producer of The Ten Commandments. The first day of filming was October 14. DeMille said that the journey from Cairo to Mount Sinai can be made "by motor car in one long, hard day", but he and his crew traveled with a two-car caravan in case one of the cars broke down. They made a stop in Abu Rudeis, where they camped overnight, and reached Saint Catherine's Monastery by sunset of the second day. The Greek Orthodox monks gave DeMille a blessing before he started to scout locations on Mount Sinai. On a hill near the monastery, DeMille encountered a Bedouin woman who (according to an Egyptian interpreter) said, "Sirs, you are welcome. We are too poor to offer you any gifts, but we offer you our welcome." (Note: In her audio commentary, Katherine Orrison mentions this greeting and says it is the origin of Sephora's line, "We can offer you little, but we offer all we have.") The first scenes shot in Egypt included the ones on the summit of Mount Sinai. DeMille and the film crew spent several days and nights living in tents on "a plateau high above the monastery, near the very top of the holy mountain." On their way back to Cairo, DeMille and the crew made a couple of stops to film shots of the Red Sea.

DeMille and 20 assistant directors who spoke English and Arabic directed 8,000 people in the Exodus sequence. The Cavalry Corps of the Egyptian Armed Forces portrayed the Pharaoh's chariot host. Yul Brynner flew from New York City to film the scene where Rameses and his chariots leave the city. In November, DeMille suffered a heart attack after he climbed the 107-foot-tall Egyptian pylon set to see one of John P. Fulton's special effects shots. Egyptian doctors advised DeMille to stay in bed for "an indefinite number of weeks", but DeMille wanted to go back to work as soon as he could and took medication from Dr. Max Jacobson. After ten weeks in Egypt, DeMille and Heston returned to the United States on November 24. The second unit's final day of production in Egypt was December 3, 1954. DeMille refused an offer from the Egyptian government to turn the Gates of Per-Rameses into a museum and instead ordered its demolition because he knew other production companies would use the set.

The Hollywood footage was shot between March and August 1955. Principal photography began on March 28 with a scene with Anne Baxter and Judith Anderson. DeMille started each day of filming with rehearsals for camera and actor movements, and then he would the film the master or tracking shot of the scene in less than six takes and later work his way through the closer angles. In April, Hedda Hopper wrote in her column that the Ten Commandments set "is something to see." In late May, columnist Louella Parsons visited the set of the film, described DeMille as "our greatest director", and said the film "should be the greatest ever made in the history of motion pictures." That same month, the scenes with the infant Moses were filmed.

Under DeMille's direction, the film's cast members performed their roles in the theatrical style of acting. Anne Baxter later remembered, "I loved slinking around—really, this was silent film acting but with dialogue. No shading was permitted. 'Louder! Better!' That's what DeMille roared at everybody." Yvonne De Carlo said that DeMille wanted "florid" acting and would often shout, "More! More!" Vincent Price similarly recalled, "I'd do a rehearsal and C. B. would thunder, 'More! More passion! More understanding!' What he was asking for was the Victorian way of acting, so I'd throw my hands around." In his memoirs, Sir Cedric Hardwicke stated, "I enjoyed working with DeMille, who of all the directors I have met was the only one who really knew what he wanted—he and Olivier. In his seventies, DeMille's energy was unbelievable." On the set of the film, DeMille was initially not satisfied with Edward G. Robinson's portrayal of Dathan, but he admired and respected Robinson and did not say anything to him. After he saw the dailies of Dathan's first scenes, DeMille was pleased with the "sardonic humor" Robinson gave to the originally serious character.

In July, DeMille was directing shots of the Red Sea sequence in which Heston and 150 extras stand on a hill. He played thunder sound effects on the set so the actors would look frightened. In early August, DeMille was filming the lower part of the scene of the rising obelisk, which was an exterior set built next to the Lasky-DeMille Barn. On August 15, DeMille was directing approximately 500 extras for the filming of the "matching shots" of the Exodus sequence. In late August, he was directing the scenes where Moses comes down from Mount Sinai and finds his people worshiping the golden calf. Robinson liked Dathan's last scene and remained friends with Jesse L. Lasky Jr. He later told Lasky, "You gave me the greatest exit a 'heavy' ever had. No actor would break friendship with a writer who created a tempest, then an earthquake, then opened a fissure and had me fall through into hell. Even in Little Caesar I never had an exit as good as that!" The last scene Heston and Brynner filmed was the final confrontation between Moses and Rameses.

=== Special effects ===
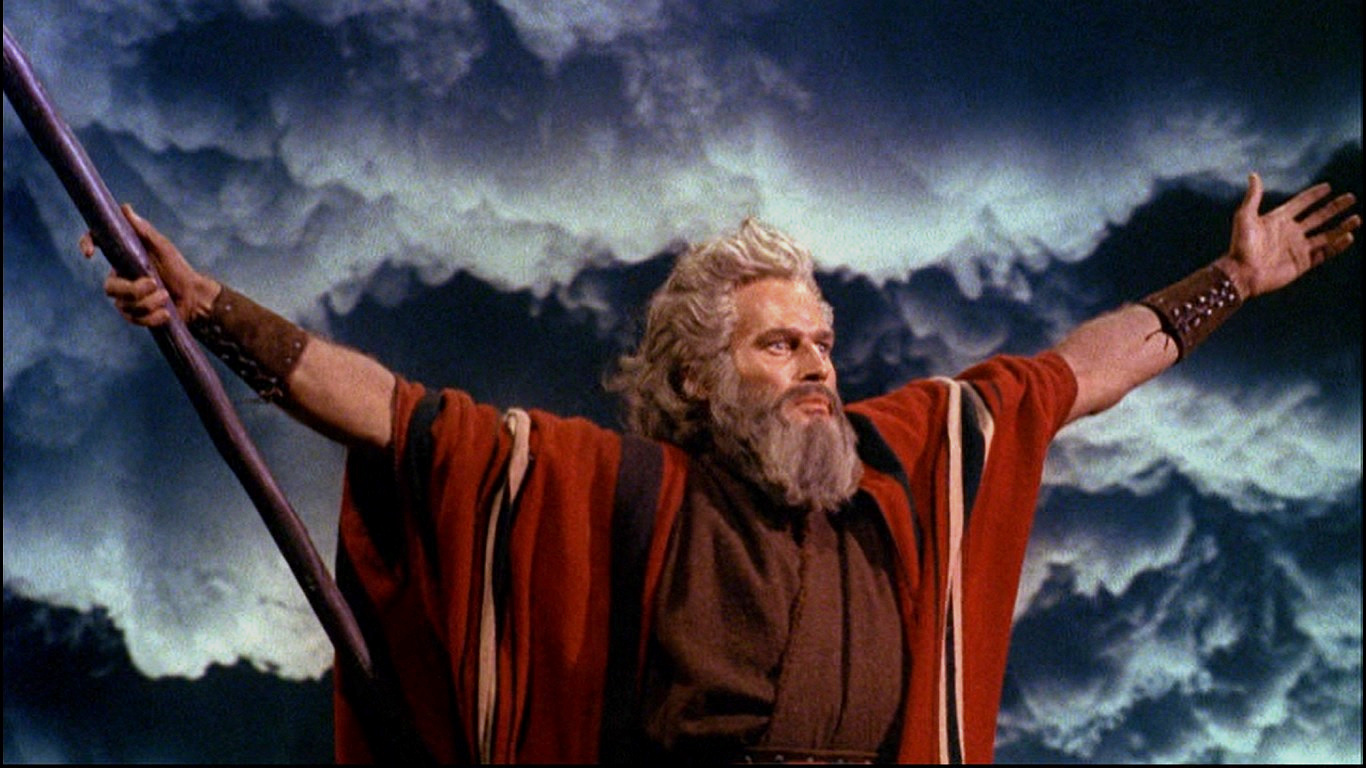
Rear projection, an in-camera effect, placed cloud effects behind Charlton Heston

The "blue screen" technique was used for this composite shot

The special photographic effects in The Ten Commandments were created by John P. Fulton, A.S.C. (who received an Oscar for his effects in the film), head of the special effects department at Paramount Pictures, assisted by Paul Lerpae, A.S.C. in optical photography (blue screen "travelling matte" composites) and Farciot Edouart, A.S.C., in process photography (rear projection effects). Fulton's effects included the building of Sethi's treasure city, the Burning Bush, the fiery hail from a cloudless sky, the Angel of Death, the composites of the Exodus, the Pillar of Fire, the giving of the Ten Commandments, and the tour de force, the parting of the Red Sea.

In his autobiography, DeMille wrote about the making of some of the film's special effects. He said he wanted to depict the Burning Bush the way it is described in the Bible, "burning but not consumed." (Note: In the King James Version, it says, "And the angel of the Lord appeared unto him in a flame of fire out of the midst of a bush: and he looked, and, behold, the bush burned with fire, and the bush was not consumed" (Exodus 3:2).) His secretary Doris Turner bought him a fireplace-shaped clock "with wavy light from a hidden source playing over small artificial logs," and DeMille showed the clock to Fulton, who managed to recreate the effect on the screen. For God's voice in the Burning Bush, DeMille turned to an ancient Jewish legend in the Midrash Rabbah, which said that God spoke to Moses with the voice of Amram, Moses' father, so he would not be frightened. Charlton Heston's voice was slightly slowed and deepened. DeMille's depiction of the Angel of Death was based on a sketch made by another of his secretaries, Lynn Hayne. One night, Hayne was looking out a window and saw a strange cloud that spread across the sky and had "fingers" pointing down toward the horizon; she drew it and sent it to DeMille the following day.

The cloud effects in the Red Sea sequence were formed with white smoke filmed against a translucent sky backing, and colors were added optically. (Note: This was an alternative to injecting poster paints into a glass tank containing a salt water inversion layer, a technique ILM used for Raiders of the Lost Ark and Poltergeist.) Portraits of Charlton Heston as Moses and three women in front of clouds were photographed by Wallace Kelly, A.S.C. in Farciot Edouart's process (rear projection) department. DeMille used these scenes to break up the montage.

DeMille was reluctant to discuss the technical details of the optical tricks used in the parting and crossing of the Red Sea. The parting of the Red Sea was considered the most difficult special effect ever performed up to that time. It took eight months of VistaVision filming, cost $1 million, and combined footage shot in Egypt at the Red Sea and Abu Rawash with footage shot in Hollywood at Paramount. Paramount built a huge water tank split by a U-shaped trough, into which approximately 360,000 gallons of water were released from the sides. To achieve the effect of the parting of the waters, the footage of the water pouring over the trough was printed in reverse. The sideways filming of the turbulent backwash of a large waterfall (also built on the Paramount backlot) was used to create the effect of the walls of the parted sea. The shots of the parting and the closing of the Red Sea required a maximum of 12 film negatives that were combined in Paul Lerpae's optical printer using the split screen, rotoscope and blue screen techniques. Matte paintings of rocks by Jan Domela concealed the matte lines between the location footage and the studio's water effects. The parting of the Red Sea is considered by many to be one of the greatest special effects of all time.

Paramount borrowed several Disney animators, including Joshua Meador, for the Pillar of Fire and the Finger of God sequences. The swirling sparks that emerge when the fire appears and disappears were created by superimposing slow-motion footage of burning magnesium. The Pillar of Fire contains nine shades of color, and three distinct drawings were animated for each frame of the writing of the Ten Commandments. The voice of God in the tablet-giving scene was provided by a voice actor with a deep bass voice, Jesse Delos Jewkes, who was a member of the Mormon Tabernacle Choir. Additionally, Jewkes' voice was enhanced by the use of the vox humana stop of the Salt Lake Tabernacle organ. DeMille, who was good friends with LDS church president David O. McKay, asked for and received permission to record the organ from McKay.

=== Editing ===
The Ten Commandments was edited by Academy Award-winning film editor Anne Bauchens, who had cut every DeMille film since We Can't Have Everything in 1918, including the original silent version. She described DeMille as "a man whose judgment you respect, who knows what he wants, who has temperament and fire but is courteous and who can tell a story better than anyone else." In his autobiography, DeMille said Bauchens was the best film editor he knew. During the editing process, Bauchens saw the film 106 times on a moviola and on the screen. After several months of viewing the film in Paramount's projection room, DeMille and Bauchens cut the film from 1,000,000 feet to 19,710 feet.

=== Music ===
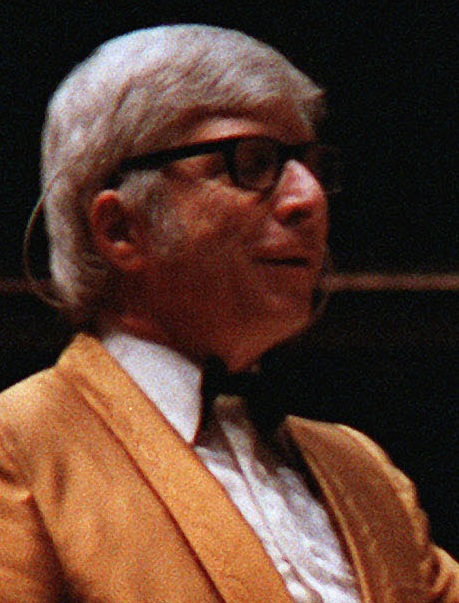
Elmer Bernstein in 1981

The score for The Ten Commandments was composed and conducted by Elmer Bernstein. Initially, DeMille hired Bernstein, then a relatively unknown film composer, to write and record only the diegetic music required for the film's dance sequences and other onscreen musical passages, with the intention of employing frequent collaborator Victor Young to write the score proper. However, Young turned down the assignment due to his own failing health, causing DeMille to hire Bernstein to write the underscore as well. In his autobiography, DeMille described Bernstein as "that unusually gifted young composer whose mind meshed so well with mine".

In total, Bernstein composed 2½ hours of music for the film, writing for a full symphony orchestra augmented with various ethnic and unusual instruments such as the shofar, the tiple, and the theremin. The score is written in a highly Romantic style, featuring unique musical leitmotifs for the film's characters (God, Moses, Rameses, Nefretiri, Dathan, Sephora, Lilia, Joshua, et al.) used in a manner inspired, at DeMille's direction, by the opera scores of Richard Wagner. Bernstein recorded both the diegetic music and the score at the Paramount Studios Recording Stage in sessions spread from April 1955 to August 1956. The diegetic music includes "Drinking Song - Bacchanal", with lyrics by Bernstein; "Song for Jethro's Daughters" and "Lilia's Song", with lyrics by Henry Wilcoxon; and "Chant of Priests and Priestesses", "The Shrine of the River Gods", and "Song of Joseph", with lyrics by Henry Noerdlinger.

A double-LP monaural soundtrack album was released in 1957 by Dot Records, using excerpts from the original film recordings. A stereo version of the 1957 album was released in 1960 containing new recordings conducted by Bernstein, as the original film recordings, while recorded in three-channel stereo, were not properly balanced for an LP stereo release, as the intent at the time of recording had been to mix the film masters to mono for the film soundtrack itself; this recording was later issued on CD by MCA Classics in 1989. For the film's tenth anniversary, United Artists Records released a second stereo re-recording in 1966, also conducted by Bernstein and employing different orchestral arrangements unique to this release.

For the film's 60th anniversary in 2016, Intrada Records released a six-CD album of the score. The Intrada release contains the complete 2½ hour score as originally recorded by Bernstein, with much of it remixed in true stereo for the first time. In addition, the 2016 release contains all the diegetic music recorded for the film, the original 1957 Dot album (in mono), the 1960 Dot album (in stereo), and the 1966 United Artists album, as well as a 12-minute recording of Bernstein auditioning his thematic ideas for DeMille on the piano. The box set won the IFMCA Award for Best New Archival Release – Re-Release or Re-Recording of an Existing Score.

== Release ==
Cecil B. DeMille promoted the film by placing Ten Commandment monuments as a publicity stunt for the film in cities across the United States. DeMille and Paramount executives attended the film's sneak preview, which took place at the Centre Theater in Salt Lake City, Utah, in August 1956. The print shown at the preview ran 3 hours and 49 minutes (10 minutes longer than the final cut).

The Ten Commandments premiered at New York City's Criterion Theatre on November 8, 1956. Described as "one of the most tumultuous film openings in years", the event was covered on television and radio by Dave Garroway's Today and Tex McCrary and Jinx Falkenberg's show. Among the cast and crew members (and their relatives) who attended the premiere were Cecil B. DeMille and his eldest child, Cecilia DeMille Harper; Charlton Heston and his wife, Lydia Clarke; Yul Brynner; Anne Baxter; Edward G. Robinson; Yvonne De Carlo and her husband, Bob Morgan; Martha Scott and her husband, Mel Powell, and son, Carleton Alsop; and Olive Deering. The list of other actors and entertainment personalities who went to the New York opening included William Holden, Brenda Marshall, John Wayne, Pilar Pallete, Tony Curtis, Janet Leigh, William Boyd, Katherine Cornell, Marlene Dietrich, John Forsythe, Arlene Francis, Celeste Holm, Bob Hope, Dorothy Kilgallen, Bert Lahr, Ed Sullivan, and Sophie Tucker.

The New York premiere

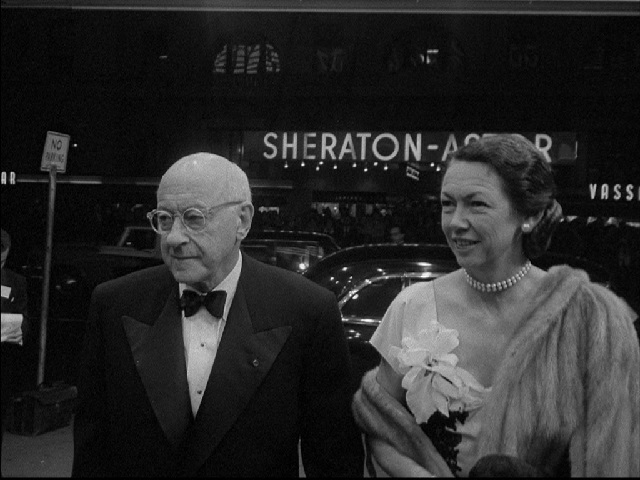
Cecil B. DeMille and Cecilia DeMille Harper, his daughter

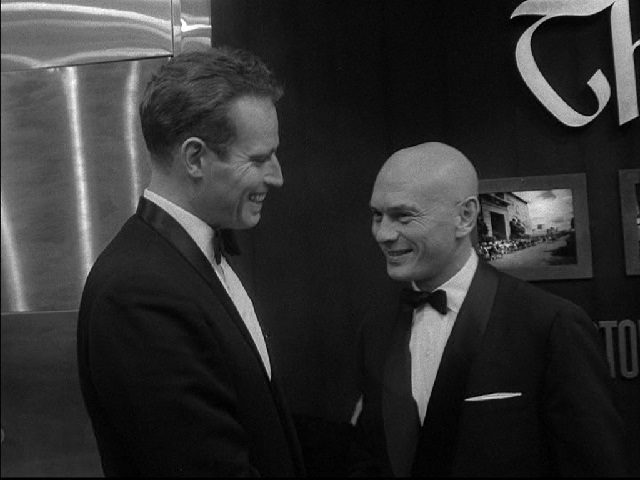
Charlton Heston and Yul Brynner

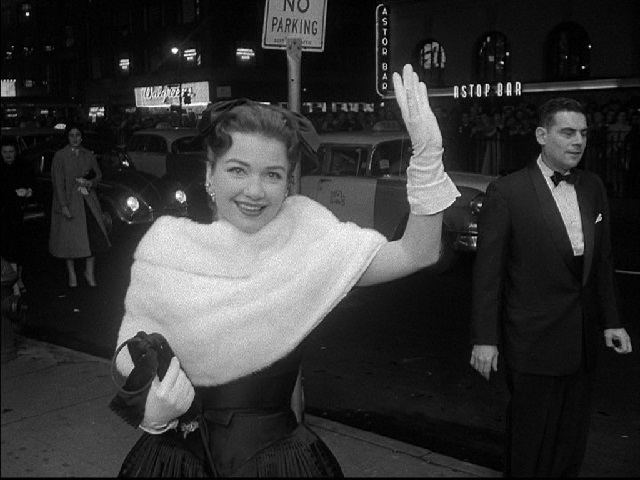
Anne Baxter

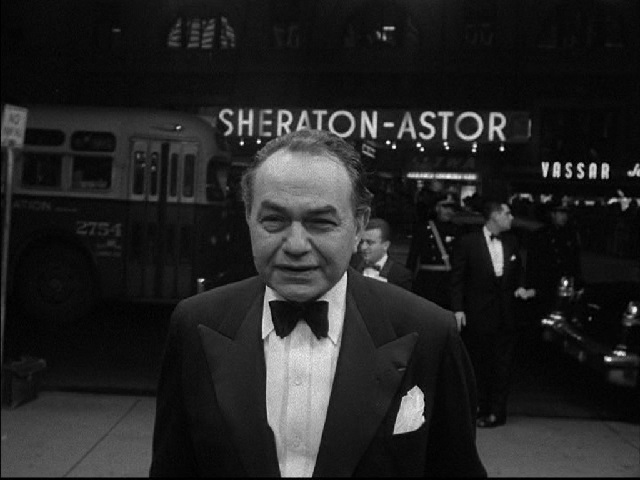
Edward G. Robinson

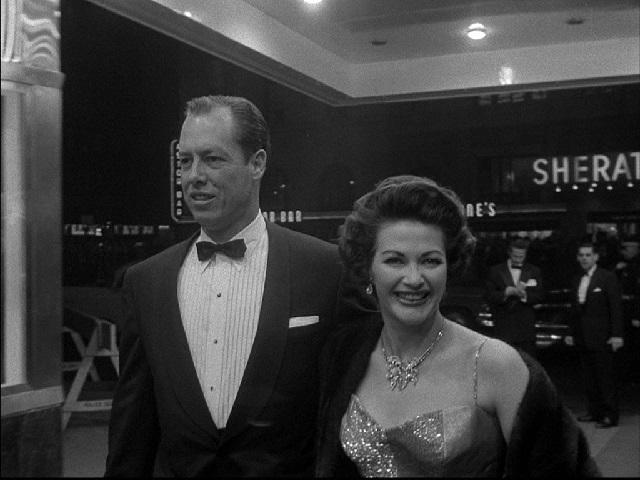
Yvonne De Carlo and Bob Morgan, her husband

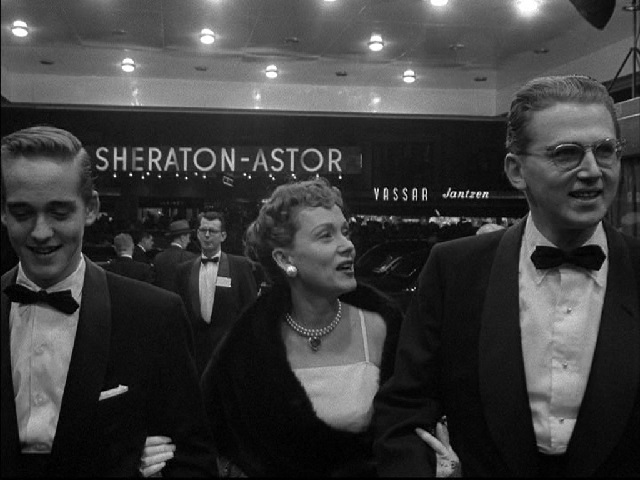
Martha Scott and her husband, Mel Powell, and her son, Carleton Alsop

The film had its Hollywood premiere at the Stanley Warner Beverly Hills Theatre on November 14, 1956. DeMille, Heston, Brynner, Baxter, and De Carlo also attended this opening, which included televised interviews with the stars. Other celebrities who saw the film at its West Coast debut included DeMille's daughter Katherine DeMille, Julia Faye, Clark Gable, Kay Williams, Laraine Day, Leo Durocher, Art Linkletter, Jack La Rue, Vera Ellen, Eddie Albert, Jon Hall, Tom Tryon, Alfred Hitchcock, Danny Kaye, Jimmy Durante, Jeanette MacDonald, Gene Raymond, Conrad Hilton, Ann Miller, Margaret O'Brien, Eddie Fisher, Debbie Reynolds, Frances Langford, Ann Blyth, and Red Skelton.

It played on a roadshow basis with reserved seating until mid-1958, when it finally entered general release.

The Ten Commandments was re-released in 1966 and 1972, and one more time in 1989. The 1972 and 1989 re-issues included 70mm and 35mm prints that reframed the picture's aspect ratio to 2.20:1 and 2.39:1, respectively, cropping the top and bottom of the picture's original 1.85:1 aspect ratio. The Ten Commandments was released on DVD on March 30, 1999; March 9, 2004, as a Special Collector's Edition; and March 29, 2011, as a Special edition and Standard edition. The Ten Commandments received a 4K UHD Blu-ray release on March 30, 2021.

== Reception ==
The 10-minute original theatrical trailer presented by DeMille

=== Box office ===
The Ten Commandments was the highest-grossing film of 1956, and the second most successful film of the decade. By April 1957, the film had earned an unprecedented $10 million from engagements at just eighty theaters, averaging about $1 million per week, with more than seven million people paying to watch it. It played for 70 weeks at the Criterion Theatre in New York, grossing $2.7 million. During its initial release, it earned theater rentals (the distributor's share of the box office gross) of $31.3 million in North America, and $23.9 million from the foreign markets, for a total of $55.2 million (equating to approximately $122.7 million in ticket sales). It was hugely profitable for its era, earning a net profit of $18,500,000, against a production budget of $13.27 million (the most a film had cost up to that point).

By the time of its withdrawal from distribution at the end of 1960, The Ten Commandments had overtaken Gone with the Wind at the box office in the North American territory, and mounted a serious challenge in the global market—the worldwide takings for Gone with the Wind were reported to stand at $59 million at the time. Gone with the Wind would be re-released the following year as part of the American Civil War Centennial, and re-asserted its supremacy at the box office by reclaiming the US record. Also at this time, Ben-Hur—another biblical epic starring Charlton Heston, released at the end of 1959—would go on to eclipse The Ten Commandments at the box office. A 1966 re-issue earned $6 million, and further re-releases brought the total American theater rentals to $43 million, equivalent to gross ticket sales of $89 million at the box office. Globally, it ultimately collected $90,066,230 in revenues up to 1979.

It remains one of the most popular films ever made. Adjusted for inflation, it has earned a box office gross equivalent to $2 billion at 2011 prices, according to Guinness World Records; only Gone with the Wind (1939), Avatar (2009), Star Wars (1977), Titanic (1997), The Sound of Music (1965), and E.T. the Extra-Terrestrial (1982) have generated higher grosses in constant dollars. The Ten Commandments is estimated to have sold 262 million tickets at the worldwide box office.

=== Critical response ===
As Mr. DeMille presents it in this three-hour-and-thirty-nine-minute film, which is by far the largest and most expensive that he has ever made, it is a moving story of the spirit of freedom rising in a man, under the divine inspiration of his Maker. And, as such, it strikes a ringing note today.

— Bosley Crowther for The New York Times

The Ten Commandments received rave reviews after its test screening in October 1956. James Powers of The Hollywood Reporter declared the film to be "the summit of screen achievement. It is not just a great and powerful motion picture, although it is that; it is also a new human experience. If there were but one print of this Paramount picture, the place of its showing would be the focus of a world-wide pilgrimage." Philip K. Scheuer, reviewing for the Los Angeles Times, said the film served "almost as a religious experience as it is a theatrical one. C. B. remains, at 75, the ablest living director of spectacle in the grand manner. His production measures up to the best for which his admirers have hoped—and far from the worst that his detractors expected. That old-time religion has a new look." New York Daily News called it "an absorbing and exciting historical record, documented with excerpts from the Books of Exodus and Numbers of the Old Testament, the Psalms and from the works of such ancient historians as Josephus, Philo and Eusebius."

Variety described the "scenes of the greatness that was Egypt, and Hebrews by the thousands under the whip of the taskmasters" as "striking", and believed that the film "hits the peak of beauty with a sequence that is unelaborate, this being the Passover supper wherein Moses is shown with his family while the shadow of death falls on Egyptian first-borns". Bosley Crowther for The New York Times was also among those who lauded DeMille's work, acknowledging that "in its remarkable settings and décor, including an overwhelming facade of the Egyptian city from which the Exodus begins, and in the glowing Technicolor in which the picture is filmed—Mr. DeMille has worked photographic wonders".

The film's cast was also complimented. Variety called Charlton Heston an "adaptable performer" who, as Moses, reveals "inner glow as he is called by God to remove the chains of slavery that hold his people". Powers felt that Heston was "splendid, handsome, and princely (and human) in the scenes dealing with him as a young man, and majestic and terrible as his role demands it. He is the great Michelangelo conception of Moses, but rather as the inspiration for the sculptor might have been than as a derivation." Variety also considered Yul Brynner to be an "expert" as Rameses, too. Anne Baxter's performance as Nefretiri was criticized by Variety as leaning "close to old-school siren histrionics", but Crowther stated that it, along with Brynner's, is "unquestionably apt and complementary to a lusty and melodramatic romance". The performances of Yvonne De Carlo and John Derek were acclaimed by Crowther as "notably good". He also commended the film's "large cast of characters" as "very good, from Sir Cedric Hardwicke as a droll and urbane Pharaoh to Edward G. Robinson as a treacherous overlord".

There were some critics who gave the film mixed reviews and disapproved of the extrabiblical love story between Moses and Nefretiri. Time thought the film was "[s]omething roughly comparable to an eight-foot chorus girl—pretty well put together, but much too big and much too flashy." Newsweek commented, "Viewing his current three and a half hour work, [the public] may find a DeMille production a trying experience now and then, but a very educational one. They are bound to be, as their parents and grandparents were [by the 1923 version], impressed."

In November 1956, The Ten Commandments was named the "most popular entrant" for the Best Picture Oscar and Heston was considered a top contender for the Best Actor Oscar. In March 1957, the Academy's failure to nominate Heston was considered a great upset. In his Movie Guide, film critic Leonard Maltin gave the film four out of four stars and wrote, "Vivid storytelling at its best. […] Parting of the Red Sea, writing of the holy tablets are unforgettable highlights." The critic Camille Paglia has called The Ten Commandments one of the ten greatest films of all time. Rotten Tomatoes retrospectively collected 89 reviews, and reported that 82% of critics have given the film a positive review, with an average rating of 7.8/10. The site's critics consensus states: "Bombastic and occasionally silly, but extravagantly entertaining, Cecil B. DeMille's all-star spectacular is a muscular retelling of the great Bible story."

Film scholars have noted that historical epics often used accents to reinforce cultural and political distinctions between protagonists and antagonists. In the film, the Egyptians were portrayed with British accents, while Moses and the Israelites spoke American-influenced English to make the protagonists more relatable to audiences. Similar linguistic distinctions were later employed in Ben-Hur (1959), in which Jewish characters spoke with American accents while Romans were portrayed with upper-class British accents. Scholars have argued that, at the time, American accents in Hollywood historical epics were often associated with liberty and moral virtue.

=== Accolades ===
==== Competitive awards ====
Award	Category	Recipient(s)	Result
Academy Awards	Best Art Direction (Color)	Art directors: Hal Pereira, Walter H. Tyler, and Albert Nozaki; Set decorators: Samuel M. Comer and Ray Moyer	Nominated
Academy Awards	Best Cinematography (Color)	Loyal Griggs	Nominated
Academy Awards	Best Costume Design (Color)	Edith Head, Ralph Jester, John Jensen, Dorothy Jeakins, and Arnold Friberg	Nominated
Academy Awards	Best Film Editing	Anne Bauchens	Nominated
Academy Awards	Best Motion Picture	Cecil B. DeMille, producer	Nominated
Academy Awards	Best Sound Recording	Paramount Studio Sound Department and sound director Loren L. Ryder	Nominated
Academy Awards	Best Special Effects	John P. Fulton	Won
Boxoffice Blue Ribbon Award	Best Picture of the Month (January 1957)	Cecil B. DeMille	Won
California Federation of Women's Clubs Motion Picture Industry Awards	Best Actor	Charlton Heston	Won
California Federation of Women's Clubs Motion Picture Industry Awards	Best Director	Cecil B. DeMille	Nominated
California Federation of Women's Clubs Motion Picture Industry Awards	Best Picture	Paramount and Cecil B. DeMille	Won
Christian Herald Reader's Award	Best Picture of the Year (1957)	Cecil B. DeMille	Won
Film Daily Filmdom's Famous Five Award	4th Best Actor	Charlton Heston	Won
Film Daily Filmdom's Famous Five Award	5th Best Director	Cecil B. DeMille	Won
Film Daily Filmdom's Famous Five Award	5th Best Photographed Picture	Loyal Griggs	Won
Film Daily Filmdom's Famous Five Award	5th Best Screenplay	Aeneas MacKenzie, Jesse L. Lasky Jr., Jack Gariss, and Fredric M. Frank	Won (tied with Robert Anderson for Tea and Sympathy)
Foreign Language Press Film Critics Circle Award	Best Director	Cecil B. DeMille	Won
Fotograma de Plata Award	Best Foreign Actor	Charlton Heston	Won
Golden Globe Awards	Best Performance by an Actor in a Motion Picture – Drama	Charlton Heston	Nominated
Laurel Awards	Best Male Dramatic Performance	Charlton Heston	Won
Laurel Awards	5th Best Female Dramatic Performance	Anne Baxter	Won
Laurel Awards	3rd Best Female Supporting Performance	Yvonne De Carlo	Won
National Board of Review Awards	Best Actor	Yul Brynner (also for Anastasia and The King and I)	Won

==== Special awards ====
- American Jewish Congress Stephen S. Wise Medallion to DeMille for "the most inspiring film of the year". Charlton Heston, Yul Brynner, Edward G. Robinson, Sir Cedric Hardwicke, Nina Foch, and Martha Scott also received awards for their performances.
- California Federation of Women's Clubs Motion Picture Industry Special Award to Fraser Clarke Heston for his portrayal of the infant Moses, which "served as an inspiration by exemplifying the richness of the family unit."
- Christopher Awards to DeMille, associate producer Henry Wilcoxon, and screenwriters Aeneas MacKenzie, Jesse L. Lasky Jr., Jack Gariss, and Fredric M. Frank. They were honored "because of the picture's unique significance in relating eternal truths to modern problems".
- Fame Achievement Award to DeMille, "in recognition of a career of spectacular success in motion picture production, crowned with an historic landmark of the screen, The Ten Commandments".
- Foreign Language Press Film Critics Circle Special Award to DeMille for Best Picture, "on the basis of [the film's] expression of human ideals and aspirations". The circle represented 44 newspapers in 19 languages.
- General Federation of Women's Clubs Citation to DeMille for "the motion picture which had the best educational influence, The Ten Commandments".
- Los Angeles Examiner Award to DeMille for "his many outstanding motion pictures which have provided some of the world's greatest entertainment during the past 43 years, his undeviating championship of Americanism, his magnificent and ageless production of The Ten Commandments".
- Paul Revere Trophy to DeMille as the producer of The Ten Commandments. John B. Hynes, Mayor of Boston, presented the award.
- Photoplay Achievement Award to DeMille for "the creation of one of the screen's greatest emotional and religious experiences, The Ten Commandments".
- Stanley Warner Theatre, Beverly Hills Plaque to DeMille for "the record run of his production, The Ten Commandments, united enduring truth with great entertainment, 15 November 1956 to 6 October 1957".
- The Salvation Army's "Sally" Award to DeMille for "outstanding achievement in the visualization of the Holy Bible".
- Torah Award from the National Women's League of the United Synagogues of America, Pacific Southwest Branch, to DeMille for his "heroic conception" of The Ten Commandments and for "focusing attention on 'the moral law'".

==== Polls ====
- One of Film Daily's Ten Best Pictures of 1956.
- One of Photoplay's Ten Most Popular Motion Pictures of 1956.

The Ten Commandments was included in three lists of the American Film Institute's AFI 100 Years... series:

- Moses as the No. 43 Hero in 100 Heroes and Villains (2003).
- 79th Most Inspiring American Movie in 100 Cheers (2006).
- 10th Epic Movie in 10 Top 10 (2008).

== Popularity and legacy ==
For decades, a showing of The Ten Commandments was a popular fundraiser among revivalist Christian Churches, while the film was equally treasured by film buffs for DeMille's "cast of thousands" approach and the heroic acting.

In a 1970s interview, Anne Baxter stated, "It's on TV every Easter. I advise sitting down with a big box of chocolates, a jug of white wine, and a loaf of freshly baked bread. I do it that way and I still love this last gasp of Hollywood excessiveness." In 1976, Yvonne De Carlo remembered she agreed with DeMille when, while they were making the film, he told her that "a religious picture will last forever."

Film director Martin Scorsese said it was one of his favorite films, writing in 1978 that:

I like De Mille: his theatricality, his images. I've seen The Ten Commandments maybe forty or fifty times. Forget the story—you've got to—and concentrate on the special effects, and the texture, and the color. For example: The figure of God, killing the first-born child, is a green smoke; then on the terrace, while they're talking, a green dry ice just touches the heel of George Reeves or somebody, and he dies. Then there's the reel Red Sea, and the lamb's blood of the Passover. De Mille presented a fantasy, dream-like quality on film that was so real, if you saw his movies as a child, they stuck with you for life.

American heavy metal band Metallica got the idea for the lyrics of their tenth plague of Egypt-inspired 1984 song "Creeping Death", after watching the second half of the film. While watching the scene of the final plague, represented by a green fog appearing out of the moon and rolling across the ground, killing every Egyptian first-born child that got caught in it, bassist-at-the-time Cliff Burton remarked, "Whoa, that's like creeping death!", to which frontman and rhythm guitarist James Hetfield responded, "Whoa, man, write that down, sheer poetry!" The band liked the sound of "creeping death" and decided to write a song about the plagues, using the phrase as its title and also incorporating the famous "so let it be written, so let it be done" line into the song's chorus.

In 1999, film historian Katherine Orrison published her book Written in Stone: Making Cecil B. DeMille's Epic The Ten Commandments, which features recollections of several of the film's cast and crew members.

== Home media ==
The Ten Commandments has been released on DVD in the United States on four occasions. The first edition (Widescreen Collection) was released on March 30, 1999, as a two-disc set, The second edition (Special Collector's Edition) was released on March 9, 2004, as a two-disc set with audio commentary by Katherine Orrison, a 6-part documentary, the New York premiere newsreel, and several trailers. The third edition (50th Anniversary Collection) was released on March 21, 2006, as a three-disc set with the 1923 version and special features. The fourth edition (55th Anniversary Edition) was released on DVD again in a two-disc set on March 29, 2011, and for the first time on Blu-ray in a two-disc set and a six-disc limited edition gift set with the 1923 version and DVD copies. In 2012, the limited edition gift set won the Home Media Award for Best Packaging (Paramount Pictures and Johns Byrne). In March 2021, a UHD Blu-ray was released. Using the 2010 6K scans, Paramount spent over 150 hours on new color work and clean-up.

== Television broadcast ==
The Ten Commandments was first broadcast on the ABC network on February 18, 1973, and has aired annually on the network since then, with the exception of 1999, traditionally during the Passover and Easter holidays. Since 2006, the network has typically aired The Ten Commandments on the Saturday night prior to Easter, with the broadcast starting at 7:00 p.m. in the Eastern, Pacific and Hawaii Time Zones and 6:00 p.m. in the Central, Mountain and Alaska Time Zones. (Exceptions—all of which resulted in the film airing on the Saturday before Palm Sunday—occurred in 2020 when the film aired prior to Palm Sunday, which that year was April 4, due to the COVID-19 pandemic; in 2022, when the film aired on April 9, due to an NBA game telecast scheduled on the night before Easter the following week; 2023, when the film aired on April 1, due to an NHL game telecast scheduled on the night before Easter the following week; and in 2025, when the film aired on April 12, due to a scheduled NBA broadcast.) The film is one of only two pre-scheduled ABC Saturday Movies of the Week every year, the other being The Sound of Music.

Unlike many lengthy films of the day, which were usually broken up into separate airings over at least two nights, ABC elected to show The Ten Commandments in one night and has done so every year it has carried the film, with one exception; in 1997, ABC elected to split the movie in two and aired half of it in its normal Easter Sunday slot, which that year was March 30, with the second half airing on Monday, March 31 as counter-programming to the other networks' offerings, which included CBS's coverage of the NCAA Men's Basketball Championship Game.

The length of the film combined with the necessary advertisement breaks has caused its broadcast window to vary over the years; by 2023, ABC's total run time for The Ten Commandments stood at four hours and 44 minutes, just above one hour longer than its three-hour and 39-minute length. This requires the network to overrun into the 11:00 p.m./10:00 p.m. timeslot that belongs to the local affiliates, thus delaying their late local news and any other programming they may air in the overnight hours. Affiliates may also delay the film to the usual start of prime time at 8:00 p.m./7:00 p.m. to keep their schedules in line for early evening, at the cost of further delaying their local newscasts or forgoing them entirely.

In 2010, the film was broadcast in high definition for the first time, which allowed the television audience to see it in its original 1.66:1 VistaVision aspect ratio. It is also broadcast with its original Spanish language dub over the second audio program channel. In 2015, for the first time in several years, the network undertook a one-off airing of the film on Easter Sunday night, which fell on April 5.

All of ABC's telecasts omit Cecil B. DeMille's opening prologue and some musical elements (Overture, Entr'acte, and Exit Music) seen in the theatrical release.

In the Philippines, the film is traditionally aired every Holy Week (yearly except 2019) since it premiered on April 1, 2015, on GMA Network, either cut for time or in full, and dubbed in Filipino.

Ratings by year (since 2007)

Year	Airdate	Rating	Share	Rating/Share (18–49)	Viewers (millions)	Rank (timeslot)	Rank (night)
2007	April 7	TBA	7.87	TBA	TBA	TBA	TBA
2008	March 22	4.7	9	2.3/7	7.91	1	1
2009	April 11	4.2	8	1.7/6	6.81	1	1
2010	April 4	TBA	TBA	1.4/5	5.88	2	3
2011	April 23	TBA	TBA	1.6/5	7.05	1	1
2012	April 7	TBA	TBA	1.6/5	6.90	TBA	TBA
2013	March 30	TBA	TBA	1.2/4	5.90	2	2
2014	April 19	TBA	TBA	1.0/4	5.87	1	1
2015	April 5	TBA	TBA	1.4/5	6.80	TBA	TBA
2016	March 26	TBA	TBA	0.8/3	5.42	2	2
2017	April 15	TBA	TBA	0.8/3	5.18	1	1
2018	March 31	TBA	TBA	0.6/3	4.75	1	1
2019	April 20	TBA	TBA	0.6/3	4.90	1	1
2020	April 4	0.6	4	0.6/3	5.14	1	1
2021	April 3	0.47	–	0.47/4	4.07	2	2
2022	April 9	–	–	0.33/3	3.49	1	1
2023	April 1	–	–	0.27/0.32	3.06	2	1
2024	March 30	–	–	0.34	2.89	2	2
2025	April 12	TBA	TBA	0.18/3	2.63	1	1
2026	April 4	TBA	TBA	0.26/3	3.06	1	1

== See also ==
- List of films based on the Bible
- List of American films of 1956
- List of films featuring slavery
