= Karoon =

Karoon may refer to:

- Kārūn, a river in Iran
- Korah or Qārūn, Biblical figure who led a rebellion against Moses
