= Arthur Eustace Southon =

The Reverend Arthur Eustace Southon (16 February 1887 – 30 December 1964), usually known as A. E. Southon, was an English minister in the Methodist Church, and author. He was best known as the writer of On Eagle's Wings, one of the books used as the basis for the 1956 movie The Ten Commandments, one of the most commercially successful films ever released.

== Life and career ==
Southon was born in London, the son of Walter Southon and Alice Lansdell. In 1915 he became minister at the Methodist Church in Froyle, Hampshire, a post he left in 1919. He married Joyce Mossop around 1916. He is also believed to have worked for a while as a missionary in West Africa and China. He wrote at least 15 books, both fiction and non-fiction, including On Eagle's Wings, which was first published in 1937.

Southon died in Bristol on 30 December 1964, at the age of 77.

== Bibliography ==
Southon published a number of books, including:

- A Yellow Napoleon: A romance of West Africa (1923)
- The Whispering Bush: True tales of West Africa (1924)
- More Yarns on China (1924)
- Red Hands, and other tales of Africa and the East (1926)
- The God of Gold: A tale of the West African coast (1927)
- The Laughing Ghosts: Tales of adventure in West Africa (1928)
- The Fight for Life (1929)
- Khama, the Conqueror: A historical novel (1930)
- Ilesha, and beyond (1931)
- King of the World (1931)
- Gold Coast Methodism (1934)
- On Eagles' Wings (1937)
- This Evil Generation (1939)
- Ready-for-anything: The story of Edgar Bowden and the Bristol mission (1948)
- Stories of the Bible (1949)
