= Dathan =

Biblical figure

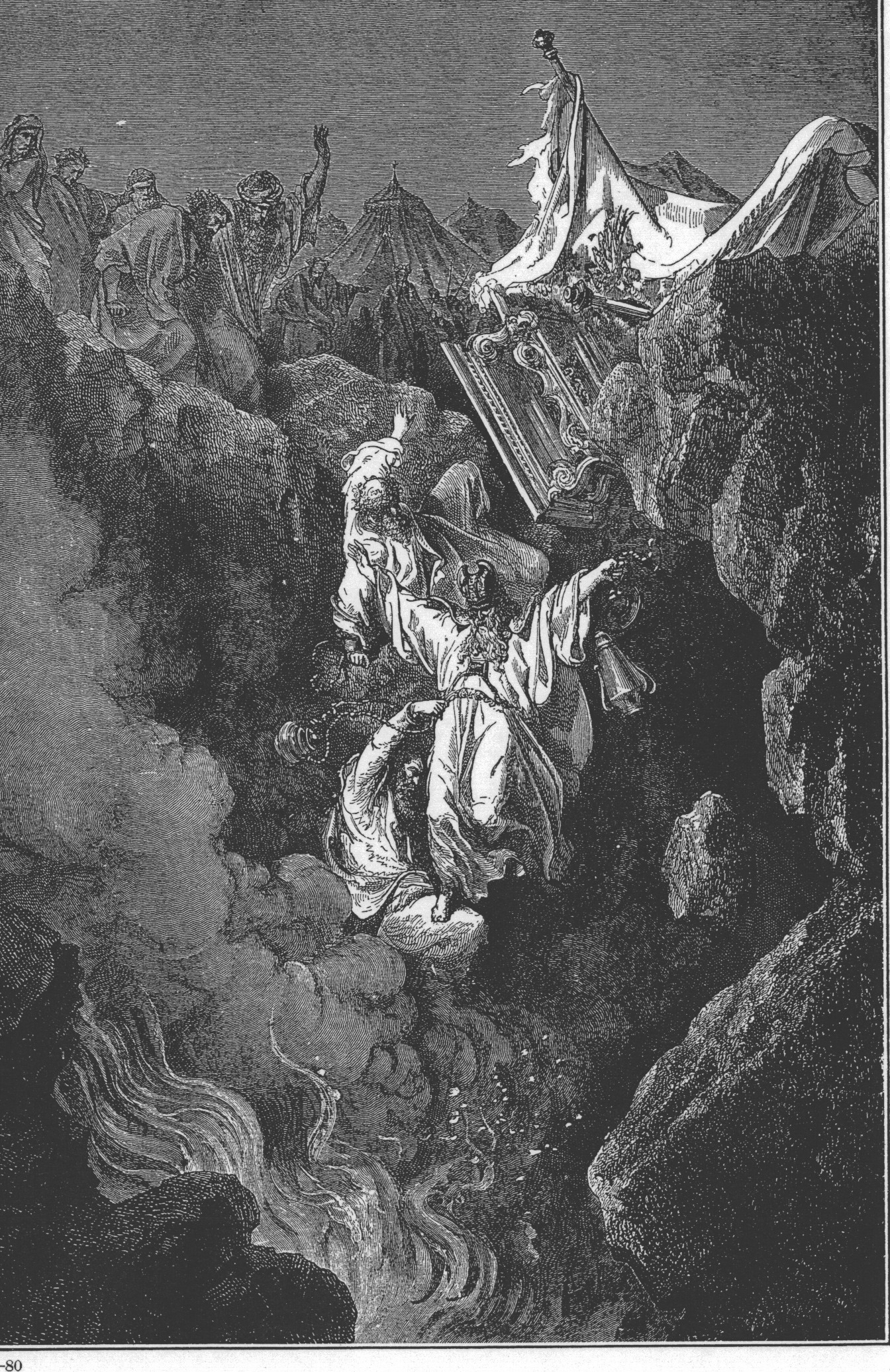
The Death of Korah, Dathan and Abiram, by Gustave Doré, 1865.

Dathan (Hebrew: דָּתָן Dāṯān) was an Israelite mentioned in the Old Testament as a participant of the Exodus.

He was a son of Eliab, the son of Pallu, the son of Reuben. Together with his brother Abiram, the Levite Korah and others, he rebelled against Moses and Aaron. The Book of Numbers relates that "the earth opened her mouth, and swallowed them up, and their houses." (Book of Numbers 16:31). Dathan is also mentioned in Psalm 106.

== In Rabbinic literature ==
Dathan, together with his brother Abiram, were among the quarrelsome and seditious personages in Egypt and in the wilderness who sought, on every occasion, to place difficulties in the way of Moses. Being identified with the two Israelites at strife who were the cause of Moses' flight from Egypt (Ex. ii. 13–15), the two were thus regarded as having interfered with him at the beginning of his career. Later, as punishment for their treachery, they became poor and were degraded in rank; yet they did not cease their hostility to Moses, and opposed his first endeavor to deliver Israel. It was Abiram and Dathan who were the immediate cause of the bitter reproaches made to Moses and Aaron recounted in Ex. v. 20, 21. When, despite this, the exodus from Egypt took place, Dathan and Abiram tried to induce the people at the Red Sea to return (Ex. xiv. 11, 12); and in the failure of this attempt, they made an effort, through disregard of Moses' commands, to incite the people against their leader—Ex. xvi. 20 being applied to them—until they thought they had a following sufficiently numerous to risk the great rebellion under Korah. On this occasion, also, Dathan and Abiram were conspicuous for their wickedness. Not only were they among Korah's chief supporters, but they were impertinent and insulting in their speech to Moses, who, in his modesty and love of peace, went to them himself in order to dissuade them from their pernicious designs (Sanh. 109b; 'Ab. Zarah, 5a; Ex. R. i.; Num. R. xviii. 4). L.G.

== Movie depiction ==
Dathan is depicted by modern popular culture in Cecil B. DeMille 's 1923 silent movie version, with Lawson Butt in the role. As the Moses story only takes up a portion of this film, Dathan's role is correspondingly smaller. However, throughout the golden calf sequence, he is shown madly obsessed with Miriam, frequently touching or smelling her hair. Later in the film, he manages to seduce her and, much to his horror, she has leprosy on her hands, causing him to withdraw from her and run away. He is last seen surrounded by throngs of people, who blame him for bringing them destruction "with thy gods of gold".

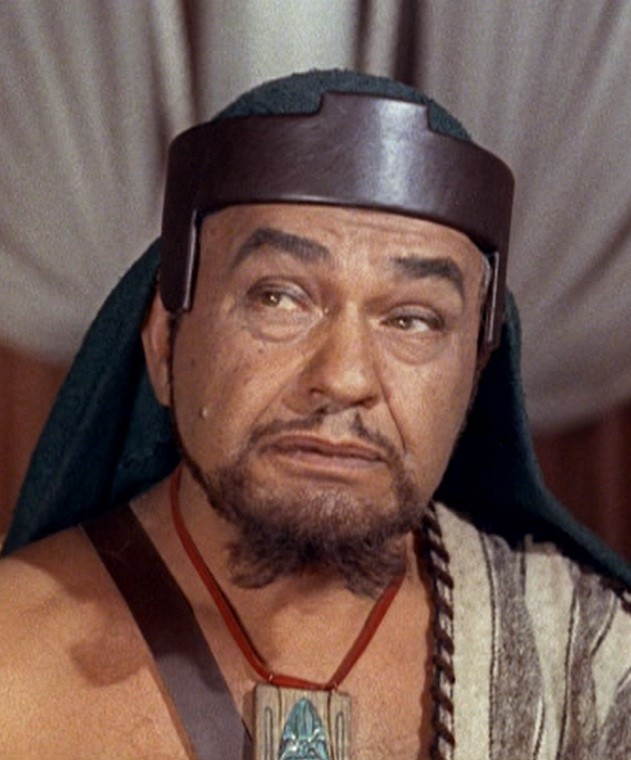
Dathan in The Ten Commandments, 1956

Dathan later appears in DeMille's epic remake The Ten Commandments (1956), portrayed by Edward G. Robinson. In the film, he acts as a major antagonist and is an Israelite who works as an overseer of the Hebrews and informant for the Egyptians, and later, after betraying Moses' Hebraic origin to Ramesses, he becomes Governor of Goshen, with his brother Abiram as his second. During the plagues, he repeatedly tries to dissuade the Israelites from listening to Moses. In spite of his loyalty and service to Pharaoh, he is expelled from Egypt after the Plague of the Firstborn and forced to join Moses and the other Israelites in their Exodus. After the Exodus, he encourages the Israelites to blame Moses when the Egyptians come after them at the Red Sea, and he leads the Israelites in their worship of the golden calf. He is one of those swallowed up in the earth when Moses (Charlton Heston) smashes the tablets of the Ten Commandments in a rage, after discovering the Israelites' idolatry.

Dathan also appears in the 2007 CGI animated version voiced by Canadian voice actor Lee Tockar. His role is sort of similar to his 1956 counterpart, only he is more of a dissenter for Moses when he comes to free the slaves, often expressing doubt and impatience towards Moses. He doesn’t get any better after the Hebrews get freed as even after witnessing God’s miracles, Dathan still thinks the Hebrews deserve better than the situation they are currently in. He, his brother and some of his followers are swallowed up into the Earth after they create the Golden Calf. In this adaptation, Dathan is given the appearance as a short, stubby, balding man.
