= Eliab =

Name list

Eliab, also spelled Eliaab, is a male name, held by three people in the Hebrew Bible, respectively the sons of Helon, Pallu, and, most significantly, Jesse.

== Eliab, son of Helon ==
Eliab, the son of Helon, was one of the leaders of the tribes of Israel and a prince of the house of Zebulun according to Numbers 1:9.

== Eliab, son of Pallu ==
Eliab was the son of Pallu and the father of Nemuel, Dathan, and Abiram, of the house of Reuben, according to Numbers 16:1 and Numbers 26:8-9.

== Eliab, son of Jesse ==
Eliab of Bethlehem, of the tribe of Judah, was the eldest son of Jesse (1 Samuel 16:6 and 1 Chronicles 2:13) and thus the eldest brother of King David. He was apparently tall and had fair features, and was the first potential king of Israel considered for anointing by the prophet Samuel after his disillusion with King Saul. His features resembled those Samuel had first seen in Saul, and so Samuel may have considered him "a fit successor" to Saul. However, God told Samuel that Eliab did not have the proper heart to be king of Israel:

Do not consider his appearance or his height ... the Lord looks at the heart.

Samuel went on to consider each of Eliab's brothers in turn. Some commentators have suggested that Eliab was rejected because of his temper, as he argued with David before David went to fight Goliath, accusing David of pride and insolence.

Eliab's daughter Abihail became the mother-in-law of King Rehoboam, according to 2 Chronicles.
