= Abiram =

Abiram, also spelled Abiron (Hebrew: אֲבִירָם "my father is exalted"), is the name of two people in the Old Testament.

- One was a member of the Tribe of Reuben, the son of Eliab, who, along with his brother Dathan, joined Korah in the conspiracy against Moses and Aaron. He and all the conspirators, with their families and possessions, were swallowed up by the ground.
- The second was the eldest son of Hiel (also spelled Chiel) the Bethelite, who perished prematurely in consequence of his father's undertaking to rebuild Jericho.

The name Abram is thought to be the same name, etymologically; the name is attested in a 24th-century Babylonian form.
