= Korah =

Biblical personage

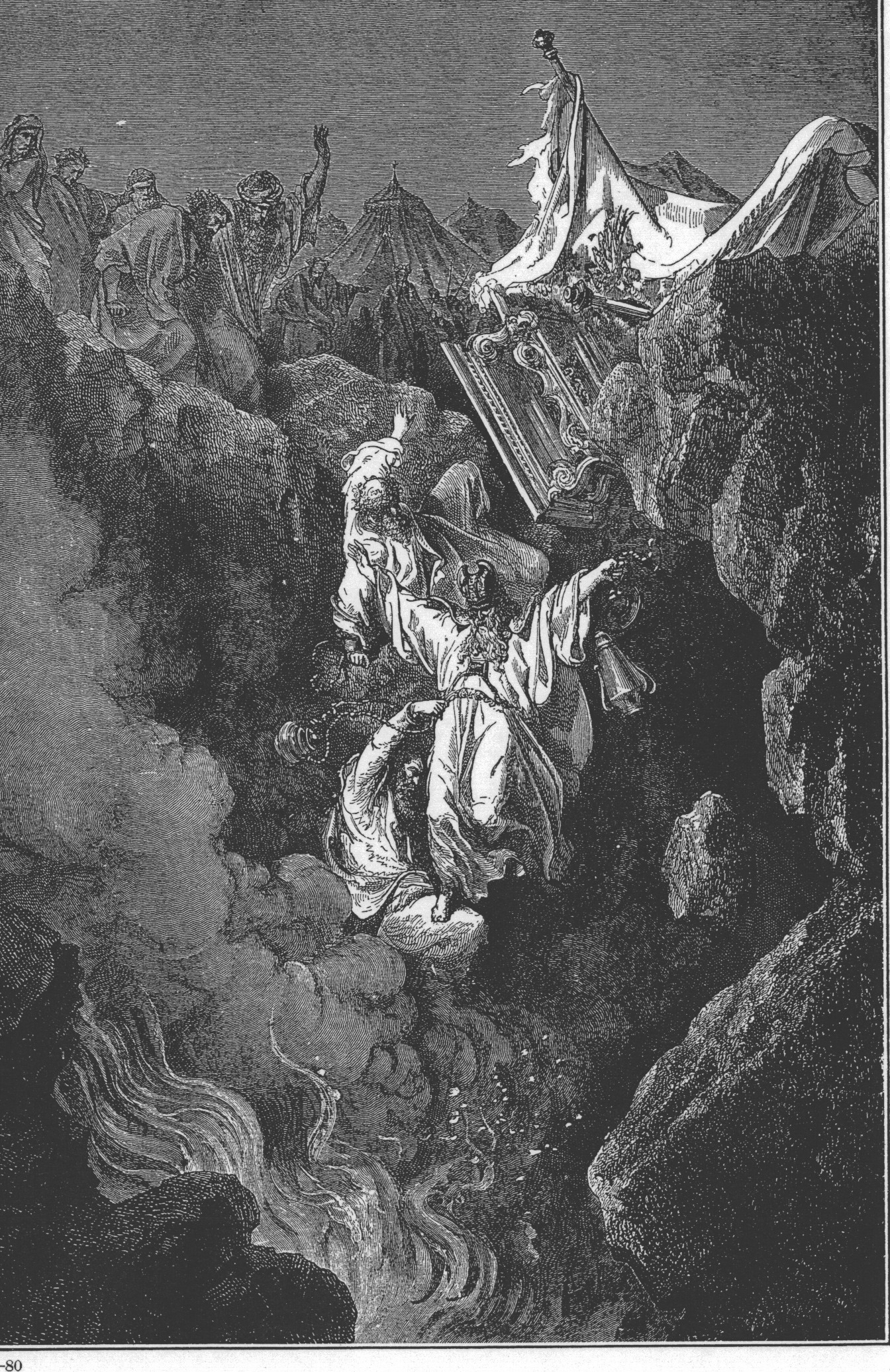
Death of Korah, Dathan and Abiram, Gustave Doré, 1865.

Korah (Hebrew: קֹרַח Qōraḥ), son of Izhar, is an individual who appears in the Biblical Book of Numbers of the Old Testament (Hebrew Bible), known for leading a rebellion against Moses. Some older English translations, as well as the Douay–Rheims Bible, spell the name Core, and many Eastern European translations have "Korak" or "Korey".

The name Korah is also used for at least one other individual in the Hebrew Bible: Korah (son of Esau).

== In the Torah ==
=== Genealogy ===
Exodus 6:21 cites Korah as being the son of Izhar, son of Kehath, son of Levi. Exodus 6:24 lists his three sons. Korah's brothers through Izhar were Nepheg and Zichri. Exodus 6:18 connects this Korah with Hebron, Uzziel, and Amram, who were his father's brothers (Izhar son of Kohath). 1 Chronicles 6:2,18,38, and 23:12, repeat this genealogy; however, this reference could have been inspired by the Exodus genealogies.

Numbers 16:1 traces this lineage back further to Levi, son of the patriarch Israel. According to Numbers 16:1, his lineage runs: "Korah, the son of Izhar, the son of Kehath, the son of Levi", making him the great-grandson of the patriarch Levi and the first cousin of Moses and Aaron.

=== Rebellion ===
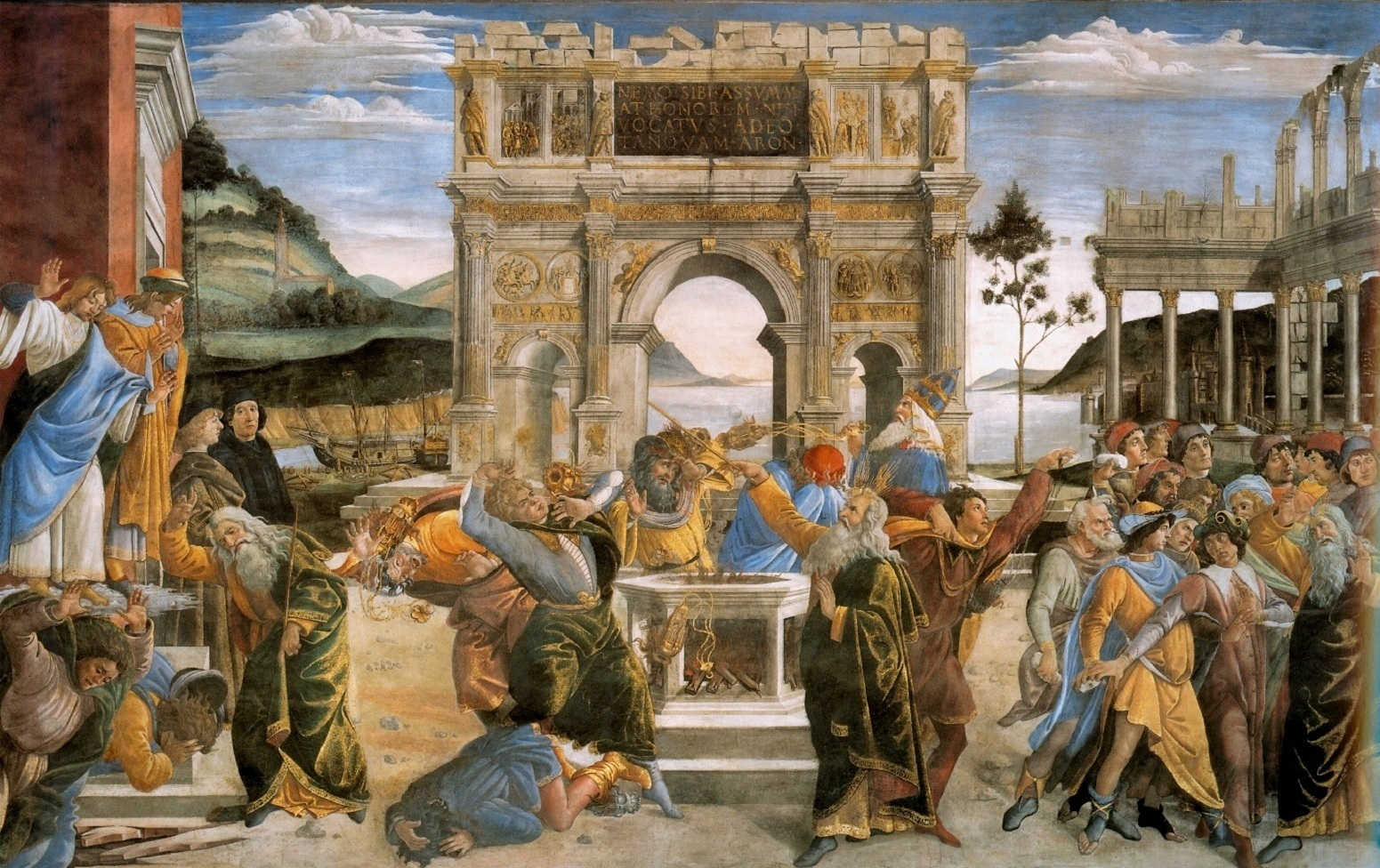
Punishment of the Sons of Korah. Fresco by Sandro Botticelli in the Sistine Chapel, 1480–82.

Numbers 16:1–40 indicates that Korah rebelled against Moses along with Dathan and Abiram and 250 co-conspirators. The 250 co-conspirators were punished for their rebellion when they offered incense to God in fire pans, and heavenly fire consumed all 250 of them. Korah from the tribe of Levi and his allies Dathan and Abiram from the tribe of Reuben were also punished when God caused the ground to split open beneath their feet, swallowing them alive into Sheol, their families, anyone associated with Korah, and all their possessions, with the earth closing over them.

Furthermore, the Israelites who did not like what had happened to Korah, Dathan and Abiram (and their families) objected to Moses and Aaron, and God then commanded Moses to depart from the multitude that he may consume them. God then uses a plague, which smites 14,700 people before it is stopped, as punishment for objecting to Korah's destruction (Numbers 16:41ff.)

In another mention of the earth opening up, it presents the male Levite lineage of Korah as not dying out "Notwithstanding, the sons of Korah died not" (Numbers 26:11). The ultimate fate of Korah is ambiguous, and he may have been swallowed by the earth alongside the families of Dathan and Abiram, consumed by divine fire with the two hundred and fifty people, a mix of both judgements, or in another way as he is never included alongside others in retellings in Deuteronomy 11:6 and Psalm 106:16–18, with this being debated in the Talmud.

== In rabbinical literature ==
The rabbis of the Talmudic era explained the name "Korah" as meaning "baldness." It was given to Korah on account of the gap or blank which he made in Israel by his revolt. Korah is represented as the possessor of extraordinary wealth, having discovered one of the treasures that Joseph had hidden in Egypt. The keys of Korah's treasuries alone formed a load for 300 mules. He and Haman were the two richest men in the world, and both died on account of their greed, and because their riches were not the gift of Heaven. On the other hand, Korah is represented as a wise man, chief of his family and as one of the Kohathites who carried the Ark of the Covenant on their shoulders.

=== Cause of revolt ===
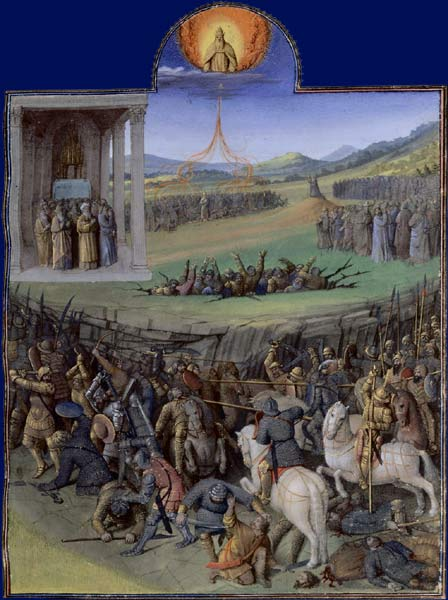
Battle of the Hebrews against the Canaanites and Punishment of Korah, miniature from Antiquities of the Jews

According to the Rabbis, the main cause of Korah's revolt was the nomination of Elizaphan, son of Uzziel, as prince over the Kohathites, Korah argues thus: "Kohath had four sons. The two sons of Amram, Kohath's eldest son, took for themselves the kingdom and the priesthood. Now, as I am the son of Kohath's second son, I should be made prince over the Kohathites; however, Moses gave that office to Elizaphan, the son of Kohath's youngest son".

Korah asked Moses the following questions: "Does a tallit made entirely of tekhelet need fringes?" To Moses' affirmative answer, Korah objected: "The blue color of the ṭallit does not make it ritually correct, yet according to your statement four blue threads do so". "Does a house filled with the books of the Law need a mezuzah?" Moses replied that it did; whereupon Korah said: "The presence of the whole Torah, which contains 175 chapters, does not make a house fit for habitation, yet you say that one chapter of it does so. It is not from God that you have received these commandments; you have invented them yourself." He then assembled 250 men, chiefs of the Sanhedrin, and, having clad them in tallitot of blue wool, but without fringes, prepared for them a banquet. Aaron's sons came for the priestly share, but Korah and his people refused to give the prescribed portions to them, saying that it was not God but Moses who commanded those things. Moses, having been informed of these proceedings, went to the house of Korah to effect a reconciliation, but the latter and his 250 followers rose up against him.

Korah also consulted his wife, who encouraged him in the revolt, saying, "See what Moses has done. He has proclaimed himself king; he has made his brother high priest, and his brother's sons priests; moreover, he has made you shave all your hair in order to disfigure you." Korah answered: "But he has done the same to his own sons." His wife replied: "Moses hated you so much that he was ready to do evil to his own children, provided the same evil would overtake you".

Modern Jewish Reform and secular interpretations of the Korah revolt supply new causes for the revolt to reflect new agendas and concerns of the authors.

=== Korah's parable ===
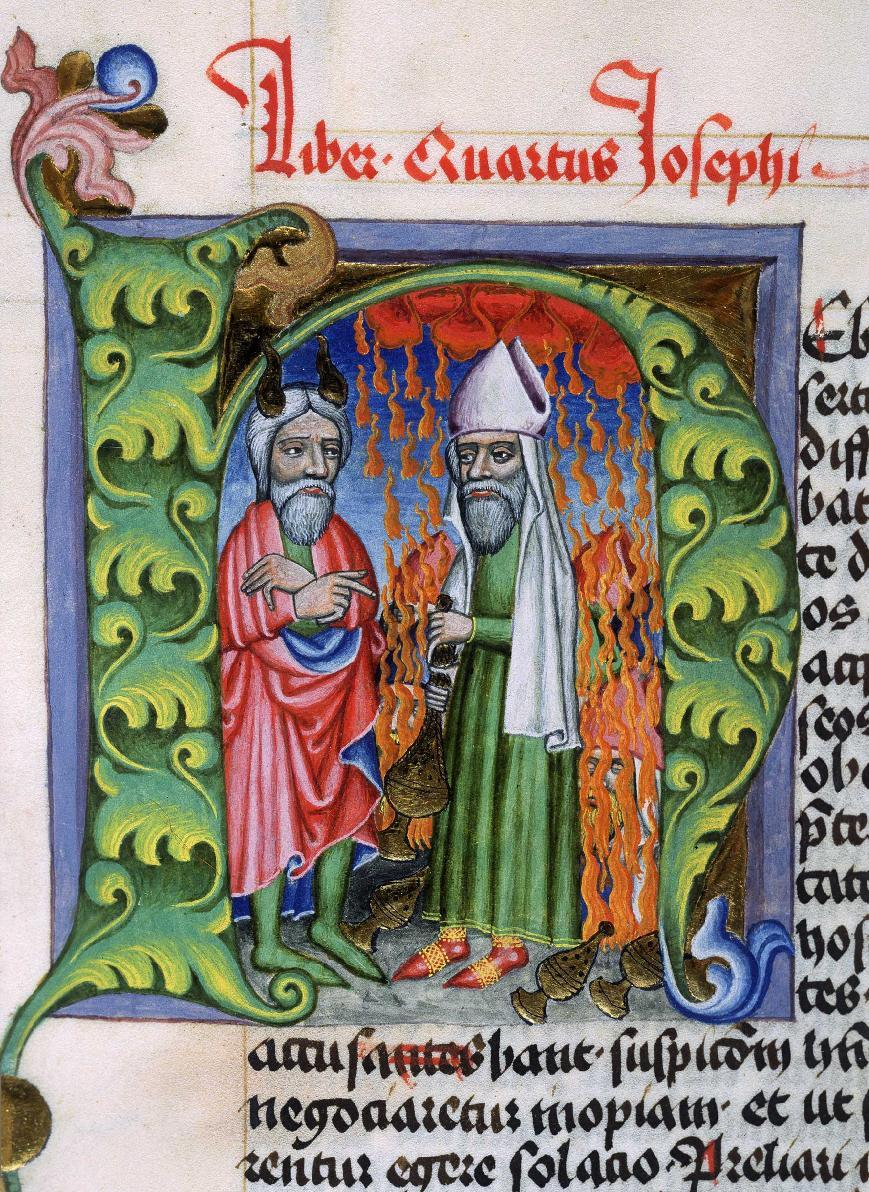
Moses and Korah, 1466 manuscript miniature, National Library of Poland.

Korah incited all the people against Moses, arguing that it was impossible to endure the laws Moses had instituted. He told them the following parable: "A widow, the mother of two young daughters, had a field. When she came to plow it, Moses told her not to plow it with an ox and an ass together; when she came to sow it, Moses told her not to sow it with mingled seeds. At the time of harvest she had to leave unreaped the parts of the field prescribed by the Law, while from the harvested grain she had to give the priest the share due to him. The woman sold the field and, with the proceeds, bought two sheep. But the first-born of these she was obliged to give to Aaron the priest; and at the time of shearing, he required the first of the fleece also. The widow said: 'I cannot bear this man's demands any longer. It will be better for me to slaughter the sheep and eat them.' But Aaron came for the shoulder, the two cheeks, and the maw. The widow then vehemently cried out: 'If you persist in your demand, I declare them devoted to the Lord.' Aaron replied: 'In that case the whole belongs to me', whereupon he took away the meat, leaving the widow and her two daughters wholly unprovided for".

The question of how it was possible for a wise man like Korah to be so imprudent as to rebel is explained by the fact that he was deceived through his own prophetic ability. He had foreseen that the prophet Samuel would be his descendant, and therefore concluded that he himself would escape punishment. But he was mistaken; for, while his sons escaped, he perished.

=== Destruction of Korah ===
At the time of Korah's engulfment, the earth became like a funnel, and everything that belonged to him, even linen that was at the launderer's and needles that had been borrowed by persons living at a distance from Korah, rolled till it fell into the chasm. According to the Rabbis, Korah himself underwent the double punishment of being burned and buried alive. He and his followers continued to sink until Hannah prayed for them; and through her prayer, the Rabbis declare, Korah will ascend to paradise. Rabbah bar bar Hana narrates that while he was traveling in the desert, an Arab showed him the place of Korah's engulfment. There was at the spot a slit in the ground into which he introduced some wool soaked in water. The wool became parched. On placing his ear to the slit, he heard voices cry: "Moses and his Torah are true; and we are liars".

The paradoxical cry: The Midrash presents a poignant irony in the words Korah repeats. While he continues to rebel from the depths, the words that escape his lips are a confession of truth: "Moses and his Torah are true." This suggests that even in his defiant state, the divine judgment has forced a recognition of the truth that he refused to acknowledge in life. A continuing act of rebellion: This eternal and unrepentant confession illustrates that Korah's punishment is directly linked to his sin. He eternally reenacts his rebellion by both defying and being forced to acknowledge the truth of Moses and the Torah. His punishment is not a simple destruction but a persistent cycle of agony and defiance that demonstrates the futility of his earlier challenge.

The Mishnah details a dispute between Rabbi Akiva and Rabbi Eliezer regarding several groups who committed severe sins. In the case of Korah, Rabbi Akiva cites the biblical passage that describes their demise: "And the earth closed upon them...and they perished from among the congregation" (Numbers 16:33). He interprets the phrase "the earth closed upon them" to mean that they lost their portion in this world. He interprets the phrase, "and they perished from among the congregation," to mean that they lost their portion in the World to Come (Olam Ha-Ba). According to this view, Korah and his followers are not destined to return from their final punishment. Rabbi Eliezer disagrees with Rabbi Akiva's interpretation, arguing for the possibility of redemption. He cites a verse from the prophet Samuel: "The Lord kills and makes alive: He brings down to Sheol, and brings up" (I Samuel 2:6). For Rabbi Eliezer, this verse demonstrates that God has the power to bring up even those who were sent down to Sheol, indicating that Korah's company could eventually be brought back up. A Midrashic account describes how Korah's rebellion continues in the afterlife. According to tradition, his punishment is not a final reckoning that ends his will to rebel. Instead, he continues to defiantly repeat the words he spoke during his rebellion ("Moses and Aaron are no better than us") from the depths of the earth. Rebelling against authority: For the rabbis, Korah became the ultimate example of a rebel who challenged the God-given authority of Moses. They viewed Korah's story as a cautionary tale for those who would challenge rabbinic teachings in their own time. Perpetual rebellion: In the rabbinic imagination, Korah is the ultimate arch-rebel, and his punishment reflects this. The Midrash explains that his mouth was the primary tool of his rebellion, so his punishment was being swallowed by the "mouth" of the earth.A contrast with Korah's sons: The Mishnah's discussion highlights the consequences of unrepentant rebellion by contrasting Korah's fate with that of his sons. The Midrash contrasts Korah's unrelenting rebellion with the behavior of his sons. The Torah explicitly states that the sons of Korah did not die with their father (Numbers 26:11) The sons of Korah repented before the earth swallowed their father, and because of this, they were spared. Their descendants later became Temple singers (I Chronicles 6:18). Their story became a symbol of redemption through repentance, while Korah's became the symbol of eternal damnation.

== Islamic tradition ==
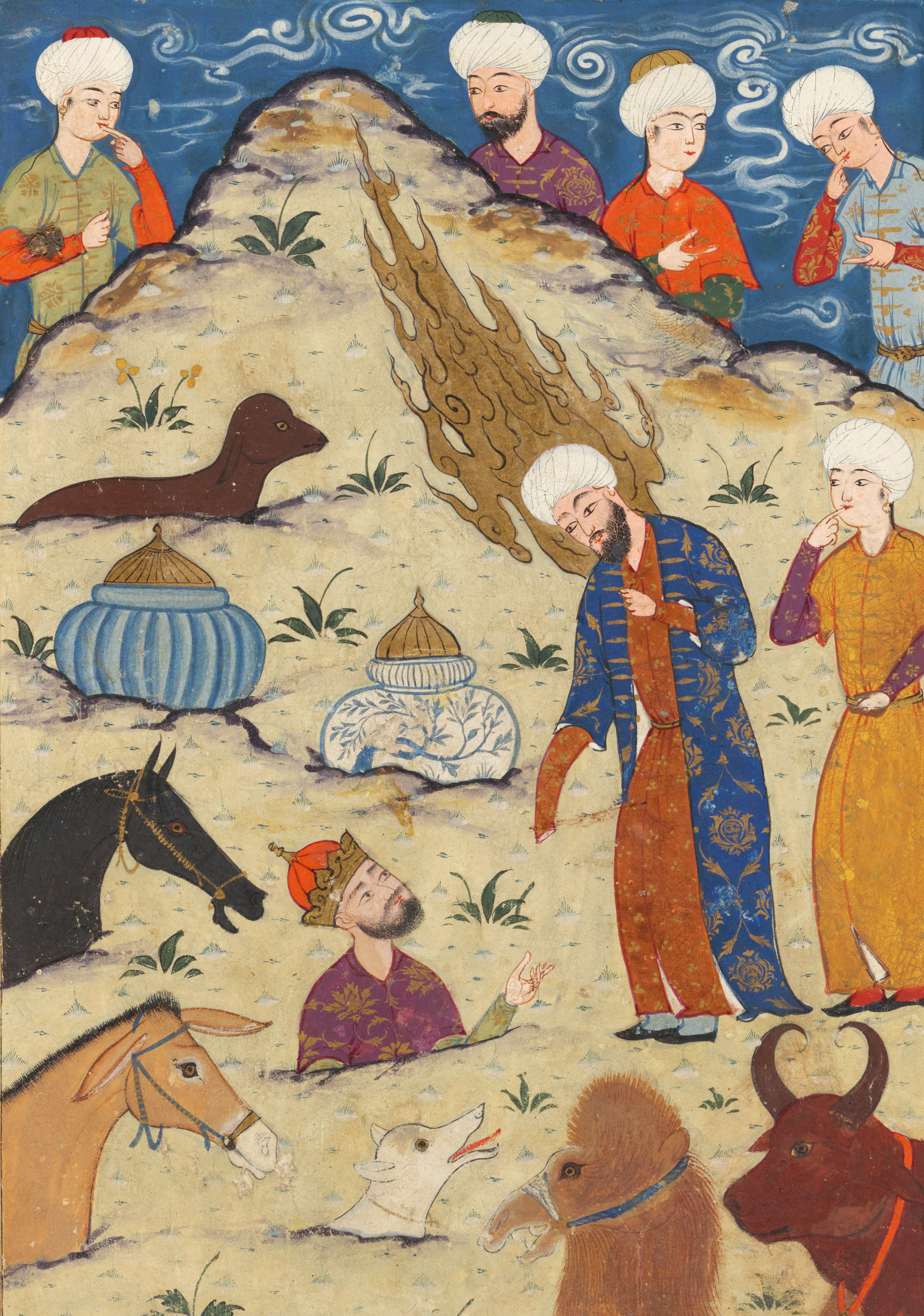
Islamic depiction of Musa watching Qarun and his palace be swallowed by the earth from a Persian 1580 manuscript.

Korah in Arabic is known as Qārūn (Arabic: قارون), his full name being Qārūn bin Yashar bin Qahat bin Lawi (Arabic: قارون بن يصهار بن قحاط بن لاوي) making him Moses' cousin, whose name is given as Musa bin Imran bin Qahith (Arabic: موسى بن عمران بن قحاط). He was mentioned several times in the Qur'an as an arrogant, wealthy man from the people of Moses who opposed the prophet and his own people, which led to his downfall. He's also one of the figures of power condemned alongside the Pharaoh and Haman.

=== In the Qur'an ===
Korah is mentioned three times in the Qur'an. The first mention comes in Surah al-Qasas in which his narrative is told in verses (ayat) 76-82. In it, he's mentioned as someone who behaved arrogantly against his own people. Although he was granted wealth, described as "treasures that even their keys would burden a group of strong men," he was advised by others to be instead grateful to Allah and seek the hereafter without forgetting his share of the world. However, Korah replied, "I have been granted all this because of some knowledge I have." Korah was also a self-publicist who wore glamorous clothes in front of poor people who envied him for what he had. In return, the educated people shamed him for his pride in himself over being grateful for Allah's reward. The last verses describe his downfall as being swallowed up by the earth alongside his home without anyone to help him. The people who envied him have become humble.

He is then mentioned in the next Surah, verses 38 and 39 of al-Ankabut, among the many ancient people that God destroyed due to their corruption and rejection of him. The verses state:

۝And the people of ’Ȃd and Thamûd, which must be clear to you from their ruins. Satan made their deeds appealing to them, hindering them from the Way, although they were capable of reasoning.
۝Also Korah, Pharaoh, and Hamân. Indeed, Moses had come to them with clear proofs, but they behaved arrogantly in the land. Yet they could not escape.

Korah is lastly mentioned in the 24th verse of Surah Ghafir again alongside the Pharaoh and Haman as one of the people who rejected Moses and called him a magician and a liar.

According to Ibn Kathir, one of the main lessons of Korah's story is that wealth does not indicate whether God is pleased with its owner or not.

=== In Islamic thought ===
According to a tradition, Korah once paid a prostitute to accuse Moses of having intimate relations with her. Thus giving him a bad reputation among his people. But he was cleared out once she confessed and revealed the plot. This tradition is used as an explanation of the 33rd verses of Surah al-Ahzab in which Moses was mentioned to have been framed but was cleared off by God.

Also, according to Islamic scholar al-Baydawi, Korah at one point brought a false accusation against Moses of being an immoral man. In response, Moses complained to God, who ordered him to command the earth what he pleased, and it would obey him. Doing so, the earth swallowed him alongside his riches and palace. Korah would sink slowly and yelled for mercy four times, but Moses continued to say, "O' earth, swallow them up!" According to Thomas Patrick Hughes, Korah's name became synonymous with wealthy people who don't give away to charity or practice zakat in the Islamic world.

In modern day, the story of Korah in Islam became synonymous with corrupt practices in modern day socio-economic capitalism, individualism, influencers, and materialism. Identifying Korah's arrogance with delusions of grandeur or having a superiority complex, and identifying his treatment of Moses and his people as exploitation.

== Other references ==
Korah is referenced in the New Testament in Jude 1:11: "Woe to them! They have taken the way of Cain; they have rushed for profit into Balaam's error; they have been destroyed in Korah's rebellion." (NIV)

The rebellion of Korah is also made reference to in chapter 11 of 2 Meqabyan, a book considered canonical in the Ethiopian Orthodox Tewahedo Church.

Korah is mentioned in the 1768 edition of The New England Primer. Here, as part of an alphabet, we read that "Proud Korah's troop was swallowed up" which is a paraphrasing of Numbers 16:32.

Korah is also mentioned by Irenaeus in his anti-Gnostic work Against Heresies (Koine Greek: Ἔλεγχος καὶ ἀνατροπὴ τῆς ψευδωνύμου γνώσεως), written in about 180. He criticized the excuse that some evil people in the Bible were credited with obtaining their power from God. Specifically he wrote that there are some who "declare that Cain derived his being from the Power above, and acknowledge that Esau, Korah, the Sodomites, and all such persons, are related to themselves."

The Dead Sea Scrolls also provide additional details about Korah, though which Korah is not certain.

== See also ==
- Karun Treasure
- Korach (parashah), the weekly Torah portion in the annual Jewish cycle of Torah reading that tells Korah's story.
- Korahites
