= Headless men =

Ancient Greek rumors

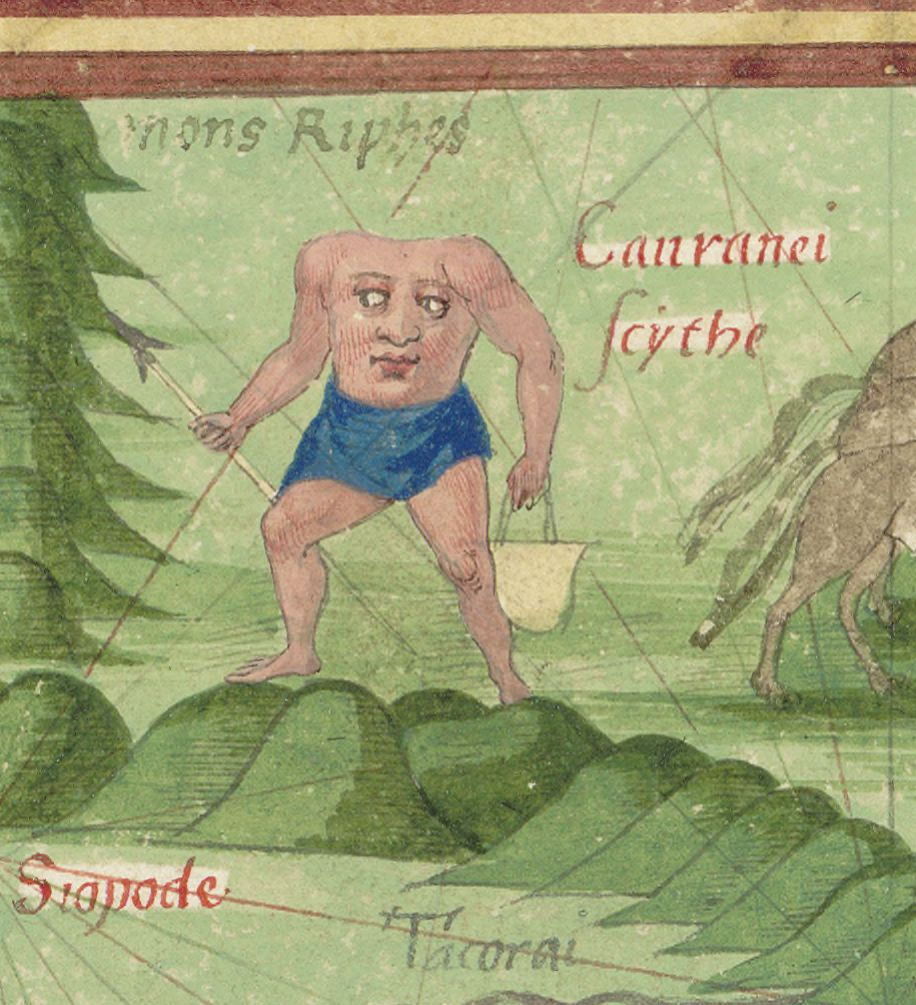
One of the Blemmyes, from a 1556 map by Guillaume Le Testu

Various species of mythical headless men were rumoured, in antiquity and later, to inhabit remote parts of the world. They are variously known as akephaloi (Greek ἀκέφαλοι 'headless ones') or Blemmyes (Latin: Blemmyae; Greek: βλέμμυες) and described as lacking a head, with their facial features on their chest. These were at first described as inhabitants of ancient Libya or the Nile system (Aethiopia). Later traditions confined their habitat to a particular island in the Brisone River, (Note: Also "Brixonte[s]", etc.) or shifted it to India.

Blemmyes are said to occur in two types: with eyes on the chest or with the eyes on the shoulders.

== Etymology ==
Various etymologies had been proposed for the origins of the name "Blemmyes", and the question is considered unsettled.

In antiquity, the actual tribe known as the Blemmyes were said to be named eponymously after King Blemys (Βλέμυς), according to Nonnus's 5th century epic Dionysiaca, but no lore about headlessness is attached to the people in this work. Samuel Bochart of the 17th century derived the word Blemmyes from the Hebrew bly (בלי) "without" and moach (מוח) "brain", implying that the Blemmyes were people without brains (although not necessarily without heads). A Greek derivation from blemma (Greek: βλέμμα) "look, glance" and muō/myō (Greek: μύω) "close the eyes" has also been suggested. Wolfgang Helck claimed a Coptic word meaning "blind" for its etymology.

Leo Reinisch in 1895 proposed that it derived from bálami "desert people" in the Bedauye tongue (Beja language). Although this theory had long been neglected, this etymology has come into acceptance, alongside the identification of the Beja people as true descendants of the Blemmyes of yore.

== In antiquity ==
The first indirect reference to the Blemmyes occurs in Herodotus, Histories, where he calls them the akephaloi (Greek: ἀκέφαλοι "without a head"). The headless akephaloi, the dog-headed cynocephali, "and the wild men and women, besides many other creatures not fabulous" dwelled in the eastern edge of ancient Libya, according to Herodotus's Libyan sources. Strabo, quoting Aeschylus, refers to them by the name sternophthalmoi (Greek: στερνοφθαλμοι "chest eyed").

Mela was the first to name the "Blemyae" of Africa as being headless with their face buried in their chest. In a similar vein, Pliny the Elder in the Natural History reports the Blemmyae tribe of North Africa as "[having] no heads, their mouths and eyes being seated in their breasts". Pliny situates the Blemmyae somewhere in Aethiopia (in, or in the neighbouring lands to Nubia). (Note: From the geographical description this was a desert area south and east of Egypt, between tributaries of the Nile, in Nubian-Egyptian border zone in the Eastern Desert.) Modern commentators on Pliny have suggested the notion of headlessness among Blemmyes may be due to their combat tactic of keeping their heads pressed close to the chest, while half-squatting with one knee to the ground. (Note: Comment by Louis Marcus (1829), taking hint from a passage in Heliodorus of Emesa Aethiopica Book V.) Solinus adds they are believed to be born with their head part dismembered, their mouth and eyes deposited on the breast. The term acephalous (akephaloi) was applied to people without heads whose facial parts such as eyes and mouth have relocated to other parts of the body, and the Blemmyes as described by Pliny or Solinus conform with this appellation.

== Middle Ages ==
By the 7th or 8th century, there had been composed a Letter of Pharasmenes to Hadrian, (Note: Particularly the F-group of text known as Fermes Letter, represented in Paris, Bibliothèque nationale, nouv. acq. lat. 1065.) whose accounts of marvels such as bearded women (and headless men) became incorporated into later texts. This included De rebus in Oriente mirabilibus (also known as Mirabilia); its Anglo-Saxon translation; Gervase of Tilbury's treatise; and the Alexander legend attributed to Leo Archipresbyter.

The Latin text in the recension known as the Fermes Letter (Note: Fermes Letter: "Est namque et alia insula in Brisone flumine, ubi nascuntur homines sine capite, habentes oculos et os in pectore; longi sunt pedes XII, lati et vasti pedes VII, colore et corpus auro simile".) was translated verbatim in Gervase of Tilbury's Otia Imperialia (ca. 1211) which describes a "people without heads" ("Des hommes sanz testes") of a golden colour, measuring 12 feet tall and 7 feet wide, living on an isle in the River Brisone (in Ethiopia). (Note: River Brisone was a fictitious distributary of the Nile. Commentators (Gervase, Gerner & Pignatelli tr 2006, pp. 298, 536) localize the Brison as being in Ethiopia.) (Note: Gervase, in his autograph manuscript (Rome, Vat. Lat. 933) admits to using the Letter as his source.)

The catalogue of strange peoples from Letter occur in the Anglo-Saxon Wonders of the East (translation of Mirabilia) and the Liber Monstrorum; a recension of Wonders of the East is bound in the Beowulf manuscript. The transmission is imperfect. No name is given to the headless islanders, eight feet tall in the Wonders of the East. (Note: Wonders says they live on "another island south of the Brixontes.." (Orchard tr.) presumably meaning another island in Brixontes River, but further south than the island where the donkey-eared, sheep-wooled, bird-footed animals called lertices dwell.) Epiphagi ("epifugi") is the name of the headless in Liber Monstrorum. (Note: Liber Monstrorum, I. 24: Epifugi, as the Greeks called them, are "eight feet tall and have all the functions of the head in their chests, except they are said to have eyes in their shoulders" (Orchard tr.); Latin text reads '..'quos Epifugos Graeci vocant et VIII pedum altitudinis sunt et tota in pectore capitis officia gerunt, nisi quod oculos in humeris habere dicuntur".) This form derives from "epiphagos" in a modified recension of the Letter of Pharasmenes known as the Letter of Premonis to Trajan (Epistola Premonis Regis ad Trajanum). (Note: XVII, 5 : est etiam in Brixonte insula in homines sine qua nascuntur captibus, quia in pectore et oculos habent in time, altitude novem pedum latitude et octo: hos epifagos vocamus.)

=== Alexander romances ===
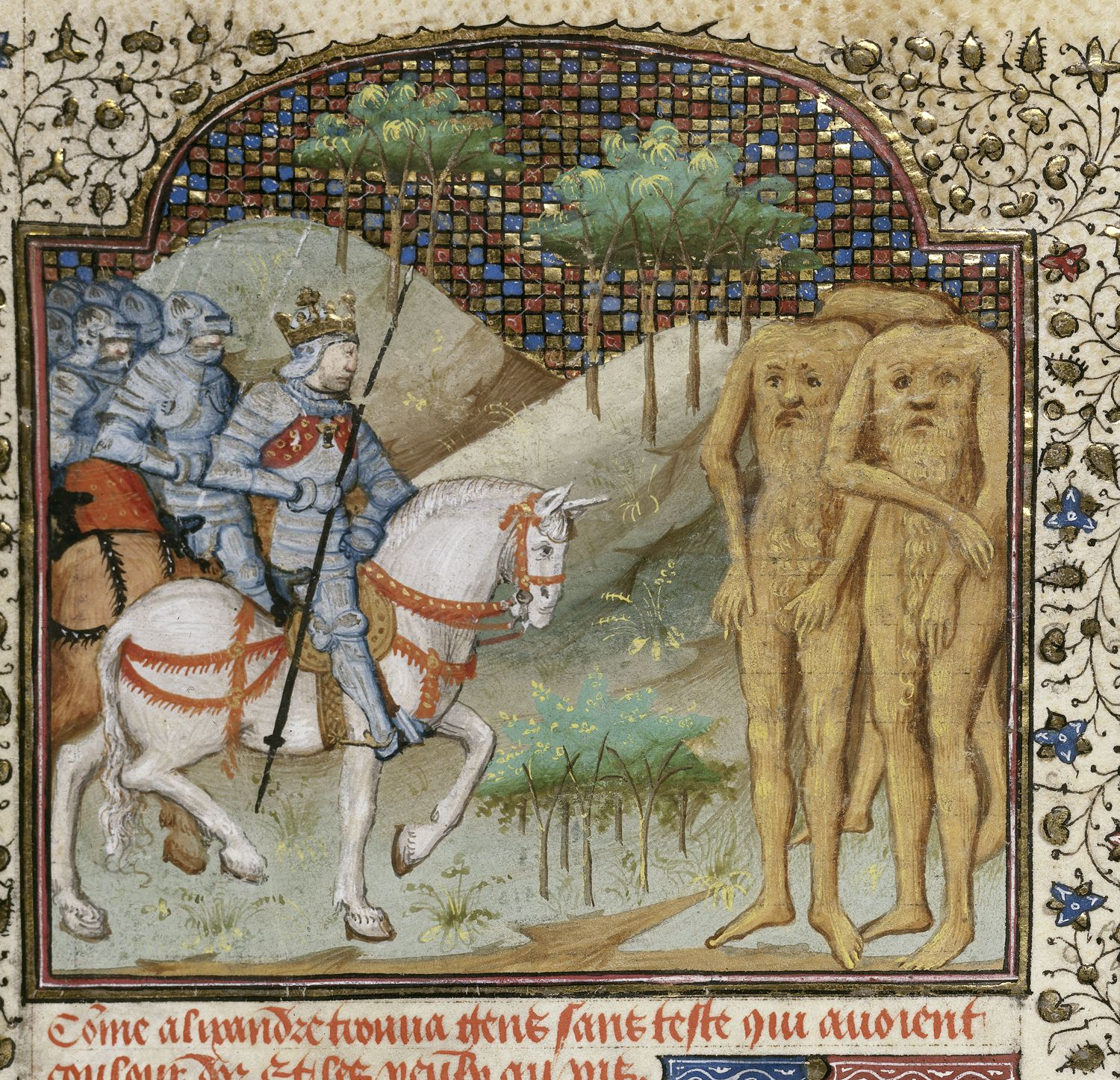
Alexander encounters the headless people —Historia de preliis in French, BL Royal MS 15 E vi, c. 1445

The Letter material was incorporated into the Alexander legend by Leo Archipresbyter, known as Historia de preliis (version J^{2}), which was translated into Old French as Roman d'Alexandre en prose. In the prose Alexandre the golden-coloured headless encountered by Alexandre measured just 6 feet tall, and had beards reaching their knees. In the French version, Alexander captures 30 of the headless to show the rest of the world, an element lacking in the Latin original.

Other Alexander books that contain the headless people episode are Thomas de Kent's romance and Jean Wauquelin's chronicle.

=== Medieval maps ===
Blemmyes or headless people were also illustrated and described on medieval maps. The Hereford Mappa Mundi (ca. 1300) places the "Blemee" in Ethiopia (upper Nile system), deriving its information from Solinus, perhaps via Isidore of Seville.

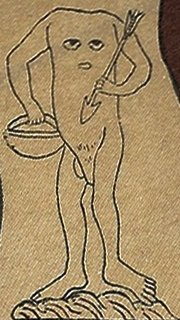
1) Blemee with face on chest

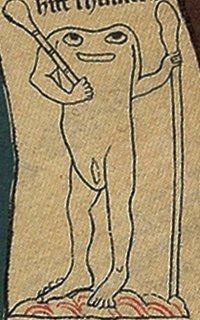
2) People with eyes at the shoulders

—Hereford Map (c. 1300)

One Blemee standing has his face on their chest, and another below him has "eyes and mouth at their shoulders". Both varieties of Blemmyae occur according to Isidore, (Note: Although Kline (2001) thinks the second type with eyes and mouth at shoulder should be identified as an "Epiphagi") who reported that in Libya, besides the Blemmyae born with a face on the chest, there were reputedly "others, born without necks, [and] have their eyes on their shoulders". Some modern commentators believe the two different types represent the male and female blemmyes, with their genitals explicitly drawn. Another example is the Ranulf Higden map (ca. 1363), which bears an inscription regarding the headless in Ethiopia, although unaccompanied by any picture of the people. (Note: Inscription reads "Gens ista habet caput et os in pectore" and can be read above the spine of the Atlas, to the far right on the image Ranulf Higden map)

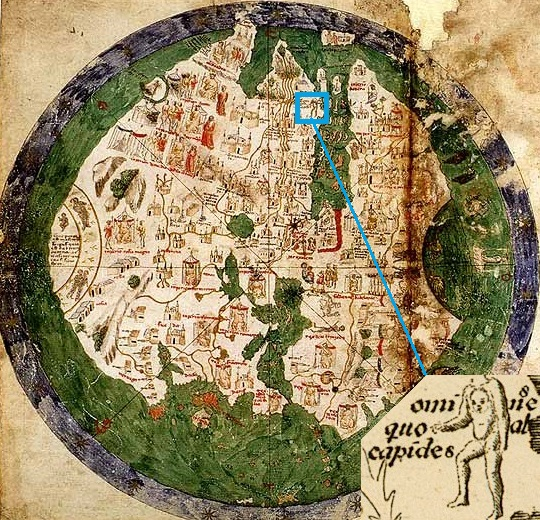
Headless placed in India. —Andrea Bianco map (1436)

By the Late Middle Ages, world maps began to appear that located the headless people further east, in Asia, such as the Andrea Bianco map (1436) that depicted people who "all do not have heads (omines qui non abent capites)" in India, on the same peninsula as the terrestrial paradise. (Note: Bianco locates the headless in the Orient, but the dog-heads still in Ethiopia.) But other maps of the period such as the Andreas Walsperger's map (ca. 1448) did continue to locate the headless in Ethiopia. (Note: Labeled "Hy haben vultum in pectore") The post-medieval map of Guillaume Le Testu (pictured above) illustrates the headless and the dog-headed cynocephali north beyond the Himalayan mountains.

=== Late Middle Ages ===
The Travels of Sir John Mandeville writes of "ugly folk without heads, who have eyes in each shoulder" with their mouths "round like a horseshoe, in the middle of their chest" living among the populace in the big island of Dundeya (Andaman Islands) between India and Myanmar. In other parts of the island are headless men with eyes and mouth on their backs. This has been noted as an example of Blemmyes by commentators, though Mandeville does not use the term.

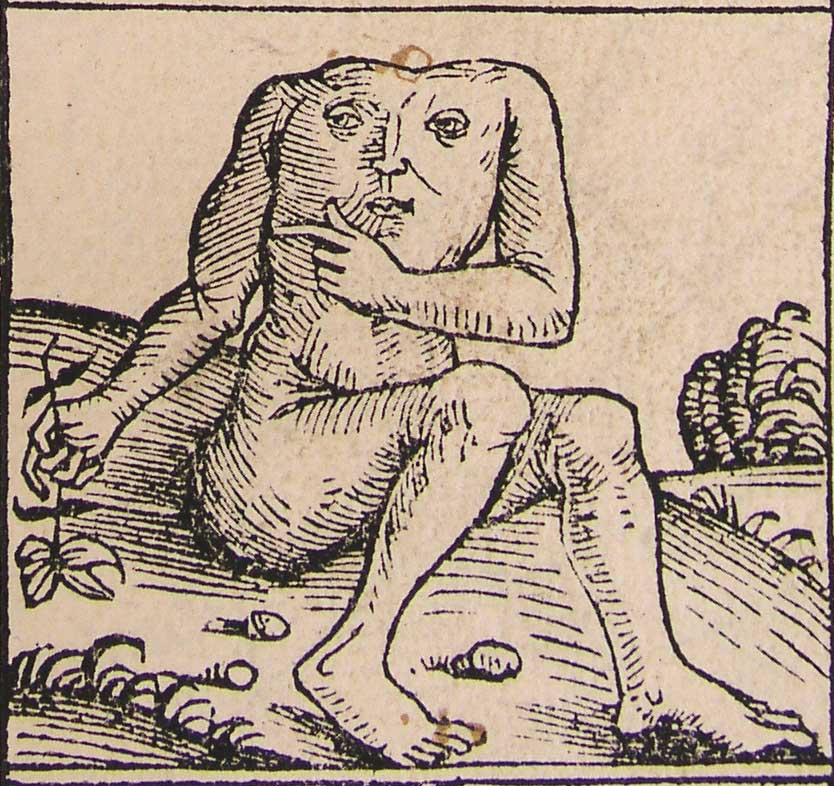
A Blemmya from Schedel's Nuremberg Chronicle (1493)

Examples of chapters on monstrous races (including the headless), taken from earlier sources, occur in the Buch der Natur or the Nuremberg Chronicle.

The Buch der Natur (ca. 1349), written by Conrad of Megenberg, described the "people without heads (läut an haupt)" (Note: Husband & Gilmore-House 1980, p. 47 refers to them as the "acephalous" but original German is followed here) as "shaggy all over with coarse hair, like wild animals", (Note: sint über al rauch mit hertem hâr, sam diu wilden tier)") but when the printed book versions appeared, their woodcut illustrations depicted them as smooth-bodied, in contradiction to the text. Conrad lumped peoples of various geography under "wundermenschen", and condemned such wondrous people as earning physical deformities due to the sins of their ancestors. (Note: Thomas of Cantimpré, who was Conrad's primary source also associated the headless with sin, but allegorically. To Thomas the headless represented unscrupulous lawyers.)

== Age of Discovery ==
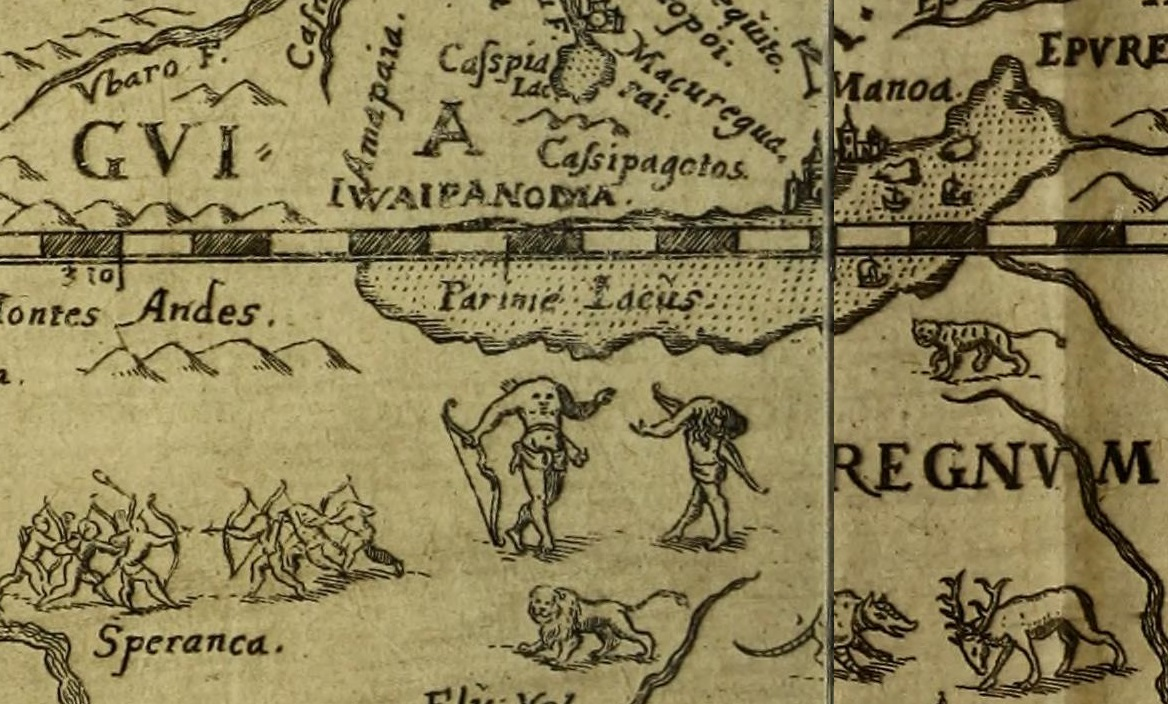
Headless Ewaipanomas (1599 engraving)

During the Age of Discovery, a rumor of headless men called the Ewaipanoma was reported by Sir Walter Raleigh in his Discovery of Guiana, to have been living on the banks of the Caura River. Of the story, Raleigh was "resolved it is true, because every child in the provinces of Aromaia and Canuri affirm the same". He also cited an anonymous Spaniard's sighting of the Ewaipanoma. Joannes de Laet, a somewhat later contemporary, dismissed the story, writing that these natives' heads were set so close to the shoulders that some were led to believe their eyes were attached to the shoulders and the mouth to their breasts.

During the same period (around 1589–1600), another English writer, Richard Hakluyt, described a voyage by John Lok to Guinea, where he found "people without heads, called Blemines, having their eyes and mouth in their breast." The authorship of the report is ambiguous.

The commonalities between Raleigh and Hakluyt writings might suggest the existence of an urban legend at that time, since both were English writers, writing during the same period, about trips to different continents (Africa and Latin America).

Ewaipanomas were depicted on numerous later maps using Raleigh's account as a reference. Jodocus Hondius included them in his 1598 chart of Guyana and in a display various Amerindian peoples in a map of North America released in the same year. Cornelis Claesz, who had worked alongside Hondius on numerous occasions, reproduced this display in a 1602 map of the Americas, but modified the Ewaipanoma to possess a true head but lack a neck, setting the figure's head at the level of the shoulders. Ewaipanomas began to decrease in popularity as a cartographic motif after this point; Hondius' 1608 world map does not include them, but merely notes that headless men are reported in Guyana while casting doubt on the veracity of these claims. Pieter van den Keere's 1619 world map, which includes a Claesz-like neckless figure in a display of Amerindian tribesmen, is the last to depict Ewaipanomas.

== Later explanations ==
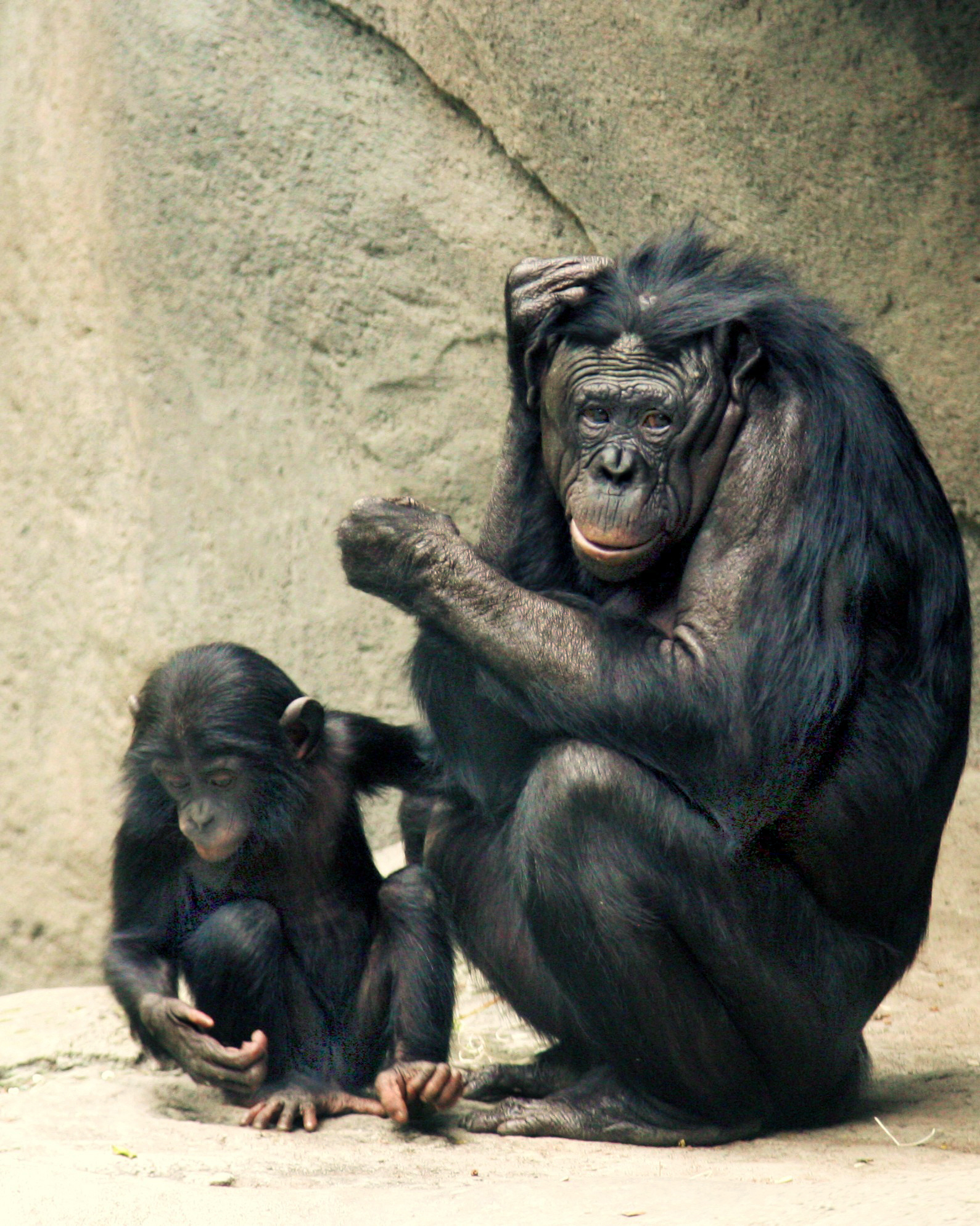
Bonobos, a species of Pan (related to the chimpanzee) in the great apes

Explanations similar to de Laet's were repeated in later years. In the Age of Enlightenment, Joseph-François Lafitau asserted that while "acephalous" races were actually present in North America, they were no more than a local trait of having the head set deep in the shoulders. He argued that reports of "headless" traits in the "East Indies" by writers of antiquity is evidence that people of the same genetic pool migrated from Asia to North America. Contemporary literature say certain writers attribute Blemmyes' physique as an ability to raise both shoulders to an extraordinary height, and ensconcing their head in between.

Other explanations have been offered for the legend of their unusual physique. As noted earlier, native warriors perhaps employed the tactic of keeping head tucked close to the breast while marching with one knee on the ground. Or, perhaps, they had the custom of carrying shields ornamented with faces.

Europeans also formerly considered Blemmyes to be an exaggerated report about apes.

In a 2025 article, Karl Brandt proposed that the legend of the Blemmye may have been inspired by the dried and modified remains of hammerhead sharks. The descriptions of Blemmyes with eyes on their shoulders and a horseshoe-like mouth in their chest fits that of a hammerhead’s cephalofoil when reimagined as a torso. Historical Blemmye territory such as the Red Sea coast, the Andaman and Nicobar Islands, and the Orinoco Delta are renowned for their hammerhead populations.

== Parallels in other cultures ==
Headless men also appear in several Asian legends. Breast-eyed races (war-čašmān) are recurrent in the Zoroastrian scriptures such as the Bundahishn. Men with eyes in their chests are mentioned in Ibn Wasīf Shāh's Digest of Wonders (Akhbār al-zamān) and by other medieval islamic geographers as Zakariya al-Qazwini. They also appear in the Syriac The Marvels Found in the Great Cities and in the Piri Reis Map.

In the Indian epic Ramayana, the demon Kabandha is a headless creature with one eye in the middle of his stomach and with extra-long arms. He is cursed to remain in this form until released by Rāma. In the Chinese classic text Classic of Mountains and Seas, the god Xingtian is described as having no head, and with his nipples as eyes and his belly button as a mouth. This is because he got decapitated in a battle against Huangdi. The yokai Dōnotsura in the Japanese folklore is depicted as a headless man with his face on his torso.

=== Image gallery ===
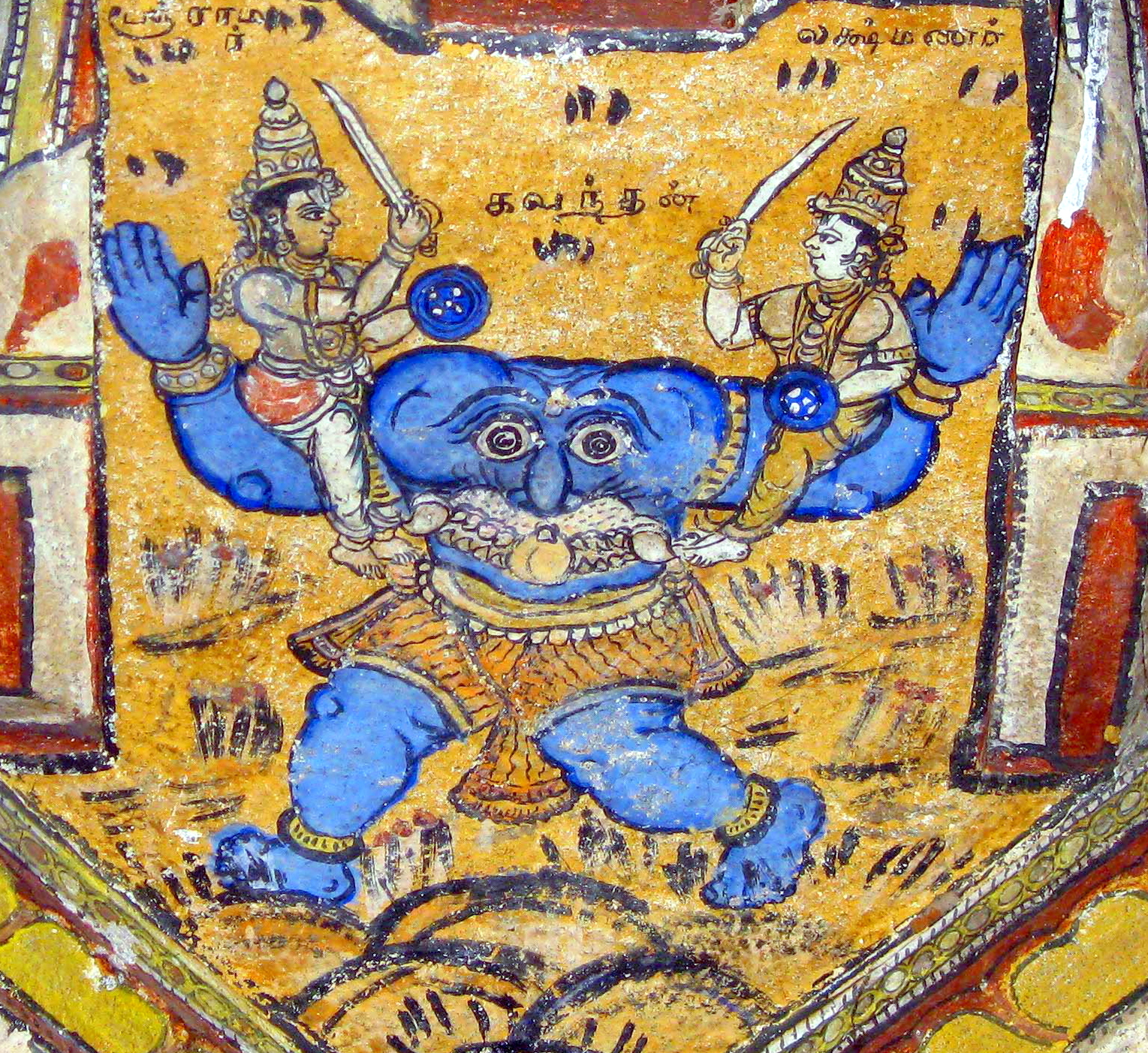
Kabandha

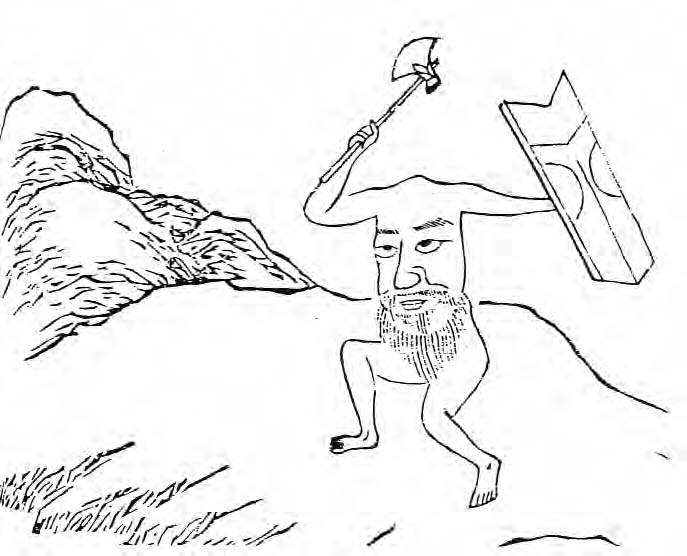
Xingtian

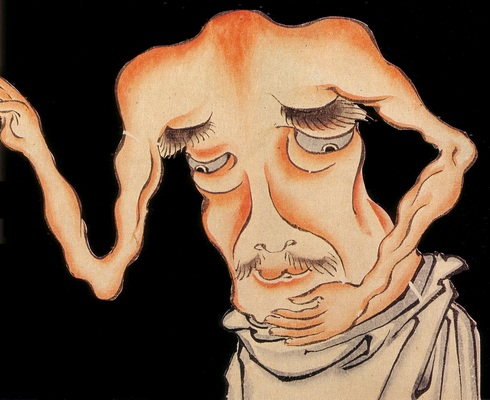
Dōnotsura

== In art ==
Likenesses of blemmyes are used as supports for misericords at Norwich Cathedral and Ripon Cathedral, from earlier local folklore. Writer Lewis Carroll is said to have invented characters based on objects in the Ripon church where his father served as canon, and in particular, the blemmyes here inspired his Humpty Dumpty character. The four giants who protect the fantasy land of Termina in The Legend of Zelda: Majora's Mask are similar to the headless men, in the matter that their head and torso occupy the same anatomical position. The Serious Sam video game series features a common one eyed recurring enemy called a Gnaar with a striking resemblance. A headless man was also featured as a monster-of-the-week in the Scooby-Doo! Mystery Incorporated episode "Attack of the Headless Horror".

== In literature ==
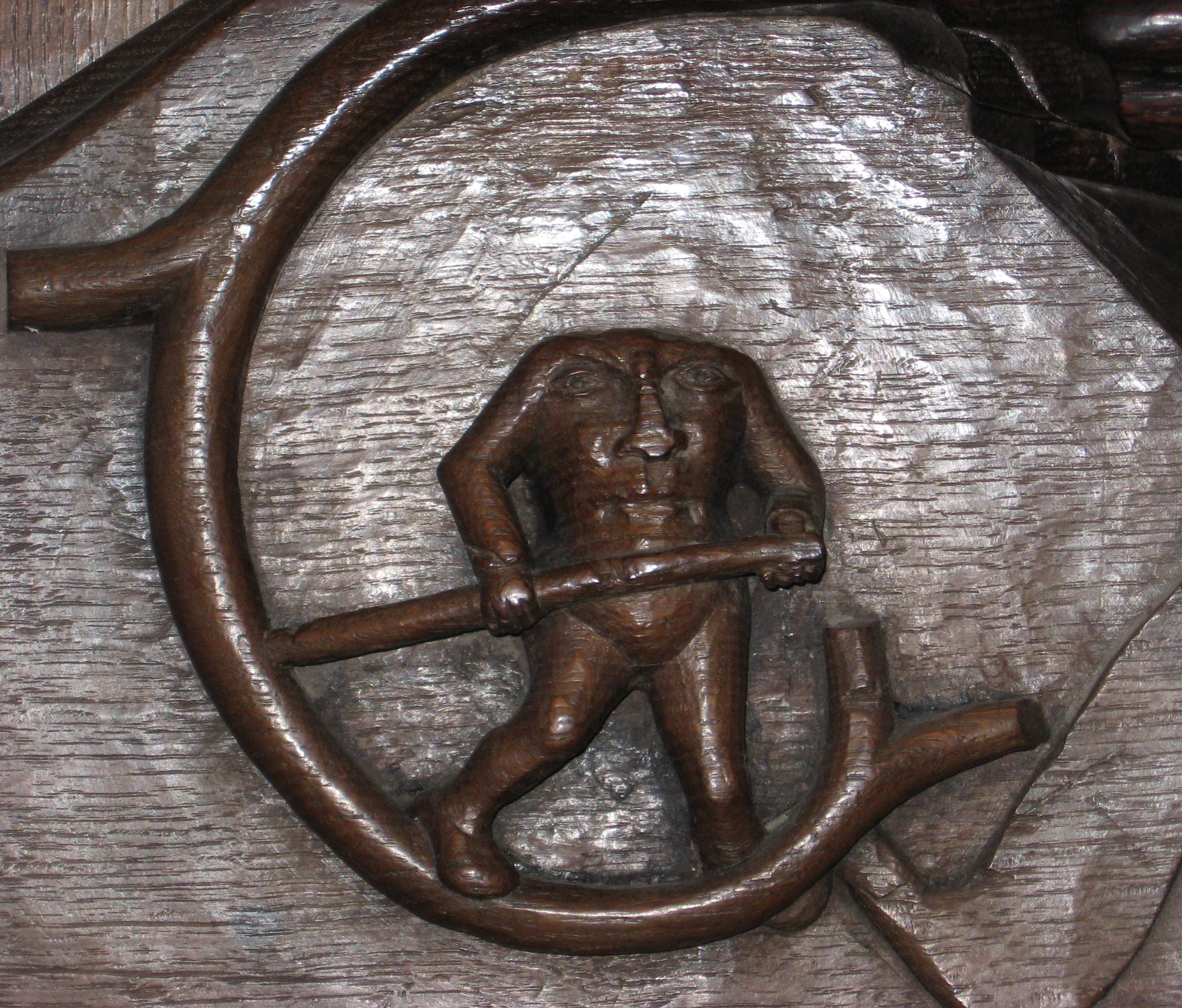
Blemyah, Ripon Cathedral

William Shakespeare's play Othello makes reference to "the Cannibals that each other eat, The Anthropophagi, and men whose heads Do grow beneath their shoulders". In his later play The Tempest, Gonzalo admittedly believed when he was young "that there were such men whose heads stood in their breasts".

In William Mayne's 1987 children's book The Blemyah Stories, a family of Blemyahs spend a year in a medieval priory, carving stories from wood.

Gene Wolfe writes of a man with his face on his chest in his 1989 short story collection Endangered Species.

In Umberto Eco's 2000 novel Baudolino, the protagonist meets Blemmyes along with Sciapods and a number of monsters from the medieval bestiary in his quest to find Prester John.

In his 2006 book La Torre della Solitudine, Valerio Massimo Manfredi features the Blemmyes as fierce, sand-dwelling creatures located in the southeastern Sahara, and suggests that they are the manifestation of the evil face of mankind.

Science fiction author Bruce Sterling wrote a short story entitled "The Blemmye's Stratagem", included in his 2006 collection Visionary in Residence. The story describes a Blemmye during the Crusades, who is revealed to be an extraterrestrial. Sterling later stated that the idea for his story was taken from a children's story by Waleed Ali.

In Adrian Barnes's 2012 novel Nod, a character is described as a Blemmye as he violently attacks the protagonist.

In Rick Riordan's 2017 fantasy novel The Dark Prophecy, headless men appear as the goons and bodyguards of Emperor Commodus.

In Emil Ferris's acclaimed graphic novel My Favorite Thing Is Monsters, the narrator has a headless stuffed toy named Blemmy.

The creatures turn up on day 304 of the One Thousand and One Nights as translated by Sir Malcolm C. Lyons. The headless men with eyes on their chest defend the Brass City where the ifrit keeps a kidnapped princess as prisoner.

In Clark Ashton Smith's short story "The Door to Saturn", a race of headless men known as "Blemphroims" inhabit the planet Saturn.

In Gary Gianni's graphic novel series, MonsterMen and Other Scary Stories, a pair of headless men appear in a mystery involving a haunted castle.

== Gallery ==
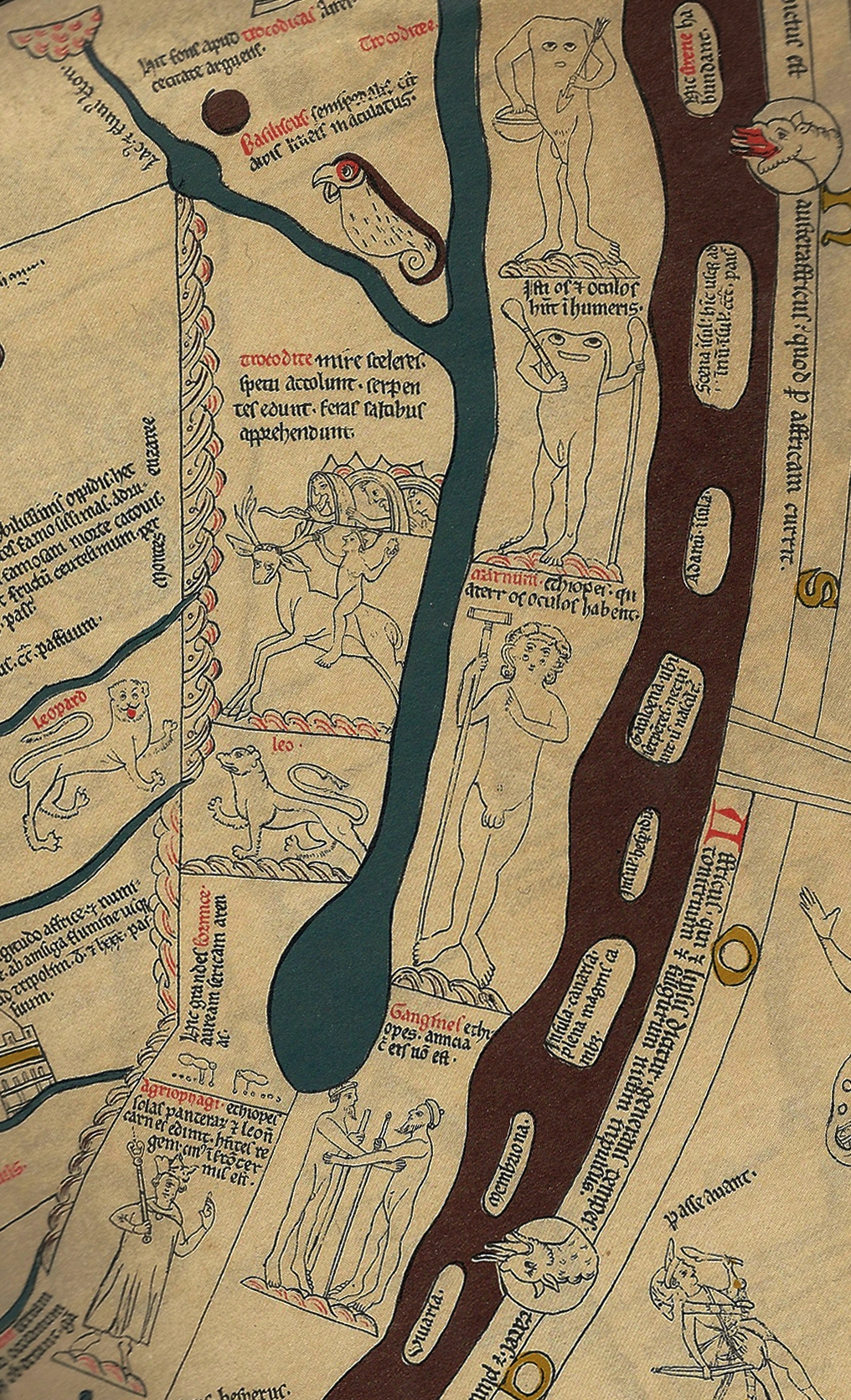
Blemee on the Hereford Mappa Mundi (detail, Nile system)

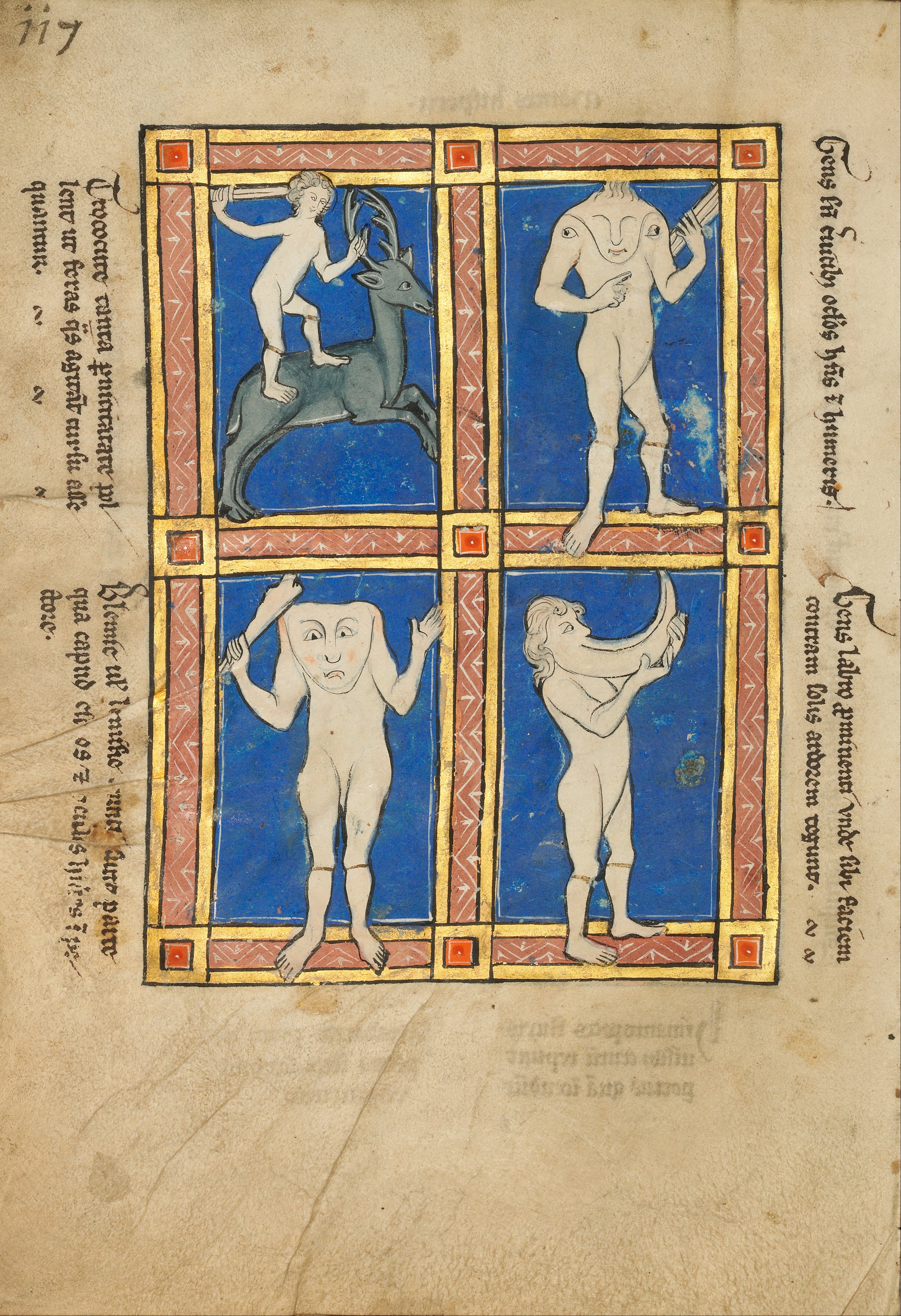
13th-century bestiary leaf

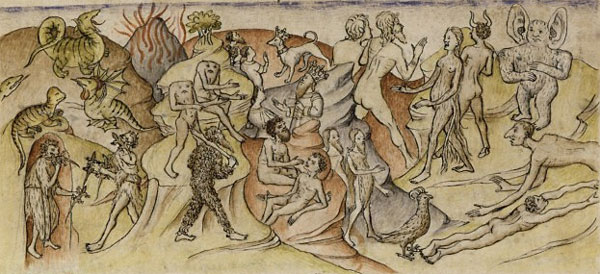
Wondrous people of Ethiopia, 1377 manuscript of Secrets de l'histoire naturelle

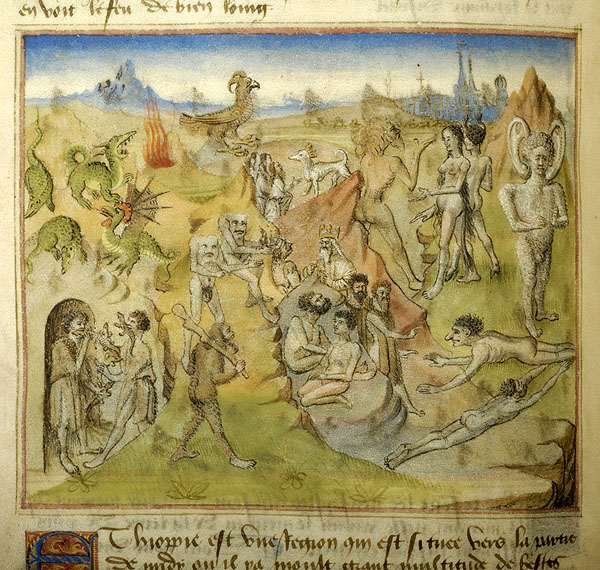
Wondrous people of Ethiopia, ca. 1460 Livres des Merveilles du Monde

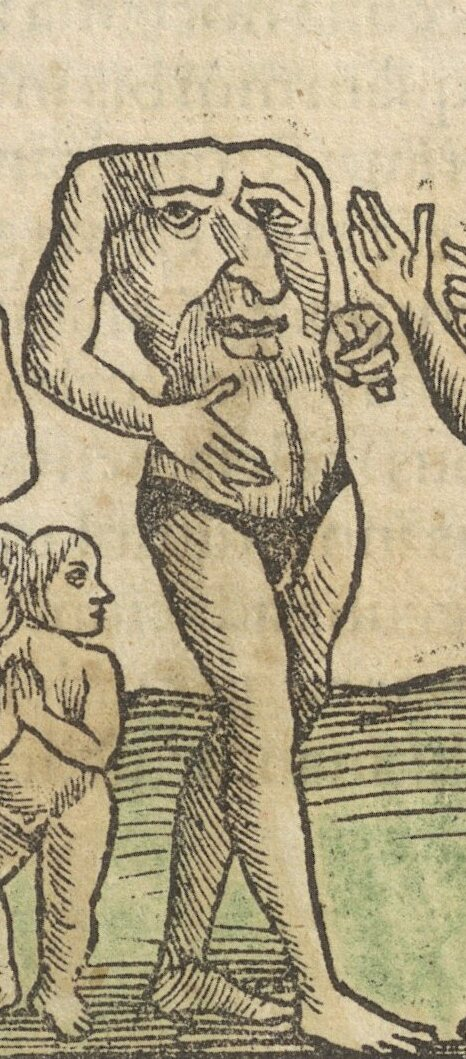
Blemmya, 1544 woodcut in the Cosmographia by Sebastian Münster

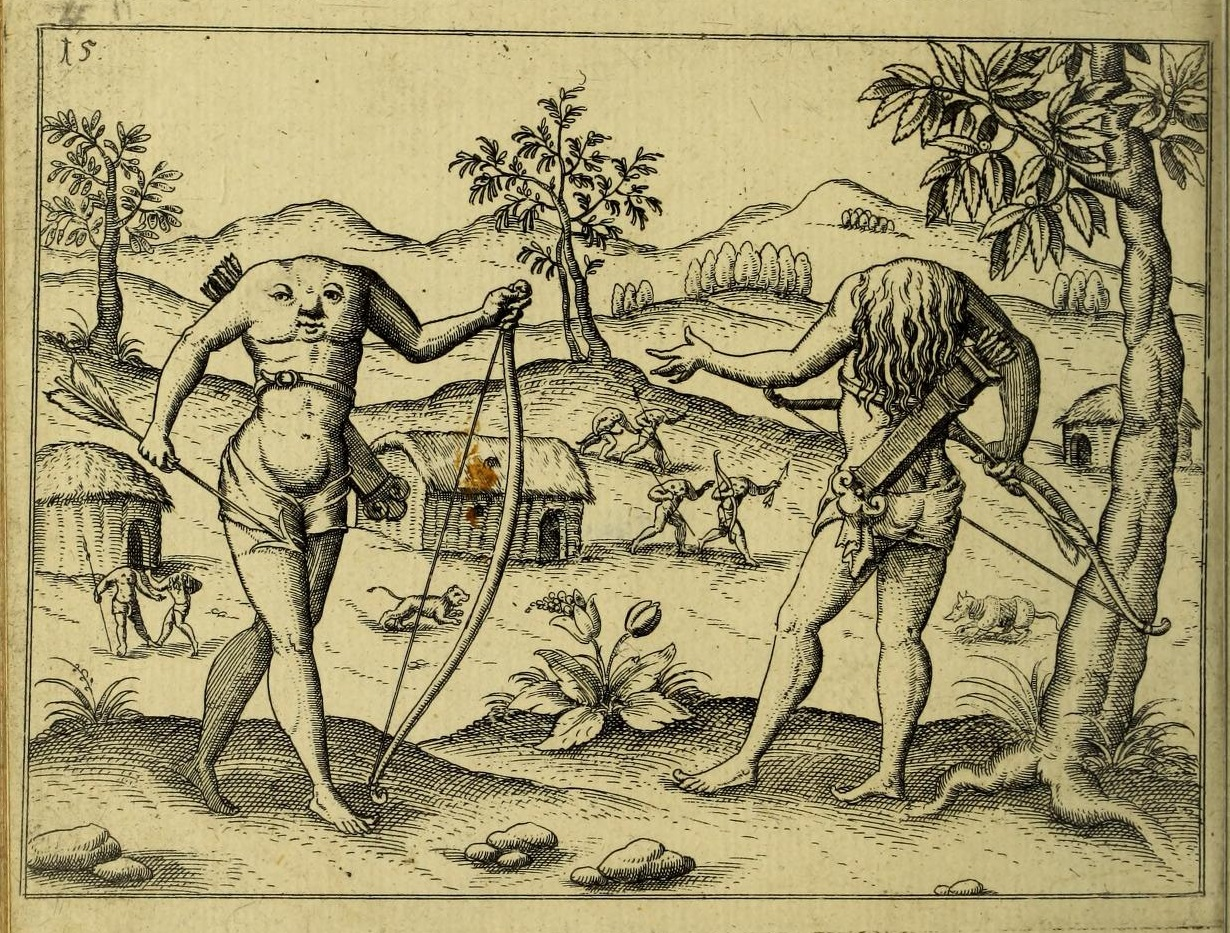
Headless from 1599 engraving in Sir Walter Raleigh's The Discovery of Guiana

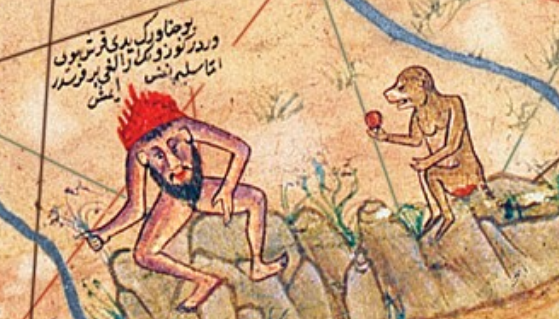
A closeup of the Piri Reis Map shows a headless man holding what appear to be flowers.

== See also ==
- Acephaly (disambiguation)
- Anthropophage
- Blemmyes
- Coluinn gunn cheann – Scottish headless monster (Popular Tales of the West Highlands)
- Gossamer (Looney Tunes)
- Headless Horseman
- Headless priest
- Kabandha
- Mapinguari
- Satannish
- Xingtian
