= The Discovery of Guiana =

Book by Sir Walter Raleigh (1596)

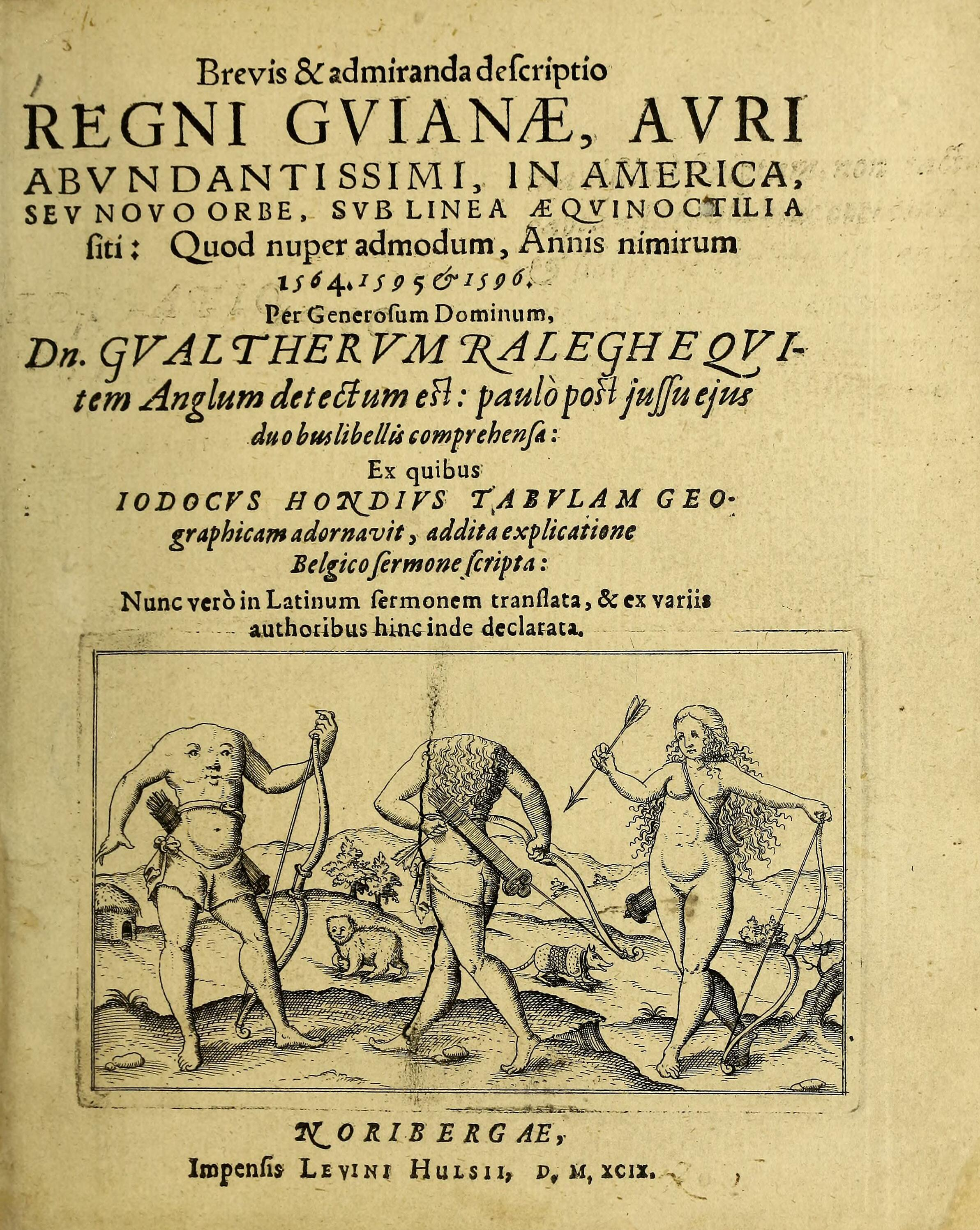
- Title page of a Latin edition of the Discovery, Brevis & admiranda descriptio regni Guianae, avri abundantissimi, in America, 1599
- Author: Sir Walter Raleigh
- Original title: The discovery of the large, rich, and beautiful Empire of Guiana, with a relation of the great and golden city of Manoa (which the Spaniards call El Dorado)
- Genre: travel literature
- Published: 1596

The Discovery of Guiana is a book by Sir Walter Raleigh, who wrote this account one year after his 1595 journey to Guiana, the Venezuelan region of Guayana. He also visited Trinidad. The book includes some material of a factual nature, but postulates the existence of a gold-rich civilisation (El Dorado) on the basis of little evidence.

== Full title ==
As was common practice in this time period, The Discovery of Guiana had a longer name: The discovery of the large, rich, and beautiful Empire of Guiana, with a relation of the great and golden city of Manoa (which the Spaniards call El Dorado). However, today it is generally simply referred to as The Discovery of Guiana.

== Background ==
After enjoying several years of high esteem from Queen Elizabeth I, which stemmed in part from his previous exploits at sea, Raleigh suffered a short imprisonment for secretly marrying one of the Queen's ladies-in-waiting. In an attempt to bring himself back into favour, Raleigh sailed to Guiana in 1595, hoping to find gold and other material to exchange or extort.

== Reception ==
One modern scholar remarks of this journey, "Although the expedition itself was hardly a success—Raleigh conquered no lands, found no stores of wealth, and discovered little not observed by earlier adventurers—he created a triumph for himself by publishing The Discovery."

== Claims versus findings ==
The title page of the Latin edition shows people without necks. Raleigh's dubious report that such people lived in Guiana may have given Shakespeare a line for Othello.

And of the Cannibals that each other eat,
The Anthropophagi, and men whose heads
Do grow beneath their shoulders.

However, there are references in classical literature to headless men which Shakespeare may have known.

=== Gold ===
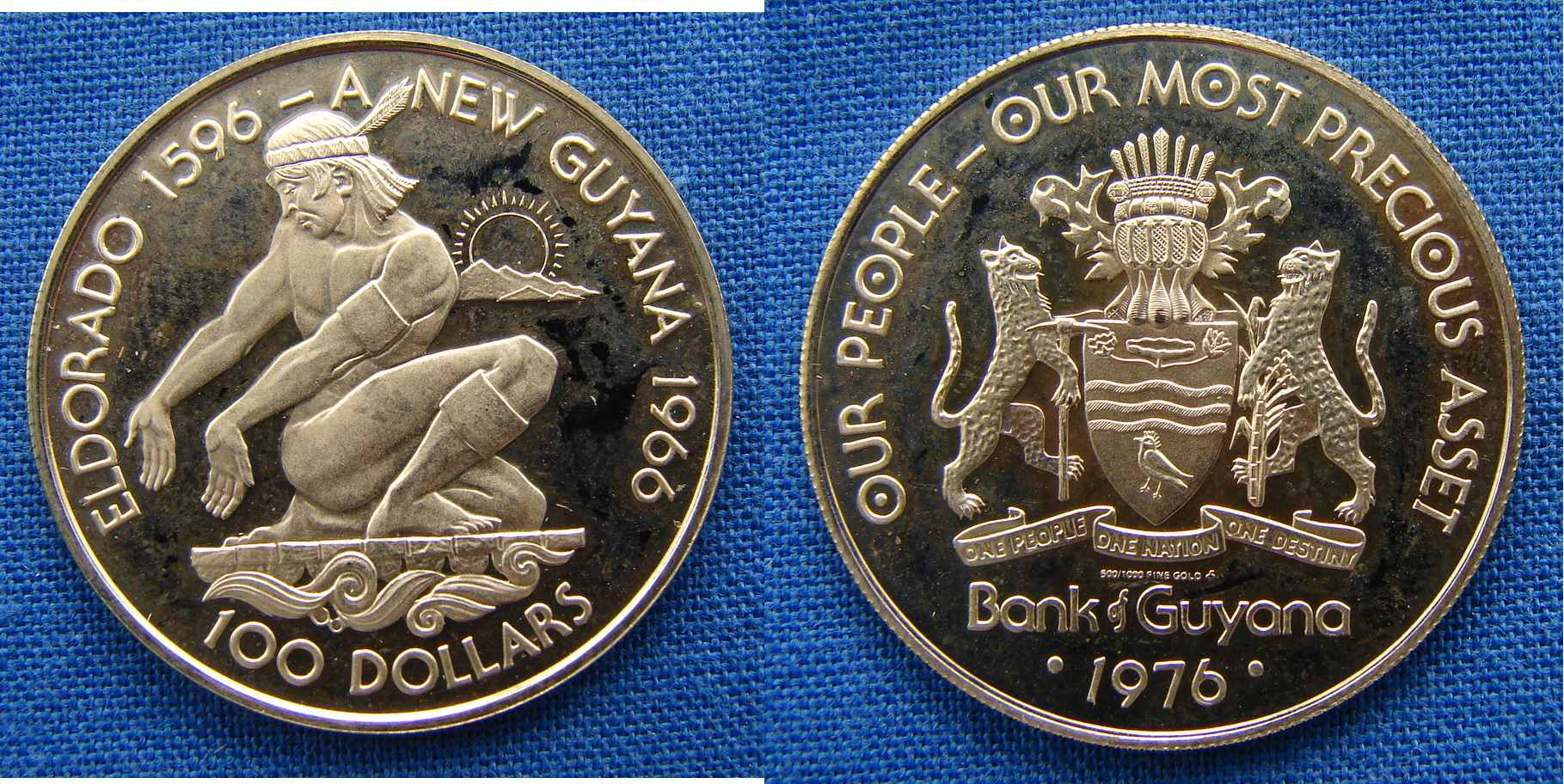
Guyanese 100-dollar gold coin (1976), commemorating the book and 10 years of independence from British rule

There are gold deposits in Venezuela, but Raleigh appears to have exaggerated how easy it was for him to find gold there. Venezuela's gold was not exploited on a large scale before the 19th century when mines were developed at places like El Callao.

Raleigh having promised Queen Elizabeth a "gold-rich empire more lucrative than Peru", King James was probably a little more willing to temporarily forgive Raleigh's charge of treason to see if he could find the place he had claimed to have found, and make it profitable. But the scholar argues that this came from Raleigh's prodigious literary skill, wherein he was able to make it sound like he had found much gold, but without ever saying or relating the precise finding of it, or bringing anything back.

He returned to Guiana in 1617 after a twelve-year imprisonment at the hands of King James I. On this second voyage, Raleigh's men, under the command of Lawrence Keymis, attacked the Spanish on the river Orinoco on 1617–18. At Raleigh's subsequent trial, he was not only tried for treason against the crown for disobeying King James I's orders to avoid engaging in combat with the Spanish, but, argues one scholar, also for essentially lying about the abundance of gold to be had in Guiana.
