= List of Scooby-Doo! Mystery Incorporated episodes =

This is a list of episodes for the animated television series Scooby-Doo! Mystery Incorporated, the eleventh incarnation of Hanna-Barbera's Scooby-Doo series of Saturday morning cartoons. The series is produced by Warner Bros. Animation. Unlike most previous series, Scooby-Doo! Mystery Incorporated features an overarching story. In addition to the traditional cases they always solve, the team finds itself being nudged into the uncovering of a dark secret that is hidden in the past of Crystal Cove, covered up by parties unknown. Following cryptic hints from a faceless mystery-man known only as "Mr. E" (a play on "mystery"), they find themselves caught up in the unsolved, decades-old case of the disappearance of four mystery-solving youths and their pet — the original Mystery Incorporated.

Two 26-episode seasons of 52 "chapters" aired on Cartoon Network from April 5, 2010, to April 5, 2013.

== Series overview ==
Season	Episodes	Originally released	
Season	Episodes	First released	Last released
1	26	April 5, 2010	July 26, 2011
2	26	July 30, 2012	April 5, 2013

== Episodes ==
=== Season 1 (2010–11) ===
No. overall	No. in season	Title	Directed by	Written by	Original release date
1	1	"Beware the Beast from Below"	Curt Geda	Mitch Watson	April 5, 2010 (Sneak peek); July 12, 2010 (Season re-air)
A slime monster living underneath Crystal Cove is cocooning anyone who gets in its way. Despite being warned not to continue investigating by their parents and authority figures, the gang attempts to solve the mystery. While investigating the caves under Crystal Cove, Daphne finds a locket containing a photo of a young couple. The gang realizes that the cocoon is made of a frozen yogurt-like substance from a new dessert shop, then realize that the new shop and the bank are near each other. After trapping the monster in the dessert shop, they reveal the monster is their science teacher who was trying to tunnel into the bank. Later, the gang receives a call from "Mr. E", who says "the real mystery has just begun". Overarching Mystery Events: A locket shaped like a magnifying glass found in the Crystal Cove caves and a call from Mr. E. Villain: The Slime Mutant/Professor Emmanuel Raffalo Note: The Green Ghosts, Werewolf, Miner 49er, Captain Cutler, Space Kook, Creeper and Charlie the Robot from the original Scooby-Doo, Where Are You! series make cameo appearances in the Haunted Museum as statues. Also, in the museum tour group, a man resembling Don Knotts is present (Scooby-Doo teamed up with Knotts in The New Scooby-Doo Movies).
2	2	"The Creeping Creatures"	Curt Geda	Jed Elinoff & Scott Thomas	July 19, 2010
Mr. E informs the gang that a mystery is waiting in the nearby ghost town of Gatorsburg. The theft of their engine prompts them to check into the local hotel. A sinister message appears to Scooby, who is later forced to spend the night in the Mystery Machine. He's attacked by gator people and leads them back into the hotel where they chase the gang, only stopping once the gang steps out of Gatorsburg. The gang returns and realizes that the gator people are passing artificial gatorskin products off as real. They reveal that the gator people are the only three residents of the town (the hotel's owner, her son, and her brother, the mechanic). Overarching Mystery Events: Hotel sign reading "The dog dies!" and Mr. E's note claiming that Gatorsburg is "one piece of the puzzle". Villains: The Gator People/Greta, Gunther, and Grady Gator Note: A man resembling Clark Griswold, from the film National Lampoon's Vacation, appears in the cold open with his family as lost tourists, traveling in the distinctive Wagon Queen Family Truckster from the Vacation film. When Fred is showing Daphne his scrapbook of traps, he mentions some villains they caught with particular traps, including Carlotta the Gypsy and the Phantom of Vázquez Castle from the original Scooby-Doo, Where Are You! series. The panner in the Gatorsburg flashback is Nugget Nose from the Galloping Ghost segments of the Buford and the Galloping Ghost show. When Scooby breaks through the door where Fred and Daphne are, he recreates John Candy running from the bear and standing in front of the door out of breath in The Great Outdoors. The style and story of the episode are influenced by the 1976 horror film Eaten Alive, such as the look and setting of the rundown motel located in a deserted swampland and run by bizarre proprietors, the heavy use of red lighting, and the “killer” Gator People (a Nile crocodile in the film).
3	3	"The Secret of the Ghost Rig"	Victor Cook	Michelle Lamoreaux, Robert Lamoreaux & Mitch Watson	July 26, 2010
Crystal Cove is being terrorized by a mysterious ghost truck that has been running people off the highways. Meanwhile, crystal doorknobs all over the city have been disappearing, The gang investigates, discovering that the truck is outfitted with unique tires. They follow the tire tracks to a secret hideout where all the crystal doorknobs are stashed. Meanwhile, while Mayor Jones is running against George Avocados for reelection, Barty and Nan Blake try to set Daphne up with wealthy heir Rung Ladderton. With Angel's help, the gang finds out that Avocados purchased tires identical to those on the ghost truck, and that his father stole a priceless diamond long ago and hid it as a doorknob. Suspecting Avocados, the gang traps the ghost truck, only to discover its driver is Rung, who is not as wealthy as the Blakes believed and needs the diamond to restore his fortune. Villain: The Ghost Truck (driven by Rung Ladderton) Note: While making an ascot for Fred, Daphne hums the main tune from The New Scooby-Doo Movies series. This episode, in particular the final chase scene, also pays homage to the 1971 Steven Spielberg film Duel.
4	4	"Revenge of the Man Crab"	Victor Cook	Adam Beechen	August 2, 2010
A giant crab interrupts a volleyball game at the Crystal Cove beach, taking the players hostage. This reflects badly on the game's sponsors, Trickle's Triquid. Fred constructs a trap for the crab, but it fails, and the crab takes Daphne. The gang then discovers a system of tunnels and catwalks under the beach, which the crab uses to get around. The gang traps the crab, revealing it to be the water company's mascot, Bud Shelton, who came up with the Triquid formula which Trickle stole and took credit for. Meanwhile, Mr. E sends the gang a newspaper article about four kids who disappeared in the caves, which Daphne uses to identify the kids in the locket photo. Villain: Man Crab/Bud Shelton Overarching Mystery Events: A newspaper photo revealing the kids in the locket as Brad Chiles and Judy Reeves. Note: Dylan and Brenda from the television show Beverly Hills, 90210 appear in the cold open as the first two victims of the giant crab beast. Older versions of Pebbles and Bamm-Bamm from The Flintstones appear briefly at the volleyball pitch.
5	5	"The Song of Mystery"	Curt Geda	Paul Rugg	August 9, 2010
A monster called Que Horrifico is turning the children of Crystal Cove into monsters, prompting the parents to move away. At school, Fred is being tutored by Mary-Ann Gleardon, who believes she's too smart for everyone. To help solve the mystery, Velma and the gang speak with a teacher at school who is familiar with Que Horrifico but believes he turns into the monster at night. They agree to watch him for the night, only for the real Que Horrifico to appear, commanding the children attack the gang. The gang accidentally turn a television on, and the children sit down to watch, revealing themselves to simply be pretending to be monsters. The gang traps Que Horrifico, who is revealed to be Mary-Ann, who wanted a Crystal Cove with no adults so she could turn the city into her utopia. Villain: Que Horrifico/Mary-Ann Gleardon
6	6	"The Legend of Alice May"	Victor Cook	Mitch Watson	August 16, 2010
Fred falls for new student Alice May, who he asks out to prom, much to Daphne's disgust. She later notices suspicious behavior from Alice and investigates, finding more suspicious behavior. Meanwhile, the gang stumbles onto the mystery of a ghost girl kidnapping her prom dates. They follow the clues to a cemetery, where the ghost girl attacks them. They hide in a crypt, where they find clues relating to the crimes of Deacon Carlswell, the Creeper. They also find a yearbook, where the original Mystery Incorporated is listed as a club. Everyone goes to prom, where the ghost girl attacks. The gang traps her, revealing her to be Alice. She's Deacon's daughter and wants revenge on the gang for getting her father locked up. Later, a man working for Mr. E releases Alice from prison, revealing Deacon never had a daughter and she was working for Mr. E as well. The man wants the gang to "start looking into the real mystery hiding beneath Crystal Cove – a mystery that led to the disappearance of four youths; a mystery whose time has come to be solved." Overarching Mystery Event: An old Crystal Cove High School yearbook introducing the gang to the original Mystery Incorporated; the revelation that Alice May was working for Mr. E, who wants the gang to investigate a specific mystery concerning the disappearance of four children. Villain: The Ghost Girl/Alice May Note: Members of the Chan Clan from The Amazing Chan and the Chan Clan are seen leaving the auditorium. This episode marks the first mention of Vincent Van Ghoul in the series, though he only appears on television. Deacon Carlswell, the Creeper from Scooby Doo, Where Are You!, is referenced.
7	7	"In Fear of the Phantom"	Lauren Montgomery	Mark Banker & Mitch Watson	August 23, 2010
The Hex Girls, Velma's favorite band, come to Crystal Cove on tour. Their concert is interrupted by The Phantom, who wants them to stop making and performing music. The Hex Girls refuse, so the Phantom attacks them, injuring lead singer Thorn. Daphne is tasked with performing as the new lead with an original song, and Fred realizes he has feelings for her. Scooby, angry with Shaggy for choosing prom with Velma over the film marathon, replaces him with a puppet. The Phantom attacks while they're fighting, and Shaggy notices the Phantom's pants match those of former internet sensation Fantzee Pants. The gang traps the Phantom when he tries to attack Daphne at the final concert, revealing him to be The Hex's Girls' writer, Daniel Prezette, also known as Fantzee Pants, who wanted revenge on The Hex Girls for unintentionally ruining his career. Villain: The Phantom/Daniel Prezette (Fantzee Pantz) Note: The Hex Girls' songs "Hex Girl" and "Earth, Wind, Fire & Air" from Scooby-Doo! and the Witch's Ghost are featured in this episode. Vincent Van Ghoul from The 13 Ghosts of Scooby-Doo also makes a cameo appearance. The motif of the mysterious disco Phantom of the music venue is a reference to the 1974 loose adaptation of The Phantom of the Opera, Phantom of the Paradise.
8	8	"The Grasp of the Gnome"	Victor Cook	John P. McCann & Mitch Watson	August 30, 2010
The gang attends Crystal Cove's Royal Knights Fair, where an evil gnome is paralyzing those dressed as pirates to punish them for their historical inaccuracy. Velma reveals her relationship with Shaggy, while the gang begins to suspect one of the fair's owners who vocally expresses hate for pirates and is short enough to be the gnome. While trying to trap the gnome, Shaggy is captured. Later, the gang successfully traps the gnome, revealing it to be Gil Littlefoot, who wanted to frame his wife for the attacks to claim her fortune. As the gang is walking through the fair, a hooded figure drops a box at Velma's feet. Inside is a note from Mr. E, telling Velma "this has all happened before" and a picture of the original Mystery Incorporated with their parrot, Professor Pericles, circled in red. Overarching Mystery Events: A photo of the old Mystery Incorporated team highlighting their parrot Professor Pericles; a note from Mr. E telling Velma not to give up on her relationship with Shaggy. Villain: The Gnome/Gil Littlefoot Note: Some of the men coming into the Royal Knights Fair seem to be dressed as Dirk the Daring from the game Dragon's Lair. Skipper Shelton from the episode "Revenge of the Man Crab" makes a cameo appearance.
9	9	"Battle of the Humungonauts"	Curt Geda	Roger Eschbacher	September 6, 2010
Two monsters, named Humungonauts by Sheriff Stone, are destroying properties in Crystal Cove. Fred decides the gang should call themselves Mystery Incorporated after those that came before them and orders the gang uniforms. Shaggy is forced to choose between Velma and Scooby. Mr. E helps point out to the gang that each Humungonaut is only destroying properties owned by a certain insurer. They trap the monsters, revealing them to be brothers Jax and Max Minner, who are attacking buildings insured by the other. Villains: Green Humungonaut and Red Humungonaut/Jax and Max Minner Note: This episode is an homage to the film The War of the Gargantuas, going so far as to reference the song "Stuck in My Throat" performed by Fran Southworth, written by H. B. Barnum and produced by Joey Levine. The Don-Knotts-lookalike can be seen sitting at a table in the cold open sequence. The Sheriff hypothesizes that one of the Humungonaut's green fur is the result of "outer-space gamma rays", a reference to the Incredible Hulk.
10	10	"Howl of the Fright Hound"	Victor Cook	Bart Jennett	October 4, 2010
When a violent dog begins terrorizing Crystal Cove, Stone wrongfully arrests and locks up Scooby-Doo. Velma finds a robotic leg at the scene of the crime and accuses Jason Wyatt from her robotics class who is obsessed with her. The gang then goes to visit Scooby in Crystal Cove's Animal Asylum, where they encounter the criminal genius Professor Pericles. He warns Fred to beware those closest to him. The hound attacks, and the gang breaks Scooby out. They trap the dog and its owner, revealing the owner to be Jason's mother, who wants revenge on the gang for not befriending Jason. Shaggy chooses Scooby over Velma, reflecting on how much he missed his dog. Velma is unimpressed and receives a text from Mr. E telling them to "follow the parrot". A news article reveals Pericles has escaped the Asylum. Overarching Mystery Events: A cryptic warning from Pericles telling Fred to beware those closest to him; a text message from Mr. E telling them to follow the escaped Pericles. Villain: Fright Hound/A robotic dog controlled by Mrs. Wyatt Note: This episode is a parody of The Terminator film series. There are also references to Aliens, another film by Terminator director James Cameron and to The Silence of the Lambs. Yogi Bear also makes a cameo appearance as a criminal in the animal asylum being restrained since he made an attempt to escape when the animals were set free. The Wax Phantom, a villain from the second season of Scooby-Doo, Where Are You!, is mentioned as the last attraction on the Crystal Cove haunted bus tour.
11	11	"The Secret Serum"	Curt Geda	Jed Elinoff & Scott Thomas	October 11, 2010
While the gang grows more divided, a vampire is stealing seemingly random items from around Crystal Cove. Velma and Daphne investigate separately, suspecting Nan Blake, while Fred, Shaggy, and Scooby investigate the botanical gardens. The gang reunites when the vampire steals an orchid. They visit the Dinkley library, where Ed secretly helps Daphne discover a joke youth serum requiring all the ingredients that have so far been stolen. They fail to capture the vampire when they try to trap her in a restaurant's wine cellar, but successfully capture her in a museum. She's revealed to be Nan's assistant, Sheila Altoonian, who is jealous of Nan's looks. Despite the success, the gang is still split, with Velma suggesting "maybe we're not a team anymore". Villain: Vampire/Sheila Altoonian Overarching Mystery Event: After assisting an unknowing Daphne, the man working for Mr. E is revealed to the viewer to be Ed Machine. Notes: One of the auction buyers is a cameo of "Mama" Cass Elliot, who made a full guest star appearance in The New Scooby-Doo Movies episode, "The Haunted Candy Factory". The auctioneer appears to be based on British TV antiques expert David Dickinson. There are a few similarities between this episode and the Scooby-Doo and Scrappy-Doo episode "I Left My Neck in San Francisco". Both episodes feature a female vampire as the monster of the week. Both episodes also use members of the Blake family as prime suspects for the person behind the disguise, although in the former, Daphne herself was the suspected culprit, not her mother.
12	12	"The Shrieking Madness"	Curt Geda	Adam Beechen	October 18, 2010
Now broken up, the gang decides to get on with their individual lives by touring the nearby Darrow University. When Char Gar Gothakon attacks the campus, the gang is forced to reunite. They investigate Prof. H.P. Hatecraft, who created the character. The attacks prompt him to admit his work is fiction, only for Char Gar Gothakon to kidnap him. The gang eventually traps the creature, revealing it to be student Howard E. Roberts, a superfan of Hatecraft's who wanted to destroy his critics. The gang then finds a chest full of Crystal Cove's history, and a note from Mr. E, saying the original Mystery Incorporated wouldn't have disappeared if they'd had that chest. Overarching Mystery Event: Darrow Family Archives are stolen from the university by Mr. E. Villain: Char Gar Gothakon/Howard E. Roberts Note: This episode parodies the "Cthulhu Mythos" of H. P. Lovecraft. Howard E. Roberts is a reference to Lovecraft's friend and fellow writer Robert E. Howard, although they have little in common apart from name and appearance. Writer Harlan Ellison voices himself, though the animated version appears as he did in the 1970s.
13	13	"When the Cicada Calls"	Victor Cook	Paul Rugg	October 25, 2010
A cicada creature is attacking Destroido employees after demanding they quit their jobs. Meanwhile, a new teacher at Crystal Cove High is also against Destroido for how environmentally harmful they are, openly criticizing Shaggy and Scooby's consumption of a Destroido-made snack. Because of the teacher's love for cicadas and because of Daphne's appreciation for him, Fred suspects the new teacher. The gang traps the creature at the Cicada Creature Festival, revealing it to be Grandma Moonbeam, the creator of the snack Shaggy and Scooby were eating, who wanted revenge on the company for changing her recipe. Villain: Cicada Creature/Grandma Moonbeam and her trained cicadas Note: This episode loosely parodies the popular Japanese horror visual novel and anime series Higurashi When They Cry (Japanese: ひぐらしのなく頃に, Hepburn: Higurashi no Naku Koro ni, lit. "When the Cicadas Cry"), in which the titular cries of the summer cicadas belie ill omens of a series of unusual deaths and disappearances, most often starting on the day of the Watanagashi Festival (綿流し祭, Cotton Drifting Festival) which is centered around delivering thanks and praise to the Hinamizawa village's guardian deity "Oyashiro-sama", who is feared and respected alike for his powerful "Curse" capable of "demoning away" disrespectful villagers.
14	14	"Mystery Solvers Club State Finals"	Victor Cook	Mitch Watson	May 3, 2011
The gang is forced to forfeit their place in the Mystery Solvers Club State Finals due to Scooby's illness. However, Scooby suddenly makes a recovery, and the gang attends the convention. All the human mystery solvers are taken hostage by Lord Infernicus, while Scooby, Jabberjaw, Speed Buggy, Captain Caveman and Jonathan Wellington "Mudsy" Muddlemore try and stop him. They discover that Infernicus has turned the humans into guinea pigs, then discover he's trying to take them out of Crystal Cove via train. Scooby and friends rescue their humans, and reveal Infernicus to be The Funky Phantom, who is angry that he's just seen as a sidekick. Scooby then wakes up, revealing the entire mystery was a fever-induced dream, and the gang tells Scooby he's much more than a sidekick. Villain: Lord Infernicus/Jonathan Wellington "Mudsy" Muddlemore (The Funky Phantom) Note: An episode-long homage to the golden years of Hanna-Barbera, this installment is almost entirely animated in the same visual style as Scooby-Doo, Where Are You!. All the "sidekicks" featured are from Hanna-Barbera Productions shows that copied the basic mystery-solving/sidekick formula that Scooby-Doo pioneered. This episode was posted on January 31, 2011 on iTunes and Amazon.
15	15	"The Wild Brood"	Curt Geda	Roger Eschbacher	May 10, 2011
Much to Daphne's dismay, Fred invites the gang on their second date. When the restaurant is attacked by a group of orcs called the Wild Brood, Daphne and Velma eagerly ride off with them. Elsewhere, a dangerous weapon is stolen from an armory, and the culprit is shown to be an orc biker. Fred blames Odnarb, the Brood's leader, while Daphne defends him. Velma notices a clue saying "swordfish" but she and Scooby are kidnapped by a shadow orc before she can inform anyone. The orc tells her to reroute a train, or he'll kill Scooby. Velma reflects on the irony of her having the chance to get Shaggy all to herself, then proudly admits she'd never do that to Scooby, and reroutes the train. She tells the Brood of the clue, and they realize that the shadow orc wants to steal the Swordfish game console. They reveal themselves to be a group of programmers and game developers, who dress up as orcs to blow off steam. They board the train to stop the shadow orc, who is revealed to be Maxwell, their copyboy who always wanted to work with them, not for them. Daphne is given the option to ride off with them, but chooses to stay with the gang. Villains: Shadow Orc/Maxwell the Copyboy Note: This episode is a parody of The Wild One. The name Odnarb is Brando spelled backward (Marlon Brando starred in "The Wild One").
16	16	"Where Walks Aphrodite"	Victor Cook	Bob White	May 17, 2011
Crystal Cove is taken over by Aphrodite, who spreads a love potion that turns the residents, including the gang, into love zombies. Scooby finds himself allied with Pericles, as both are unable to smell Aphrodite's potion and are thus immune. They discover an antidote, gather the ingredients, and make it, narrowly escaping Aphrodite and her love zombies. Scooby frees the gang from the potion. Velma discovers that Aphrodite is Amanda Smythe, a former Crystal Cove High student who was the victim of a cruel prank involving prom royalty. At a celebration where Aphrodite's love zombies are going to crown her, the gang frees everyone with the antidote and traps Aphrodite. Pericles disappears, and later, Ed Machine appears to the gang. He shows them a message Pericles sent to Mr. E, revealing that he sent Amanda the potion. Helping Scooby retrieve the antidote ingredients allowed Pericles to obtain three items he needed for reasons unknown. Overarching Mystery Event: The revelation of a feud between Pericles and Mr. E. Pericles reveals the three objects he needed from around town. Villain: Aphrodite/Amanda Smythe Note: This episode parallels the book and films based on Jack Finney's Invasion of the Body Snatchers, and the moment that motivates the villain is an homage to a moment in the film Carrie. A rival of Velma, commonly known by the nickname "Hot Dog Water" makes her first appearance in a non-speaking cameo.
17	17	"Escape from Mystery Manor"	Curt Geda	Bart Jennett	May 24, 2011
The gang visits the ruins of the Darrow family manor, as the original Mystery Inc. was looking into them. They become trapped inside, and a strange voice tests them with various traps. Velma realizes that the voice thinks they're the original Mystery Inc., as the traps are designed for them. As the gang searches for the voice, they find a golden disc piece. The voice, revealed to be Danny Darrow, the last survivor of the Darrow family, violently chases them as he tries to retrieve his disk piece. An earthquake causes the house to start falling apart, and upon realizing the gang is not the original Mystery Inc., Danny lets them keep the piece, hoping they can use it better than he and his family could. The gang escapes while Danny dies with the ruins of his mansion. Overarching Mystery Event: The gang learns more about the original Mystery Inc. through their investigation of the Darrow family manor. They find the first piece of the disk. Villain: Danny Darrow Note: This episode pays homage to the Saw film series.
18	18	"The Dragon's Secret"	Victor Cook	Jed Elinoff & Scott Thomas	May 31, 2011
Exchange student Mai Le arrives in Crystal Cove and joins the gang at the Blake mansion for a dinner party with Mr. Wang, a visitor from China. There, a Red Wizard attacks and warns them to stay away from the Dragon's Heart. Later, Mai Le and the gang are attacked by a White Wizard who is after Mai Le's ring. The Red Wizard saves them, but the ring is already gone. Mr. Chen of the local internet cafe and tea house reveals himself to be the Red Wizard, tasked with protecting the Dragon's Heart. Because the White Wizard now possesses all four rings, he can steal the Heart. The gang traps the White Wizard, revealed to be Mr. Wang, but the Heart remains missing. Mai Le is revealed to have stolen it, and she is stopped in the harbor by Shaggy and the gang. Villains: White Wizard/Mr. Wang, Mai Le Note: Linda Cardellini, who played Velma in the two live-action theatrical films, makes a short voice cameo appearance as "Hot Dog Water". Gizmo from Gremlins also makes a cameo appearance. The episode also seems to pay homage to the movie Big Trouble in Little China, through the use of the China town setting and with the two wizards resembling the two Lords of Death from the movies, of which the lightning effects seem to directly copy those of the movie.
19	19	"Nightfright"	Curt Geda	Paul Rugg	June 7, 2011
Scooby and Shaggy win a dinner with Vincent Van Ghoul, but the meal is interrupted by monsters from van Ghoul's films. The three run, but a fourth monster, Nightfright, emerges, prompting van Ghoul to reveal that Shaggy and Scooby are on a reality show where unsuspecting fans dine with van Ghoul only to get attacked by monsters from his films. Nightfright, however, is not one of those monsters and is not part of the show. Fred, Daphne, and Velma arrive after being called for help. A script featuring Nightfright is found, and the monster is revealed to be Arcus Fentonpoof, who only wanted his script adapted by proving Nightfright is scary. Villain: Nightfright/Arcus Fentonpoof Note: This episode marks the second appearance of Vincent Van Ghoul in the series; however, this is his first time appearing in person before the gang. This episode is a tribute to the films of Vincent Van Ghoul's inspiration, Vincent Price, notably House on Haunted Hill. The various monsters are inspired by Price's films, including Dr. Phibes and The Fly. The episode title alludes to Fright Night, a film that also involves the friendship between a horror host and a teen out to solve a mystery.
20	20	"The Siren's Song"	Victor Cook	Roger Eschbacher	June 14, 2011
Lonely, Velma investigates an anonymous tip about "Fish Freaks" haunting an abandoned Destroido oil rig. She is attacked by the Fish Freaks, and discovers a mermaid called Amy sent the tip. Velma enlists the help of the gang, only for them to get captured. They discover the Fish Freaks are attempting to drill for oil, which would cause a major environmental disaster. The gang stops the Fish Freaks, who are revealed to be Ernesto and the activists, who wanted to sell the oil to fund their projects. Amy reveals herself to be human. She went in disguise to get Velma to help rescue her husband, who was kidnapped by the Fish Freaks. Thanks to her, Velma realizes Angel is not who she says she is, but is instead Cassidy Williams of the original Mystery Incorporated. Villain: Fish Freaks/Ernesto and his group of activists Note: Scrappy-Doo and Flim Flam make cameo appearances in the Haunted Museum as statues. Ernesto is a parody of Che Guevara. Overarching Mystery Event: Velma discovers that Angel Dynamite is Cassidy Williams of the original Mystery, Inc.
21	21	"Menace of the Manticore"	Curt Geda	Adam Beechen	June 21, 2011
Mayor Jones buys an ancient Persian temple for Crystal Cove's Creepy Spooky Terror Land, only to find it haunted by a manticore who begins attacking visitors. Desperate, Mayor Jones asks Fred and the gang to help. The gang investigates, realizing the manticore is fake. Meanwhile, they discover the website Mayor Jones bought the temple off of is also fake, and was designed just for him to make the purchase. The gang traps the manticore, revealing it to be Hot Dog Water, who wanted the park closed so she could melt down the steel used on the roller coasters and process it into an expensive super-helium. While the gang investigates, Jones snoops around Fred's room, looking for the disk piece. Villain: Manticore/Marcie "Hot Dog Water" Fleach Note: "Hot Dog Water" is voiced by Linda Cardellini, who played Velma in the two live-action theatrical films. Overarching Mystery Events: The puzzle piece is revealed to the viewer to be part of the Planispheric Disk, and Mr. E is revealed to the viewer to be Ricky Owens of the original Mystery Inc.
22	22	"Attack of the Headless Horror"	Curt Geda	Paul Rugg	June 28, 2011
Fred's hero, adventurer Dr. Rick Spartan, begins teaching a biology class at Crystal Cove. Fred introduces himself and the gang, and Spartan invites the gang for dinner. At dinner, Spartan shows the gang his latest find--a cursed shrunken head. The headless body then attacks, threatening to hunt Spartan forever. After surviving a brutal attack, Spartan decides to give up adventuring. The gang suspects Spartan's partner Cachinga, but the Headless Horror attacks again after his arrest. The gang traps the monster, revealing it to be Spartan's wife Marion, who wanted him to settle down. Villain: Headless Horror/Marion Spartan Note: The Headless Horror is an anthropophage, a creature from Greek mythology.
23	23	"A Haunting in Crystal Cove"	Curt Geda	Mitch Watson	July 5, 2011
Mayor Jones becomes the victim in seemingly paranormal activity in his house, prompting the gang to investigate. Velma finds sunflower seeds, while hidden camera reveal the mayor is partially faking the attacks. The gang also discovers the mayor has a disk piece similar to the one they got from Danny. Eventually, the gang discovers Pericles is the villain, and is trying to get the mayor's piece, which he claims the mayor stole from him long ago. Pericles manages to escape with the piece. Overarching Mystery Events: The gang is made aware of a second piece of the disk, as well as Pericles' and Jones' involvement. Villain: Shadowy Figure/Professor Pericles Note: This episode contains several allusions to the film Poltergeist.
24	24	"Dead Justice"	Victor Cook	Jed Elinoff & Scott Thomas	July 12, 2011
The gang is in pursuit of the Piranha-Goat when the ghost of Crystal Cove's greatest sheriff, Iron Will Williamson, colloquially known as Dead Justice, captures the villain and gets the praise. After many more successes, Dead Justice is promoted to sheriff and receives an award Stone has held for years. Desperate to get his job and standing back, Stone teams up with the gang. They realize one of Stone's former deputies has drawings resembling Dead Justice's bullets and failed the sheriff's exam multiple times. They trap him, and Stone is reinstated. At the Clam Cabin, Fred and Daphne become engaged. Villain: Ghost of Dead Justice/Deputy Bucky Note: The Ghost of Iron Will Williamson is a visual homage to DC Comics hero Jonah Hex.
25	25	"Pawn of Shadows"	Curt Geda	Mitch Watson	July 19, 2011
The gang is attacked by a hi-tech assassin called the Obliteratrix, who tells them that they all have to die. This leads the gang to investigate the mystery of the Cursed Treasure further with the assistance of Professor H.P. Hatecraft (who suspects his rival Regina Wentworth to be the Obliteratrix). Along the way, they discover the fate of the original Mystery Incorporated. Angel traps the Obliteratrix, revealed to be Alice May, who was acting on orders from Mr. E. Unknown to the gang, a mysterious creature called "The Freak of Crystal Cove" watches them from the shadows, saying that in the end, the curse will end with them. Overarching Mystery Events: Details on the purpose of the disk and the truth behind the fate of the original Mystery Incorporated. Angel reveals her true identity to the rest of the gang. The Freak of Crystal Cove is revealed to the viewer. Villain: Obliteratrix/Alice May Notes: This is the second appearance of Professor H.P. Hatecraft, as he was last seen in the episode "The Shrieking Madness". This is also the second appearance of Alice May, as she last appeared in "The Legend of Alice May", where she was also the culprit. The entire cast of characters from Hanna-Barbera's Jonny Quest series makes a cameo appearance as Destroido lab workers during Alice May's flashback narration. The Dusk teen vampire romance book series that is mentioned is a parody of the Twilight series, with Regina Wentworth being a spoof of Stephenie Meyer. Cass Elliot makes a guest appearance when the gang go inside the meeting about "Dusk".
26	26	"All Fear the Freak"	Victor Cook	Mitch Watson	July 26, 2011
The gang looks into the treasure beneath Crystal Cove but are attacked by the Freak. They find the treasure in the caves below town but are followed by Pericles and the Freak. The Freak steals the gang's piece, and they chase after him. Fred is saved from falling to his death by the Freak, who is captured shortly afterwards. Fred pieces everything together, revealing the Freak to be Mayor Jones, who has been after the treasure since his arrival in Crystal Cove. Jones reveals that Fred's parents are actually Brad Chiles and Judy Reeves of the original Mystery Inc. Breaking off his engagement, Fred leaves to search for his true parents. Shaggy is sent off to military school, while Scooby is sent to a farm. As the gang is breaking up, Scooby encounters Pericles, who has both disk pieces. Scooby vows to get the gang back together and stop the bird. Overarching Mystery Events: It is revealed that Mayor Jones forced the original Mystery Inc. to leave town, taking in Brad and Judy's son to ensure they wouldn't return. The gang breaks up again, and Pericles is revealed to have the disk pieces. Villain: Freak of Crystal Cove/Mayor Fred Jones Sr.

=== Season 2 (2012–13) ===
No. overall	No. in season	Title	Directed by	Written by	Original release date
27	1	"The Night the Clown Cried"	Curt Geda	Mitch Watson	March 30, 2012 (Cartoon Network Video); July 30, 2012 (TV)
Crystal Cove comes under attack from a giant man-baby clown named Crybaby Clown. The town's new mayor Janet Nettles is approached by a mysterious figure who tells her the only way to save Crystal Cove is to enlist the help of the disbanded Mystery Inc. Nettles finds Scooby, already in the process of breaking out of a prison-like farm. They work together to recruit Shaggy and Fred, and the mysterious figure is revealed to be Velma. They are unable to get Daphne, as she is focused on her relationship with celebrity Baylor Hotner. Crybaby Clown attacks at a town meeting where the gang reveals their return. Fred comes up with a trap involving a donut shop, but his misguided faith in Daphne causes the trap to fail, and Crybaby Clown escapes. Villain: Crybaby Clown Note: Daphne's new boyfriend, Baylor Hotner, is a parody of actor Taylor Lautner and his success in the Twilight film saga. Velma's action and a throw-away line in this episode are similar to those of Rorschach of the Watchmen comic mini-series by Alan Moore; Velma even references Rorschach by name in this episode. Crybaby Clown is voiced by Mark Hamill, alluding to his role as the Joker in various animated DC Comics projects. Crybaby Clown's speech at the town hall meeting (after he rakes his nails across a chalkboard) parodies the scene from Jaws in which the shark hunter Quint (played by Robert Shaw) makes his first appearance. Within his speech, Crybaby Clown mentions two villains from the classic Scooby-Doo, Where Are You! series: Mano Tiki Tia and Redbeard's Ghost. This episode and the following one open with no credit sequence, just the title, to underscore the disbandment of Mystery Incorporated.
28	2	"The House of the Nightmare Witch"	Victor Cook	Adam Beechen	July 31, 2012
In Russia, Velma and Hot Dog Water are on a mission for Mr. E to retrieve a piece of the disk from a museum exhibit depicting the house of Baba Yaga. They fail, and the house comes to life and attacks. Later, the house is transported to Crystal Cove to be displayed in a museum, where it comes to life and runs away. The gang, now including Hot Dog Water, finds it in the woods and investigate. It comes to life again, but not before the gang finds a strange liquid leaking from the house. They manage to stop the house, revealing the villain to be museum curator Vronsky who was using the house to smuggle Fabergé eggs. The gang also finds the third piece of the disk, which Velma refuses to give to Mr. E. Overarching Mystery Event: The gang gets the third piece of the disk. Mr. E is revealed to be actively hunting disk pieces. Velma is revealed to have been working with Mr. E. Villain: Baba Yaga/Curator Vronsky Note: This episode and the previous one open with no credit sequence, just the title, to underscore the disbandment of Mystery Incorporated.
29	3	"The Night the Clown Cried II – Tears of Doom!"	Curt Geda	Michael F. Ryan	August 1, 2012
After the events of the previous episode, Crybaby Clown returns to Crystal Cove to kidnap a therapist, a hairdresser, a plastic surgeon, and a publicist. Velma realizes that Crybaby Clown may escape soon. Seemingly unrelated, Daphne and Baylor are planning to leave for Hollywood. Crybaby Clown takes Daphne, further motivating the gang to stop him. The gang chases Crybaby Clown to the airport, where they trap him. He's revealed to be Baylor, who wanted to build up his posse, and Daphne dumps him. She asks to rejoin the gang and is accepted. Meanwhile, Mr. E tries to recruit Cassidy, but she's done with him and Mystery Inc. He tells her that "they" are coming for Fred. Villain: Crybaby Clown/Baylor Hotner Overarching Mystery Event: The gang reunited. Mr. E tries to recruit Cassidy, but she says she's done with him. He reveals that people are coming for Fred. Note: This episode and the next one feature "Hot Dog Water" instead of Daphne in the opening credits. The photo held by her is also of Velma instead of Fred.
30	4	"Web of the Dreamweaver!"	Victor Cook	Benjamin Townsend	August 2, 2012
Hot Dog Water is voted out of the gang, much to Velma's dismay. Meanwhile, a creature called the Dreamweaver begins haunting people's dreams, resulting in them destroying their most prized possessions. His strange whisperings reveal that he's a character from Crypts and Creatures, which Shaggy used to play. Stone also used to play the game, and realizes he's the Dreamweaver's next victim, as all the other victims were people that he played with growing up. The gang realizes that the drawing of the Dreamweaver suggests he's right-handed, while the monster in people's dreams is left-handed. The gang invades the dream of the Dreamweaver, revealed to be victim Horbert Feist, who wanted revenge for losing his Crypts and Creatures character years ago. Villain: Dreamweaver/Horbert Feist Note: This is a parody of A Nightmare on Elm Street (Dreamweaver's power), Dreamscape (the fact that Dreamweaver invades people's dreams with a machine), and Labyrinth (the labyrinth in every dream sequence and Dreamweaver's crystal ball). Dreamweaver resembles both Freddy Krueger and Jareth, as well as Dream from The Sandman and Marvel Comics' villain Nightmare. Also, the role-playing game featured in this episode, Crypts and Creatures, is a parody of Dungeons & Dragons. The jokes about Crypts and Creatures being addictive may be a reference to the anti-gaming film Mazes and Monsters. A fantasy sequence depicting a moment in a Crypts and Creatures game features characters that look like Legolas and Gimli from The Lord of the Rings films and goblins based on the Rankin/Bass Productions adaptation of The Hobbit. Francilee Jackson, one of the Dreamweaver's victims, is a parody of Paula Deen. This episode and the previous one feature "Hot Dog Water" instead of Daphne in the opening credits for the last time, even though Daphne was officially back in the gang at the beginning of this episode.
31	5	"The Hodag of Horror"	Curt Geda	Roger Eschbacher	August 3, 2012
Gene Shepherd's Traveling Curio Cabinet of Curiosities brings a Hodag of Horror to Crystal Cove who comes to life and begins stealing from people. Meanwhile, Brad Chiles and Judy Reeves return, and all of Crystal Cove's elites attend a party hosted by the Blakes celebrating their return. Scooby falls in love with their dog, Nova. Daphne returns their locket, and the Hodag attacks, kidnapping Nova. The gang notices how a bell always rings before the Hodag attacks, and trap it. It's revealed to be cheese store owner Ned Fussbuster's assistant, Roberto, who is actually a monkey trained to steal jewelry. Fussbuster needed Roberto to steal Shepherd's key, as he owns a wheel of 500-year-old cheese. Fussbuster threatens to harm Nova, but Scooby saves her. Shepherd reveals the cheese told him to come to Crystal Cove. The gang breaks the wheel in half, revealing a piece of the disk inside. Elsewhere, the original Mystery Inc. is called together by Pericles, who has a proposition for them. Overarching Mystery Event: The fourth piece of the Planispheric Disk. The original Mystery Inc. reunites. Villain: Hodag of Horror/Roberto the Monkey (under the control of Ned Fussbuster via ringing bells) Note: This episode parodies Lady and the Tramp and the Hellraiser series. Nova's name is a reference to the mute primitive human character of the same name from the Planet of the Apes. This episode marks the return of Daphne to the opening credits, which remains for the duration of the series.
32	6	"Art of Darkness!"	Victor Cook	Benjamin Townsend	August 6, 2012
Modern artist Randy Warsaw presents his latest work of art, "Junk" to Crystal Cove. However, it comes to life and begins turning people into gold statues. Nettles asks the gang to solve the mystery, giving them an office in town hall. When the gang goes to the museum to investigate, everyone but Daphne is employed by Warsaw. Daphne investigates on her own but is attacked by Junk. In their office, the gang realizes that the gold statues are arranged like the main subjects of a painting, and the music playing whenever Junk attacks is a polka song slowed down. The gang traps Junk, freeing the people it supposedly turned to gold, and revealing Junk to be Butch Firbanks of the band who played at the exhibit, who wanted revenge on Warsaw for altering his image. Villain: Junk/Butch Firbanks Note: Randy Warsaw is a parody of modern artist Andy Warhol. The band "Sunday Around Noonish" is a parody of the band The Velvet Underground while Butch Firbanks and Eeko are respectively parodies of Velvet Underground members Lou Reed and Nico.
33	7	"The Gathering Gloom"	Curt Geda	Marly Halpern-Graser	August 7, 2012
A graveyard ghoul attacks the audience during Nettles' Horror Movie Night in the cemetery. The gang investigates and meet the owner of the cemetery, along with her three daughters. Fred and Shaggy become enamoured with them, while Daphne falls into a chocolate addiction. Velma and Scooby go alone to investigate, suspecting Evallo the gravedigger. Fred thinks it's dumb of Velma to suspect the obvious suspect, but Velma ends up being right as Evallo was trying to steal gas from Crystal Cove. With the revelation of gas on the mother's property, she becomes wealthy and decides she and her daughters will leave Crystal Cove. Cassidy begins a radio broadcast where she talks about evil in Crystal Cove. Mr. E and Pericles reflect and decide Cassidy must go. Overarching Mystery Event: It is revealed how Mr. E and Professor Pericles met each other. Now working together, they decide to kill Cassidy. Villain: Graveyard Ghoul/Count Evallo von Meanskrieg
34	8	"Night on Haunted Mountain"	Doug Murphy	Roger Eschbacher	August 8, 2012
Gary and Ethan are attacked by the Dark Lilith on Mount Diabla and lose the soccer team's lucky soccer ball. As the gang investigates, the monster attacks them and a band of hillbillies at their camp in nearby Scorpion Ridge. One of the hillbillies, "Ugly Jimmy", catches Daphne's eye as he is handsome unlike the rest of the tribe. Jimmy decides to help the gang solve the mystery. The gang falls into a cave and meets amnesiac explorer Boron, who has the lucky ball and believes it to be her lover. She leads the gang to the Dark Lilith's hideout after the monster attacks Jimmy. The hideout turns out to be an old Spanish galleon infested with traps. The gang finds the ship's log, makes it past the traps, and finds the fifth piece of the disk. Velma discovers Hot Dog Water is Lilith, who is still working for Mr. E, but she lets Velma keep the disk piece. The gang drives off unaware they're being watched by the ghost of a conquistador which says the single word "Nibiru" before fading away. Overarching Mystery Events: The ship's manifest, bearing the journals of the conquistadors who founded Crystal Cove, which describe their discovery of the treasure (a crystal sarcophagus filled with black pearls) that became the evil beneath Crystal Cove (which they named for the sarcophagus) and their use of the Planispheric Disk to mark its location after its burial; the fifth piece of the Disk. Villain: Dark Lilith/"Hot Dog Water" Note: This episode is a parody of A Night on Bald Mountain. The soccer ball with a face is similar to Wilson from the film Cast Away. The look of the hillbillies has also based on the look of the mutant family from The Hills Have Eyes and its sequels and remakes. This episode marks the second appearance of "Hot Dog Water" as the villain, the first being in "Menace of the Manticore".
35	9	"Grim Judgment"	Curt Geda	Mark Banker	August 9, 2012
The ghostly Puritan judge Hebediah Grim begins judging the young women of Crystal Cove. The gang initially suspects Ethan, believing him to be working with Gary to save girls from fake monster attacks. They investigate, but Ethan is cleared after he saves them from Grim. Grim continues to judge, and the gang comes to suspect drama student Doogle McGuineness. However, Grim attacks when the gang goes to confront Doogle. Brad and Judy offer to help trap Grim. They succeed, revealing there to be two Grims--Ethan and Gary. Daphne and Fred reveal they still like each other, while Nettles and Stone begin dating. Elsewhere, Cassidy spies on the gang, Brad, and Judy. Villain: Hebediah Grim/Gary and Ethan Note: This episode is a parody of the slasher genre. The costume Scooby wears while he and Shaggy are spying on Ethan at the soccer field is similar to that of Ariel from Disney's The Little Mermaid (1989). The cutaway sequence featuring the opening to a fictional TV series loosely based on the lives of Brad and Judy is a scene-for-scene recreation of the opening of the 1980s ABC series Hart to Hart. The parody is called "Sternum to Sternum", a reference to the chest, where the heart is contained.
36	10	"Night Terrors"	Victor Cook	Michael F. Ryan	August 10, 2012
The gang get stuck in the mountains, and seek lodging at the Burlington Library, where its caretaker Dan Fluunk introduces the mansion's history and the fascination of groups of four mystery solvers and an animal. As the night continues, the gang begin seeing strange and haunting things as well as a fiend with a canine-like head. Velma realizes the hallucinations are caused by the smoke of a special kind of wood. They capture the wood-burning fiend, revealed to be Fluunk. He reveals that he hates being the library's caretaker and schemed to use the smoke to scare visitors away and force the library to close. As the gang leaves, a book containing information on the disk is thrown from the window. Elsewhere, Cassidy searches for information on mystery solving groups. Overarching Mystery Events: The repeating pattern of mystery-solving groups--including the Darrow family and both incarnations of Mystery Incorporated--being haunted by the Planispheric Disk and the treasure it leads to, all of them consisting of four sleuths and an animal mascot; the Planispheric Disk user manual. Villain: Fiend/Dan Fluunk Notes: This episode bears similarities to the film The Shining. The gang's snowsuits are similar to the ones they wore in the Scooby-Doo, Where Are You! episode "That's Snow Ghost". Also, the family vacationing is the exact same family who was vacationing in the episode "The Creeping Creatures".
37	11	"The Midnight Zone"	Curt Geda	Mark Banker	August 13, 2012
A World War II Nazi robot attacks Cassidy at her radio station. She goes to the gang for help, explaining robots have been attacking her for weeks. The gang discovers they're coming from under the sea, so Daphne recruits her babysitting charges, Tom and Tub, to take them to The Midnight Zone. As they approach The Midnight Zone, the gang is attacked by robots. They stumble upon a base, where the robots are being manufactured. They discover the corpse of Abigail Gluck, a former member of the Benevolent Lodge of Mystery, who says "Nibiru", then discover Pericles is behind the robots. They escape as the base begins self-destructing, but Cassidy stays behind to hold open the jammed door. Everyone returns to the surface except Cassidy. Pericles gets the sixth piece of the disk. Overarching Mystery Events: The lost original settlement of Crystal Cove, which vanished over three centuries ago, now submerged beneath the sea; its inhabitant missionaries were the conquistadors who were the source of Crystal Cove's curse; the base revealed to have been constructed by Frau Abigail Gluck, a member of an old mystery-solving group, the Benevolent Lodge of Mystery; her body whispers "Nibiru" upon its discovery; the final piece of the Planispheric Disk, found by Professor Pericles. Villain: Kriegstaffelbots and Sea Specter (controlled by Professor Pericles) Notes: Tom and Tub's parents are said to be Dr. Paul Williams and Captain Michael Murphy, which are characters from the Hanna-Barbera show Sealab 2020. Tom, Tub, and Scooby the Seal appeared in the Hanna-Barbera series Moby Dick and Mighty Mightor. Their submarine, the Moby, is a reference to their whale friend Moby Dick from the same series. The title is a parody of The Twilight Zone. The design for the Kriegstaffebots is a reference from the fantasy/thriller anime "Jin-Roh: The Wolf Brigade" that was published in 1999.
38	12	"Scarebear"	Victor Cook	Erin Maher & Kathryn Reindl	August 14, 2012
A bear-like creature has been stalking the grounds near Destroido for weeks. The gang investigates, discovering Destroido has allowed toxic lithium to spill into the nearby water. This has destroyed the avocado farm of George Avocados, who the gang suspects. The gang steals an ID badge, and sneaks into Destroido's lab, where they find hundreds of experiments on animals. They're attacked by the Scarebear and narrowly escape. At a Destroido charity event, the bear attacks again, and is revealed to be Benson Fuhrman, a victim of a faulty product Destroido released knowing its defects. A bomb is found at the event, but Fuhrman claims it isn't his. The gang launches it away from Destroido, accidentally blowing up the avocado farm. Mr. E is revealed to have been behind the bomb, and he, Pericles, Brad, and Judy conspire to steal the disk pieces from the gang. Overarching Mystery Event: Mr. E is discovered to own Destroido. Villain: Scarebear/Benson Fuhrman (Hairmore) Notes: The Scarebear footage shown to Mystery, Inc. parodies the Patterson–Gimlin film. Fuhrman's voice is an impersonation of Christopher Walken. Fuhrman said he got his claws from "a school for gifted children". This is a reference to Wolverine and Professor X's school in Marvel's X-Men franchise. Jeff Bennett voices Mr. E in this episode due to Lewis Black being unavailable at the time.
39	13	"Wrath of the Krampus"	Curt Geda	Michael F. Ryan	August 15, 2012
Krampus is attacking children, leaving their hair snow-white. The gang investigates, realizing Krampus is attacking "bad kids". They head to the Roller Rink and Arcade, where Krampus attacks again. Meanwhile, Brad and Judy attempt to steal disk pieces from the gang. When the gang fails to trap Krampus, they enlist the help of Mary-Ann Gleardon to use a bait, only for Krampus to attack and kidnap her. The gang traps Krampus, revealing him to be a robot. Brad and Judy are successful in stealing the gang's disk pieces, only to return to Ricky's headquarters and find their disk pieces gone. A video from the gang reveals that they created Krampus with the help of Jason Wyatt so the original Mystery Inc. would think they had the perfect opportunity to steal the gang's disk pieces. Fred hid the real disk pieces with former Mayor Jones, while Brad and Judy stole replicas. Fred planted a bug on Brad to get Ricky's password, then Velma sent Hot Dog Water to steal Ricky's pieces while Ricky was focused on the gang and Krampus. The gang, who now has all pieces of the disk, assembles it. In the caves, the crystal sarcophagus emits the word "Nibiru". Overarching Mystery Event: Velma finds that the word "Nibiru" refers to an ancient Babylonian prophecy of a collision between Earth and a large planetary object known as "Planet X," whose inhabitants were the first recorded instances of gods. The gang steals Ricky's disk pieces and assembles the disk. Villain: Krampus/Charlie the Robot (controlled by Jason Wyatt on Mystery Incorporated's behalf) Notes: Besides Mary-Ann Gleardon, nearly all of the villains the gang has unmasked make cameo appearances in the prison, including Grady and Greta Gator, Alice May, Grandma Moonbeam, and Dan Fluunk. In the Haunted Museum, the Luna Ghost from the Scooby-Doo live-action film can be seen in the background as a statue. The Giggling Green Ghost from the Scooby-Doo, Where Are You! episode "A Night of Fright is No Delight" also makes a cameo appearance in the arcade game Sheriff Stone and Mayor Nettles are playing, which is a reference to The House of the Dead. Velma reads a description of the Nibiru cataclysm off of her "favorite internet encyclopedia." The description she reads is near word-for-word that of the Wikipedia article on the event.
40	14	"Heart of Evil"	Victor Cook	Jim Krieg	August 16, 2012
Five years ago, a gigantic dragon robot is seen attacking Quest Industries, leaving security guard Radley Crown's dog, Reggie, injured. Quest works to save the dog. In the present day, the same robot attacks the gang at City Hall. They're saved by Blue Falcon and Dynomutt, who have been tracking the robot for years. The two groups team up to stop the robot. They discover that Quest Industries is now owned by Destroido, and that the robot wants the Quest X Power Source, which was used to revive Dynomutt. The robot accidentally takes Scooby as he is wearing Dynomutt's belt, prompting the team to follow using a tracking device. They arrive on the island, where they defeat Dr. Zin, who wanted the Heart to save his daughter, and save Scooby. Overarching Mystery Event: Velma's primitive recorder, used on the Planispheric Disk, yields the word "Nibiru". Villains: Dragon Battle Suit (operated by Jenny Zin), Dr. Zin Notes: Blue Falcon is depicted in the artistic style of Frank Miller's Batman from The Dark Knight Returns. Some of his lines of dialogue are either direct quotes or homages owing to that work. Dr. Zin, Jenny and their henchman Bobo also function as references to Batman enemies Ra's al Ghul, Talia al Ghul, and Ubu. Ubu is Ra's al Ghul's chief henchman and Talia is frequently endangered by her father's schemes. Daphne saying that Fred is "living in a van down by the river" is a reference to SNL character Matt Foley. Velma's primitive recorder resembles the speak-n-spell phone-home transmitter from E.T. the Extra-Terrestrial. Dr. Zin is the primary villain from Hanna-Barbera's Jonny Quest. The gang had previously appeared with Blue Falcon in several episodes of the Dynomutt, Dog Wonder segment of The Scooby-Doo/Dynomutt Hour in 1976. Later in 2013, Blue Falcon and Dynomutt would feature prominently in the direct-to-DVD film Scooby-Doo! Mask of the Blue Falcon followed by appearing in 2020's Scoob!.
41	15	"Theater of Doom"	Curt Geda	Joe Flaherty & Paul Rugg	August 17, 2012
A production on the sinking of Crystal Cove is attacked by the ghost of Friar Gabriello Serra. Van Ghoul is called upon to revive the production, then calls the gang for assistance. The gang notices George Avocados working as a janitor and suspects him. With Shaggy and Scooby as the leads, the gang helps put on the play, only for the ghost to attack on opening night. The gang traps it, revealing Avocados to finally be the villain who was searching for the lost Avocados diamond. The real ghost of Serra suddenly appears and explains how he was part of the first mystery solving group, Fraternitas Mysterium, which became a victim of the disk and the curse. It was his donkey Porto who destroyed them all, causing the settlement to sink. Serra warns them of Nibiru, then repeats the warning "the dog dies", as it is the animal mascot who led his group to downfall. Overarching Mystery Events: It is revealed that Serra's corrupted donkey Porto sent the original Crystal Cove settlement into the ocean, not an earthquake as was originally believed. Serra's ghost warns the gang about evoking the memory of "Nibiru". Serra's statement of "Heed the warning of the alligators" is a reference to the hotel sign in Gatorsburg reading "The dog dies!" in "The Creeping Creatures". Villain: Ghost of Friar Serra/George Avocados Note: Upon his capture, George Avocados reveals that the crystal which the Ghost Trucker was seeking in "The Secret of the Ghost Rig" was actually disguised as a doorknob in the Burlington Library, and belonged to the Avocados family. As Vincent Van Ghoul begins the production in front of the audience, he performs an homage to Vincent Price's part in Michael Jackson's Thriller.
42	16	"Aliens Among Us"	Victor Cook	Erin Maher & Kathryn Reindl	March 25, 2013
As the gang makes progress on the disk, Stone recalls a childhood event where he was abducted by aliens. The gang begins investigating, when three real aliens begin stealing valuable items from Crystal Cove. Velma realizes that the statures of the three aliens resemble the statures of three wanted individuals listed in the police station. The gang traps the aliens, revealed to be the wanted thieves using alien disguises, and returns to the disk to find it has given them coordinates to a cemetery in Gatorsburg. At the cemetery, they find an old flintlock. When they return to Crystal Cove, they find their office ablaze. Brad and Judy, implied to be the arsonists, watch from afar. Overarching Mystery Events: Velma's primitive recorder, used on the Planispheric Disk, yields the phrase "Señor P. Llave", and the coordinates to the Gatorsburg cemetery; upon reaching Señor Llave's grave, the gang finds it empty, with only an old flintlock left in it. Velma realizes the flintlock is the "first key". At the request of Pericles, Brad and Judy have destroyed the gang's office. Villains: Grey Alien/Traveler O'Flaherty, Nordic Alien/Sheela O'Flaherty, Reptoid/Connor O'Flaherty Note: The coordinates for the Gatorsburg cemetery are coordinates for a Warner Bros. studio in real life. Also, the coordinates to the Gatorsburg cemetery allude to Mr. E's note in "The Creeping Creatures" stating that Gatorsburg was "one piece of the puzzle". The scene where the Mystery Machine breaks down is an homage to Close Encounters of the Third Kind, while the cornfield sequence is an homage to Signs. The lines about a group of reptilian creatures living in the center of the Earth may be a reference to the Silurians from Doctor Who. When Velma visits Stone at the station, the O'Flaherty's wanted poster is visible.
43	17	"The Horrible Herd"	Curt Geda	Michael F. Ryan	March 25, 2013
Professor Pericles creates a herd of mutant cattle (which he had bred from cattle, piranhas, and bees) to destroy Crystal Cove in an attempt to locate the Planispheric Disk. As the herd begins devouring the town, the gang, Mayor Nettles, and Sheriff Stone use Ex-Mayor Jones' helicopter to trap the herd's queen. The cattle follow the gang as they leave town in an attempt to protect their queen. Watching from afar, Professor Pericles orders Brad and Judy to shoot the helicopter down. The missile strikes the chopper and as Mayor Nettles attempts to land safely, Nova falls out and is nearly trampled to death by the herd. The queen cattle is dropped into the ocean as the herd scatters. Scooby-Doo then has everyone get Nova to the hospital. Villains: Skull Cattle (created by Professor Pericles) Note: The farmer attacked by the Skull Cattle at the beginning of the episode is the same farmer who held Scooby captive at the pound in "The Night the Clown Cried", which is why the two reacted to each other's presence with hostility. Nova's fall from the helicopter is animated in a similar fashion to Mufasa's fall in The Lion King. The queen of the Skull Cattle is based on the alien queen from Aliens.
44	18	"Dance of the Undead"	Curt Geda	Benjamin Townsend	March 26, 2013
Deceased ska band Rude Boy and the Skatastics returns from the grave and hypnotizes partygoers at a local nightclub to dance to their music. The dancers are taken to the hospital, whereupon the gang is called to solve the mystery before they dance themselves to death. Meanwhile, since her accident with the herd, Scooby has been visiting Nova regularly in the hospital. Eventually, the band hypnotizes Fred and the girls, forcing Scooby and Shaggy, who are immune to the music, to turn to the Hex Girls for help. They work together to fight off the band in a giant supernatural band battle, ending with the Skatastics' defeat. They are revealed to be the actual Rude Boy and the Skatastics, who faked their deaths in order to make a huge comeback and wanted to revive ska by using hypnotic music. The Hex Girls help decipher a clue on the Planispheric Disk that leads them to an old helmet. Meanwhile, Scooby visits Nova in the hospital, only for her to awaken and utter a cryptic warning before falling back asleep. Overarching Mystery Events: The gang discovers a musical phrase that has appeared on the Planispheric Disk. When the Hex Girls sing the phrase, the Disk reveals another set of coordinates, which leads the gang to the Clam Cabin. They find that Skipper Shelton's hat (given to him by Handsome Jimmy from "Night on Haunted Mountain") bears the name "S. Llave" written under the brim, which they discover is the second key. Scooby visits Nova in the hospital, only to see her flatline. Just afterward, she sits up in bed and says "Nibiru. Nibiru is coming", before regaining life. Villains: Ska Zombies/Rude Boy and the Ska-Tastics Notes: This is the second appearance of the Hex Girls, who have converted back to their original outfits as seen in Scooby-Doo! and the Witch's Ghost. The song "Who Do Voodoo?" from Scooby-Doo! and the Legend of the Vampire is featured in this episode. The song "Stuck in My Throat" is also heard once more, as it was last featured in "Battle of the Humungonauts". This episode shows many similarities to Scooby-Doo! and the Legend of the Vampire; both have a band that has disappeared, and musicians being kidnapped. Martha Quinn plays herself, as the owner of Grooves from the Grave. The battle between the Ska Zombies and the Hex Girls is reminiscent of a scene in Scott Pilgrim vs. the World, where the music from two rival bands generates monsters that start fighting each other; the winning monster wins the music competition. Music for Rude Boy and the Ska-Tastics was written and performed by Dave Wakeling of The English Beat. Cass Elliot is one of the dancing people at the Tiki Tub.
45	19	"The Devouring"	Victor Cook	Michael F. Ryan	March 27, 2013
A gluttonous monster attacks and eats Francilee Jackson on her cooking show. As the gang attempts to eat dinner together, the restaurant is crashed by Rick Spartan and Cachinga, who are on the hunt for the monster. The monster attacks various locations around Crystal Cove, including various restaurants and the museum where Velma's mom works. Fred and Spartan build a trap for the demon, Scooby and Shaggy work to eat all the food in town to lure the demon into the trap, and Velma, Daphne, and Cachinga actually investigate the mystery. They discover the monster to be Francilee Jackson, who was removing the competition to open her own restaurant. Meanwhile, Professor Pericles has gone crazy, leaving Mr. E to attempt to seek the treasure without him. Brad and Judy tell Pericles of E's mutiny, and Pericles uses venom injections from cobra larvae placed in Mr. E's spine to force Mr. E to work for him. Overarching Mystery Events: Francilee Jackson drops her bowl as she is escorted away, and the bowl is revealed to bear the words "Tercero Llave" on its underside. Villain: Gluten Demon/Francilee Jackson Note: This is the second appearance of Francilee Jackson, as she last appeared in the episode "Web of the Dreamweaver!", where she was also a suspect. This is also the second appearance of Rick Spartan and Cachinga, who both last appeared in the episode "Attack of the Headless Horror".
46	20	"Stand and Deliver"	Victor Cook	Caroline Farah	March 28, 2013
A family vacationing in the mountains near Crystal Cove is attacked by a masked Englishman calling himself the Dandy Highwayman, who blows up the family's station wagon and leaves with the mother. Later, the gang stumbles upon the wreckage of several cars on the mountain roads and decides to investigate. As they investigate, the Highwayman kidnaps several women from around Crystal Cove, including Mayor Nettles, Daphne, and Mrs. Blake, and steals all of the money from the Blake safe. With inside help from Daphne (who is safe and sound in the Highwayman's lair), the gang traps the Highwayman, revealed to be a lonely librarian who wanted to have a more exciting and adventurous life. Overarching Mystery Events: While the gang is researching the Dandy Highwayman in the town library, Scooby awakes from another nightmare and knocks the book he is reading off of the table, dislodging a piece of cloth from within the book which bears the words "Cuarto Llave" written on it. Scooby has been having nightmares since Nova's accident. In Scooby's latest nightmare, a being speaking through Nova warns him of the coming of the Anunnaki at the time of Nibiru and warns him that his life is in danger, telling him that he and his friends must destroy the cursed treasure beneath Crystal Cove. Scooby then informs his friends about his dream. Villain: Dandy Highwayman/Crystal Cove Librarian Note: The family traveling on the Crystal Cove highway is the same family that was vacationing in the episodes "Night Terrors" and "The Creeping Creatures". Also, Scooby's first dream is a reference to the dream sequence from An American Werewolf in London and the second dream is a reference to Twin Peaks. The Dandy Highwayman character is an homage to the Monty Python character Dennis Moore; a robber who uses the line "Stand and Deliver," two pistols, and a three-pointed hat when holding up his victims. "I'm the Dandy Highwayman" are the opening lyrics of the Adam and the Ants song, "Stand and Deliver", the group's most successful single. On the sleeve to the single, Adam Ant is seen dressed similarly: three-pointed hat, cape, white vest, and two pistols.
47	21	"The Man in the Mirror"	Curt Geda	Jim Krieg	March 29, 2013
As the gang investigates a haunted house, a man resembling Fred pulls him through a mirror and takes him to a world where the Planispheric Disk destroyed all of Crystal Cove. In the real world, the Fred impostor leads the gang on a wild goose chase, causing the gang to suspect something is amiss. The real Fred encounters an aged Daphne, but realizes the entire thing is a ruse and escapes from the fake town, reuniting with the gang. The Freds fight over the Planispheric Disk, and the fake Fred and Daphne are revealed to be a surgically-altered Brad and Judy, working with Professor Pericles to obtain the disc. Pericles uses the Kriegstaffelbots to threaten Daphne in order for the Planispheric Disk to be surrendered to him. When Professor Pericles gets the Planispheric Disk, he makes plans to free his "master". Overarching Mystery Events: Professor Pericles appears to be serving the Evil Entity sealed within the crystal sarcophagus, and has been on a mission to gain access to the Planispheric Disk to set the being free. Villains: Fake Fred/Brad Chiles, Fake Daphne/Judy Reeves, Kriegstaffelbots Note: The apocalyptic setting in the mirror world parodies the 1984 horror classic Night of the Comet.
48	22	"Nightmare in Red"	Victor Cook	Michael F. Ryan	April 2, 2013
When a monstrous version of the Freak of Crystal Cove begins appearing in Scooby's nightmares, the gang decides to investigate what is going on. They seek the help of the reclusive hypnotist Professor Horatio Kharon (author of the book Velma has been reading), who has also been seeing the Freak within his dreams as well as appearing in Scooby's. After being hypnotized to enter the dream world, the gang is chased by the Monstrous Freak throughout the dimension. They soon discover the Evil Entity that was trapped with the cursed treasure, and how previous mystery groups and the people affiliated with the treasure have been manipulated by the entity. The gang traps the monstrous Freak, revealed to be El Aguirre, who wished for him and his men to remain cursed as punishment for their deeds. The being speaking through Nova tells Mystery Incorporated that they must find the Heart of the Jaguar to destroy the Evil Entity sealed within the crystal sarcophagus. Overarching Mystery Events: The good personality components of all members of previous mystery groups and the people associated with the cursed treasure (among them ex-Mayor Fred Jones Sr., Ed Machine, Cassidy Williams, Ricky Owens, Brad Chiles, and Judy Reeves) were sent to the dream dimension where they remained to stay. The first mystery group, the Hunters of Secrets, was first manipulated by the entity within the sarcophagus; however, they were pure and realized they were being manipulated. They attempted to destroy the entity with a relic referred to as the "Heart of the Jaguar", but never succeeded due to the conquistadors' interruption. The Keys are being used by previous mystery groups (such as the Darrow Family, the Alianza Mysterio, the Fraternitas Mysterium, the Mystery Gang, and the Benevolent Lodge of Mystery) when the gang visits them in the dream world, symbolizing their use with the gates to the cursed treasure. If they destroy the entity, everyone from the dream world would be set free from the curse. Villain: Monstrous Freak/The Ghost of Fernando El Aguirre Note: This episode parodies the A Nightmare on Elm Street franchise; in this episode, if the gang had gotten trapped, they would never wake up, while in the films, if the character Freddy Krueger killed the kids in their dreams they would die for real. The room with red curtains is almost identical to the one from Twin Peaks. The "dancing" Horatio Kharon resembles The Man from Another Place from Twin Peaks, and is voiced by the actor who played that role in the series, Michael J. Anderson. The house in which Horatio Kharon lives resembles the one in the original Scooby-Doo, Where Are You? season one opening from 1969.
49	23	"Dark Night of the Hunters"	Michael Goguen	Benjamin Townsend	April 3, 2013
The gang, accompanied by Velma's mom, Angie, goes to the Yucatán in an attempt to search for the Heart of the Jaguar after Angie's old friend, Professor Enrique Andelusossa, is "consumed by the jungle" near the Temple of the Hunters (the burial site of the Hunters of Secrets where the Heart of the Jaguar is kept). Upon arriving in the Yucatán, the gang visits Professor Enrique's antique shop, where they are greeted by his angry wife, who says Angie is to blame for his disappearance. After hours, the gang returns to the store, only to be attacked by a Mayan Priestess, who warns them away from the temple. The gang ignores her threat and travels into the jungle to find the temple. Due to Fred's master trap skills, Mystery Incorporated overcomes the temple's diabolical traps and discovers the Heart of the Jaguar in the tomb. The Priestess attacks but is captured by the temple's traps. She is revealed to be Andelusossa, who wished for Angie to return. Afterward, Lieutenant Tomina Kasanski (a woman who had been spying on the gang) appears but is revealed to be working with Mayor Nettles. Overarching Mystery Events: The gang finds the Heart of the Jaguar, the spear used by the Hunters of Secrets that is able to destroy the Evil Entity. Mayor Nettles had a nightmare telling her that the gang would need her help in transporting the Heart of the Jaguar back to Crystal Cove. Villain: Mayan Priestess/Professor Enrique Andelusossa Note: The Mayan Priestess attacks her victims with a vicious, flowering, sentient plant, an homage to the creature in The Ruins. The traps throughout the episode are an homage to the Indiana Jones franchise, with the blow darts and crushing walls from Raiders of the Lost Ark, and the "breath activated" buzz saw trap from Indiana Jones and the Last Crusade. Lieutenant Tomina Kasanski is an homage to LT Tom "Iceman" Kazansky, Val Kilmer's character from the film Top Gun.
50	24	"Gates of Gloom"	Victor Cook	Caroline Farah	April 4, 2013
Once the gang returns to Crystal Cove, they find out that everyone in town has disappeared below ground. Later, after witnessing Mayor Nettles and Sheriff Stone vanish, the gang goes to Fred's house to discuss the Planispheric Disc, Nibiru, the cursed treasure, and an upcoming planetary alignment. After the interruption of Kriegstaffelbots, the gang sets off beneath Crystal Cove and discovers everyone in town forced to work for Professor Pericles and the rest of the original Mystery Incorporated. After hearing a conversation between the old Mystery, Inc., the gang is convinced they have gone crazy, and devise a tactical plan to bust everyone out and shut down the operation. Shaggy and Scooby go undercover as Kriegstaffelbots, while Fred and the girls attack in a suited-up Mystery Machine. After the word is spread, Sheriff Stone has everyone rebel against the Kriegstaffelbots and go on a riot. Soon, the Kriegstaffelbots stop Fred, Velma, and Daphne in their tracks, forcing them to blow up the Mystery Machine (in which everyone thought they were). After all is resolved and the doorway is opened to the cursed treasure, the gang gears up with the relics and follows the original Mystery Incorporated into the caverns. Overarching Mystery Events: The passageway to the cursed treasure is found and opened. Professor Pericles confirms Cassidy's death to a troubled Mr. E, who is worried about her and is saying she was right the entire time. Velma's computer model of the Planispheric Disc perfectly mirrors the planets in the solar system. The planets are coming into direct alignment and will cause massive gravitational disruption, one not seen in 5,000 years. The time of Nibiru happens in two days. The gravitational disruption makes the fabric between dimensions of time and space weak, which is why the evil entity buried beneath Crystal Cove must be destroyed. Along with destroying the entity, the Heart of the Jaguar will undo all of its evil. Villains: Professor Pericles, Brad Chiles, Judy Reeves, Mr. E, and the Kriegstaffelbots Note: Before the interruption of the Kriegstaffelbots, the mysterious being burrowing and sucking its victims into the ground is an homage to the film Tremors; the monster in that film being a subterranean worm that hunts based on sound and movement. Brad and Judy still resemble Fred and Daphne since "The Man in the Mirror", since Professor Pericles will not allow time for the reversal procedure. The destruction of the Mystery Machine is similar to the destruction of the Enterprise in Star Trek III: The Search for Spock. The dialogue was a direct homage to that scene.
51	25	"Through the Curtain"	Michael Goguen	Michael F. Ryan	April 5, 2013
As the gang follows the original Mystery, Inc. through the caverns, they all approach the first gate to the cursed treasure. Professor Pericles knows the gang has been following them, as he calls them out to bring the Keys to open the gates. The gang realizes that the Keys and their scenarios seen in the dream world is how they all apply to the gates. The gang is forced to cooperate after Pericles reveals they have Hot Dog Water. Fred uses a trap built into the gate to distract Pericles, and Hot Dog Water captures him to buy the gang time to escape, although she is killed by the Kriegstaffelbots shortly after. The gang arrives at the second gate and opens it using the mortar bowl. They enter a mysterious rock dimension, where they are greeted and chased by a Rock Monster. After the monster's defeat, the gang comes before the third gate, which is opened using the conquistador's helmet. The gate releases water trapped behind, and the gate turns into a boat, allowing the gang to escape and become stranded at sea. After learning that the next gate is below the water, the gang comes upon the final gate, which is opened using the flintlock. The gang enters the dimension, which is teeming with lava, and comes upon the crystal sarcophagus and cursed treasure. The Evil Entity sealed within tries to manipulate the gang into opening the sarcophagus to free it, but the gang realizes the words the being is speaking are not true. Suddenly, Pericles and the original Mystery Incorporated arrive and Pericles opens the sarcophagus, releasing the Evil Entity. Overarching Mystery Event: The Evil Entity is released from its imprisonment. It tells the gang that it brought them together as it brought together those groups before them, solely for the purpose of releasing it; the gang realizes that everything the Entity is saying is untrue. Villains: Professor Pericles, Mr. E, Brad Chiles, Judy Reeves, Kriegstaffelbots, Rock Monster, Evil Entity Note: When Scooby-Doo and Shaggy are running down the side of the mountain away from the Rock Monster, their animations are exactly like their classic run cycle animations seen in Scooby-Doo, Where Are You!.
52	26	"Come Undone"	Victor Cook	Michael F. Ryan	April 5, 2013
The gang and original Mystery Incorporated stand before the Evil Entity. The Entity grabs Scooby-Doo and mentions that he must die and be reborn as a vessel for its darkness. Scooby breaks free, but Pericles tells the Entity to forget about possessing Scooby and volunteers himself to be possessed by the being instead, to which the Entity agrees. Professor Pericles believes he has gained ultimate power, but the Evil Entity kills Pericles and mutates him into a squid-like monster. The Entity then consumes Brad and Judy and assumes control of the Kriegstaffelbots before consuming Mr. E and summoning other evil Anunnaki, who offer the townspeople for the Entity to consume. Scooby tries using the spear on the entity, but it shatters. The gang realizes that their friendship is the Heart of the Jaguar and work together to get close to the sarcophagus. When Scooby destroys the sarcophagus, a vortex opens which sucks in and destroys the Entity, his minions, and much of the rest of Crystal Cove. The gang awakens to find themselves in a new version of Crystal Cove and Earth itself. After some strange encounters, Mystery Incorporated realizes that all the evil caused by the Entity has come undone, thereby changing history. The gang sets up a new Mystery Machine and travels off to Miskatonic University after receiving a message from Harlan Ellison, who is the new Mr. E and still remembers the previous timeline. The gang vows to solve each mystery they come across. As the gang drives away, they are watched by Nova, who says Scooby is the bravest dog that ever lived and thanks him and the gang. Overarching Mystery Events: The overall mystery is solved. By destroying the Evil Entity, the gang created an entirely different timeline where its influence is gone, everyone lives productive and normal lives, and Cassidy, Hot Dog Water, Brad, Judy, Pericles, and Ricky are alive. Harlan Ellison, who is now called Mr. E, contacts the gang and tells them he knows who they are. He knows that they created an alternate timeline by destroying the Evil Entity, due to being a genius and having hyper-tuned psychic and hypnotic connections with alternate dimensions, which is why he is able to remember every timeline ever created. He also mentions that the gang has slipped the timestream with him. He has admitted the gang (including Scooby) at Miskatonic University to be in his class next semester and he mentions there is a lot of "meddling" to do and a lot of mysteries to be solved. Villains: Evil Entity, Kriegstaffelbots, the Entity's Anunnaki minions Notes: This episode is the second appearance of Harlan Ellison, who was last seen in "The Shrieking Madness". When the gang is running away from the Anunnaki, their animations are similar to their classic run cycle animations seen in Scooby-Doo, Where Are You!. The gestures the gang makes upon returning to Crystal Cove are the same gestures they made at the beginning of "Beware the Beast from Below". A laugh track followed by applause is featured when the gang is driving off at the end of the episode. The end credits feature the opening theme and a background resembling the paint job of the Mystery Machine.
