= Acephaly =

Acephaly (in Greek: a = without / képhalê = head) is a term used to define:

- In medicine:
  - in forensic medicine: a decapitated corpse whose head has not been found
  - Twin reversed arterial perfusion
- an animal without a head. For example:
  - Great scallop
  - Maggot, the larva of the fly
- a relatively complete sculpture, the head of which has not been found. For example:
  - Winged Victory of Samothrace
  - Venus of Arles
  - Commons:Category:Headless statues
