= Anthropophage =

Mythical race of cannibals described by Shakespeare

An anthropophage or anthropophagus (from Greek: ανθρωποφάγος, romanized: anthrōpophagos, "human-eater", plural Greek: ανθρωποφάγοι, romanized: anthropophagi) was a member of a mythical race of cannibals described by the playwright William Shakespeare. The word first appears in English after 1460.

== Origin ==
The Anthropophagi might have been inspired by the Scythian tribe of the Androphagi described by the Ancient Greek author Herodotus of Halicarnassus.

Ephraim Chambers' Cyclopædia says "Many, some say most, of the Savages are Anthropophagi."

== In literature ==
The most famous usage of the Anthropophagi appears in William Shakespeare's Othello:

And of the Cannibals that each other eat,
The Anthropophagi, and men whose heads
Do grow beneath their shoulders.

Shakespeare makes another reference to the cannibalist anthropophagus in the Merry Wives of Windsor:

Go knock and call; hell speak like an Anthropophaginian
unto thee: knock, I say.

T.H. White also features the Anthropophagi as Robin Hood's enemies in his novel The Sword in the Stone:

You know about these Anthropophagi, and how we have lost Matthew, Peter, Walter, Colin and many more

American novelist Rick Yancey incorporates the myths of the Anthropophagi in his 2010 release The Monstrumologist.

== Pop culture ==
In popular culture, the anthropophagus is sometimes depicted as a being without a head, but instead have their faces on the torso. This may be a misinterpretation based on Shakespeare's writings in Othello, where the anthropophagi are mistaken to be described by the immediate following line, "and men whose heads do grow beneath their shoulders". In reality, the line actually refers to a separate, different race of mythical beings known as the Blemmyes, who are indeed said to have no head, and have their facial features on the chest.

== See also ==
- Headless men
