= Solomon and Saturn =

Old English poem

Start of the Prose Solomon and Saturn in the Southwick Codex

Solomon and Saturn is the generic name given to four Old English works, which present a dialogue of riddles between Solomon, the king of Israel, and Saturn, identified in two of the poems as a prince of the Chaldeans.

On account of earlier editorial tendencies, the two poetical works, Solomon and Saturn I and Solomon and Saturn II, have often been read as a single, continuous poem. They are considered to be among the most enigmatic and difficult poems in the Old English corpus.

== The Prose Solomon and Saturn ==
The Prose Solomon and Saturn in the Southwick Codex (the Beowulf manuscript) is a question-and-answer text dealing chiefly with issues of biblical or Christian lore. It has many similarities to a later Old English prose dialogue, Adrian and Ritheus and, later still, the Middle English Master of Oxford's Catechism.

The Prose Solomon and Saturn has as one of its riddles: "Who invented letters? Mercurius the giant." The Anglo-Saxons routinely identified Mercury with Woden (known in Old Norse as Óðinn, and widely today as Odin), who gave his name to Wednesday.

== Poetic versions ==
Solomon and Saturn I, Solomon and Saturn II, and the Pater Noster Solomon and Saturn in MS Cambridge, Corpus Christi College (CCCC) 422 are often compared to the Vafþrúðnismál and Alvíssmál and other similar poems in the Old Norse Poetic Edda.

=== Date ===
As with most Old English poetry, the Solomon and Saturn poems have proved to be very difficult to date. Patrick O'Neill has argued for a connection to the court of Alfred the Great (reigned 871–899), but Daniel Anlezark sees the poem as fitting into the cultural milieu of Dunstan's Glastonbury in the mid-tenth century.

The Solomon and Saturn texts are often considered the earliest examples of a broader European literary tradition of Solomonic dialogues. These include the comparatively later dialogues of Solomon and Marcolf, which are attested in a number of European languages.

=== Solomon and Saturn I ===
Solomon and Saturn I is one of the few Old English poems to survive in more than one manuscript. It appears in MS CCCC 41 and MS CCCC 422.

=== Solomon and Saturn II ===
Solomon and Saturn II, which is often regarded as having more aesthetic merit, contains a number of riddles, including two of the most obscure passages in Old English literature, the Weallande Wulf and Vasa Mortis riddles.

==== Weallende Wulf ====
Saturn's first riddle describes a dragonslayer named Wulf and the wasteland that arises after his death. The poem's earlier editor, Robert Menner, argued that the weallende Wulf passage stems from ancient Hebrew legends regarding Nimrod and the builders of the Tower of Babel. He interprets Wulf as the Babylonian god Bel, who is connected with Saturn in Isidore's Etymologies. Andy Orchard has found similarities between Wulf and Beowulf. Daniel Anlezark has argued that the passage participates in an "Avernian tradition" that describes impassable wastelands of ancient history. Tristan Major has suggested that the passage is a conflation of biblical and classic material, and that Wulf is to be identified with the mythological Perseus.

==== Vasa Mortis ====
The riddle describes a mysterious bird that has been bound by Solomon until Doomsday and is feared by the leaders of the Philistines. The final line of the passage names the bird as Vasa Mortis. Robert Menner has argued that ancient Jewish legends of Solomon's struggles with demons are at the heart of the riddle, and he identifies the Vasa Mortis with the demon Asmodeus. Cilluffo sees parallels between the Vasa Mortis and the description of Fame in Virgil's Aeneid, as well as the nocturnal monster in the Anglo-Saxon Liber Monstrorum and the griffin in the Wonders of the East.

=== Themes ===
Kathryn Powell has described these poetic versions as examples of "orientalist fantasy", which works to suppress anxieties about English cultural identity. She argues that they attempt to minimise anxieties about the unstable condition of knowledge, and about the future of the Anglo-Saxon kingdoms and the Christian faith, by "displacing any lack of knowledge, political stability or faith onto the Eastern and pagan figure of Saturn and the Chaldean people he represents". Powell suggests that the dialogues' original readers were encouraged to identify with the figure of Solomon, who is constructed as a model of Christian ideals and behaviour.

== Bibliography ==
=== Editions ===
- Anlezark, Daniel, The Old English Dialogues of Solomon and Saturn, Anglo-Saxon Texts 7, Cambridge, 2009
- Cross, James E., and Hill, Thomas D., The 'Prose Solomon and Saturn' and 'Adrian and Ritheus', Toronto, 1982
- Dobbie, Elliott van Kirk, Anglo-Saxon Minor Poems, Anglo-Saxon Poetic Records 6, New York, 1942
- Foys, Martin et al., Old English Poetry in Facsimile Project, Madison, 2019
- Kemble, John M., The Dialogue of Salomon and Saturnus, London, 1848
- Menner, R.J., The Poetical Dialogues of Solomon and Saturn, MLA Monograph Series 13, New York, 1941

=== Scholarship ===
- Anlezark, Daniel, "Poisoned Places: The Avernian Tradition in Old English Poetry." Anglo-Saxon England 36 (2007) 103–126
- Cilluffo, Gilda, "Mirabilia ags.: il Vasa Mortis nel Salomone e Saturno." Annali Istituto Universitario Orientale di Napoli Filologia germanica 24 (1981): 211–226
- Dane, Joseph A., "The Structure of the Old English 'Solomon and Saturn II'." Neophilologus 64.4 (1980) 592–603
- Major, Tristan, "Saturn’s First Riddle in Solomon and Saturn II: An Orientalist Conflation." Neophilologus 96 (2012) 301-313
- Menner, R.J., "The Vasa Mortis Passage in the Old English 'Salomon and Saturn'." Studies in English Philology in Honor of F. Klaeber. Minneapolis, 1929.
- Menner, R.J., "Nimrod and the Wolf in the Old English Solomon and Saturn." JEGP 37 (1938) 332–54
- Nelson, Marie, "King Solomon's Magic: The Power of a Written Text." Oral Tradition 5 (1990) 20–36
- O'Brien O'Keeffe, Katherine, Visible Song: Transitional Literacy in Old English Verse. Cambridge Studies in Anglo-Saxon England 4. Cambridge: Cambridge University Press, 1990
- O'Brien O'Keeffe, Katherine, "The Geographic List of Solomon and Saturn II." Anglo-Saxon England 20 (1991) 123–42
- O'Neill, Patrick, "On the Date, Provenance and Relationship of the ‘Solomon and Saturn’ Dialogues." Anglo-Saxon England 26 (1997: 139-168
- Orchard, Andy, Pride and Prodigies: Studies in the Monsters of the Beowulf Manuscript. Cambridge: D.S. Brewer, 1994
- Paz, James, "Magic That Works: Performing Scientia in the Old English Metrical Charms and Poetic Dialogues of Solomon and Saturn." JMEMS 45.2 (2015) 219–43
- Powell, Kathryn, "Orientalist Fantasy in the Poetic Dialogues of Solomon and Saturn." Anglo-Saxon England 34 (2005) 117–143
- Shippey, T.A., Poems of Wisdom and Learning in Old English. Cambridge: D.S. Brewer, 1976
- Vincenti, A.R. von, Die altenglischen Dialogue von Salomon und Saturn mit historische Einleitung, Kommentar und Glossar. Leipzig: Deichert, 1904
