= Jannes and Jambres =

Magicians mentioned in the Book of Exodus

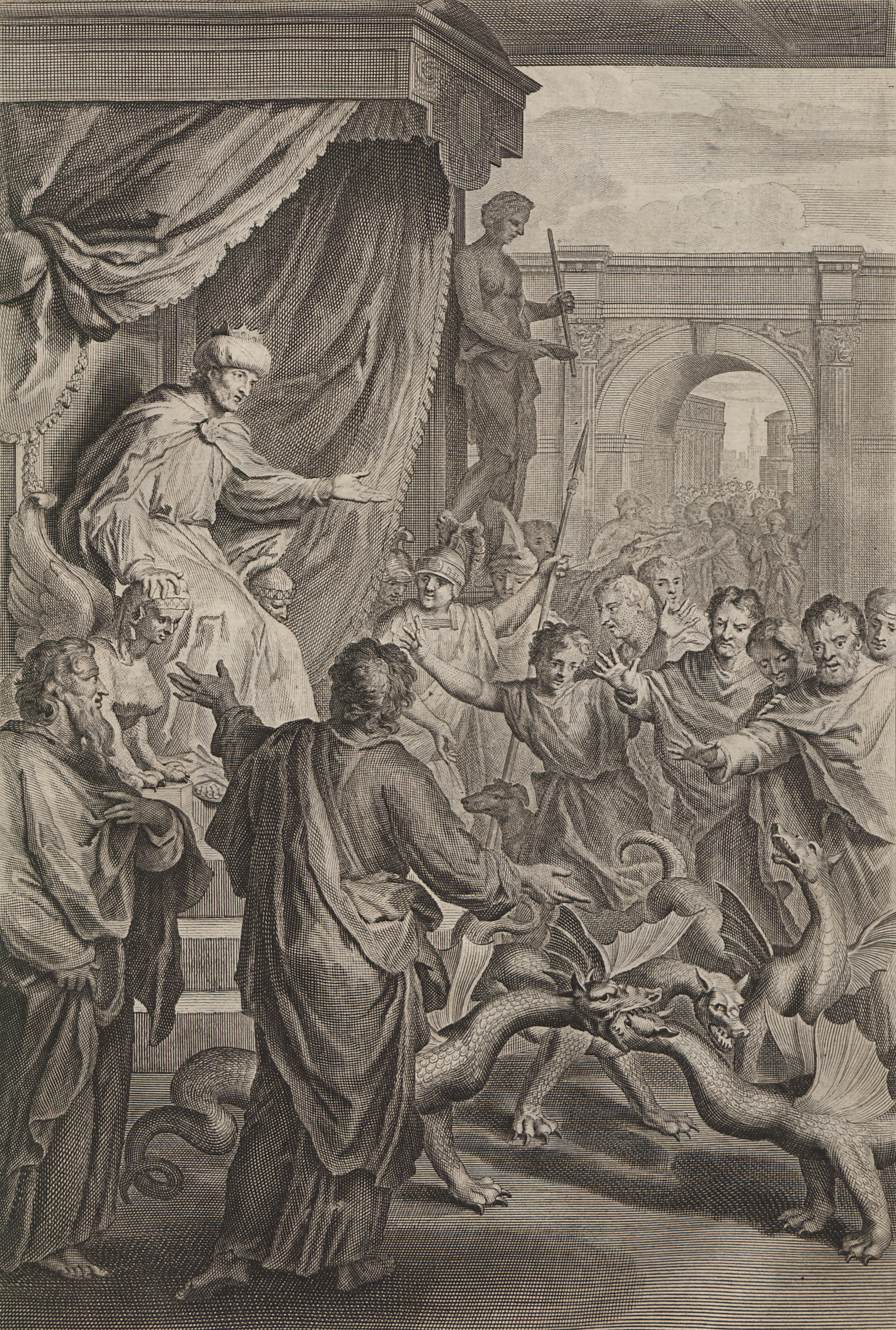
Illustration of the rods of Aaron and of the "wise men and sorcerers" becoming snakes, 1728, by Gerard Hoet.

In Jewish and Christian traditions, Jannes and Jambres (Hebrew: יניס Yannis or Yannes, ימבריס Yambres) are the names given to magicians mentioned in the Book of Exodus. This naming tradition is well-attested in ancient and medieval literature. In Latin manuscripts of the New Testament, and in Latin writing traditions, their names are known as Jamnes and Mambres.

== Hebrew Bible ==
Jannes and Jambres are not specifically mentioned in the Tanakh ("Hebrew Bible"), but the Egyptian "wise men and sorcerers" (two of whom were identified with Jannes and Jambres in Jewish and Christian traditions) are mentioned in Exodus 7:10-12 (KJV)

And Moses and Aaron went in unto Pharaoh, and they did so as the LORD had commanded: and Aaron cast down his rod before Pharaoh, and before his servants, and it became a serpent. Then Pharaoh also called the wise men and the sorcerers: now the magicians of Egypt, they also did in like manner with their enchantments. For they cast down every man his rod, and they became serpents: but Aaron's rod swallowed up their rods.

== New Testament and Second Temple literature ==
The names Jannes and Jambres (Greek: Ἰάννης, Ἰαμβρῆς; Iannēs, Iambrēs) appear in 2 Timothy in the New Testament. Origen says that there was an apocryphal book called The Book of Jannes and Jambres, containing details of their exploits, and that Paul the Apostle was quoting from it. This book, known as The Apocryphon of Jannes and Jambres the magicians, exists in some Greek fragments present in the Chester Beatty Papyri No XVI (which has been edited and translated by Albert Pietersma), and in an extensive Ethiopic fragment which was discovered in 2014. It was also probably known to the Qumran community, since the Qumran community refers to one of the magicians by the name of Jannes. The Testament of Solomon also refers to the magicians by the name of Jannes and Jambres.

According to Albert Pietersma, the text represents inner Jewish conflicts from the 2nd to 1st centuries BCE. The Jannes and Jamres tradition is maybe traced to Yohanon and his brother mentioned in Qumran 5:17b-19. The Qumran community had an enemy referred to as the "wicked priest", who may have been identified with Jonathan ben Mattathias (and his brother Simon). This would then make the names an analogy for false Israelite priests.

Richard Bauckman believed the Apocryphon of Jannes and Jambres influenced the tale of Lazarus and the rich man.

== Greco-Roman literature ==
The name of Jannes not as that of a magical opponent of Moses, but as the originator of a branch of magic alongside Moses and Lotapea (or Lotapes), occurs in Pliny the Elder's Natural History (XXX, II, 11), where they are grouped together as a sect of magicians and are seen as coming after Zoroaster; Pliny's citation is also referred to in Apuleius, with Moses being mentioned with other sorcerers such as Carmendas, Damigeron, Apollobex, and Dardanus. Numenius of Apamea, a Neopythagorean philosopher, refers to Jannes and Jambres as sacred Egyptian scribes.

The Gospel of Nicodemus also refers to the magicians by the name of Jannes and Jambres. They are also mentioned and named in the Passion of Peter and Paul.

In a brief passage cited in Eusebius' Praeparatio evangelica, Numenius said that "Jannes and Jambres were able to undo, publicly, even the greatest of the disasters that Moses brought against Egypt." This statement contradicts the biblical account according to which the magicians were able to follow Moses' acts only to the second plague inclusive (Ex 8:18).

== Rabbinic literature ==
The Babylonian Talmud names "Johana and Mamre" as two of Pharaoh's sorcerers. "Jannis and Jambres" are mentioned several times by name in Targum Pseudo-Jonathan. Jewish traditions in the Targums preserve other legendary lore about the pair. They are called the sons of Balaam, the unwitting non-Jewish prophet of Peor. It was also claimed that they converted to Judaism, and that they left Egypt at the Exodus to accompany Moses and the Israelites; however, they perished on the way, either at the Red Sea, or the destruction of the Golden Calf, or at the slaughter of Korah and his followers.

Apart from their opposition to Moses there are other aggadic lore and legends about Egyptian sorcerers; it was said that during the end of their days they had necessary occult knowledge to embark on a journey to the Jewish world to come. They were not welcomed and the angels of the first few heavens fought them vigorously but they could not evict them due to the potent talismans that were worn by the wizards. As they entered the fourth heaven they were met by Michael and Gabriel; legends say that the battle was very evenly balanced, but in the end it was the angels who had to fall back. Upon entering the fifth heaven they were met by none other than Metatron, who did not come at them with defiance or anger, but appeared accommodating, considering the circumstances; after conversing for a short time the angel was successful in convincing Jannes and Jambres to remove their talismans, leaving them thus vulnerable. Metatron was quick to act and threw them out of heaven with a wave of his hand. It is said that they lost all memory of the event after that.

== League with the Devil ==
The earliest mention of "Jannes and his brother" is in the Damascus Document, which states that the two were in league with "Belial", who would later be personified as the devil in Christian texts. In the Testament of Solomon, a demon who has some connections with "the Red Sea" replies to the king: "I am who was called upon by Jannes and Jambres who fought against Moses in Egypt" (25:4). Similarly, in the later text of the Questions of St. Bartholomew (6th-7th century), Satan says that "Simon Magus, Zaroës, Arfaxir, and Jannes and Mambres are my brothers" (Lat. 2, 4:50). In the Penitence of Cyprian (5th century?), the great magician of Antioch relates how the Devil called him "a clever lad, a new Jambres, trained for service, and worthy of fellowship with himself". In his Lausiac History (5th century), Palladius relates that Macarius of Alexandria (4th century) once visited the garden-tomb of Jannes and Jambres, and upon arrival was met by seventy demons who resided there.

== In popular culture ==
- In the film The Ten Commandments (1956), Douglass Dumbrille plays Jannes as a constantly fretful and pompous High Priest of Egypt and a devoted follower of the Nile God Khnum, as well as Court Mage and one of the Pharaoh's top advisers.
- The Prince of Egypt, a 1998 animated DreamWorks film, has Steve Martin and Martin Short provide the voices of Hotep and Huy, characters who were based on Jannes and Jambres. They are somewhat comical characters, despite the movie's overall serious tone.
- In the 2014 film Exodus: Gods and Kings, Indira Varma plays an Egyptian high priestess whose character is roughly parallel to the role of Jannes and Jambres.

== See also ==
- Apocryphon of Jannes and Jambres
- Biblical apocrypha
- Dathan and Abiram
- Harut and Marut
- Plagues of Egypt
