= P. Antinoopolis 7 =

The P. Antinoopolis 7 is a septuagint manuscript that contains part of the text of the book of Psalms. Using the study of comparative writing styles (palaeography), it has been dated to 2nd-century.

== Description ==
The manuscript contains fragments of the book of Psalms 81:1-4; Psalms 82:4-9, 16-17. This is one of the oldest manuscripts already containing nomina sacra κ̅ς̅.

It was published by Colin Henderson Roberts in 1950, and is currently stored in the Ashmolean Museum at Oxford.

== Sources ==
- Pietersma, Albert (1978). "Chapter I. Pap. Chester Beatty XIII and XIV : Introduction". Two Manuscripts Greek Psalter. Analecta Biblica. Investigationes scientificae in Res Biblicas. Vol. 77. Rome: Biblical Institute Press. p. 9.
- Tatu, Silviu (2007). "Graphic Devices Used By The Editors Of Ancient And Mediaeval Manuscripts To Mark Verse-Lines In Classical Hebrew Poetry". In Korpel, Marjo Christina Annette; Oesch, Joseph M.; Porter, Stanley E. (eds.). Method in Unit Delimitation. Pericope: Scripture as Written and Read in Antiquity. Vol. 6. Brill. pp. 92–140. doi:10.1163/ej.9789004165670.i-231.33. ISBN 978-90-04-16567-0.
- Tov, Emanuel (2001). "Scribal Features of Early Witnesses of Greek Scripture". In Hiebert, Robert James Victor; Cox, Claude E.; Gentry, Peter John; Pietersma, Albert (eds.). The Old Greek Psalter: Studies in Honour of Albert Pietersma. Journal for the study of the Old Testament: Supplement series. Vol. 332. A&C Black. ISBN 9781841272092.
