= Sidney Jellicoe =

British-Canadian academic (1906–1973)

- Born: 25 August 1906
- Died: 24 November 1973; Sherbrooke Hospital
- Occupations: University teacher, editor, writer, biblical scholar
- Employers: Bishop's University (1952–1973); International Organization for Septuagint and Cognate Studies (1968–1973); University of Oxford (1971–1973)
- Awards: honorary doctorate

Sidney Jellicoe (25 August 1906 – 24 November 1973) was a British-Canadian dean emeritus, biblical scholar, Harrold professor of Divinity, theological educator, and priest.

== Biography ==
He was a scholar of St Chad's College, Durham. After being ordained by Archbishop William Temple in York Minster in 1934, he served as a parish priest in England for eleven years, then for eight years was Chaplain and Lecturer at Bishop Otter Training College, Chichester. In 1952, he became Dean of Divinity and Harrold Professor at Bishop's University, Lennoxville, Quebec. In 1966, he became Dean of Theology and in 1971 Dean Emeritus, as well as first Chairman of the Division of Graduate Studies.

=== Awards ===
In 1955, Diocesan College, Montreal, conferred on him the degree of Doctor of Divinity (honoris causa) and in 1970 Bishop's University granted him the honorary degree of Doctor of Civil Law.

=== Academic work ===
He was one of the founders of the International Organization for Septuagint and Cognate Studies (IOSCS) including Robert A. Kraft.

== Published works ==
He also wrote a number of articles for learned journals, such as New Testament Studies and the Catholic Biblical Quarterly. In 1968, his definitive work on 20th century Septuagint studies was published by Oxford Clarendon Press, entitled The Septuagint and Modern Study.

- Sidney Jellicoe (1968). The Septuagint and modern study. Oxford: Clarendon Press. ISBN 9780198266174. OCLC 362777.
- Sebastian P. Brock; Charles Theodore Fritsch; Sidney Jellicoe (1973-06-01). A classified bibliography of the Septuagint. Arbeiten zur Literatur und Geschichte des Hellenistischen Judentums. Vol. 6. Leiden: Netherlands: E. J. Brill. doi:10.1163/9789004331822. ISBN 978-90-04-03596-6. OCLC 760456592.
- Sidney Jellicoe (1974). Studies in the Septuagint: origins, recensions, ad interpretations: selected essays. New York: Library of biblical studies. OCLC 470456469.
