= Apocryphon of Jannes and Jambres =

Greek Jewish text (before 244 CE)

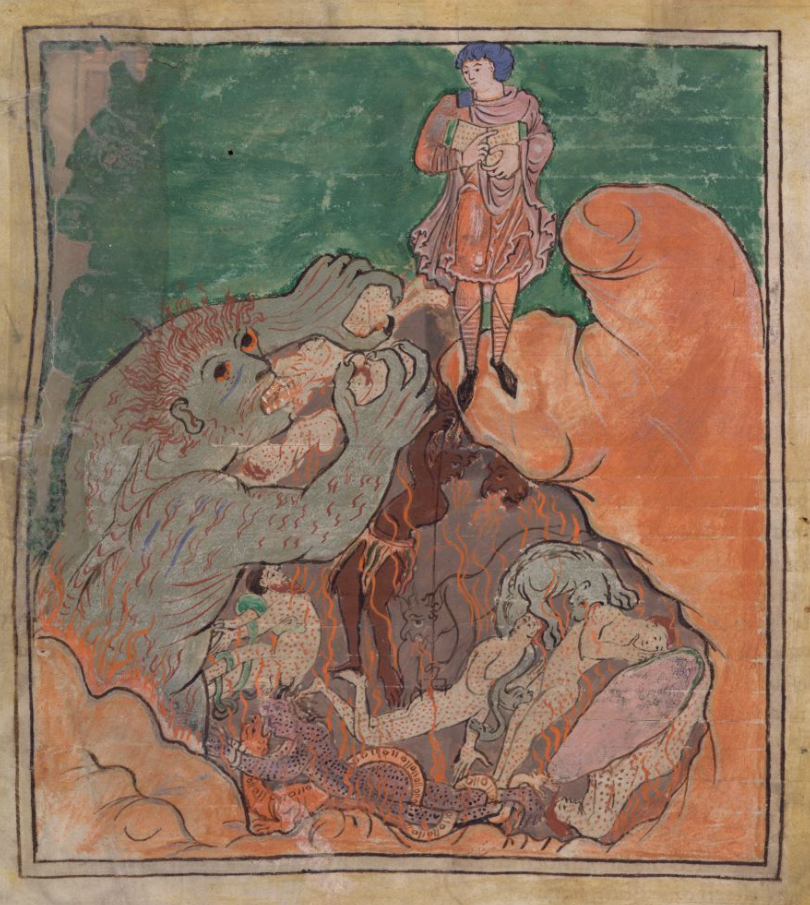
Jambres summoning the "shade" of Jannes from Hell with the aid of a book of magic as illustrated in Cotton MS Tiberius B V/1

The Apocryphon of Jannes and Jambres (also called the Book of Jannes and Jambres) is a Greek text composed between the 1st and 3rd centuries AD, probably in Roman Egypt. It is a pseudepigraphic account of the legendary ancient Egyptian magicians Jannes and Jambres, purportedly written by one of Pharaoh's officials. Today, it is usually classified as part of the Old Testament apocrypha.

Jannes and Jambres is known in its original language only from four fragmentary Greek manuscripts on papyrus. There are also fragments of translations into Latin, Old English and Ethiopic on parchment. The only complete copy is an Ethiopic translation that came to scholarly attention in 2024. The earliest reference to the text is found in Origen (c. 250), who argued that a passage in the New Testament (specifically, 2 Timothy 3:8) is based on it.

== Synopsis ==
The Apocryphon claims to have been written by one of Pharaoh's officials. It tells the story of two brothers, Jannes and Jambres, sons of Balaam, son of Petephres, a priest of Apis. They live near Memphis.

When the brothers' mother has a dream that a cypress is cut down in her paradise, Jannes tells her to keep quiet about it, although he has understood its meaning. When an extraterrestrial being cuts down the cypress, a human unidentified in the fragmentary text, but possibly Moses, warns Jannes that in three years he will afflict Egypt, which is what the strange event foreshadows. In response, Jannes walls the garden and sets a guard. His opponents predict his death and those of his brother and mother for building a "wicked enclosure", which appears to have been a Serapeum.

Jannes and Jambres discuss sexual morality. They agree that marriage should be done away with. Jannes invites the wise men of Egypt to visit his walled paradise and sit under an apple tree. While they are there a thunderstorm and an earthquake cause damage to the trees in the garden. In his library, Jannes seeks to determine the meaning of these events. There he is confronted by four men sent by "the Lord of the earth and the Overseer of the universe" who will lead him away to Hades. Out of pity, the men extend his time on Earth for a fixed period.

While he is discussing marriage with some friends, Jannes is summoned to the palace in Memphis to oppose Moses and Aaron. He matches their feats but is wracked by an illness. As he leaves, he sends word to Pharaoh that Moses's power is of divine origin. Back at his house, he sees celestial omens that indicate the imminent downfall of evil. He is summoned to Memphis to stand trial and commends his mother to the care of his friends. Jannes names Jambres as his successor and entrusts him with a secret document. He warns him not to accompany the Egyptian army when it marches against the Hebrews.

Ethiopic
[Th]is is yours. [And a se]cret you should keep [it]. Take care that you do not go out on the day the king and all the nobles of Egypt go out in order to pursue the people of the Hebrews! Do not go out together with them! [But] consider yourself sick and save your soul from death and from the destruction of Egypt. The God of Heaven will act according to [his] word on behalf of the children of the Hebrews, whom the Egyptians caused to perish in the river.

Translation:

Greek
And he (Jannes) said [to him,] "Jambres, [I hand over to you] a document [and] keep it in secret and [take care not to come out] on the day on which [the king] and the chiefs of [Egypt] come out [to pursue] the people [of the Hebrews nor to go along] with them, [but plan to be unwell and save your own] soul [from death] and from [the destruction of the Egyptians which the god] of the heavens [will carry out according to his word on behalf of the children of the Hebrews whom the Egyptians caused to die in the river."]

The Egyptian army is drowned in the Red Sea while pursuing the Hebrews, but Jambres stayed away. Jannes's condition worsens and the family returns to their estate. Jambres, perhaps referring to a deal with the Devil, complains of violated oaths. Jannes's actual death is violent and perhaps by fire. His mother tries but fails to save him and they exchange parting words. She soon dies violently as well and Jambres buries both of them in the same tomb.

Under the apple tree, Jambres opens the magical books and summons his brother's "shade" from Hades. Jannes is annoyed. He describes his death and conditions in Hades. He warns his brother to change his ways before he too is condemned. Idol worshippers and prostitutes get special mention as sinners who end up in Hell. In a passage found only in the Ethiopic fragment, Jannes also lists by name several giants, asking repeatedly the rhetorical question "where are they?"

Where are Amān and Bārān, the giants who devoured men like locusts and wild animals and cattle and birds? They drank [blood] and despoiled the Orient because they [could] not be satisfied. However, Bapares, their father, lifting a stone of a thousand talents, threw it by his own strength into the heights of heaven. And noontime descended, and he ran that same day 250,000 stadia and returned before the sun set. And where is he? Did he not die? Even he and his wife and his children died!

== Manuscripts ==
There is one complete and six fragmentary manuscript witnesses to the text. The first to come to scholarly attention was a Latin excerpt in 1861 and the most recent one published an Ethiopic fragment in 2019. The most recent to come to light is a complete copy in Ethiopic.

=== Vienna papyrus ===
Eight fragments from a single papyrus scroll now in the papyrus collection of the Austrian National Library in Vienna are the earliest witnesses of Jannes and Jambres, dating to the 3rd century AD. The fragments are catalogued under four numbers as Papyrus Vindobonensis Graecus 29456, 29828, 00180 and 28249. Jannes and Jambres was written on the recto of the scroll, while the verso contains a Hermetic text. The original scroll must have measured at least 3 metres (9.8 ft) in length.

The Vienna papyrus is written in Greek. The scribe did not use abbreviated nomina sacra, which may indicate that he was Jewish. It is unclear, however, which side of the scroll was the original and which side a reuse.

=== Chester Beatty papyrus ===
One of the Chester Beatty fragments

CBL BP XVI in the Chester Beatty Library in Dublin is the most important witness to the Greek text. It consists of 100 papyrus fragments, 99 of which are now mounted in eight glass frames. The fragments come from a codex. They were bound as a single quire of at least 24 pages.

Chester Beatty XVI is written in semi-cursive and makes extensive use of abbreviated nomina sacra, a sign that it was copied in a Christian milieu. On textual and palaeographical grounds, it has been dated to between the 3rd and 5th centuries, probably towards the late 4th century. It was probably produced in the Egyptian hinterland, possibly the Nitrian Desert in the community of Macarius the Great, where the story of Jannes and Jambres was certainly known.

There are sufficient differences between the Vienna and Chester Beatty texts to suggest that two distinct recensions of Jannes and Jambres were in circulation.

=== Michigan papyrus ===
Papyrus 4925 in the University of Michigan Papyrology Collection consists of two fragments from a reused papyrus scroll. It is unclear if Jannes and Jambres was the original text. Just ten lines of the Greek survive, covering part of Jannes and Jambres's genealogy, an early part of the work.

The text on the other side of Papyrus 4925 is a poetic comedy that has been dated to the late 2nd or early 3rd century. The Jannes text may be that early or somewhat later, the 4th century.

=== Heidelberg papyrus ===
The Heidelberg papyrus G 1016 dates to the 4th century. It contains Greek text.

=== Cotton Tiberius parchment ===
Eighteen lines of Jannes and Jambres in Latin and Old English translation are found on folio 87r of London, British Library, Cotton MS Tiberius B V/1. The manuscript dates to the 11th century. The excerpt from Jannes and Jambres is included in Tiberius B V/1 as one of five additions to the Letter of Pharasmanes to Hadrian and its English translation, the Wonders of the East. These are not found in other manuscripts of the Letter or Wonders.

The Cotton Tiberius excerpt concerns Jannes's condemnation to Hell and Jambres's summoning him through necromancy. The illustration does not exactly correspond to the text, which in the Greek versions has the necromancy performed under an apple tree. The tree is omitted in the Latin, but the illustration depicts Jambres on a mountain. The differences between the Latin text and the Greek can be explained by the need of the excerpter to adapt the text to its context.

Folio 87v contains a full-page illustration of the story, but the miniature illustration at the start of 87r belongs with the preceding story. The illustration shows Jambres with an open book standing on a rock trying to summon the "shade" of his brother from Hell while a giant figure rises up from the underworld. Albert Pietersma identifies this figure with Satan, but there is no reference in the Apocryphon to Satan or demons. The figure may be one of the giants referred to in the Ethiopic text.

=== Ethiopian parchment ===
A page from the Ethiopic Jannes and Jambres fragment

The Ethiopic translation of Jannes and Jambres is known from one complete copy and one fragmentary copy. The complete copy brought to scholarly attention in 2024. It is found in a 16th-century manuscript from the monastery of Debre Dammo. Owing to its difficult language, it has only been synopsized and not yet published.

The fragment—now in Addis Ababa, Walda Masqal Centre of the Institute of Ethiopian Studies, Schneider ms. frag. 19—is a parchment bifolium from the 13th century or earlier. The translation itself was made from Greek between the late 4th century and the 6th, probably nearer to the early 5th century. The translation seems to have been fairly literal, but the surviving text has been greatly corrupted in its transmission.

The two parts of the Ethiopic fragment are not consecutive and the second is unique. That is, it does not correspond to any surviving part of the Greek text. It is possible that the latter represents the alternative ending of a distinct recension.

== Literary references ==
The existence of a book entitled Jannes and Jambres is known from several sources. On the whole it seems to have been most popular in Egypt and the Latin West.

=== Citations in other works ===
Origen, in a commentary on the Gospel of Matthew that survives only in a Latin translation, writes that 2 Timothy 3:8 is based on "an apocryphal [book] entitled Jannes and Jambres". Since he was writing after AD 244, Origen provides a terminus ante quem (latest possible date) for the composition of Jannes and Jambres. Since he believed 2 Timothy to have been written by Paul the Apostle, Origen himself placed the composition of the apocryphon no later than the middle of the 1st century AD. He noted that some of his contemporary rejected the canonicity of 2 Timothy because it cited an apocryphal work.

The next two earliest mentions are also in Latin. In the mid-4th century, Ambrosiaster refers to Jannes and Jambres in commenting on 2 Timothy, noting that the passage in question "is an example from the apocrypha". A 6th-century list of apocryphal books known as the Decretum Gelasianum contains the Paenitentia Iamne et Mambre ('Penitence of Jannes and Jambres'). Its circulation by then must have been limited, since already John Chrysostom (died 407) confessed ignorance as to the source used by 2 Timothy.

In the 12th century, Michael Rabo, a historian writing in Syriac, records that sometime between 776 and 781 the Byzantine emperor Leo IV sent a book entitled Jannes and Jambres to the Abbasid caliph al-Mahdī, who collected works of magic. This passage is probably derived from the lost 9th-century history of Dionysius of Tel Mahre. This story was repeated in the 13th century by the Syriac historian Bar Hebraeus. It is seemingly corroborated by two remarks of the East Syriac patriarch Timothy I. In his Apology before the Caliph, he recounts that, in his conversations with al-Mahdī, he countered the latter's claim that unbelievers could work miracles by pointing to the demonic and deceptive nature of the signs of Jannes and Jambres. In his Discourse, another apologetic work, this time directed against Jews, pagans and Muslims, he rejects the ephemeral "Egyptian wisdom of Jannes and Jambres".

=== Possible references ===
The 7th-century chronicle of John of Nikiu, known only from an Ethiopic translation, refers to "the book of the magicians Jannes and Jambres", implying that it existed in the time of Moses. If this is not a direct reference to Jannes and Jambres, it shows knowledge of it, since it is the only source that describes Jannes and Jambres possessing a book of magic. One recension of the Greek Acts of Catherine of Alexandria, in a garbled passage, also seem to show knowledge of Jannes and Jambres. There is a reference to "books" used for necromancy that were either owned by or written about Jannes and Jambres.

Both the Middle English Seinte Marherete and the Latin life of Margaret of Antioch on which it is based refer to a genealogy of demons "in the books of Jannes and Jambres." It is not certain that this is a reference to Jannes and Jambres, but if it is it may indicate that the genealogy of the magicians went back further than in any surviving fragment and included demons.

== Language, date and place of composition ==
The earliest manuscripts are in Greek and it is probable that the original version of Jannes and Jambres was composed in Greek. Arguments have been put forward, however, for an Aramaic original.

Jannes and Jambres was in existence by the time of Origen's writing in 244. The earliest manuscript is from about the same time. The text as it has come down is a Christian text and so dates no earlier than the 1st century. An earlier Jewish origin has been posited. While Pietersma and R. T. Lutz see slight evidence for origin in a Jewish milieu, Ted Erho and Benjamin Henry point out that "there are no clearly Christian references or allusions" in the work. It does contain an allusion to 1 Enoch 7. In light of its ending, the genre of the book may be considered a confession, a typically Christian genre.

Although arguments have been made that Jannes and Jambres was composed in Palestine, the earliest manuscripts and the content of the story itself point to an Egyptian origin.

Alison Salvesen argues that two episodes in the narrative are echoes of the Epic of Gilgamesh: the dream of the felling of the cypress (Gilgamesh's felling of a tree in the Cedar Forest) and the post mortem reference to damned prostitutes (Gilgamesh's cursing of Shamhat on his deathbed). Andrew George finds neither parallel persuasive and suggests that the dream story may be based on the dream of the garden and the three shoots as found in the Book of Giants.

== Bibliography ==
- Erho, Ted M. (2025). "Appendix: Summary of an Additional Manuscript of the Ethiopic Version of Jannes and Jambres". In James R. Davila; Richard Bauckham (eds.). Old Testament Pseudepigrapha. Vol. 2: More Noncanonical Scriptures. Eerdmans. pp. 651–654.
- Erho, Ted M.; Henry, W. Benjamin (2019). "The Ethiopic Jannes and Jambres and the Greek Original". Archiv für Papyrusforschung und verwandte Gebiete. 65 (1): 176–223. doi:10.1515/apf-2019-0010. S2CID 204720562.
- Erho, Ted M.; Henry, W. Benjamin (2025). "Jannes and Jambres: A New Translation and Introduction". In James R. Davila; Richard Bauckham (eds.). Old Testament Pseudepigrapha. Vol. 2: More Noncanonical Scriptures. Eerdmans. pp. 372–385.
- Erho, Ted; Krueger, Frederic; Hoffmann, Matthias (2016). "Neues von Pharaos Zauberern". Welt und Umwelt der Bibel. 2: 70–72.
- Ford, A. J. (2016). Marvel and Artefact: The 'Wonders of the East' in Its Manuscript Contexts. Brill.
- George, Andrew R. (2003). The Babylonian Gilgamesh Epic: Introduction, Critical Edition and Cuneiform Texts. Vol. 1. Oxford University Press.
- Gero, Stephen (1991). "Parerga to 'The Book of Jannes and Jambres'". Journal for the Study of the Pseudepigrapha. 5 (9): 67–85. doi:10.1177/095182079100000905. S2CID 161641094.
- Krueger, Frederic (2018). "Pharaoh's Sorcerers Revisited: A Sahidic Exodus Apocryphon (P.Lips. Inv. 2299) and the Legend of Jannes and Jambres the Magicians Between Judaism, Christianity, and Native Egyptian Tradition". Archiv für Papyrusforschung und verwandte Gebiete. 62 (1): 148–198. doi:10.1515/apf-2018-0008. S2CID 165583551.
- Minov, Sergey (2025). "Timothy I Defending the Cross against Jews and Muslims: A Newly Discovered Testimony". Medieval Encounters. 31 (2): 119–154. doi:10.1163/15700674-12340213.
- Pietersma, Albert; Lutz, R. T. (1995). "Jannes and Jambres (First to Third Centuries A.D.): A New Translation and Introduction". In James H. Charlesworth (ed.). The Old Testament Pseudepigrapha. Vol. 2: Expansions of the "Old Testament" and Legends, Wisdom and Philosophical Literature, Prayers, Psalms and Odes, Fragments of Lost Judeo-Hellenistic Works. Doubleday. pp. 427–442.
- Pietersma, Albert (1994). The Apocryphon of Jannes and Jambres the Magicians. E. J. Brill. doi:10.1163/9789004295827. ISBN 9789004099388.
- Pietersma, Albert (2012). "Two More Fragments of the Vienna Jannes and Jambres". Bulletin of the American Society of Papyrologists. 49: 21–29.
- Salvesen, Alison (1998). "The Legacy of Babylon and Nineveh in Aramaic Sources". In Stephanie Dalley (ed.). The Legacy of Mesopotamia. Oxford University Press. pp. 139–162.
- Schmelz, Georg (2001). "Zwei neue Fragmente des Apocryphons über die Zauberer Jannes und Jambres". Atti del XXII Congresso Internazionale di Papirologia. Florence. pp. 1202–1212.
