= Gerard Watson =

Irish academic

The Reverend Gerard Watson
- Died: 24 July 1998; Dublin, Ireland

Academic background
- Education: Queen's University Belfast
- Thesis: The Stoic Theory of Knowledge

Gerard Watson was an Irish Catholic priest and scholar of classics, theology, and the history of philosophy who died in 1998. He is best known for his book Greek Philosophy and the Christian Notion of God. Other works include The Stoic Theory of Knowledge, Phantasia in Classical Thought, and Plato's Unwritten Teaching. He also published a translation of Augustine's Soliloquies and Immortality of the Soul. In 1978 he was elected to membership in the Royal Irish Academy.
