= P.Leipzig inv. 170 =

The Papyrus Leipzig Inv. 170 (also known as P.Leipzig 170, AT86, Åland AT86, VH 224, LDAB 3092, Rahlfs 2014) is a fragment of a septuagint manuscript written on papyrus in codex form that contains part of the Psalms. Palaeographically it has been dated to the 3rd century CE.

== Description ==
The manuscript contains parts of the Psalms 0118: 27-63 written on papyrus on codex form, 1 columns per page. P.Leipzig 170 has nomina sacra κ̅ς̅ to represents κύριος.

== Sources ==
- TM. "TM 61935 / LDAB 3092". Trismegistos.
- Hurtado, Larry W. (2006). The Earliest Christian Artifacts: Manuscripts and Christian Origins. Wm. B. Eerdmans Publishing. ISBN 9780802828958.
- Tov, Emanuel (2001). "Scribal Features of Early Witnesses of Greek Scripture". In Hiebert, Robert James Victor; Cox, Claude E.; Gentry, Peter John; Pietersma, Albert (eds.). The Old Greek Psalter: Studies in Honour of Albert Pietersma. Journal for the study of the Old Testament: Supplement series. Vol. 332. A&C Black. ISBN 9781841272092.
