= Adrian and Ritheus =

Old English prose literary text

Adrian and Ritheus is an Old English prose literary text preserved in British Library manuscript Cotton Julius A ii, fols 137v-140. It consists of a dialogue of forty-eight formulaic questions and answers between the titular 'Adrianus' and 'Ritheus'. Adrianus interrogates Ritheus using the formulaic expression Saga me ('tell me'); Ritheus responds using the formulaic Ic þe secge ('I tell you'). The nature of the questions posed varies between the factual and the enigmatic, but the style of questioning is "usually short and to the point".

== Analogues and origins ==
Many of the questions asked in Adrian and Ritheus are also featured in the prose version of Solomon and Saturn, a text with "clear relationships" to the former. Twenty of Adrian and Ritheus' forty-eight questions are common with Solomon and Saturn. Bisher identifies the text as part of a "'question and answer' dialogue genre" along with Alfred's translation of Gregory's Dialogues and Augustine's Soliloquies, but characterises Adrian and Ritheus and its analogues as having a '"lighter, more humorous tone".

Another source is the popular Joca Monachorum, whose question formula Dic mihi is the direct Latin equivalent to the Old English Saga me.

=== Christ's ectopic birth ===
In the 41st question of the dialogue, Adrianus asks of Ritheus,

Saga me hu wæs crist acenned of maria his meder. [Tell me how Christ was born from his mother Mary.]

To this, Ritheus replies,

Ic þe secge, ðurc þæt swiðre breost. [I tell you, through the right breast.]

Speculation that the Virgin Mary did not give birth to Christ in the natural fashion was not settled officially until the First Lateran Council of 1123. Nonetheless, Ratramnus and Radbertus, both of Corbie, Francia, would each write a treatise discussing the parturition during the ninth century. The latter satirises the notion that Christ was born from an orifice other than the womb, which suggests that such a belief was held by his some of Radbertus' Frankish contemporaries. Meanwhile, the trope of characters being born from their mother's side is common in Irish legend; Greenfield and Calder consider Irish folklore a significant influence on Adrian and Ritheus' adaptation of the Joca Monachorum.

== Proper names in the text ==
=== Place names ===
==== Glið ====
In question 6, Adrianus asks Ritheus where the sun shines at night, who answers that it shines on three places: the belly of a whale called Leviathan; then Hell; then an island called Glið, where "the souls of holy men rest [...] until Doomsday". Alongside the heavenly implications of the resting place of "holy men", Pheifer suggests this could be the result of a series of scribal mistranscriptions of gliew or gleow (joy, delight) because of the proximity of graphemes <þ> and <ƿ>.

==== Malifica and Intimphonis ====
In question 19 of the dialogue, Adrianus asks Ritheus to tell him "who are the two men in Paradise, and these continually weep and are sorrowful", to which Ritheus answers "Henoch and Elias". Adrianus then asks where they live, to which Ritheus replies,

Ic þe secge, Malifica and Intimphonis; þæt is on simfelda and on sceanfelda [I tell you, Malifica and Intimphonis; that is in Simfelda and in Sceanfelda].

Cross and Hill suggest that the name Intimphonis and sceanfelda may be accounted for by the fact that two glosses in works by Aldhelm would gloss the verbally-similar Latin In tempis to the verbally-similar Old English on scenfeldum. They further suggest that simfelda may be a scribal mistranscription of sinnfelda ('place of sin', from sinn), thus likening it conceptually to Malifica, which seems to echo Latin maleficium ('sin, vice, injury').

Wright reads sceanfelda as scinfelda, which Roberts speculates may derive from the noun scinn 'spectre'. Another reading is Kemble's sunfelda (including sun, perhaps from 'son' or 'sun').

==== Neorxnawang ====
The first question of the dialogue, Adrianus asks Saga me hu lange wæs Adam on neorxnawange ("tell me how long Adam was [on the neorxnawange]"), a contested term often used to express the concept of 'Paradise' in the Old English corpus. The same question is asked in the prose version of Solomon and Saturn, as the variant form neorxenawang.

=== Naming animals ===
==== Belda the fish ====
In question 24, Adrianus asks which creatures are hermaphroditic. Ritheus tells him these are "Belda the fish in the sea [...] Viperus the serpent and Corvus the bird". Cross and Hill argue that Belda is a scribal corruption of Latin belua ('beast'). The reading of belua, as a type of sea-beast may also be a misunderstanding of the Latin etymon, since belua is a name for the hyena in earlier Latin texts - an animal understood to be bisexual (and hence symbolically hermaphroditic) at the time of their composition.

==== Leviathan ====
In question 6, Adrianus asks where the sun shines at night. One of Ritheus' three answers is that it shines "on the belly of the whale which is called Leviathan".
