= De rebus in Oriente mirabilibus =

2nd-5th century Latin letter

Historiated initial from the start of the Old French translation, early 14th century, depicting the robbing of the gold-digging ants

De rebus in Oriente mirabilibus or Mirabilia Orientalia, also known as the Letter of Pharasmanes to Hadrian, is a short Latin text in the form of an epistolary periplus describing the natural and human marvels encountered by the writer on journeys through Mesopotamia, Arabia and Egypt. It is a pseudepigraphal work attributed to King Pharasmanes II of Iberia and addressed to the Roman emperor Hadrian. It was written between the 2nd and 5th centuries AD.

De rebus may originally have been written in Greek, but no Greek fragment survives. There are ten surviving Latin manuscripts, plus four known lost manuscripts. In addition, it was translated into Old English before the year 1000. Two illuminated manuscripts of the English text survive. By around 1300 an Old French translation appeared. It is known from a single manuscript.

Although De rebus originated as a letter describing journeys (with distances between places), its complex transmission has resulted in numerous variations across manuscripts. The original of some passages cannot be accurately reconstructed. The nature of the subject matter—the marvellous and monstrous—confounds efforts to understand the text logically.

== Synopsis ==
The manuscripts do not agree exactly on the divisions of the text, having 36, 37 or 39 sections. The order of the sections is not consistent after section 25. The critical edition of Ann Knock has 36 sections in the following order.

1. The first section is the introduction. Pharasmanes is responding to the Emperor Hadrian's most recent letter, which had been delivered by Asacrates and Monacrates. He now sends information about "the races of men and the different types of places", gathered by himself and his family.
2. The geography of the second section has been garbled in transmission. There is an island in the Euphrates with many sheep (possibly Haditha) at a distance of 100 stadia from a certain city.
3. There is a wealthy trading colony with large sheep called Archemedon some 300 stadia from Babylon.
4. In a place called Fenia or Philonia, live venomous hens.
5. Between Babylonia and Mesopotamia, live beasts like monkeys with eight legs, eight eyes and two heads or horns. Some versions have four eyes, which suggests that conjoined twins may lie behind this account.
6. The region of Pelusia lies 60 stadia from Babylonia. It is home to two-headed snakes. These are the amphisbaenae of Solinus.
7. In the same region are horned onagers.
8. The land of Arabia by the Red Sea is barren because of the horned vipers (serpentes cerastes) that guard the pepper. To harvest the pepper, humans light fires to force the snakes underground, which turns the white pepper berries black.
9. The distance from Babylonia to Persia is 300 stadia. The land is infertile and infested with snakes.
10. In Seleucia live the fire-breathing Cynocephali, men with the heads of dogs.
11. On a nearby island, the Ichthyophagi have knee-length beards and eat raw fish.
12. On the same island, beyond the river Gargarus, live the Myrmidons, man-eating ants the size of small humans. They mine gold, which the local humans steal by means of a stratagem with camels. In all surviving versions, the explanation of the stratagem has become confused but involves female camels loaded with gold rushing across the river to their calves while the male camels are left to be eaten by the ants.
13. The land between the rivers Brixo and Nile, called Mesopotamia in some versions, is inhabited by elephants.
14. The same region is inhabited by multicoloured humans with inordinately long thighs. These transform themselves into storks, who "breed in the area known to the recipient of the Letter", a reference to the annual migration of storks from Africa to Europe.
15. Also in the same region are hippopotamuses, gigantic horse-like animals with lion's feet. They sweat blood.
16. East of the Brixo lives a race of black Anthropophagi called the Hostes. This section is only found in some manuscripts and is probably not original.
17. Also near the Brixo live beasts called lertices with the ears of donkeys, wool of sheep and feet of birds. This section is only found in some manuscripts and is probably not original.
18. On an island in the Brixo there are humans with their faces on their chests.
19. On an island in the Brixo there are dragons (or snakes) 150 feet long and thick as columns.
20. This section has been garbled in transmission. There is a high mountain (or kingdom) in Babylonia (or Armenia, or between Media and Armenia) inhabited by a race of tyrants. Towards the Red Sea lie the cities of Phenix and Ioraba, whose inhabitants dominate the sea and trade with India and Arabia.
21. In the mountains near India there are bearded women who use leopards in lieu of dogs to hunt.
22. In the forests in the mountains near India are another group of women twelve feet tall, having tusks like wild boars, ankle-length hair, tails like oxen and feathers like ostriches. Pharasmanes tried to capture some but they could not be captured alive. These women were later identified with the classical Lamiae.
23. Nearby live a hospitable people and there are many kings by the ocean.
24. Precious stones grow in a river in the land of the Ethiopians.
25. A further 323 stadia away live the Homodubii (the classical onocentaurs).
26. Some 280 stadia away along the ocean, the Soraci or Tritonides inhabit the region of Persia. They are seers.
27. There is a land of evil barbarians with 110 kings. The lakes of the sun and moon are there.
28. In the same place the trees that produce balsam grow.
29. The Donestre, who are soothsayers and can speak all languages, live on an island in the Red Sea. They are cannibals who weep over their victims. This section is only found in some manuscripts and is probably not original. It seems to combine the legend of the crocotta with legends about crocodiles.
30. To the east are the Enotokoitai, a large human race with gigantic ears that they use as mattress and blanket at night.
31. On an island lie men whose eyes glow like lamps. This section is only found in some manuscripts and is probably not original.
32. On an island in Persia is the place of the Sun, called Heliopolis, 200 stadia square, which has two large and splendid temples. The bed where the Sun sleeps at night is there.
33. In Heliopolis, there is a golden vine that produces pearls.
34. On the nearby adamantine mountain, there is a large bird called a Griffin with four feet and a head like an eagle's. The Phoenix (otherwise associated with the Heliopolis in Egypt) also lives there.
35. Beyond Heliopolis are the volcanoes Olympus and Smaragdon and the boiling sea. Black people live there. Beyond them are the Gegotones with the horns and feet of goats. "Beyond that we have heard of nothing but darkness."
36. In the valediction, Pharasmanes states how "these travellers' tales made me wish to see such things for myself", how people "were most anxious that I should put them in touch with Rome" and how he hopes "that you remember it with pleasure for many years."

Several manuscripts contain additional chapters not found in the original, drawn from Isidore of Seville's Etymologies and from other sources.

== Authorship and language ==
De rebus in Oriente mirabilibus purports to be a letter from a king named Pharasmanes to a Roman emperor. In some versions the emperor is Trajan (r. 98–116) and in others Hadrian (r. 117–138). The latter is probably original, with Trajan being a corruption. The Pharasmanes in question is King Pharasmanes II of Iberia (r. 116–132), who is known for his rift with Hadrian, as recorded in the Historia Augusta.

Given Hadrian's interest in the marvellous, "a letter from Pharasmanes to Hadrian dealing with the monstrous and the marvellous is ... not at variance with such historical knowledge as we have of the personages named." In arguing for authenticity, some authors have pointed to Hadrian's known interest in the bizarre. His freedman Phlegon of Tralles was a leading writer in this vein.

If the letter is authentic, it must have been written in Greek. Although it is almost certainly not authentic, there are other indications that the original text was Greek, including the use of the stadion unit for distance and some mythological references without parallel in Latin writings (for example, a description of the Palace of the Sun, which is conflated with Heliopolis in Egypt). Even if the original was not Greek, the letter is "couched in terms intended to give it the appearance of a translation from Greek".

== Date ==
In favour of an early date, it has been argued that a false letter on the strange and marvellous in an elevated tone—an example of adoxography—fits perfectly into the period of the Second Sophistic (2nd and 3rd centuries). Ann Knock concludes that the De rebus was written in Greek "not long after the reigns of Trajan, Hadrian and Pharasmanes—probably towards the end of the second century." Álvaro Ibáñez Chacón dates it later, to the 4th–5th centuries, arguing that it was inspired by the description of Hadrian and Pharasmanes in the Historia Augusta and by the Historia's own tendency to literary invention.

The terminus ante quem (latest possible date) for the existence of De rebus is the appearance of the names of two rivers, Brixo and Gargarus, in the Catholica Probi and the Appendix Probi. These Latin texts were written in the 4th century, but the earliest surviving manuscripts date to the 7th century. The river names are otherwise known only from De rebus. This indicates that the Latin text existed by the 7th century at the latest. All existing Latin versions derive from a single Latin version, either translation or original. If Isidore, who died in 636, knew the text, the terminus ante quem is the same.

== Textual history ==
=== Latin manuscripts ===
No surviving manuscript copy of De rebus has a title. The title De rebus in Oriente mirabilibus was coined by Oswald Cockayne for his 1881 edition.

Start of the text in the Madrid manuscript

There are four versions of the text grouped into two redactions. The two redaction existed no later than the early 9th century and possibly a century earlier, depending on the date of the Liber monstrorum, which draws on redaction II. Ann Elizabeth Knock calls the two redactions the F-Group and P-Group, depending on whether the name of the letter's sender begins with a P (e.g., Premonis) or an F (e.g., Fermes). They are also known as redactions I and II, respectively, although the second redaction is not descended from the first. The four versions are known as A, B, C and D, based on the letters assigned to their type manuscripts by Henry Omont in 1913.

F-Group or redaction I consists of versions A and C in the following manuscripts:

- A – Paris, Bibliothèque nationale de France, NAL 1065, copied in the decades around 900
- A^{1} – Cassino, Biblioteca dell'Abbazia di Montecassino, MS 391, copied in the 11th century in Beneventan script
- A^{2} – Cava de' Tirreni, Biblioteca dell'Abbazia Benedettina della SS. Trinità, Cod. 3, copied in the 11th century in Beneventan script
- A^{3} – Madrid, Biblioteca Nacional de España, MS 19, copied in the 12th century
- A^{4} – Paris, Bibliothèque nationale de France, Latin 7418, copied in the decades around 1300
- C – version found incorporated into Gervase of Tilbury's Otia Imperialia, known from 28 manuscripts

A^{1}, A^{2}, A^{3} and A^{4} are later than A and of the same family but are not directly descended from A. A^{2}, A^{3} and A^{4} all contain the same florilegium of texts and probably originated in southern Italy. They do not contain the complete text of De rebus but an epitome.

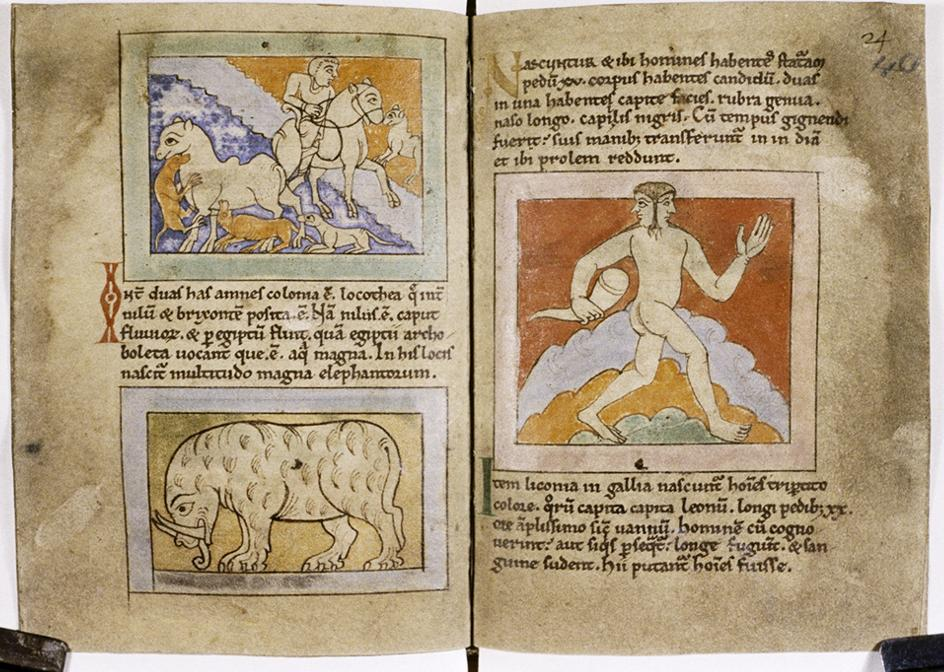
Folios 39v–40r, Bodleian manuscript, early 12th century

P-Group or redaction II consists of versions B and D in the following manuscripts:

- B – version copied by Eberhard Gottlieb Graff (1827) from the now lost manuscript Strasbourg, Cod. C IV.15, a victim of the siege of Strasbourg; possibly of the 8th or 9th century
- D – London, British Library, Cotton Tiberius B.V, part 1, copied in the 11th century
- Related to D are:
  - Bod – Oxford, Bodleian Library, Bodley 614, copied in the 12th century
  - L – London, British Library, Add. 30 898, copied in the 12th century
  - D^{3} – version copied by Jean-Baptiste-François Pitra (1884) from a now lost manuscript from Leiden

D, Bod and L belong to an "insular" subgroup circulating in England that has lost all traces of the text's origins as a letter and has major divergences in the text and in the order of sections. The Old English translations belong to the same subgroup and the Old French translation is closely related. Patrick Gautier Dalché has recently identified two further manuscripts of the P-Group:

- P – Paris, Bibliothèque nationale de France, Latin 4892, copied in the 12th century, also containing the Chronicle of Saint-Maixent
- V – Vatican, Biblioteca Apostolica, Reg. lat. 554, a 15th-century copy of P

Also belonging to the P-Group are at least two lost manuscripts known only from catalogues. Fulda Ordo XV 175, destroyed during the Thirty Years' War, contained a complete copy. Tournai 135, destroyed during World War II, contained a citation of Pharasmanes as a source for its own De mirabilibus orbis terrarum.

In addition, while Gervase quotes almost the entirety of the F-Group text, he also had access to a P-Group text of De rebus closely related to D^{3} and quotes from it in three places in his autograph working copy, Vat. Lat. 933.

=== Old English translation ===
Last page of the Wonders in the Nowell Codex

The Latin text arrived in Anglo-Saxon England between about 650 and 750. It was translated into Old English during the reign of Alfred the Great (871–899) or perhaps slightly later. This version is found in the illuminated Nowell Codex (London, British Library, Cotton Vitellius A.XV) from around the year 1000. A different translation appears alongside the Latin text in manuscript D (London, British Library, Cotton Tiberius B.V, part 1).

=== Old French translation ===
Lepistle le roy P[ar]imenis a lempereur, a translation into Old French, is found in a single manuscript that was copied not long after 1304, now Brussels, Bibliothèque Royale, MS 14562. It is not the original manuscript of the translation but a copy. The scribe who copied it was trained in Flanders. It is in a Picard dialect, probably that spoken around Amiens.

The Picard translation belongs to redaction II. Several peculiarities show that it belongs to the same tradition as the English translation and the Latin version in Bodley 614, but whereas the English version has lost the epistolary framing, the Picard version retains it.

== Genre ==
As a letter in form, De rebus originally conformed to norms of Greco-Latin epistolography. It contained an inscriptio naming the author and addressee, a proemium introducing the topic and a subscriptio of well wishes. These elements were gradually lost as the letter was copied. Only version A preserves the proemium and subscriptio. The D versions have lost all traces of its origin as a letter, even the inscriptio.

Although originally a letter in form, De rebus was not a real letter but a pseudepigraphon, a false letter written probably as a rhetorical exercise and not as an act of deception. Topically, it is a "scientific" letter purporting to add to the curious emperor's knowledge what Pharasmanes has discovered on his journeys. In this way, it mimics a periplus. It has also been compared to paradoxography. It is pagan in outlook, with no hint of the allegorical interpretation of such material common in Christian texts.

== Illustrations ==
Three manuscripts of De rebus are fully illustrated. The oldest is the Nowell Codex (Cotton Vitellius A.XV), which contains the Old English text. De rebus is the only illustrated work among five in that manuscript. Manuscripts D (Cotton Tiberius B.V, part 1), which contains both the Latin and English texts, and Bod (Bodley 614), which contains only the Latin, have the same picture cycle, but entirely different from that in Nowell.

In addition, the Old French translation begins with a historiated initial in its sole manuscript.

== Influence ==
Although De rebus has nothing to do originally with legends about Alexander the Great, the similarity of its material to the so-called "Indian tractates" led to its being used alongside them to augment the Historia de preliis, a Latin version of the Alexander Romance. The J^{1}, J^{2} and J^{3} versions of the Historia have such material. Owing to its epistolary format and similar topic matter, De rebus has sometimes been confused with the Epistola Alexandri ad Aristotelem.

It has been suggested that De rebus may have been used by Isidore of Seville in his Etymologies. Many stories from De rebus are found in the Liber monstrorum.

== Bibliography ==
- Braund, David (1991). "Hadrian and Pharasmanes". Klio. 73 (1): 208–219. doi:10.1524/klio.1991.73.73.208.
- Cary, George (1956). The Medieval Alexander. Cambridge University Press.
- Ford, A. J. (2016). Marvel and Artefact: The 'Wonders of the East' in Its Manuscript Contexts. Brill.
- Gautier Dalché, Patrick (2013). "Notes sur la tradition du De rebus in oriente mirabilibus". In J. Elfassi; C. Lanéry; A.-M. Turcan-Verkerk (eds.). Amicorum societas: Mélanges offerts à François Dolbeau pour son 65^{e} anniversaire. Florence. pp. 237–270.
- Ibáñez Chacón, Álvaro (2019). "BNM MS. 19 (olim A 16): Mirabilia Orientalia. Introducción, edición y traducción" (PDF). Revista de Literatura Medieval. 31: 45–61.
- Ibáñez Chacón, Álvaro (2022). "La epístola De rebvs in Oriente mirabilibvs: un falso tardoantiguo" (PDF). Antiquité Tardive. 30: 247–259. doi:10.1484/J.AT.5.132664.
- James, M. R., ed. (1929). The 'Marvels of the East': A Full Reproduction of the Three Known Copies, with Introduction and Notes. Roxburghe Club.
- Knock, Ann Elizabeth (1982). Wonders of the East: A Synoptic Edition of the Letter of Pharasmanes and the Old English and Old Picard Translations (PDF) (PhD dissertation). University of London.
- Lecouteux, Claude, ed. (1979). De Rebus in Oriente Mirabilibus (Lettre de Farasmanes). A. Hain.
- Lecouteux, Claude, ed. (n.d.). La Lettre de Farasmanes: Édition synoptique accompagnée d'une introduction et de notes. Revised version of Lecouteux 1979.
- Lendinara, Patrizia (2009). "The Letter of Fermes: Not Only Marvels". In Kees Dekker; Karin Olsen; Tette Hofstra (eds.). The World of Travellers: Exploration and Imagination. Peeters. pp. 31–60.
- Malone, Kemp (1964). "An Anglo-Latin Version of the Hjađningavíg". Speculum. 39 (1): 35–44. JSTOR 2850127.
- Orchard, Andy (1995). Pride and Prodigies: Studies in the Monsters of the Beowulf-Manuscript. University of Toronto Press. Originally published by D. S. Brewer, 1985.
- Ross, David J. A. (1963). Alexander Historiatus: A Guide to Medieval Illustrated Alexander Literature. The Warburg Institute, University of London.
- Stoneman, Richard (2012) [1994]. Legends of Alexander the Great. I. B. Tauris.
- Toma, Andreea M. (2024). Exploring Visual Monstrosity in the 'Beowulf' Manuscript: A Digital Edition of 'The Wonders of the East' (PDF) (Master's thesis). University of Padua.
