= Nowell Codex =

Sole surviving manuscript of Beowulf

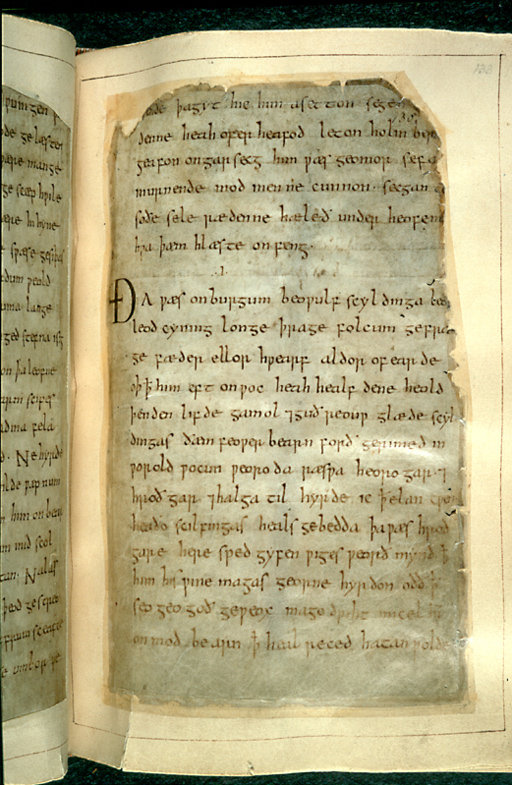
Remounted page from Beowulf, British Library Cotton Vitellius A.XV, 133r

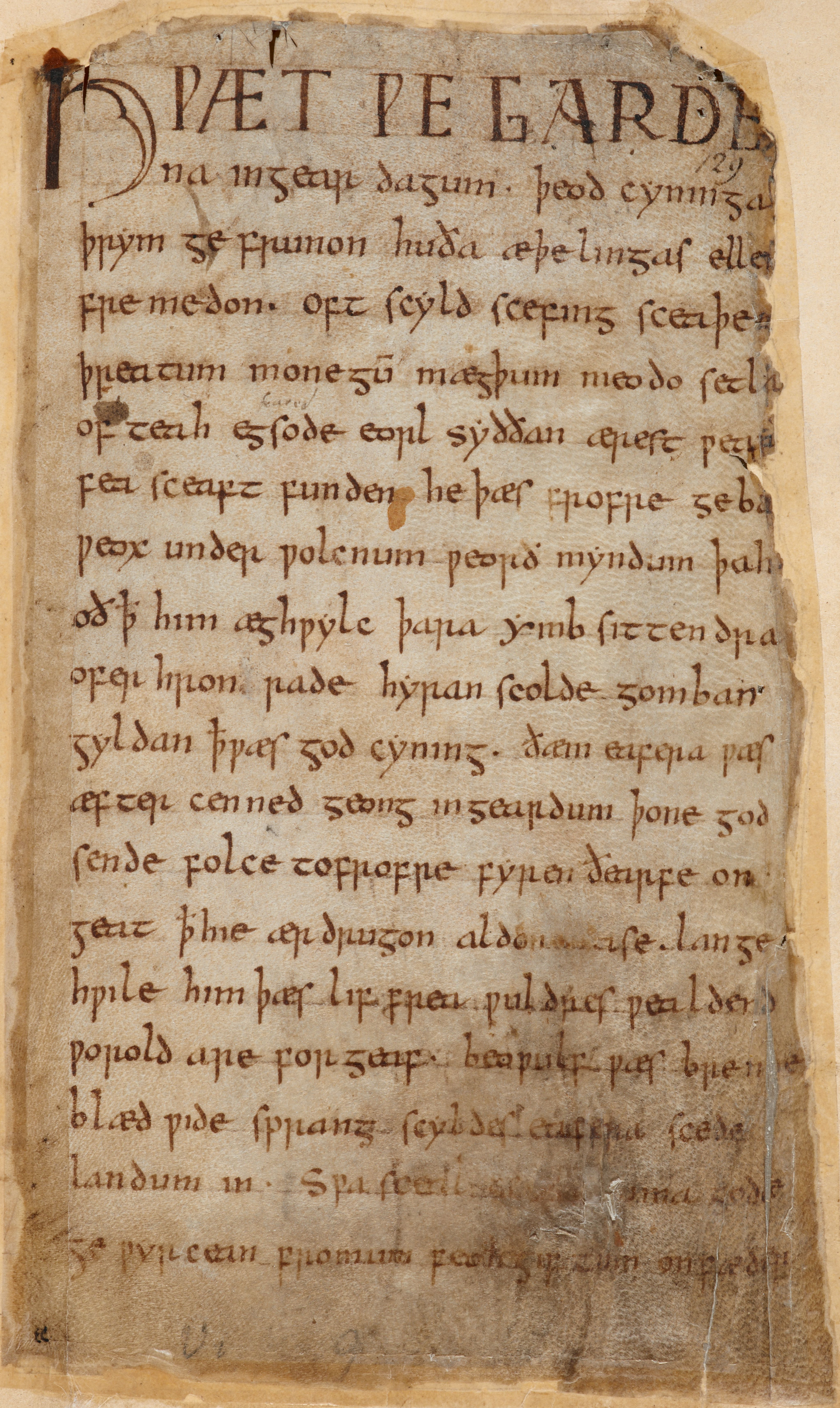
First page of Beowulf, contained in the damaged Nowell Codex (132r)

The Nowell Codex is the second of two manuscripts comprising the bound volume Cotton MS Vitellius A XV, one of the four major Old English poetic manuscripts. It is most famous as the manuscript containing the unique copy of the epic poem Beowulf. In addition to this, it contains first a fragment of The Life of Saint Christopher, then the more complete texts Wonders of the East and Letter of Alexander to Aristotle, and, after Beowulf, a poetic translation of Judith. Due to the fame of Beowulf, the Nowell Codex is also sometimes known simply as the Beowulf manuscript. The manuscript is located within the British Library with the rest of the Cotton collection.

== Name and date ==
The Nowell Codex is currently part of a composite manuscript composed of two separate codices that were not bound together until the 17th century. The first of these, the Southwick Codex, originally owned by Southwick Priory in Hampshire, dates from the 12th century and contains four works of prose.

The Nowell Codex is the second, older manuscript and the more famous. This second manuscript is known as the Nowell Codex, after the antiquarian Laurence Nowell, whose name is inscribed on its first page; he was apparently its owner in the mid-16th century. At some point it was combined with the first codex. It was then acquired by Sir Robert Cotton. In his library, it was placed on the first shelf (A) as the 15th manuscript (XV) of the bookcase that had a bust of the Emperor Vitellius, giving the collection its name. The Nowell Codex is generally dated around the turn of the first millennium. Recent editions have specified a probable date in the decade after 1000.

== Condition of the manuscript ==
The Nowell Codex was written in two hands. The first extends from the beginning of the manuscript (fol. 94a) as far as the word scyran in line 1939 of Beowulf; the second hand continues from moste in that same line to the end of Judith. Elliott Van Kirk Dobbie notes that although the scribes behind the two hands are contemporary, they differ markedly in appearance, the second hand appearing "to belong to an older school of insular writing than its companion hand."

The volume was heavily damaged in 1731 when a fire partially destroyed the Cotton library. While the volume itself survived, the edges of the pages were badly scorched; no serious attempt at restoration was made until the 19th century, by which time the margins had crumbled irreparably, and the edges of many pages are now illegible. Three pages, fol. 182a, fol. 182b and fol. 201b are in notably bad shape, showing more damage than can be explained by the Cottonian fire, with many words faded or illegible, some of which are far from the edges of the leaf. Van Kirk Dobbie suggests the damage to the third of these pages was due to Beowulf being separated from Judith prior to the 17th century, and fol. 201b was on the outside of the manuscript with no binding to protect it. But he offers no explanation for the condition of the first two pages.

The damage to the Nowell Codex can be overcome to different degrees. The three pages in bad shape mentioned above have been studied under ultraviolet light, and the resulting information has been published. Three modern transcriptions of parts of this portion of this manuscript are known. Two of these transcriptions, known as A and B, were made under the direction of the first editor of Beowulf, Grimur Jonsson Thorkelin in the years 1786-1787 after the Cottonian fire yet before the manuscript had deteriorated as far as it presently has. Transcript A was made by an unidentified professional copyist, while B was made by Thorkelin himself. The third transcript (MS Junius 105, currently in the Bodleian Library) is of the Judith poem and was made by Franciscus Junius between 1621 and 1651. A careful copy of the poem with only occasional errors, Junius' transcription preserves the text of the poem before it suffered fire damage.

== Contents ==
The Nowell Codex begins with three prose works: a life of Saint Christopher, Wonders of the East (a description of various far-off lands and their fantastic inhabitants), and a translation of a Letter of Alexander to Aristotle.

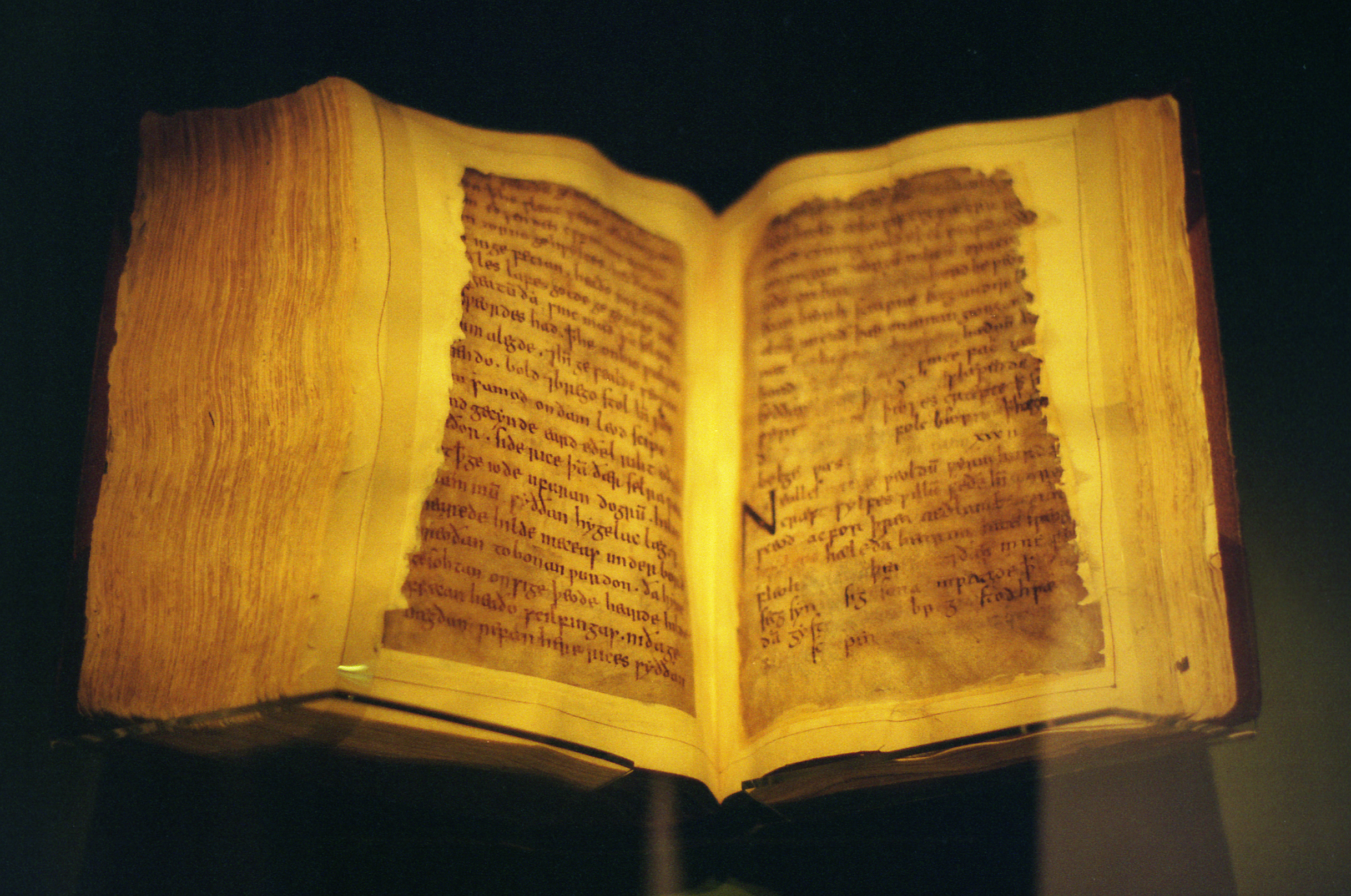
The codex, opened to a page of Beowulf

These are followed by Beowulf, which takes up the bulk of the volume, and Judith, a poetic retelling of part of the book of Judith. Great wear on the final page of Beowulf and other manuscript factors such as wormhole patterns indicate Judith was not originally the last part of the manuscript, though it is in the same hand as the later parts of Beowulf.

The somewhat eclectic contents of this codex have led to much critical debate over why these particular works were chosen for inclusion. One theory which has gained considerable currency is that the compiler(s) saw a thematic link: all five works deal to some extent with monsters or monstrous behaviour.

== See also ==
- Old English literature
- Beowulf
- Junius manuscript (erroneously referred to as Caedmon manuscript)
- Exeter Book
- Liber Monstrorum
- Vercelli Book
