= Southwick Codex =

A page from the Soliloquies

The Southwick Codex is the younger of two manuscripts now bound together as Cotton MS Vitellius A XV in the British Library. The other is the Nowell Codex, which comes after it in the composite manuscript. Tiffany Beechy labels it "a pre-scholastic compendium of Christian philosophy".

The Southwick Codex consists of 90 leaves of parchment plus 3 parchment fly-leaves, which received an official foliation (numbering) in 1884. The fly-leaves were introduced when Robert Cotton had the two codices bound together sometime before 1630. Since 1884, one of the fly-leaves has been removed. There are two lacunae marked by leaves of paper that are not numbered.

The codex is the work of a single scribe active in the middle of the 12th century. It was acquired by Southwick Priory, from which it gets its name, later that century. An ex libris note was added to the bottom of folio 5r in the late 13th century.

The contents of the Southwick Codex are:

1. The Old English translation of the Soliloquies of Augustine attributed to Alfred the Great.
2. An Old English translation of the Gospel of Nicodemus with the beginning missing.
3. The Old English Prose Solomon and Saturn
4. An Old English homily on Saint Quentin with the ending missing and the corresponding text of a Latin passion-narrative

Beechy suggests the "continental-aligned material" at the beginning and end, Augustine and Quentin, is forming a protective cover for "the more heterodox matter", the "Irish-related, apocryphal material" in the middle. She also notes, however, that all the complete material (that is, all save THE homily on Saint Quentin) are dialogues and the collection may attest its creator's interest in that format for probing theological and philosophical questions.

== Sources ==
- Beechy, Tiffany. "The Manuscripts of Solomon and Saturn: CCCC 41, CCCC 422, BL Cotton Vitellius A. xv." Humanities 11.2 (2022): 52.
- Gerritsen, Johan. "British Library MS Cotton Vitellius A.xv – A Supplementary Description." English Studies 69:4 (1988): 293–302. doi:10.1080/00138388808598580
- Torkar, Roland. "Cotton Vitellius A. xv (pt. I) and the Legend of St Thomas." English Studies 67.4 (1986): 290–303. doi:10.1080/00138388608598452
