= Wonders of the East =

Circa AD 1000 Old English text

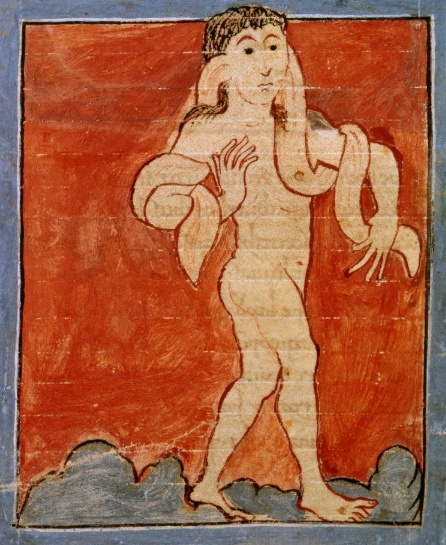
An illustration from Cotton Tiberius B. v

The Old English Wonders of the East (or Marvels of the East) is a prose text from around AD 1000. It is accompanied by many illustrations in the two manuscripts in which it appears. It describes a variety of odd, magical and barbaric creatures that inhabit Eastern regions, such as Babylonia, Persia, Egypt, and India. The earlier manuscript is the famous Nowell Codex, which is also the only manuscript containing Beowulf. The Old English text was translated from a Latin text now referred to as De rebus in Oriente mirabilibus, and remains mostly faithful to the Latin original.

== Synopsis ==
The Wonders of the East is a contribution to the mirabilia genre, "literature in which a traveler in foreign lands describes exotic sights in a letter home." In addition, The Wonders of the East demonstrates the "mutual mistrust" between men and monsters because the creatures either flee from humans, harm those that come near them, or eat people. Some scholars such as Andrea Rossi-Reder have identified in the text an example of 'proto-Orientalism.'

== Manuscript versions ==
The Old English Wonders of the East is found in two manuscripts, both illustrated with fairly simple pictures. Space was reserved for the illustrations on each page, then filled in after the text was written. The Tiberius manuscript most intricately illustrates the 37 wonders described in both Latin and Old English. The Nowell Codex, in Old English, contains only 32 images. The images parallel the text, and provide a picture of the described creatures. The Wonders of the East may be considered a pseudo-scientific text because of the illustrations. Therefore, the images are "possibly intended to lend a note of authority by making specific plants, animals, or monsters easier to recognize." In addition, the images are simple and have one or two figures in each illustration. More specifically, "One of the most important characteristics of ... their illustrations is that the races are seen in some sort of relationship to the viewer, rather than in [the] isolation of an empty frame." In the Tiberius manuscript, every section except for the gold digging ants are accompanied by an illustration. Christopher Monk argues the illustrations in The Wonders of the East of the Beowulf manuscript play an important role in studies of the creatures as representative of human sexuality and the act of "othering" femininity.

=== Nowell Codex ===
A page of the Wonders from the Nowell Codex

The Wonders of the East is in the Beowulf manuscript (also known as the Nowell Codex, London, British Library, Cotton Vitellius A. xv). It is written in Late West Saxon in a Mercian dialect. Other than Beowulf and The Wonders of the East, the other works in this codex include: The Passion of St. Christopher, Alexander's Letter to Aristotle, and Judith. One scribe is believed to have copied The Passion of St. Christopher, Alexander's Letter to Aristotle, The Wonders of the East, and first part of Beowulf, while another scribe wrote the remainder of Beowulf and Judith. The first scribe, known as Scribe A used a more traditional square insular minuscule script, while Scribe B uses a newer, round minuscule script. This has made it quite difficult to date the codex, as the two scripts originate from slightly different periods of Anglo-Saxon society.

The date of this manuscript is usually believed to be "within a couple of decades of AD 1000," argued to be no earlier than AD 997 and no later than AD 1016, although other scholars have dated it to be from as early as the 8th century. The earliest known owner of the codex was antiquarian Laurence Nowell, who left his signature in the top margin of several pages from the manuscript.

The manuscript is heavily damaged from the Cotton Library fire in 1731 and so some parts of accompanying texts are missing. The codex may have been intentionally put together because four of the manuscripts discuss monsters. Andy Orchard argues the monsters witnessed in The Wonders of the East are identifiable in other texts of the manuscript. The Donestre are described as cannibal creatures who lure foreigners in with "devious words" before eating all but their heads. These monsters sit and "weep over the head", which scholars such as Orchard have used to show how the creature resembles Grendel's Mother from Beowulf. Orchard further argues that these monsters reflect those who do not conform to Anglo-Saxon norms, and are a construction of the "other". Christopher Monk discusses theories focused on the sexuality and femininity of the monsters found in The Wonders of the East. He claims these monsters are depictions of human sexuality, aided by the illuminations which accompany the prose.

The text is the only one from the Nowell Codex to be illustrated or "illuminated," which some highlight as central to the monster studies applied to the manuscript. Orchard argues that the text is a liber monstrorum and illustrations aid the reader in studying the creatures described in the prose. Other creatures encountered include the snakes, which may stand for the dragon. These creatures are said to have "horns as large as rams" and anyone who "strikes them or touches them" will die and the area around them "set ablaze". Another creature called a conopenae was said to have the head of a dog, which some scholars have argued links with Saint Christopher, whose hagiography is included in the Nowell Codex. According to the Vitellius version of his Life, he 'wæs healf hundisces manncynnes' (was of the race of the dog-heads / of the half-dog people).

=== Cotton Tiberius manuscript ===
The Wonders of the East is also preserved in the mid-eleventh-century Cotton Tiberius B. v, in both Latin and Old English. The same artist probably illustrated three sections in the manuscript, including a calendar, computus and metrical tables (fols 2-19); Cicero's Aratea (fols 32v-49v); and Wonders of the East (fols 78v-87v). Unlike the Vitellius Wonders, the drawings in this manuscript are neatly framed and represent the content of the text more closely. These three sections are thematically related as they all deal with material conveying knowledge of the physical world. In general, the Tiberius manuscript is considered to be a "book of nature" with encyclopaedic potentiality.

As the Wonders appears in both Latin and Old English in Tiberius B. v, it takes up an entire quire of eight, as well as the first two leaves of the next quire, with the Latin written before the Old English. It contains five additions to the text, including an excerpt drawn from the ancient Apocryphon of Jannes and Jambres.

After fire damage, the Tiberius measures 260 by 220 mm, making it one of the largest English computus manuscripts.
