= Albert Pietersma =

Dutch academic (1935–2025)

- Born: September 28, 1935; Opende, Netherlands
- Died: March 25, 2025 (aged 89)
- Education: Doctor of Philosophy
- Alma mater: University of Toronto
- Occupations: Emeritus (University of Toronto, 2001–2025)
- Employer: University of Toronto (1976–2001)

Albert Pietersma (September 28, 1935 – March 25, 2025) was a Dutch-Canadian philologist and academic who was professor emeritus of Septuagint and Hellenistic Greek in the Department of Near and Middle East Civilizations at the University of Toronto's Faculty of Arts and Science.

== Life and career ==
=== Background ===
Pietersma was born on September 28, 1935, in Opende, Netherlands, of Frisian parents as the second child in a family which included four boys and two girls. At the age of thirteen, Pietersma began studying agricultural education to become a farmer, but his studies were interrupted by emigration to Canada in the spring of 1951. He then helped his parents raise the family near Brockville, Ontario, working in a factory during the day and farming when he returned from work, and in the summers he worked late into the night bringing in hay. In 1956 he started doing high school by correspondence.

In 1960 he married Margaret J. Stadig (native of Amsterdam) and they had three children: Bryan, Kevin and Larisa. Pietersma died on March 25, 2025, at the age of 89.

=== Education ===
Pietersma studied Calvin College, and when he had not yet graduated, had a conversation with John W. Wevers, who visited the school, and encouraged him to pursue his academic interests. In 1962, he earned a Bachelor of Arts in Classics and Philosophy from Calvin College. In 1965 he earned a Bachelor of Divinity from Calvin Theological Seminary. From 1970 he held a Ph.D. in Hebrew Language and Literature (Septuagint) from the University of Toronto, under the tutelage of Professor Wevers with the dissertation A Textual-Critical Analysis of Chester Beatty Biblical Papyri IV and V.

=== Teaching ===
From 1969 to 1970 he was a sessional lecturer in the Department of Near Eastern Studies at University of Victoria, and from 1970 to 1976 he was associate professor. From 1976 to 1981 he was associate professor at University of Toronto and 1981 to 2001 he became a full professor. Until his retirement in 2001, he was professor emeritus of Septuagint and Hellenistic Greek in the Department of Near and Middle Eastern Civilizations at the University of Toronto.

=== Affiliations ===
From 1972 to 1980, he was secretary and archivist of the International Organization for Septuagint and Cognate Studies, from 1980 to 1987 he was president, and from 1993 honorary president.

== Views ==
=== Kurios in the LXX ===
Pietersma had proposed that the original Septuagint did not contain the tetragrammaton, but that it has been included as a result of a Hebraized recensions, and "he argues that an analysis of the translation technique used by the LXX traducteurs when they dealt with certain instances of the Hebrew tetragram suggests that they used Kúrios to render it". Sean M. McDonough, Natalio Fernández Marcos and others have accepted Pietersma's thesis. On the other hand, Pierre-Maurice Bogaert, Martin Hengel, Emanuel Tov and others do not accept Pietersma's theory.

== Works ==
=== Thesis ===
- Sir Alfred Chester Beatty; Albert Pietersma (1977). A Textual-Critical Analysis of Chester Beatty Biblical Papyri IV and V (PhD Thesis. University of Toronto). Toronto: Samuel Stevens Hakkert. OCLC 15844393.

=== Books ===
- Pietersma, Albert, ed. (1993). The Apocryphon of Jannes and Jambres the magicians: P. Chester Beatty XVI; (with new editions of Papyrus Vindobonensis Greek inv. 29456 + 29828 verso and British Library Cotton Tiberius B. v f. 87); with full facsimile of all three texts. Religions in the Graeco-Roman world / Religions in the Graeco-Roman world. Vol. 119. BRILL. doi:10.1163/9789004295827. ISBN 978-90-04-09938-8. This is a critical edition of the Apocryphon of Jannes and Jambres.
- Pietersma, Albert; Wright, Benjamin G., eds. (2007). A New English Translation of the Septuagint. Oxford University Press. ISBN 978-0-19-972394-2.

=== Articles ===
- Pietersma, Albert (1980). "David in the Greek Psalms". Vetus Testamentum. 30 (2): 213–226. doi:10.2307/1517526. JSTOR 1517526.
- Pietersma, Albert (1984). "Kyrios or Tetragram: a renewed quest for the original LXX". DE SEPTUAGINTA. Studies in Honour of John William Wevers on his sixty-fifth birthday (PDF). Mississauga, Ont., Canada: Benben Publications. pp. 85–101. ISBN 978-0-920808-10-8. OCLC 11446028.
- Pietersma, Albert (2002-01-01). "A New Paradigm for Addressing Old Questions: The Relevance of the Interlinear Model for the Study of the Septuagint". Bible and Computer. Brill. pp. 337–364. doi:10.1163/9789004493339_023. ISBN 978-90-04-29582-7. S2CID 13890927.
- Pietersma, Albert (2005-01-01). "Septuagintal Exegesis and the Superscriptions of the Greek Psalter". In Miller, Patrick D.; Flint, Peter W. (eds.). The Book of Psalms. Vetus Testamentum, Supplements. Vol. 99. pp. 443–475. doi:10.1163/9789047414797_023. ISBN 978-90-474-1479-7.
