= John William Wevers =

Biblical scholar

- Born: 4 June 1919; Baldwin
- Died: 22 July 2010
- Education: Princeton Theological Seminary
- Occupations: Theologian, university teacher
- Employer: University of Toronto
- Awards: Honorary doctor of Leiden University (1985)

John William Wevers (born June 4, 1919, in little Baldwin – July 22, 2010 Toronto, Ontario) was an American professor in the Department of Near Eastern and Middle Studies, at the University of Toronto. He is known for his studies in the Septuagint.

== Early life ==
He was the son of Bernard Wevers and Willemina (Te Grootenhuis) Wevers. In 1942 he married Grace Della Brondsema and they had four children.

In 1940 he earned a BA in classics from Calvin College. In 1943 he earned his ThB at Calvin Theological Seminary, Grand Rapids, Michigan. In 1946 he earned his ThD from Princeton Theological Seminary under the tutelage of Henry Snyder Gehman.

== Career ==
In 1963 he become a professor at the University of Toronto. From 1972 to 1975 he was chair of the Department's Graduate Studies and from 1975 to 1980 chair of the combined College Departments of Near Eastern Studies.

== John William Wevers Prize in Septuagint Studies ==
In memory of John William Wevers the International Organization for Septuagint and Cognate Studies (IOSCS) offered an annual prize of $350 named in memory of John William Wevers to be awarded to an outstanding paper in the field of Septuagint studies.

== Bibliography ==
=== Books ===
- Text history of the Greek Deuteronomy. Vandenhoeck & Ruprecht. 1978. ISBN 9783525823880.
- Text history of the Greek Leviticus. Vandenhoeck & Ruprecht. 1986. ISBN 9783525824405.
- Notes on the Greek text of Exodus. Scholars Press. 1990. ISBN 9781555404543.
- Text history of the Greek Exodus. Vandenhoeck & Ruprecht. 1992. ISBN 9783525824795.
- Notes on the Greek text of Genesis. Scholars Press. 1993. ISBN 9781555408848.
- Notes on the Greek text of Deuteronomy. Atlanta. 1995. ISBN 0-7885-0061-9.
- Wevers, John William (1997). Notes on the Greek text of Leviticus. Atlanta. ISBN 0-7885-0324-3.
- Wevers, John William (1998). Notes on the Greek text of Numbers. Atlanta. ISBN 0-7885-0504-1.
- Studies in the text histories of Deuteronomy and Ezekiel. Göttingen. 2003. ISBN 3-525-82528-5.

=== Articles ===
- Wevers, John Wm (1956). A Study in the Form Criticism of Individual Complaint Psalms. Vetus Testamentum. Vol. 6. Brill. pp. 80–96. doi:10.2307/1516027. JSTOR 1516027.
- "Eine Tora fur den Konig Talmai: Untersuchungen zum Ubersetzungsverstandnis in der judisch-hellenistischen und rabbinischen Literatur". The Journal of the American Oriental Society. 116 (1). American Oriental Society: 143. 1996. doi:10.2307/606395. JSTOR 606395.

== Sources ==
- "JOHN WEVERS OBITUARY". legacy.com.
- "R.I.P. John William Wevers". biblical-studies.ca. 2010-07-29. Archived from the original on 2011-11-06.
- Hilhorst, A. (1991-01-01). "Wevers, J. W., "Notes on the Greek Text of Exodus" (Book Review)". Journal for the Study of Judaism in the Persian, Hellenistic, and Roman Period. 22. Leiden: 153–155.
- Pietersma, Albert; Cox, Claude (eds.). De Septuaginta : studies in honour of John William Wevers on his sixty-fifth birthday.
- Pietersma, Albert; Gentry, Peter J. (2010). "John William Wevers (1919-2010): A Biographical Note". Bulletin of the International Organization for Septuagint and Cognate Studies. 43: 2–4.
- Van Seters, J. (2010-11-12). "Obituary: John William Wevers (June 4, 1919 — July 22, 2010)". Studies in Religion/Sciences Religieuses. 39 (4): 633–635. doi:10.1177/0008429810382722. S2CID 220901752.
