= International Organization for Septuagint and Cognate Studies =

- Abbreviation: IOSCS
- Established: 19 December 1968 (58 years ago)
- Types: organization
- Location: United States

The International Organization for Septuagint and Cognate Studies (IOSCS) is an international association of researchers whose main research focus is the study of the Septuagint and related texts.

== Research ==
The IOSCS has published a journal since 1968. It was first published as Bulletin of the International Organization of Septuagint and Cognate Studies (BIOSCS), and, since 2011, under the title Journal of Septuagint and Cognate Studies (JSCS), each one in annual volumes. The editor is Siegfried Kreuzer. In addition, the monograph series, edited by Wolfgang Kraus, has been published since 1972.

The IOSCS organizes international congresses every three years, in organizational connection with the congresses of the International Organization for the Study of the Old Testament (IOSOT). The 16th Congress was held in Stellenbosch in 2016, and the 17th Congress was held in Aberdeen in 2019. The site of the 18th Congress (2022) is Zurich. In addition, the IOSCS participates in the annual meetings of the Society of Biblical Literature.

The IOSCS carries out various projects. These include the New English Translation of the Septuagint (NETS), the Hexapla Project and the Society of Biblical Literature Commentary on the Septuagint (SBLCS).

== John William Wevers Prize in Septuagint Studies ==
Since 2011, the IOSCS has awarded the John William Wevers Prize in Septuagint Studies (in honor of John William Wevers) for outstanding research achievements in the field of Septuagint research and related fields.

The previous award winners are:

- 2020: Joel Korytko
- 2019: Bryan Beeckman
- 2018: Daniel Olariu
- 2017: Jelle Verburg
- 2016: Nesina Grütter
- 2015: Christoffer Theis
- 2014: James R. Covington
- 2013: Ben Johnson
- 2012: Not awarded
- 2011: Bradley John Marsh
