= Soliloquies of Augustine =

4th-century book by Augustinus van Hippo

Start of the Old English Soliloquies in the Southwick Codex. The first line reads Agustinus Cartaina bisceop.

The Soliloquies of Augustine (Latin: Soliloquia) is a two-book document written in 386–387 AD by the Christian theologian Augustine of Hippo.

The book has the form of an "inner dialogue" in which questions are posed, discussions take place and answers are provided, leading to self-knowledge. The first book begins with an inner dialogue which seeks to know a soul. In the second book it becomes clear that the soul Augustine wants to get to know is his own.

A translation of the first half of the Soliloquies into Old English is attributed to Alfred the Great, where it is known as the Blostman ('bloom') or Anthology.
