= Liber Monstrorum =

Anglo-Latin catalogue of marvelous creatures

The Liber Monstrorum (or Liber monstrorum de diversis generibus) is a late seventh-or early eighth-century Anglo-Latin catalogue of marvellous creatures, which may be connected with the Anglo-Saxon scholar Aldhelm. It is transmitted in several manuscripts from the ninth and tenth centuries, but is often studied in connection with the better-known text Beowulf, since the Liber also mentions King Hygelac of the Geats and that he was renowned for his large size. Some scholars argue that the Beowulf-poet was in fact inspired by the Liber Monstrorum. The book contains accounts of extraordinary people, such as Hygelac, historical reports of actual peoples, such as the Ethiopians, and mythological reports, such as the cyclopes and centaurs.

== See also ==
- Wonders of the East
