= Shemot (parashah) =

13th portion in the Jewish cycle of weekly Torah reading

Shemot, Shemoth, or Shemos (Hebrew: שְׁמוֹת, 'names'; second and incipit word of the parashah) is the thirteenth weekly Torah portion (פָּרָשָׁה, parashah) in the annual Jewish cycle of Torah reading and the first in the Book of Exodus. It constitutes Exodus 1:1–6:1. The parashah tells of the Israelites' affliction in Egypt, the hiding and rescuing of the infant Moses, Moses in Midian, the calling of Moses by God, circumcision on the way, meeting the elders, and Moses before Pharaoh.

It is made up of 6,762 Hebrew letters, 1,763 Hebrew words, 124 verses, and 215 lines in a Torah scroll. Jews read it on the thirteenth Sabbath after Simchat Torah, generally in late December or January.

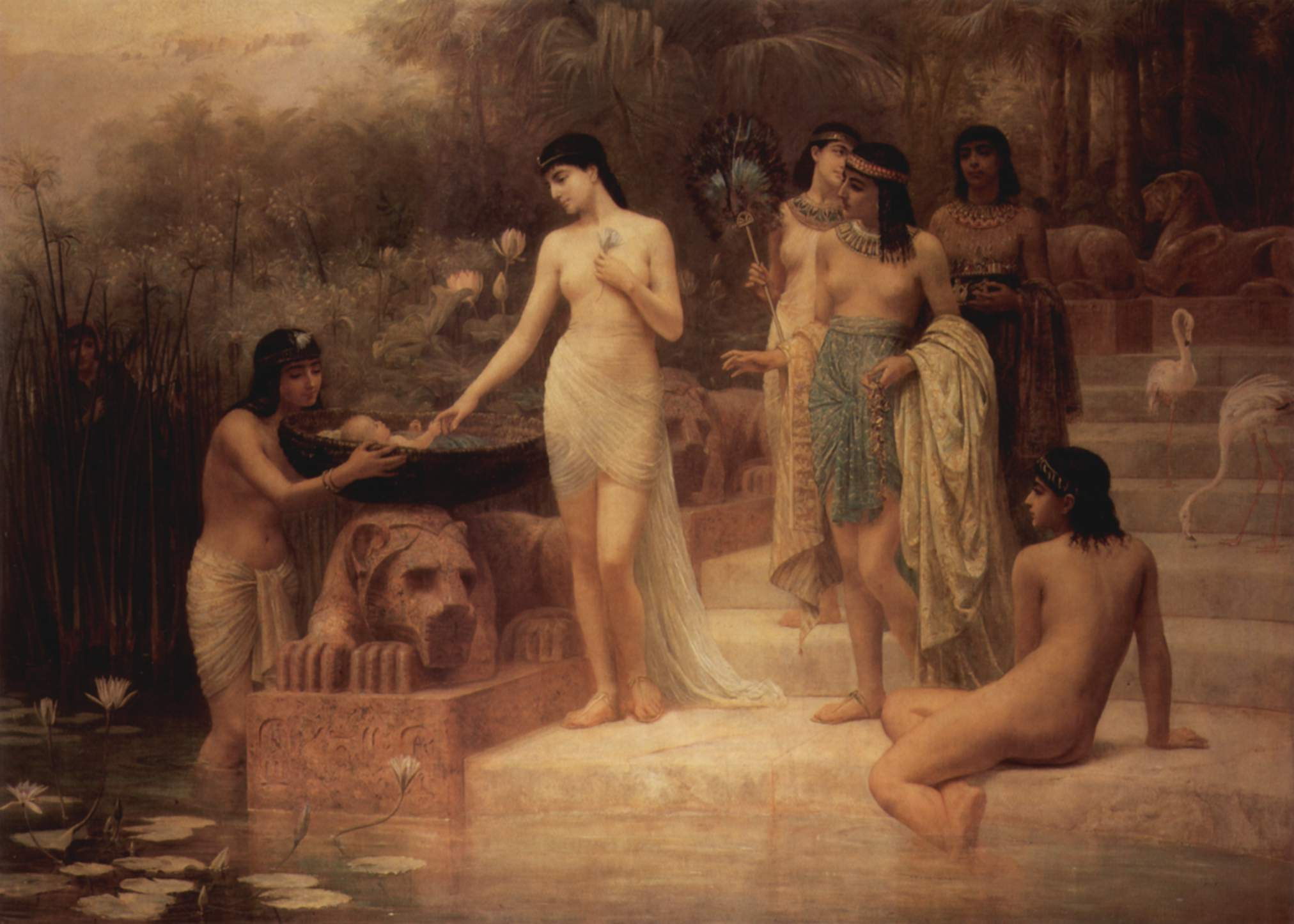
The Discovery of Moses. Pharaoh's daughter finds Moses in the Nile (1886 painting by Edwin Long)

== Readings ==
In traditional weekly Torah reading, the parashah is divided into seven readings, or עליות, aliyot. In the Masoretic Text of the Hebrew Bible, parashat Shemot has six "open portion" (פתוחה, petuha) divisions (roughly equivalent to paragraphs, often abbreviated with the Hebrew letter פ (pe)). Parashat Shemot has two further subdivisions, called "closed portion" (סתומה, setuma) divisions (abbreviated with the Hebrew letter ס (samekh)) within the open portion divisions. The first open portion divides the first reading. The second open portion covers the balance of the first and part of the second readings. The third open portion covers the balance of the second and part of the third readings. The fourth open portion covers the balance of the third and all of the fourth and fifth readings. The fifth open portion divides the sixth reading. And the sixth open portion covers the balance of the sixth and all of the seventh readings. Closed portion divisions separate the third and fourth readings and conclude the seventh reading.

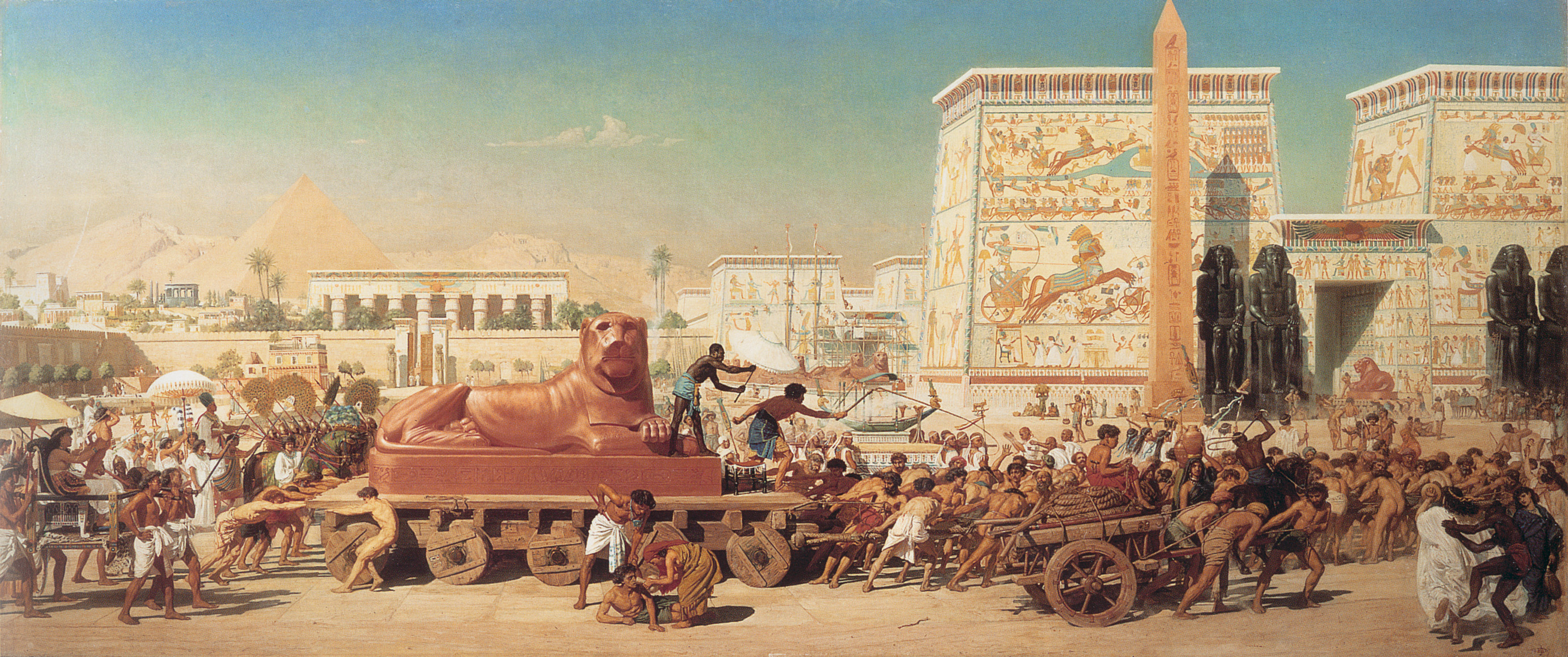
Israel in Egypt (1867 painting by Edward Poynter)

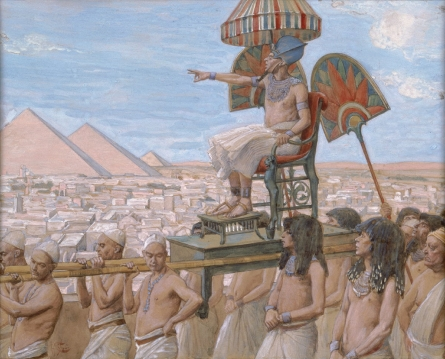
Pharaoh Notes the Importance of the Jewish People (watercolor circa 1896–1902 by James Tissot)

=== First reading—Exodus 1:1–17 ===
In the first reading, seventy descendants of Jacob descended to Egypt and the Israelites were fruitful and filled the land. The first open portion ends here.

Joseph and all of his generation had died, and a new Pharaoh rose to the throne who did not know Joseph. Pharaoh told his people that the Israelites had become too numerous and required shrewd dealing, lest they multiply and join Egypt's enemies. The Egyptians thus set taskmasters over the Israelites to afflict them with burdens, and the Israelites built store-cities for Pharaoh, Pithom and Raamses. The more that the Egyptians afflicted them, the more the Israelites multiplied. The Egyptians embittered the Israelites' lives with hard service in brick and mortar and in the field. Pharaoh told Shiphrah and Puah, midwives to the Israelites, that when they delivered Hebrew women, they were to kill the sons, but let the daughters live. However, the midwives feared Yahweh, and disobeyed Pharaoh, saving the baby boys. The first reading ends here.

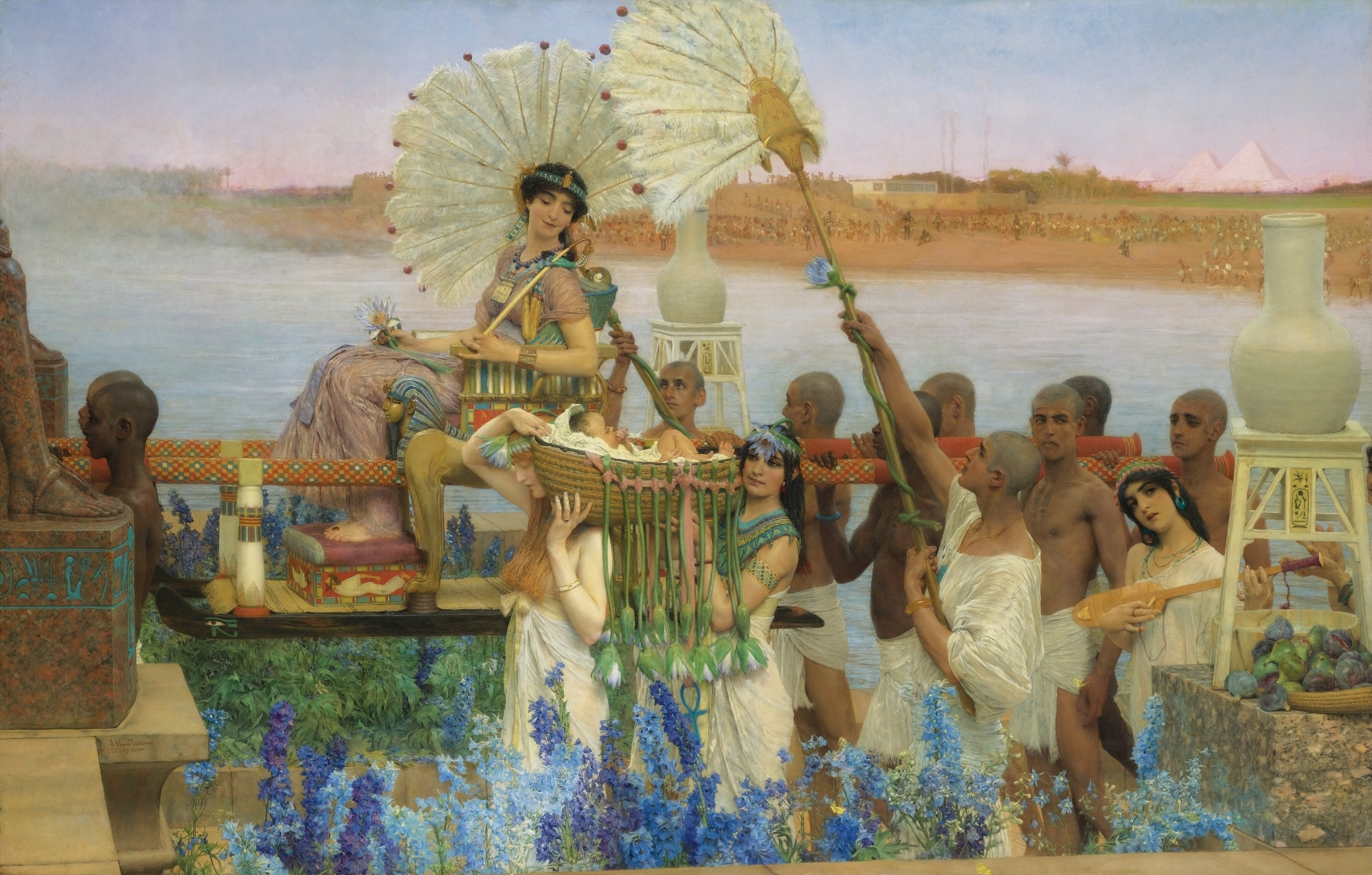
The Finding of Moses (1904 painting by Lawrence Alma-Tadema)

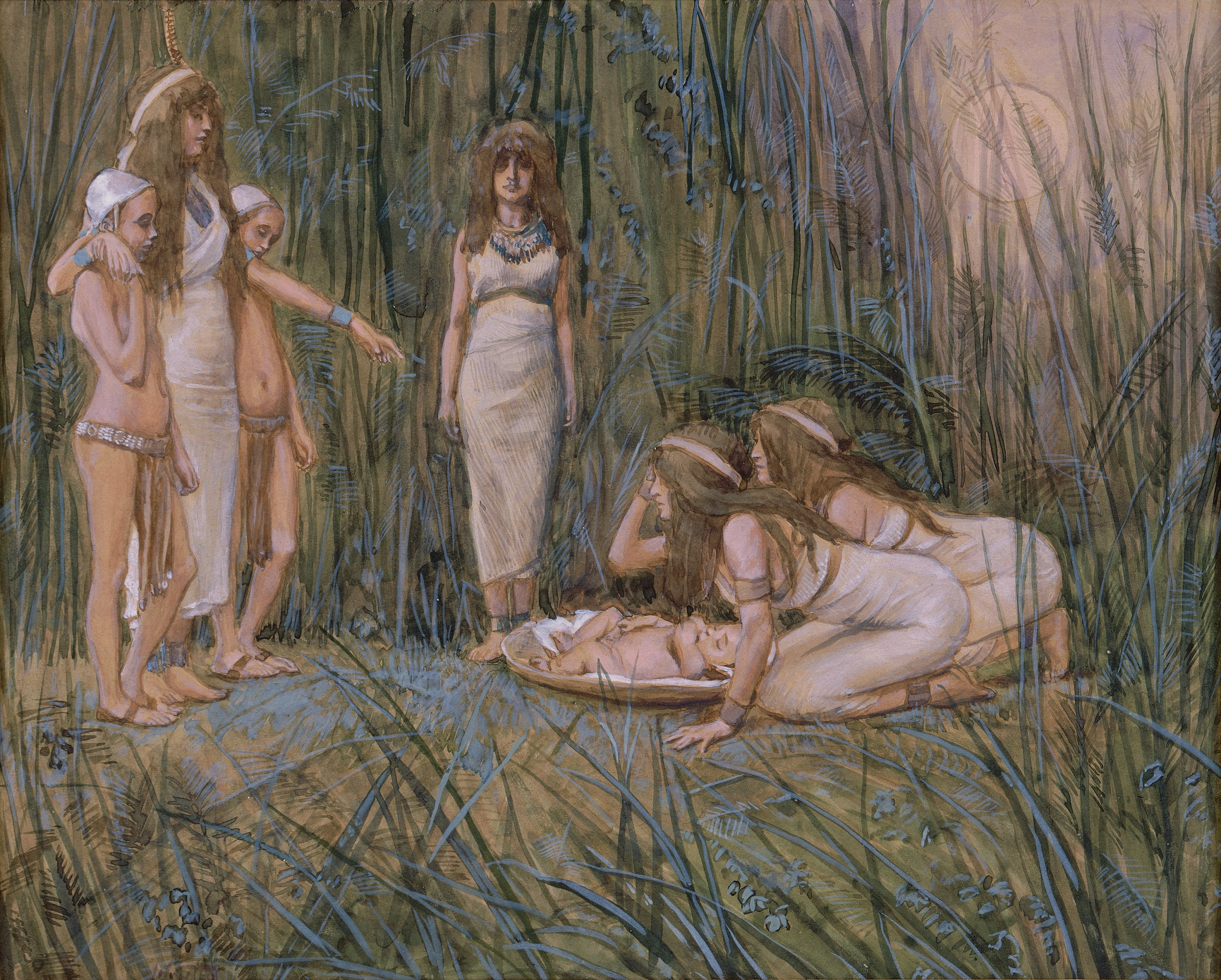
Pharaoh's Daughter Receives the Mother of Moses (watercolor circa 1896–1902 by James Tissot)

=== Second reading—Exodus 1:18–2:10 ===
In the second reading, Pharaoh asked the midwives why they had saved the boys, and the midwives told Pharaoh that the Israelite women were more vigorous than the Egyptian women and delivered before a midwife could get to them. God rewarded the midwives because they feared God, and God made them houses. The Israelites continued to multiply, and Pharaoh charged all his people to cast every newborn boy into the Nile, leaving the girls alive. The second open portion ends here with the end of chapter 1.

As the reading continues with chapter 2, a Levite couple had a baby boy, and the woman hid him for three months. When she could no longer hide him, she made an ark of bulrushes, daubed it with slime and pitch, put the boy inside, and laid it in the river. As his sister watched, Pharaoh's daughter came to bathe in the river, saw the ark, and sent her handmaid to fetch it. She opened it, saw the crying boy, and had compassion on him, recognizing that he was one of the Hebrew children. His sister asked Pharaoh's daughter whether she should call a wet nurse from the Israelite women, and Pharaoh's daughter agreed. The girl called the child's mother, and Pharaoh's daughter hired her to care for the child. When the child grew, his mother brought him to Pharaoh's daughter, who adopted him as her own son, calling him Moses because she had drawn him out of the water. The second reading ends here.

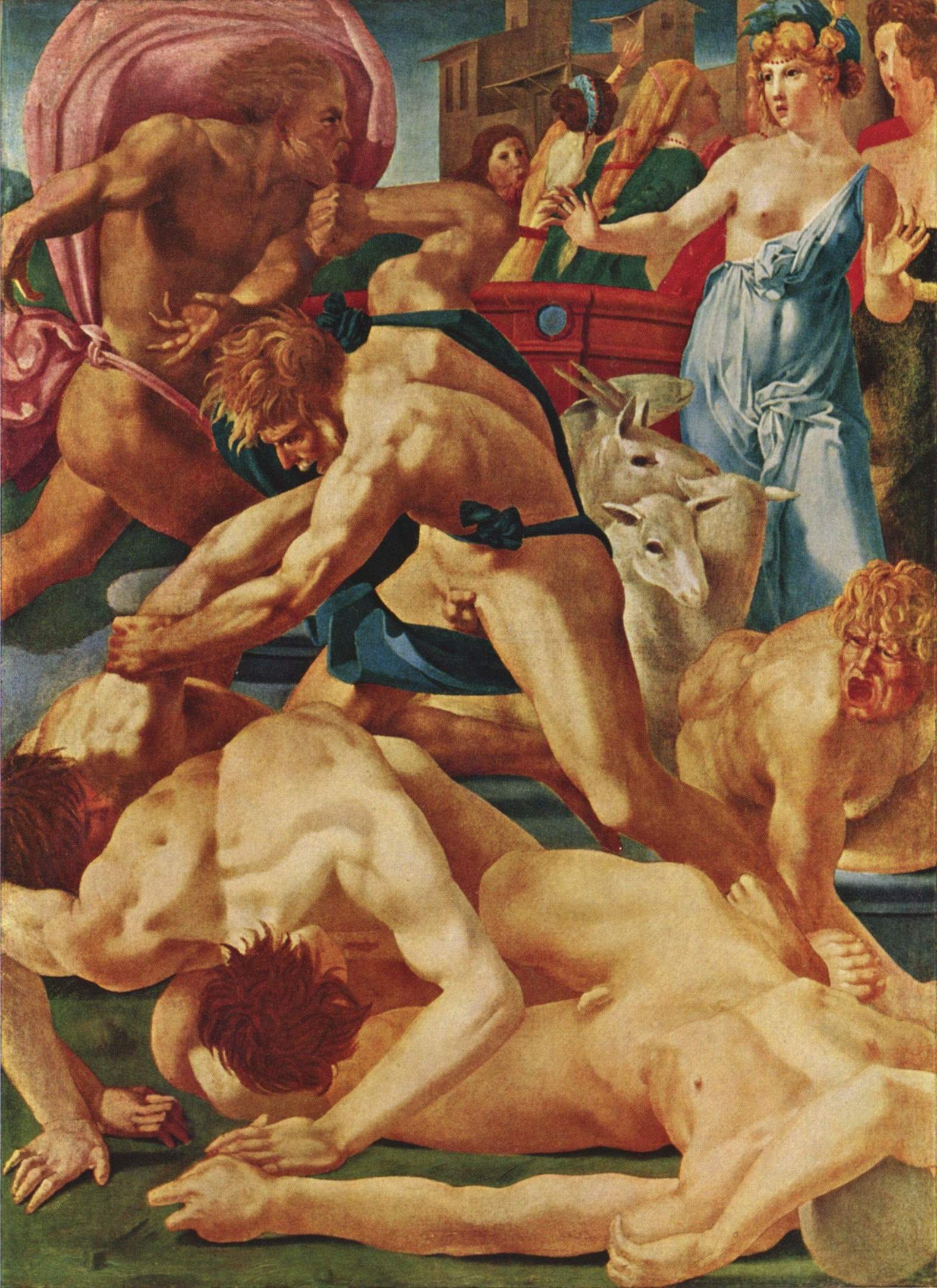
Moses Defending the Daughters of Jethro (painting circa 1523 by Rosso Fiorentino)

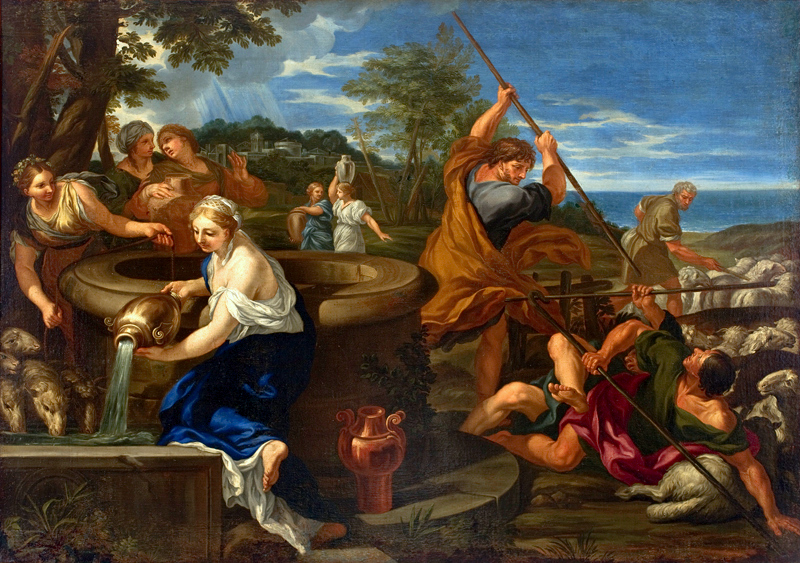
Moses and the Daughters of Jethro (painting circa 1660–1689 by Ciro Ferri)

=== Third reading—Exodus 2:11–25 ===
In the third reading, when Moses grew up, he went to his brethren and saw their burdens. He saw an Egyptian striking an Israelite, he looked this way and that, and when he saw no one, he struck the Egyptian and hid him in the sand. When he went out the next day, he came upon two Hebrew men fighting, and he asked the wrongdoer why he struck his fellow. The man asked Moses who had made him king, asking him whether he intended to kill him as he did the Egyptian, so Moses realized that his deed was known. When Pharaoh heard, he sought to kill Moses, but Moses fled to Midian, where he sat down by a well. The priest of Midian's seven daughters had come to water their father's flock, but shepherds drove them away. Moses stood up and helped the daughters, and watered their flock. When they came home to their father Reuel, he asked how they were able to come home so early, and they explained how an Egyptian had delivered them from the shepherds, and had also drawn water for the flock. Reuel then asked his daughters why they had left the man there, and told them to call him back to join them for a meal. Moses was content to live with the man, and he gave Moses his daughter Zipporah to marry. Moses and Zipporah had a baby boy, whom Moses called Gershom, saying that he had been a stranger in a strange land. The third open portion ends here.

In the continuation of the reading, the Pharaoh died, and the Israelites groaned under their bondage and cried to God, and God heard them and remembered God's covenant with Abraham, Isaac, and Jacob. The third reading and a closed portion end here with the end of chapter 2.

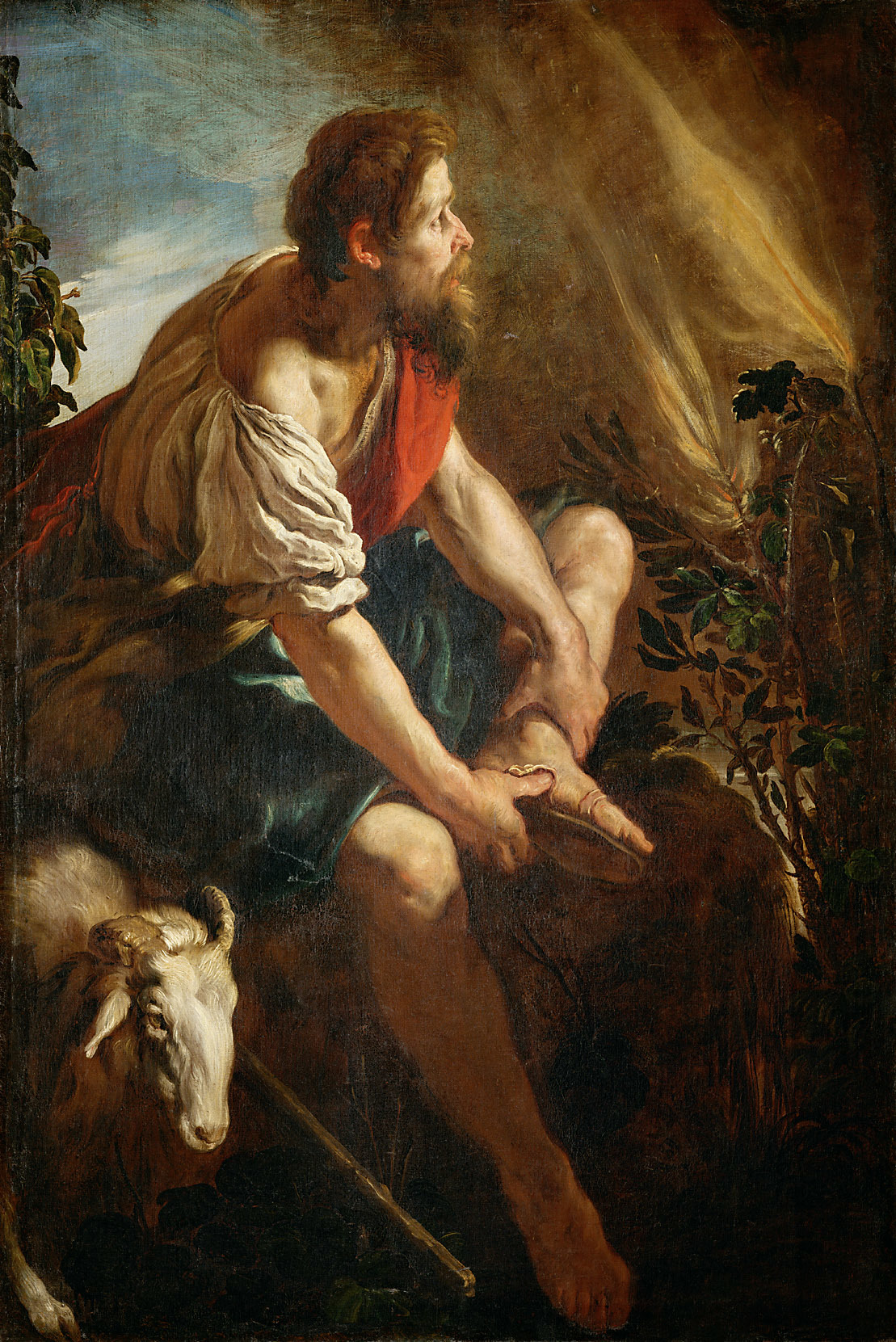
Moses at the Burning Bush (painting circa 1615–1617 by Domenico Fetti)

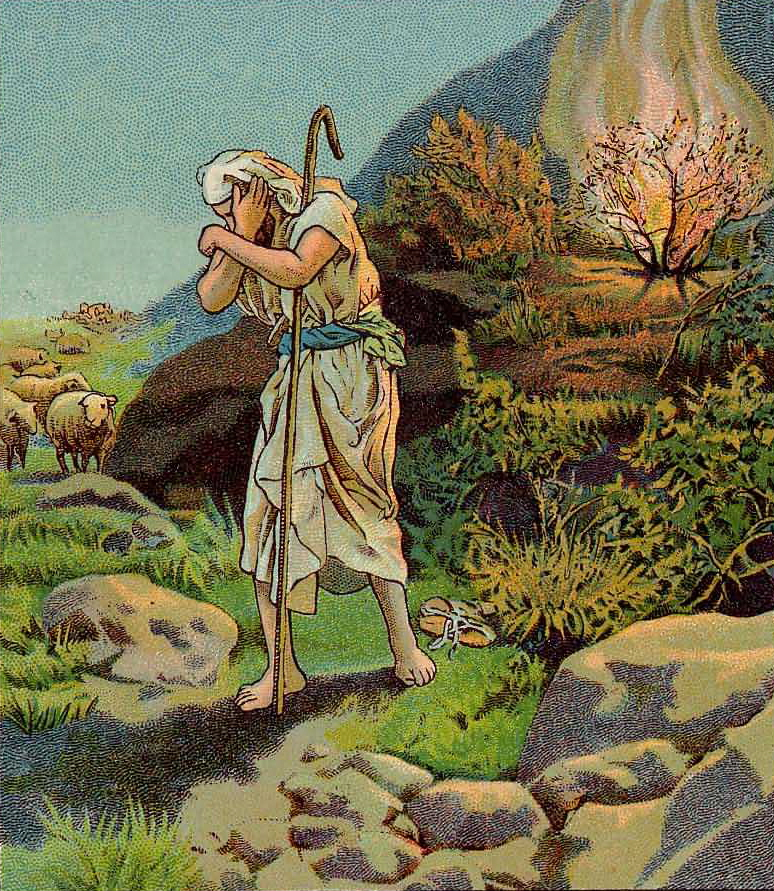
The Call of Moses (illustration from a Bible card published 1900 by the Providence Lithograph Company)

=== Fourth reading—Exodus 3:1–15 ===
In the fourth reading, in chapter 3, when Moses was keeping his father-in-law Jethro's flock at the mountain of God, Horeb (another name for the Biblical Mount Sinai), the angel of God appeared to him in a flame in the midst of a burning bush. God called to Moses from the bush, and Moses answered: "Here I am." God told Moses not to draw near, and to take off his shoes, for the place on which he stood was holy ground. God identified as the God of Abraham, Isaac, and Jacob, reported having seen the Israelites' affliction and heard their cry, and promised to deliver them from Egypt to Canaan, a land flowing with milk and honey. God told Moses that God was sending Moses to Pharaoh to bring the Israelites out of Egypt, but Moses asked who he was that he should do so. God told Moses that God would be with him, and after he brought them out of Egypt, he would serve God on that mountain. Moses asked God whom he should say sent him to the Israelites, and God said "I Will Be What I Will Be" (אֶהְיֶה אֲשֶׁר אֶהְיֶה, Ehyeh-Asher-Ehyeh), and told Moses to tell the Israelites that "I Will Be" (אֶהְיֶה, Ehyeh) sent him. God told Moses to tell the Israelites that the Lord (יְהוָה, YHVH), the God of their fathers, the God of Abraham, Isaac, and Jacob, had sent him, and this would be God's Name forever. The fourth reading ends here.

=== Fifth reading—Exodus 3:16–4:17 ===
In the fifth reading, God directed Moses to tell Israel's elders what God had promised, and predicted that they would heed Moses and go with him to tell Pharaoh that God had met with them and request that Pharaoh allow them to go three days' journey into the wilderness to sacrifice to God. God knew that Pharaoh would not let them go unless forced by a mighty hand, so God would strike Egypt with wonders, and then Pharaoh would let them go. God would make the Egyptians view the Israelites favorably, so that the Israelites would not leave empty handed, but every woman would ask her neighbor for jewels and clothing and the Israelites would strip the Egyptians. Moses predicted that they would not believe him, so God told him to cast his rod on the ground, and it became a serpent, and Moses fled from it. God told Moses to take it by the tail, he did so, and it became a rod again. God explained that this was so that they might believe that God had appeared to Moses. Then God told Moses to put his hand into his bosom, he did, and when he took it out, his hand was leprous, as white as snow. God told him to put his hand back into his bosom, he did, and when he took it out, it had returned to normal. God predicted that if they would not heed the first sign, then they would believe the second sign, and if they would not believe those two signs, then Moses was to take water from the river and pour it on the land, and the water would become blood. Moses protested that he was not a man of words but was slow of speech, but God asked him who had made man's mouth, so Moses should go, and God would teach him what to say. Moses pleaded with God to send someone else, and God became angry with Moses. God said that Moses' well-spoken brother Aaron was coming to meet him, Moses would tell him the words that God would teach them, he would be Moses' spokesman, and Moses would be like God to him. And God told Moses to take his staff with him to perform signs. The fifth reading and the fourth open portion end here.

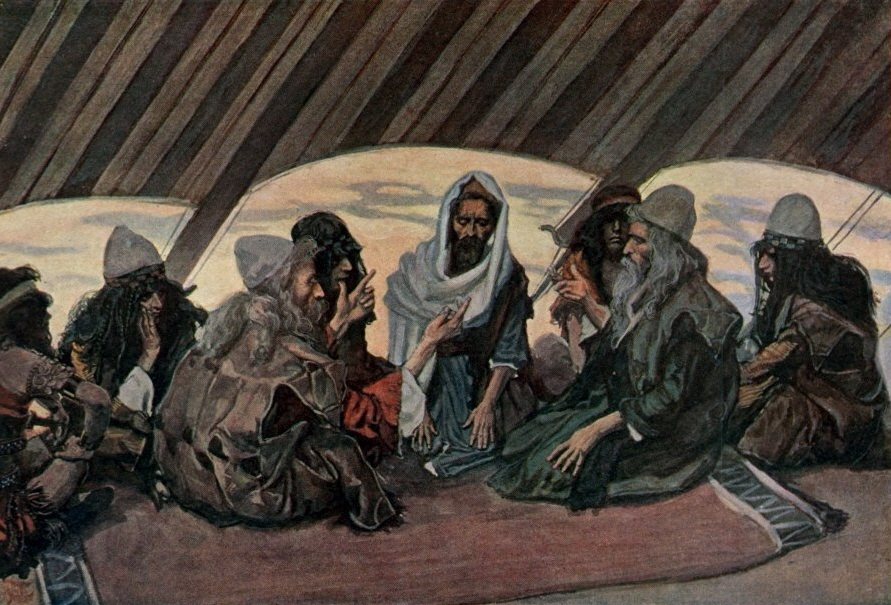
Jethro and Moses (watercolor circa 1896–1902 by James Tissot)

=== Sixth reading—Exodus 4:18–31 ===
In the sixth reading, Moses returned to Jethro and asked him to let him return to Egypt, and Jethro bade him to go in peace. God told Moses that he could return, for all the men who sought to kill him were dead. Moses took his wife and sons and the rod of God and returned to Egypt. God told Moses to be sure to perform for Pharaoh all the wonders that God had put in his hand, but God would harden his heart, and he would not let the people go. And Moses was to tell Pharaoh that Israel was God's firstborn son, and Pharaoh was to let God's son go to serve God, and should he refuse, God would kill Pharaoh's firstborn son. At the lodging-place along the way, God sought to kill him. Then Zipporah took a flint and circumcised her son, and touched his legs with it, saying that he was a bridegroom of blood to her, so God let him alone. The fifth open portion ends here.

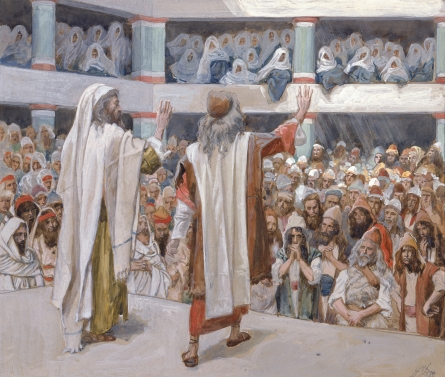
Moses and Aaron Speak to the People (watercolor circa 1896–1902 by James Tissot)

As the reading continues, God told Aaron to go to the wilderness to meet Moses, and he went, met him at the mountain of God, and kissed him. Moses told him all that God had said, and they gathered the Israelite elders and Aaron told them what God had said and performed the signs. The people believed, and when they heard that God had remembered them and seen their affliction, they bowed their heads and worshipped. The sixth reading ends here with the end of chapter 4.

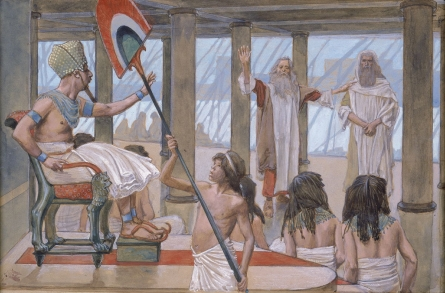
Moses Speaks to Pharaoh (watercolor circa 1896–1902 by James Tissot)

=== Seventh reading—Exodus 5:1–6:1 ===
In the seventh reading, in chapter 5, Moses and Aaron told Pharaoh that God said to let God's people go so that they might hold a feast to God in the wilderness, but Pharaoh asked who God was that he should let Israel go. They said that God had met with them, and asked Pharaoh to let them go three days into the wilderness and sacrifice to God, lest God fall upon them with pestilence or the sword. Pharaoh asked them why they caused the people to rest from their work, and commanded that the taskmasters lay heavier work on them and no longer give them straw to make brick but force them to go and gather straw for themselves to make the same quota of bricks.

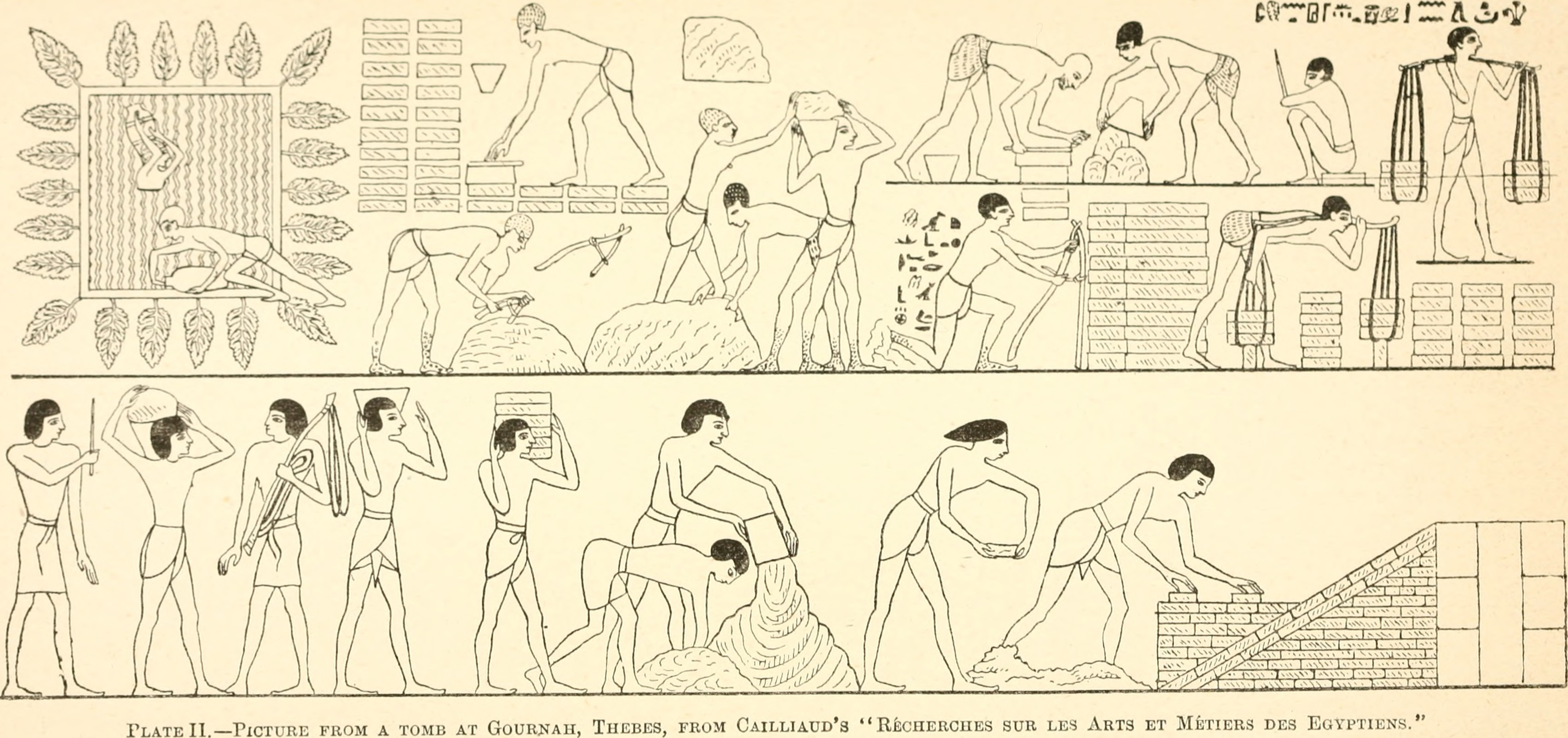
brickmaking in ancient Egypt (illustration after those in Rekhmire’s tomb from the 1881 book The Bible and Science by Thomas Lauder Brunton)

The people scattered to gather straw, and the taskmasters beat the Israelite officers, asking why they had not fulfilled the quota of brick production as before. The Israelites cried to Pharaoh, asking why he dealt so harshly with his servants, but he said that they were idle if they had time to ask to go and sacrifice to God. So the officers met Moses and Aaron as they came from meeting Pharaoh and accused them of making the Israelites to be abhorrent to Pharaoh and his servants and to give them a weapon to kill the people.

In the maftir (מפטיר) reading that concludes the parashah, Moses asked God why God had dealt so ill with the people and why God had sent him, for since he came to Pharaoh to speak in God's name, he had dealt ill with the people, and God had not delivered the people. And God told Moses that now he would see what God would do to Pharaoh, for by a strong hand would he let the people go, and by a strong hand would he drive them out of his land. The seventh reading, a closed portion, and the parashah end here.

=== Readings according to the triennial cycle ===
Jews who read the Torah according to the triennial cycle of Torah reading read the parashah according to the following schedule:

	Year 1	Year 2	Year 3
	January 2023, January 2026, January 2029 . . .	January 2024, January 2027, December 2029 . . .	January 2025, January 2028, January 2031 . . .
Reading	1:1–2:25	3:1–4:17	4:18–6:1
1	1:1–7	3:1–6	4:18–20
2	1:8–12	3:7–10	4:21–26
3	1:13–17	3:11–15	4:27–31
4	1:18–22	3:16–22	5:1–5
5	2:1–10	4:1–5	5:6–9
6	2:11–15	4:6–9	5:10–14
7	2:16–25	4:10–17	5:15–6:1
Maftir	2:23–25	4:14–17	5:22–6:1

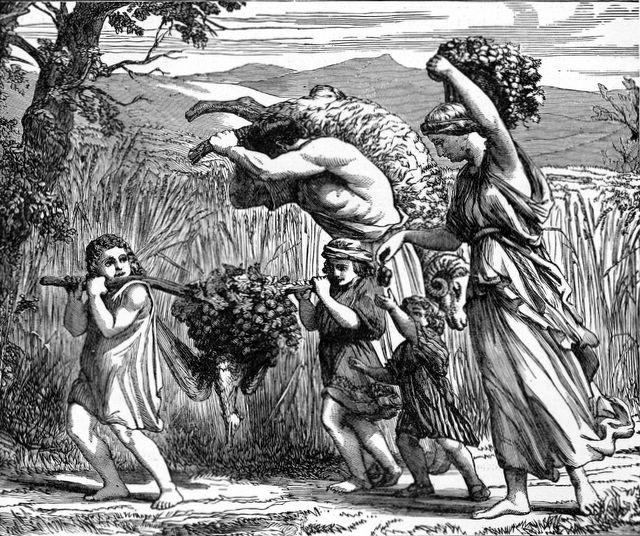
A Land Flowing with Milk and Honey (illustration from Henry Davenport Northrop's 1894 Treasures of the Bible)

== In ancient parallels ==
The parashah has parallels in these ancient sources:

=== Exodus chapter 3 ===
Exodus 3:8 and 17, 13:5, and 33:3, Leviticus 20:24, Numbers 13:27 and 14:8, and Deuteronomy 6:3, 11:9, 26:9 and 15, 27:3, and 31:20 describe the Land of Israel as a land flowing "with milk and honey." Similarly, the Middle Egyptian (early second millennium BCE) tale of Sinuhe described the Land of Israel or, as the Egyptian tale called it, the land of Yaa: "It was a good land called Yaa. Figs were in it and grapes. It had more wine than water. Abundant was its honey, plentiful its oil. All kind of fruit were on its trees. Barley was there and emmer, and no end of cattle of all kinds."

== In inner-Biblical interpretation ==
The parashah has parallels or is discussed in these Biblical sources:

=== Exodus chapter 1 ===
The report of Exodus 1:7 that the Israelites were fruitful and multiplied echoes Genesis 47:27.

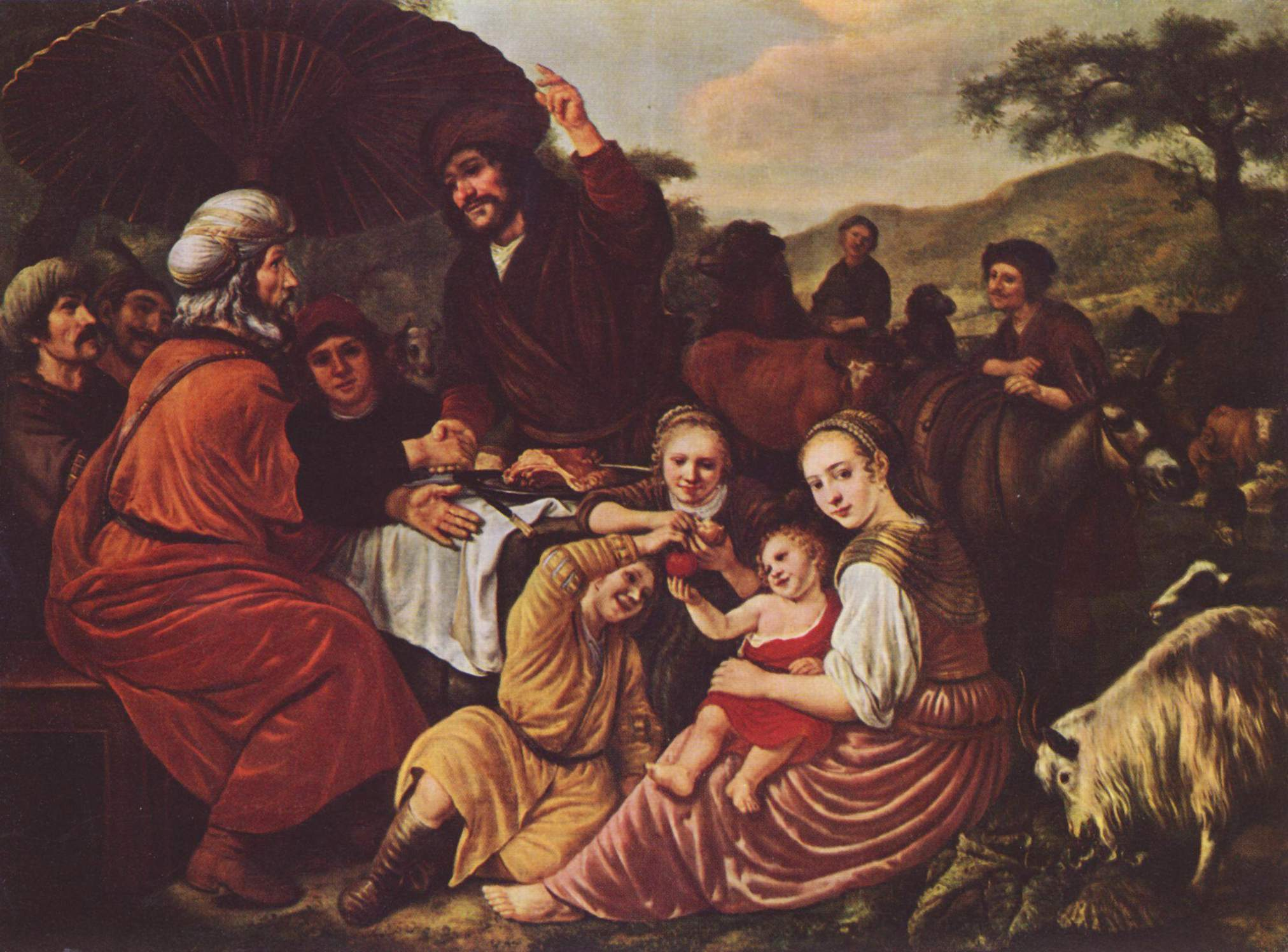
Moses and Jethro (painting circa 1635 by Jan Victors)

=== Exodus chapter 2 ===
The meeting of Moses and Zipporah at the well in Exodus 2:15–21 is the Torah's third of several meetings at watering holes that lead to marriage. Also of the same type scene are Abraham's servant's meeting (on behalf of Isaac) of Rebekah at the well in Genesis 24:11–27 and Jacob's meeting of Rachel at the well in Genesis 29:1–12. Each involves (1) a trip to a distant land, (2) a stop at a well, (3) a young woman coming to the well to draw water, (4) a heroic drawing of water, (5) the young woman going home to report to her family, (6) the visiting man brought to the family, and (7) a subsequent marriage.

Robert Wilson noted that the language Exodus 2:23 and 3:7–9 use to report God's deliverance of Israel from Egypt is echoed in the language 1 Samuel 9:16 uses to report Saul’s elevation.

In Exodus 2:24 and 6:5–6, God remembered God's covenant with Abraham, Isaac, and Jacob to deliver the Israelites from Egyptian bondage. Similarly, God remembered Noah to deliver him from the flood in Genesis 8:1; God promised to remember God's covenant not to destroy the Earth again by flood in Genesis 9:15–16; God remembered Abraham to deliver Lot from the destruction of Sodom and Gomorrah in Genesis 19:29; God remembered Rachel to deliver her from childlessness in Genesis 30:22; Moses called on God to remember God's covenant with Abraham, Isaac, and Jacob to deliver the Israelites from God's wrath after the incident of the Golden Calf in Exodus 32:13 and Deuteronomy 9:27; God promises to "remember" God's covenant with Jacob, Isaac, and Abraham to deliver the Israelites and the Land of Israel in Leviticus 26:42–45; the Israelites were to blow upon their trumpets to be remembered and delivered from their enemies in Numbers 10:9; Samson called on God to deliver him from the Philistines in Judges 16:28; Hannah prayed for God to remember her and deliver her from childlessness in 1 Samuel 1:11 and God remembered Hannah's prayer to deliver her from childlessness in 1 Samuel 1:19; Hezekiah called on God to remember Hezekiah's faithfulness to deliver him from sickness in 2 Kings 20:3 and Isaiah 38:3; Jeremiah called on God to remember God's covenant with the Israelites to not condemn them in Jeremiah 14:21; Jeremiah called on God to remember him and think of him, and avenge him of his persecutors in Jeremiah 15:15; God promises to remember God's covenant with the Israelites and establish an everlasting covenant in Ezekiel 16:60; God remembers the cry of the humble in Zion to avenge them in Psalm 9:13; David called upon God to remember God's compassion and mercy in Psalm 25:6; Asaph called on God to remember God's congregation to deliver them from their enemies in Psalm 74:2; God remembered that the Israelites were only human in Psalm 78:39; Ethan the Ezrahite called on God to remember how short Ethan's life was in Psalm 89:48; God remembers that humans are but dust in Psalm 103:14; God remembers God's covenant with Abraham, Isaac, and Jacob in Psalm 105:8–10; God remembers God's word to Abraham to deliver the Israelites to the Land of Israel in Psalm 105:42–44; the Psalmist calls on God to remember him to favor God's people, to think of him at God's salvation, that he might behold the prosperity of God's people in Psalm 106:4–5; God remembered God's covenant and repented according to God's mercy to deliver the Israelites in the wake of their rebellion and iniquity in Psalm 106:4–5; the Psalmist calls on God to remember God's word to God's servant to give him hope in Psalm 119:49; God remembered us in our low estate to deliver us from our adversaries in Psalm 136:23–24; Job called on God to remember him to deliver him from God's wrath in Job 14:13; Nehemiah prayed to God to remember God's promise to Moses to deliver the Israelites from exile in Nehemiah 1:8; and Nehemiah prayed to God to remember him to deliver him for good in Nehemiah 13:14–31.

=== Exodus chapter 4 ===
The Hebrew Bible reports skin disease (צָּרַעַת, tzara'at) and a person affected by skin disease (מְּצֹרָע, metzora) at several places, often (and sometimes incorrectly) translated as "leprosy" and "a leper." In Exodus 4:6, to help Moses to convince others that God had sent him, God instructed Moses to put his hand into his bosom, and when he took it out, his hand was "leprous (מְצֹרַעַת, m'tzora'at), as white as snow." In Leviticus 13–14, the Torah sets out regulations for skin disease (צָּרַעַת, tzara'at) and a person affected by skin disease (מְּצֹרָע, metzora). In Numbers 12:10, after Miriam spoke against Moses, God's cloud removed from the Tent of Meeting and "Miriam was leprous (מְצֹרַעַת, m'tzora'at), as white as snow." In Deuteronomy 24:8–9, Moses warned the Israelites in the case of skin disease (צָּרַעַת, tzara'at) diligently to observe all that the priests would teach them, remembering what God did to Miriam. In 2 Kings 5:1–19 (part of the haftarah for parashah Tazria), the prophet Elisha cures Naaman, the commander of the army of the king of Aram, who was a "leper" (מְּצֹרָע, metzora). In 2 Kings 7:3–20 (part of the haftarah for parashah Metzora), the story is told of four "leprous men" (מְצֹרָעִים, m'tzora'im) at the gate during the Arameans' siege of Samaria. And in 2 Chronicles 26:19, after King Uzziah tried to burn incense in the Temple in Jerusalem, "leprosy (צָּרַעַת, tzara'at) broke forth on his forehead."

== In early nonrabbinic interpretation ==
The parashah has parallels or is discussed in these early nonrabbinic sources:

=== Exodus chapter 1 ===
Philo explained that Pharaoh ordered that girl babies be allowed to live, because women were disinclined and unfit for war, and Pharaoh ordered that boy babies be destroyed, because an abundance of men could be "a fortress difficult to take and difficult to destroy".

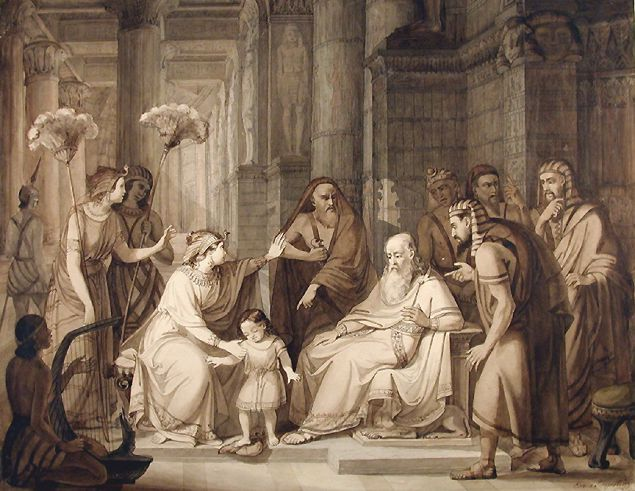
Moses Trampling on Pharaoh's Crown (1846 illustration by Enrico Tempestini)

=== Chapter 2 ===
Josephus reported that Pharaoh's daughter, named Thermuthis, saw Moses to be so remarkable a child that she adopted him as her son, having no child of her own. Once she carried Moses to her father Pharaoh, showed Moses to Pharaoh, and said that she thought to make Moses her successor, if she should have no legitimate child of her own. Pharaoh's daughter said that Moses was of a divine form and a generous mind, that she had received him from the river, and that she thought it proper to adopt him and make him the heir of Pharaoh's kingdom. She put the child into Pharaoh's hands, and Pharaoh hugged him and on his daughter's account, in a pleasant way, put his crown on the child’s head. But Moses threw the crown down on the ground and stepped on it. When the scribe saw this, he tried to kill Moses, crying that this child was the one foretold, that if the Egyptians killed him, they would no longer be in danger. The scribe said that Moses himself attested to the prediction by trampling on Pharaoh's crown. The scribe called on Pharaoh to take Moses away and deliver the Egyptians from fear. But Pharaoh's daughter prevented the scribe and snatched Moses away. And Pharaoh did not order Moses killed, for God inclined Pharaoh to spare him.

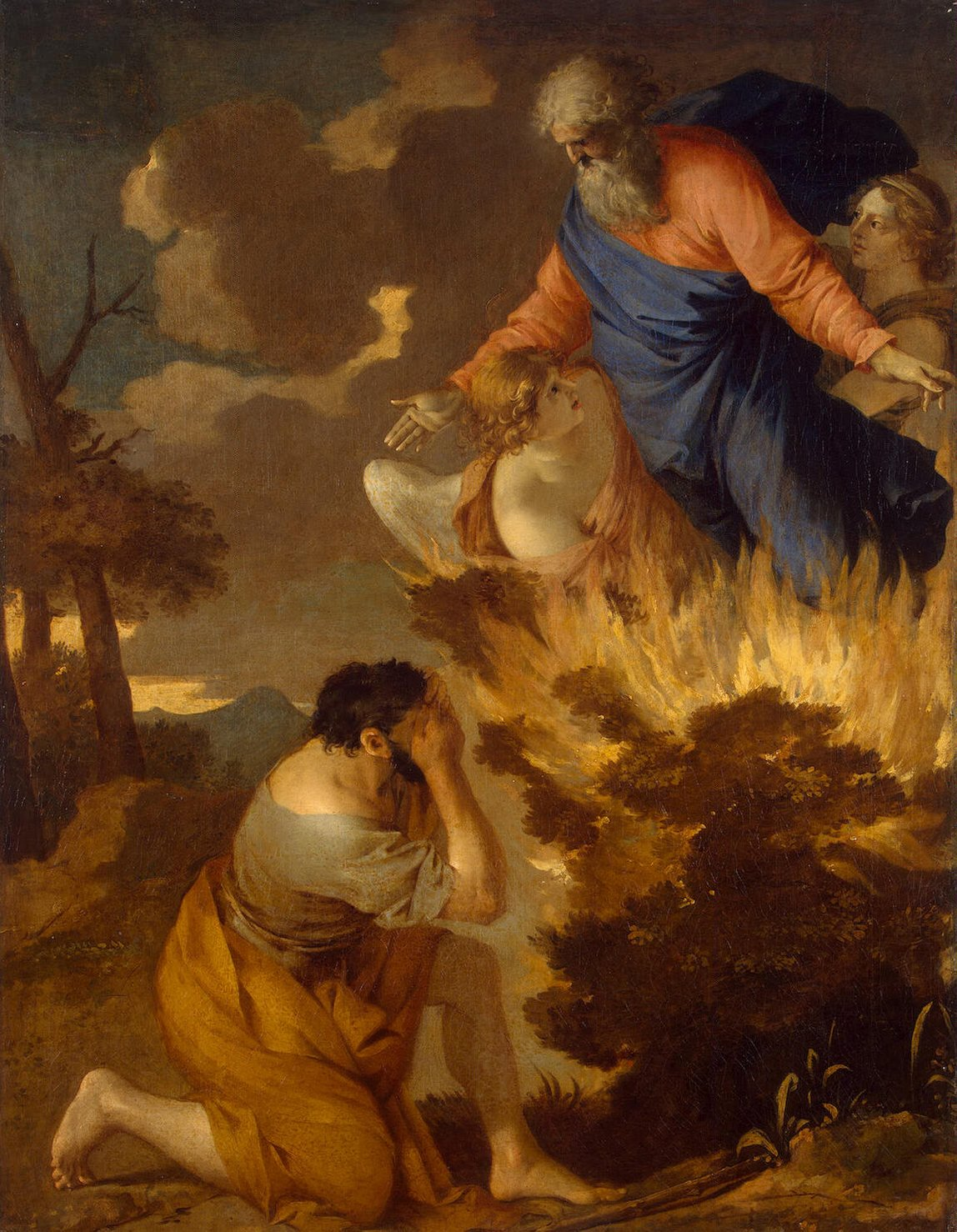
The Burning Bush (17th-century painting by Sébastien Bourdon at the Hermitage Museum)

=== Chapter 3 ===
Philo told that when Moses was leading his flock, he came upon a grove in a valley, where he saw a bush that was suddenly set ablaze without anyone setting fire to it. Being entirely enveloped by the flame, as though the fire proceeded from a fountain showering fire over it, it nevertheless remained whole without being consumed, as if it were taking the fire for its own fuel. In the middle of the flame there was a beautiful form, a most Godlike image, emitting a light more brilliant than fire, which anyone might have imagined to be the image of the living God. But Philo said to call it an angel, because it merely related the events which were about to happen in a silence more distinct than any voice. For the burning bush was a symbol of the oppressed people, and the burning fire was a symbol of the oppressors. And the circumstance of the burning bush not being consumed symbolized that the people thus oppressed would not be destroyed by those who were attacking them, but that their hostility would be unsuccessful and fruitless. The angel was the emblem of the Providence of God.

== In classical rabbinic interpretation ==
The parashah is discussed widely by the Rabbis and other scholars in classical Rabbinic literature, including the Mishnah, Talmud, and Midrash.

=== Exodus chapter 1 ===
Rabbi Shimon bar Yochai interpreted 1 Samuel 2:27 to show that the Shekhinah accompanied the Israelites during their exile in Egypt, highlighting their beloved status before God.

A midrash deduced from the words "these are the names of the sons of Israel" in Exodus 1:1 that Israel is equal in importance to God with the Host of Heaven. Exodus 1:1 includes the word "names", and Psalm 147:4 also uses "names" to refer to the stars, saying of God, "He counts the number of the stars; He gives them all their names." So, God counted their number when Israel and his entourage came to Egypt. Because they were likened to stars, God called them all by their names. Hence, Exodus 1:1 says, "These are the names."

The Sifre asked why Exodus 1:5 makes special note of Joseph, saying, "Joseph was in Egypt already," when the reader would already know this. The Sifre explained that Scripture meant thereby to tell of Joseph's righteousness. Joseph was shepherding Jacob's flock, and even though Pharaoh made Joseph like a king in Egypt, he remained Joseph in his righteousness.

As Exodus 1:6 reports that "Joseph died, and all his brethren," a midrash reports that the Rabbis concluded that Joseph died before his brothers. Rabbi Judah haNasi taught that Joseph died before his brothers because Joseph "commanded his servants, the physicians, to embalm his father" (as Genesis 50:2 reports). But the Rabbis taught that Jacob had directed his sons to embalm him, as Genesis 50:12 reports that "his sons did to him as he commanded them." According to the Rabbis, Joseph died before his brothers because nearly five times Judah said to Joseph, "Your servant my father, your servant my father" (four times himself in Genesis 44:24, 27, 30, and 31, and once together with his brothers in Genesis 43:48), yet Joseph heard it and kept silent (not correcting Judah to show humility to their father). Alternatively, the Babylonian Talmud reports that Hama bar Hanina son of Rabbi Ḥanina taught that Joseph died before his brothers, as evidenced by the order in Exodus 1:6 because he conducted himself with an air of superiority. Those who did not serve in leadership lived on after he died.

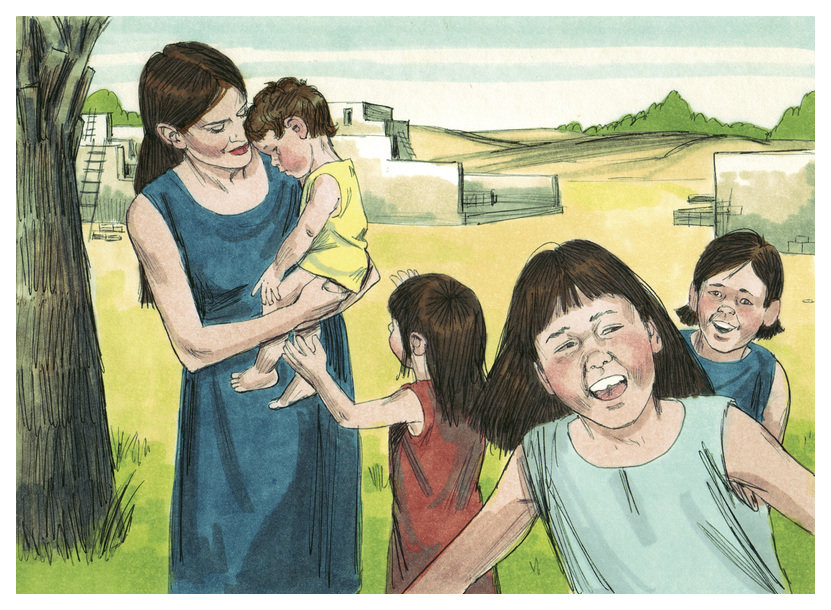
The more the Egyptians oppressed the Israelites, the more the Israelites increased in number. (1984 illustration by Jim Padgett, courtesy of Distant Shores Media/Sweet Publishing)

Reading the report of Exodus 1:7, "the children of Israel were fruitful and increased abundantly," a midrash taught that each woman bore six children at every birth (Exodus 1:7 contains six verbs implying fruitfulness). Another midrash said that each woman bore 12 children at every birth (12 was suggested since all the six hebrew verbs are written in plural), because the word "fruitful" (פָּרוּ, paru) implies two, "multiplied" (וַיִּשְׁרְצוּ,va-yisheretzu) another two, "increased" (וַיִּרְבּוּ, va-yirbu) another two, "grew" (וַיַּעַצְמוּ,va-ye'atzmu) another two, "greatly, greatly" (בִּמְאֹד מְאֹד, bi-me'od me'od) another two, and "the land was filled with them" (וַתִּמָּלֵא הָאָרֶץ אֹתָם, va-timalei ha'aretz otam) another two, making 12 in all. The midrash counseled that the reader should not be surprised, for the scorpion, which the midrash considered one of the swarming things (sheratzim, which is similar to וַיִּשְׁרְצוּ, va-yisheretzu), gives birth to 70 offspring at a time.

The Gemara cited Exodus 1:7 to help demonstrate that God always fulfills God's promises. In Deuteronomy 9:14, God promised Moses, "Leave Me alone; I will destroy them and blot out their name from under heaven; and I will make from you a nation mightier and greater than they." Even though Moses prayed to have the decree to blot out the Israelites' name repealed, and God did nullify that decree, God fulfilled God's promise that Moses' descendants would become a nation mightier and greater than the 600,000 Israelites in the desert. 1 Chronicles 23:15–17 says, "The sons of Moses: Gershom and Eliezer . . . and the sons of Eliezer were Reḥaviya the chief. And Eliezer had no other sons; and the sons of Reḥaviya were very many." And Rav Yosef bar Ḥiyya taught in a baraita that that one can deduce from Scripture's use of the same word "very many" in both 1 Chronicles 23:15–17 and Exodus 1:7 that "very many" means more than 600,000. Regarding Reḥaviya's sons, 1 Chronicles 23:15–17 says they "were very many." And Exodus 1:7 says that "the children of Israel became numerous and multiplied and were very many." Just as when the children of Israel were in Egypt, "very many" meant that there were more than 600,000 of them, Rav Yosef reasoned that so too, the descendants of Moses' descendant Reḥaviya must have numbered more than 600,000.

Rabbi Jeremiah bar Abba saw Exodus 1:7 foreshadowed in the dream of Pharaoh's butler in Genesis 40:10, "And in the vine were three branches; and as it was budding, its blossoms shot forth, and its clusters brought forth ripe grapes." Rabbi Jeremiah taught that "vine" referred to the Jewish people, as Psalm 80:9 says, "You plucked up a vine out of Egypt; You drove out the nations and planted it." And Rabbi Jeremiah read the words of Genesis 40:10, "and as it was budding, its blossoms shot forth," to foretell the time that Exodus 1:7 reports when the Jewish people would be fruitful and multiply.

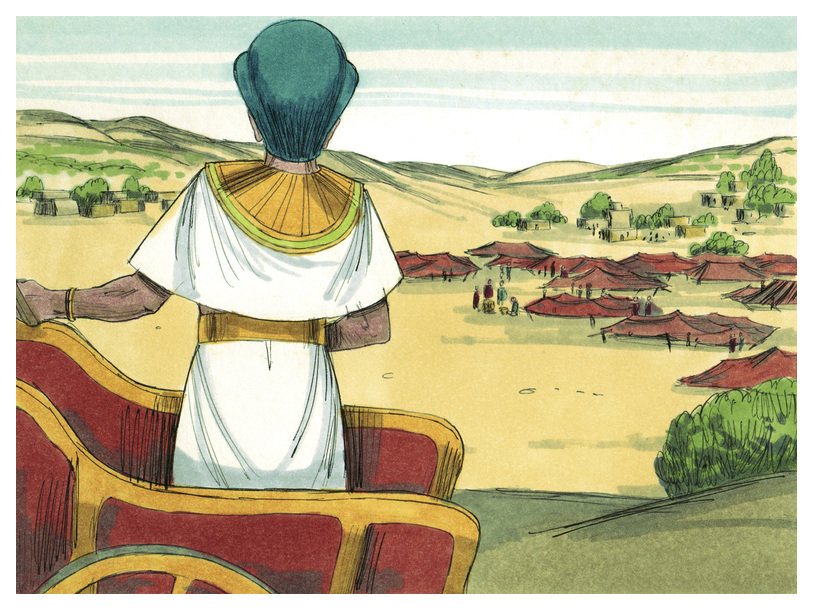
Then a new king, or Pharaoh, came to power in Egypt. (1984 illustration by Jim Padgett, courtesy of Distant Shores Media/Sweet Publishing)

The Tosefta deduced from Exodus 1:7 that as long as Joseph and his brothers were alive, the Israelites enjoyed greatness and honor, but after Joseph died (as reported in Exodus 1:6), a new Pharaoh arose who took counsel against the Israelites (as reported in Exodus 1:8–10).

Rav and Samuel differed in their interpretation of Exodus 1:8. One said that the "new" Pharaoh, who did not know Joseph, really was a different person, reading the word "new" literally. The other said that only Pharaoh's decrees were new, as nowhere does the text state that the former Pharaoh died, and the new Pharaoh reigned in his stead. The Gemara interpreted the words "Who knew not Joseph" in Exodus 1:8 to mean that he issued decrees against the Israelites as if he did not know of Joseph.

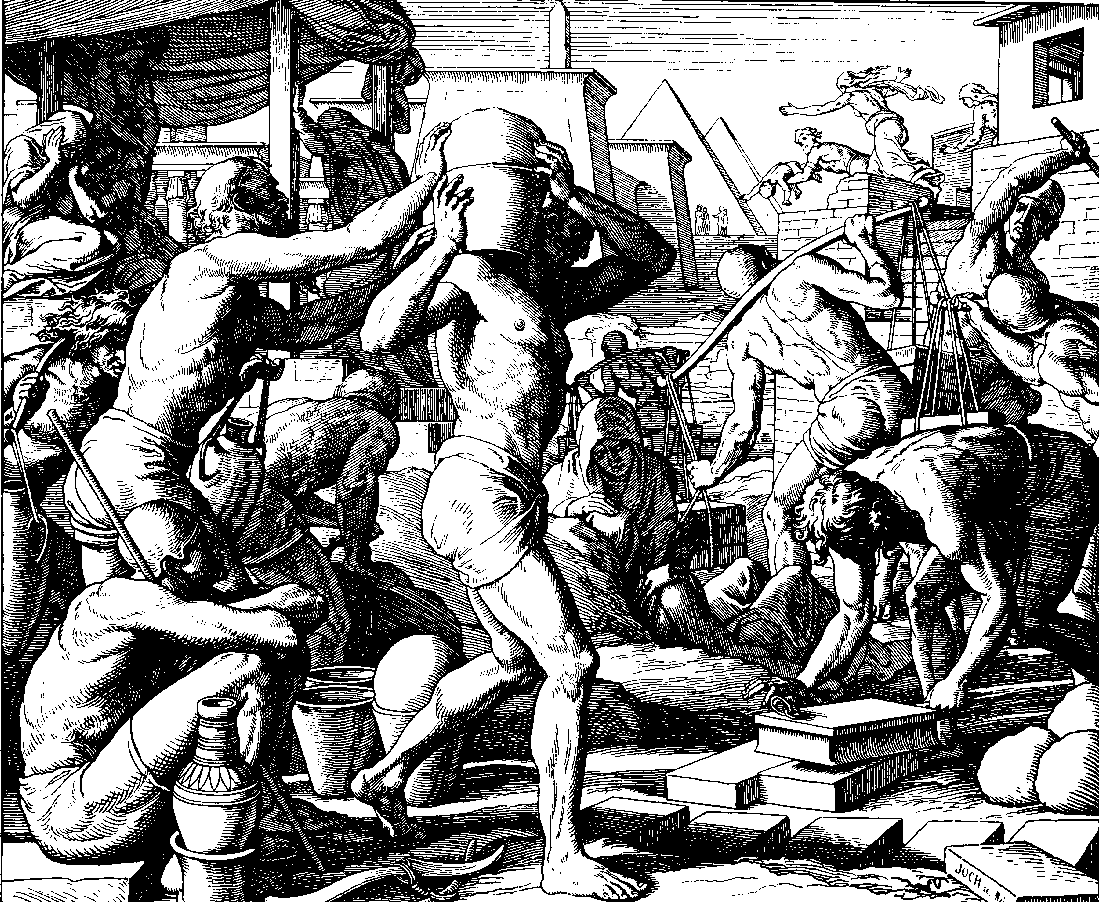
The Egyptians Afflicted the Israelites with Burdens (woodcut by Julius Schnorr von Carolsfeld from the 1860 Die Bibel in Bildern)

==== The Israelites' affliction ====
The Tosefta deduced from Exodus 1:8 that Pharaoh began to sin first before the people, and thus God struck him first, but the rest did not escape. Similarly, a baraita taught that Pharaoh originated the plan against Israel first in Exodus 1:9, and therefore was punished first when in Exodus 7:29, frogs came "upon [him], and upon [his] people, and upon all [his] servants."

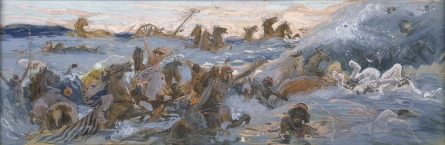
The Egyptians Are Destroyed (watercolor circa 1896–1902 by James Tissot)

The Gemara noted that in Exodus 1:10, Pharaoh said, "Come, let us deal wisely with him," when he should have said "with them." Rabbi Ḥama bar Ḥanina said that Pharaoh meant by that: "Come, let us outwit the Savior of Israel." Pharaoh then considered with what to afflict them. Pharaoh reasoned that if the Egyptians afflicted the Israelites with fire, then Isaiah 66:15–16 indicates that God would punish the Egyptians with fire. If the Egyptians afflicted the Israelites with the sword, then Isaiah 66:16 indicates that God would punish the Egyptians with the sword. Pharaoh concluded that the Egyptians should afflict the Israelites with water, because as indicated by Isaiah 54:9, God had sworn not to bring another flood to punish the world. The Egyptians failed to note that while God had sworn not to bring another flood on the whole world, God could still bring a flood on only one people. Alternatively, the Egyptians failed to note that they could fall into the waters, as indicated by the words of Exodus 14:27, "the Egyptians fled towards it." This all bore out what Rabbi Eleazar said: In the pot in which they cooked, they were themselves cooked—that is, with the punishment that the Egyptians intended for the Israelites, the Egyptians were themselves punished.

Rabbi Hiyya bar Abba said in the name of Rabbi Simai that Balaam, Job, and Jethro stood in Pharaoh's council when he formulated this plan against the Israelites. Balaam devised the plan and was slain; Job acquiesced and was afflicted with sufferings; and Jethro fled Pharaoh's council and thus merited that his descendants should sit in the Hall of Hewn Stones as members of the Sanhedrin.

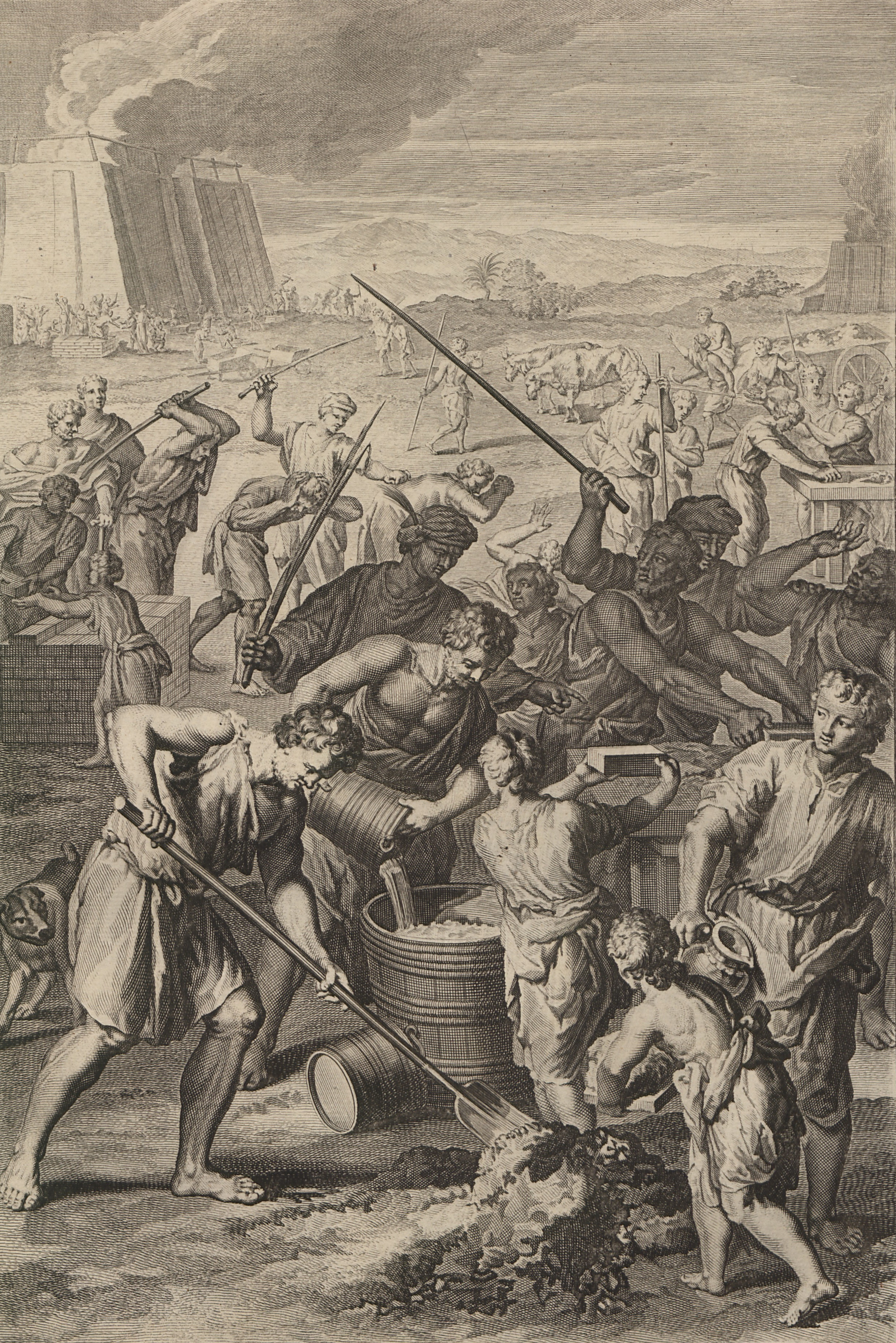
The Israelites' Cruel Bondage in Egypt (illustration from the 1728 Figures de la Bible)

The Gemara questioned why in Exodus 1:10, Pharaoh expressed concern that "when war befalls us," the Israelites would "leave the land." The Gemara reasoned that Pharaoh's concern should have been that "we [the Egyptians] will leave the land." Rabbi Abba bar Kahana concluded that the usage was like that of a man who fears a curse on himself but speaks euphemistically in terms of a curse on somebody else.

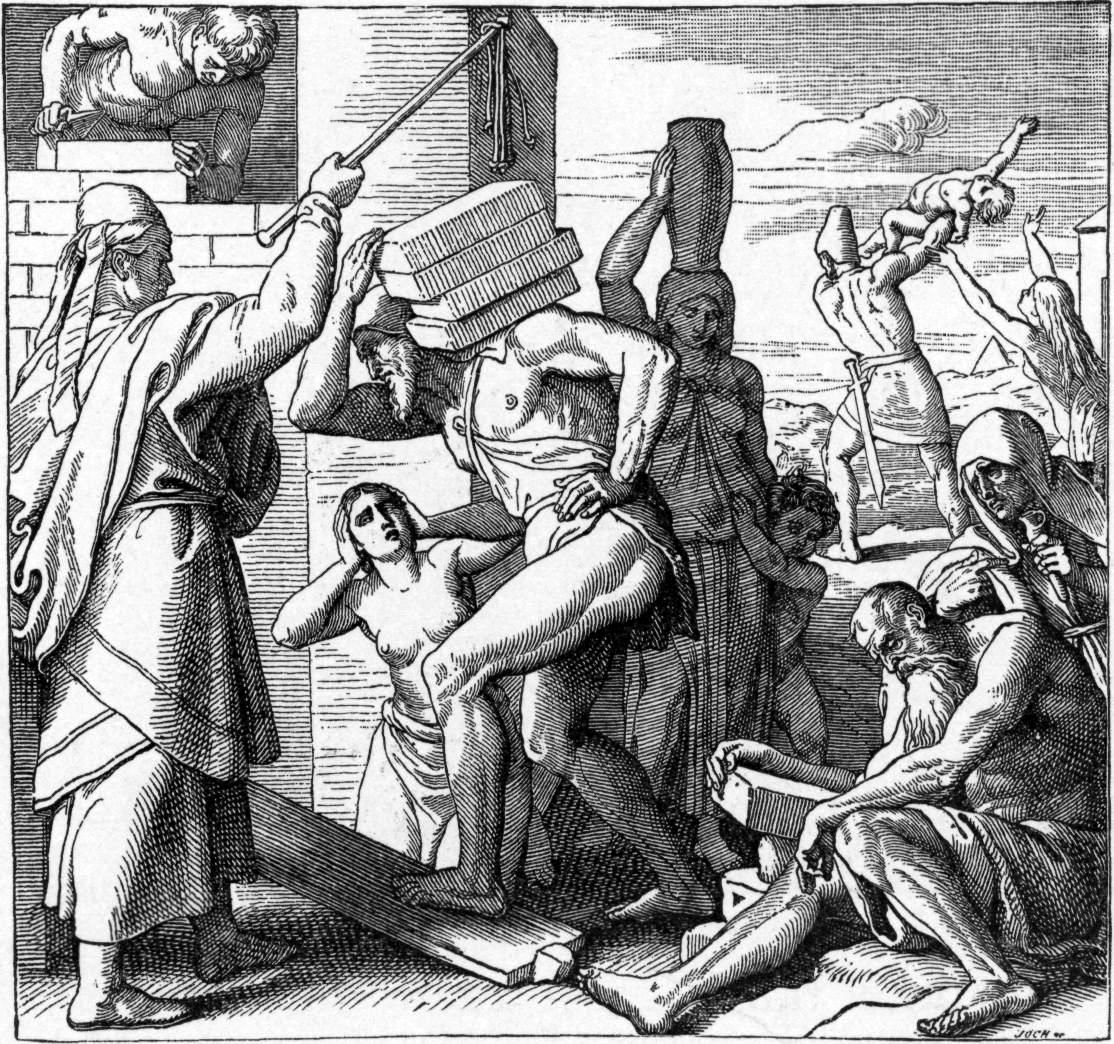
The Egyptians Afflicted the Israelites (illustration from the 1897 Bible Pictures and What They Teach Us by Charles Foster)

The Gemara noted that Exodus 1:11 used the singular in "they set taskmasters over him," when the text should have read "over them." The School of Rabbi Eleazar ben Simeon deduced from this that the Egyptians hung a brick mold round Pharaoh's neck, and whenever an Israelite complained that he was weak, they would ask him, "Are you weaker than Pharaoh?" The Gemara thus noted the similarity between the Hebrew word "taskmasters" ("missim") and something that forms ("mesim").

The Gemara noted that Exodus 1:11 used the singular in "to afflict him with their burdens," when the text should have read "them." The Gemara deduced from this that the verse foretold that Pharaoh would be afflicted with the burdens of Israel.

Rav and Samuel differed in their interpretation of the words in Exodus 1:11, "and they built for Pharaoh store cities (miskenot)." One said that they were called that because they endangered (mesakkenot) their owners, while the other said it was because they impoverished (memaskenot) their owners, for a master had declared that whoever occupies himself with building becomes impoverished.

Rav and Samuel differed in their interpretation of the names "Pithom and Raamses" in Exodus 1:11. One said that the single city's real name was Pithom, but it was called Raamses because one building after another collapsed (mitroses). The other said that its real name was Raamses, but it was called Pithom because the mouth of the deep (pi tehom) swallowed up one building after another.

The Gemara questioned why the words "the more they afflicted him, the more he will multiply and the more he will spread abroad" in Exodus 1:12 were not expressed in the past tense as "the more they multiplied and the more they spread abroad." Resh Lakish interpreted the verse to teach that at the time, the Divine Spirit foretold to them that this would be the result of the affliction.

The Gemara interpreted the words "And they were grieved (wa-yakuzu) because of the children of Israel" in Exodus 1:12 to teach that the Israelites were like thorns (kozim) in the Egyptians' eyes.

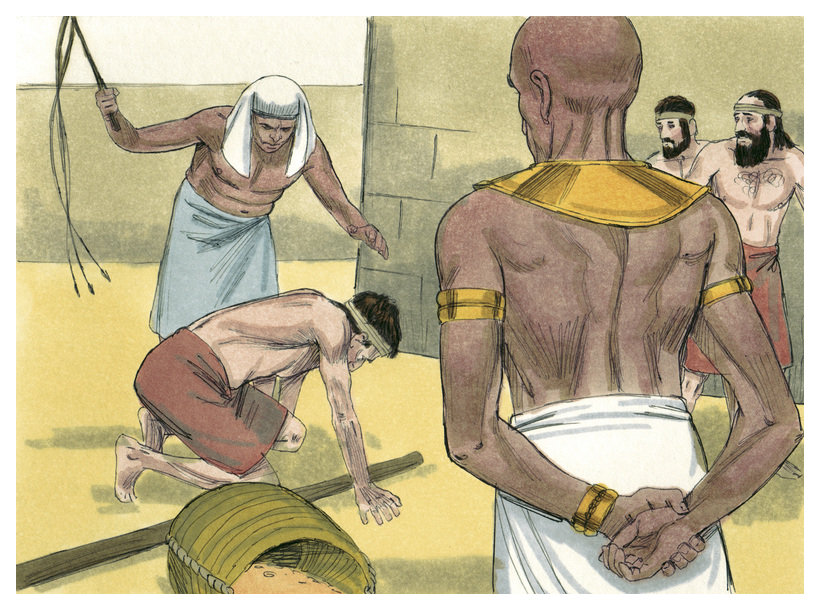
The Egyptians made the lives of the Israelites miserable with hard labor. (1984 illustration by Jim Padgett, courtesy of Distant Shores Media/Sweet Publishing)

Rabbi Eleazar interpreted the words "with rigor (parech)" in Exodus 1:13 to mean that Pharaoh lulled the Israelites into servitude "with a tender mouth (peh rak)." But Rabbi Samuel bar Naḥmani interpreted the words to mean "with rigorous work (perikah)."

Rabbi Ahawa the son of Rabbi Ze'ira taught that just as lettuce is sweet at the beginning (in the leaf) and bitter at the end (in the stalk), so were the Egyptians sweet to the Israelites at the beginning and bitter at the end. The Egyptians were sweet at the beginning, as Genesis 47:6 reports that Pharaoh told Joseph, "The land of Egypt is before you; have your father and brethren dwell in the best of the land." And the Egyptians were bitter at the end, as Exodus 1:14 reports, "And they (the Egyptians) made their (the Israelites') lives bitter."

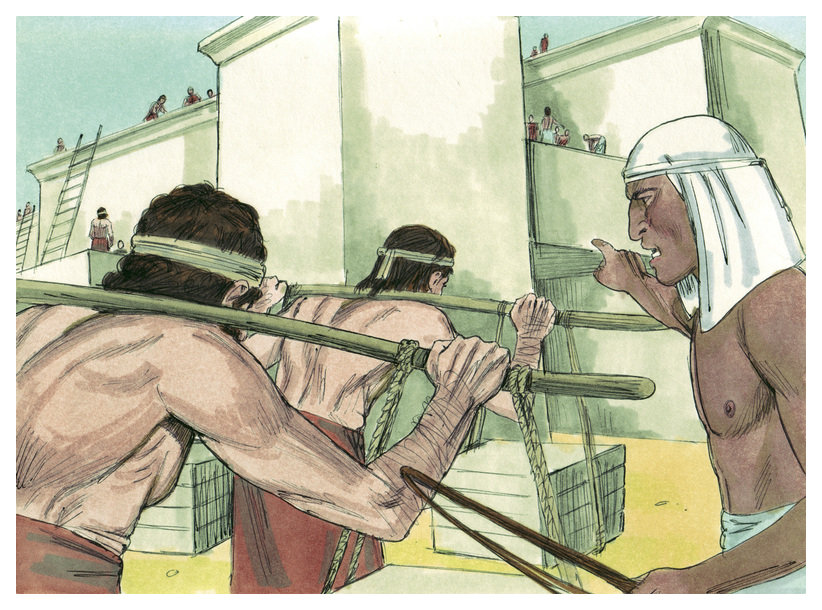
The Egyptians made the Israelites work as slaves in the fields and build cities of brick and mortar. (1984 illustration by Jim Padgett, courtesy of Distant Shores Media/Sweet Publishing)

Rava interpreted Exodus 1:14 to teach that at first, the Egyptians made the Israelites' lives bitter with mortar and brick, but finally it was with all manner of service in the field. Rabbi Samuel bar Naḥmani said in the name of Rabbi Jonathan that the Egyptians assigned men's work to the women and women's work to the men. And even Rabbi Eleazar, who explained "rigor (פָרֶךְ, parech)" as meaning "with tender mouth" in Exodus 1:13 admitted that at the close of Exodus 1:14, פָרֶךְ, parech, meant "with rigorous work."

Finding four instances of the verb "to charge," for example in Exodus 1:22, a midrash taught that Pharaoh decreed upon the Israelites four decrees. At first, he commanded the taskmasters to insist that the Israelites make the prescribed number of bricks. Then he commanded that the taskmasters not allow the Israelites to sleep in their homes, intending by this to limit their ability to have children. The taskmasters told the Israelites that if they went home to sleep, they would lose a few hours each morning from work and never complete the allotted number or bricks, as Exodus 5:13 reports: "And the taskmasters were urgent, saying: ‘Fulfill your work.'" So the Israelites slept on the ground in the brickyard. God told the Egyptians that God had promised the Israelites' ancestor Abraham that God would multiply his children like the stars, as in Genesis 22:17 God promised Abraham: "That in blessing I will bless you, and in multiplying, I will multiply your seed as the stars of the heaven." But now the Egyptians were cunningly planning that the Israelites not increase. So God set about to see that God's word prevail, and immediately Exodus 1:12 reports: "But the more they afflicted them, the more they multiplied." When Pharaoh saw that the Israelites increased abundantly despite his decrees, he then decreed concerning the male children, as Exodus 1:15–16 reports: "And the king of Egypt spoke to the Hebrew midwives . . . and he said: ‘When you do the office of a midwife to the Hebrew women, you shall look upon the birthstool: if it be a son, then you shall kill him.'" So finally (as Exodus 1:22 reports), "Pharaoh charged all his people, saying: 'Every son that is born you shall cast into the river.'"

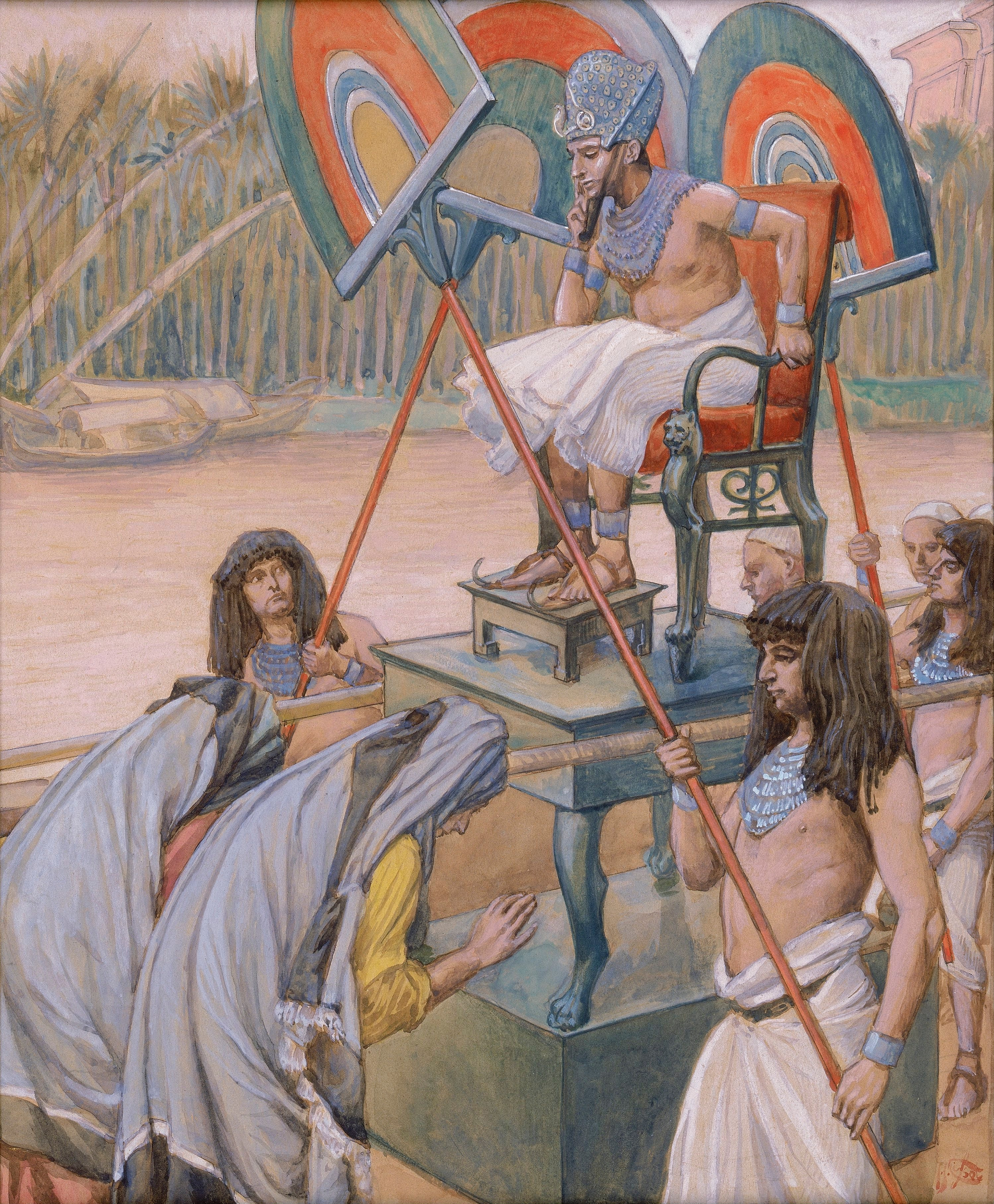
Pharaoh and the Midwives (watercolor circa 1896–1902 by James Tissot)

==== The righteous midwives ====
Rav Awira taught that God delivered the Israelites from Egypt as the reward for the righteous women who lived in that generation. When the righteous women went to draw water, God caused small fish to enter their pitchers. When they drew up their pitchers, they were half full of water and half full of fishes. They set two pots on the fire, one of water and the other of fish. They carried the pots to their husbands in the field. They washed, anointed, and fed them, gave them to drink, and had relations with them among the sheepfolds, as reflected in Psalm 68:14.

The Gemara interpreted Psalm 68:14 to teach that as the reward for lying among the sheepfolds, the Israelites merited the Egyptians' spoils, noting that Psalm 68:14 speaks of "a dove covered with silver, and her pinions with yellow gold."

The Gemara taught that when the Israelite women conceived, they returned to their homes, and when the time for childbirth arrived, they delivered beneath apple trees, as reflected in Song of Songs 8:5. God sent an angel to wash and straighten the babies as a midwife would, as reflected in Ezekiel 16:4. The angel provided the infants cakes of oil and honey, as reflected in Deuteronomy 32:13. When the Egyptians discovered the infants, they came to kill them, but the ground miraculously swallowed up the infants, and the Egyptians plowed over them, as reflected in Psalm 129:3. After the Egyptians departed, the infants broke through the earth like sprouting plants, as reflected in Ezekiel 16:7. When the children grew up, they came in flocks to their homes, as reflected in Ezekiel 16:7 (reading not "ornaments (ba'adi ‘adayim)" but "flocks (be'edre ‘adarim)"). And thus, when God appeared by the sea, they were the first to recognize the Divine, saying in the words of Exodus 15:2, "This is my God and I will praise Him."

Rav and Samuel differed about the identity of the midwives Shiphrah and Puah, to whom Pharaoh spoke in Exodus 1:15. One said that they were mother and daughter, and the other said that they were mother-in-law and daughter-in-law. According to the one who said that they were mother and daughter, they were Jochebed and Miriam; and according to the one who said that they were mother-in-law and daughter-in-law, they were Jochebed and Elisheba, who married Aaron. A baraita taught in accordance with the one who said that they were mother and daughter, teaching that Jochebed was called Shiphrah because she straightened (meshapperet) the limbs of the newborns. Another explanation was that she was called Shiphrah because the Israelites were fruitful (sheparu) and multiplied in her days. Miriam was called Puah because she cried out (po'ah) to the unborn children to bring them out. Another explanation was that she was called Puah because she cried out (po'ah) with the Divine Spirit to say: "My mother will bear a son who will save Israel."

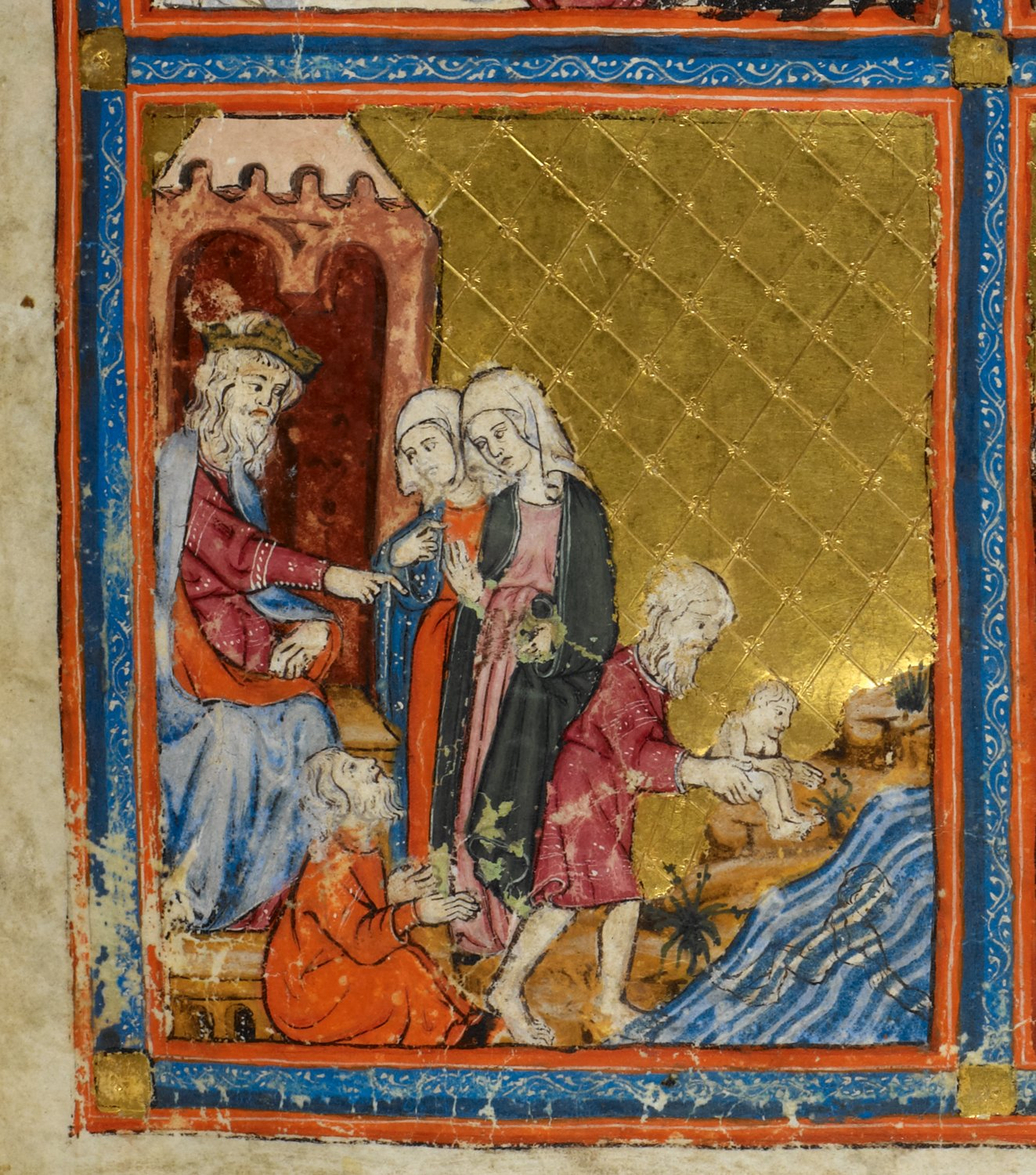
Pharaoh and the Midwives (miniature on vellum from the early 14th century Golden Haggadah, Catalonia)

The Gemara interpreted the words that Pharaoh spoke in Exodus 1:16: "When you do the office of a midwife to the Hebrew women, you shall look upon the birthstool (obnayim). Rabbi Hanan taught that Pharaoh gave the midwives a sign that when a woman bent to deliver a child, her thighs would grow cold like stones (abanim). Another explained that the word obnayim referred to the birthing stool, in accordance with Jeremiah 18:3, which says: "Then I went down to the potter's house, and behold, he was at his work on the stones." Just as a potter would have a thigh on one side, a thigh on the other side, and the block in between, so also a woman giving birth would have a thigh on one side, a thigh on the other side, and the child in between.

Rabbi Hanina deduced from the words "If it is a son, then you shall kill him" in Exodus 1:16 that Pharaoh gave the midwives a sign that when a woman was to give birth to a son, the baby's face was turned downward, and if a daughter, the baby's face was turned upward.

Rabbi Jose son of Rabbi Hanina deduced from the words "to them" in Exodus 1:17 that Pharaoh propositioned the midwives, but they refused him.

A baraita interpreted the words "but saved the boys alive" in Exodus 1:17 to teach that not only did the midwives not kill the boy babies, but they supplied them with water and food.

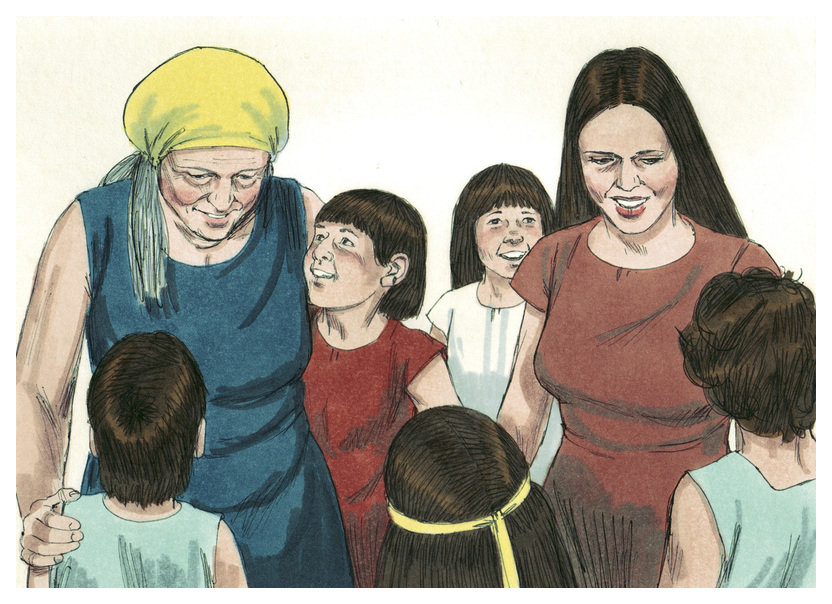
God was pleased with the midwives for not obeying Pharaoh's orders to kill the babies, and He blessed them with families of their own. (1984 illustration by Jim Padgett, courtesy of Distant Shores Media/Sweet Publishing)

The Gemara interpreted the midwives' response to Pharaoh in Exodus 1:19 that the Israelite women "are lively (חָיוֹת, chayot)" to mean that they told him that the Israelites were like animals (חָיוֹת, chayot), for Genesis 49:9 called Judah "a lion's whelp," Genesis 49:17 called Dan "a serpent," Genesis 49:21 called Naphtali "a hind let loose," Genesis 49:14 called Issachar "a strong ass," Deuteronomy 33:17 called Joseph "a firstling bullock," Genesis 49:27 called Benjamin "a wolf that devours," and Ezekiel 19:2 called the mother of all of them "a lioness."

Rav and Samuel differed in their interpretation of the report in Exodus 1:21 that "because the midwives feared God," God "made them houses." One said that God made them the ancestors of the priestly and Levitical houses, as Aaron and Moses were children of Jochebed. And the other said that God made them the ancestors of the royal house of Israel, teaching that Caleb married Miriam, whom 1 Chronicles 2:19 calls Ephrath, and 1 Samuel 17:12 reports that David was the son of an Ephrathite.

The Tosefta deduced from Exodus 1:22 that the Egyptians took pride before God only on account of the water of the Nile, and thus God exacted punishment from them only by water when in Exodus 15:4 God cast Pharaoh's chariots and army into the Reed Sea.

Rabbi Jose son of Rabbi Hanina deduced from the words "Pharaoh charged all his people" in Exodus 1:22 that Pharaoh imposed the same decree on his own people as well as the Israelites. Rabbi Jose thus concluded that Pharaoh made three successive decrees: (1) in Exodus 1:16, Pharaoh decreed "if it be a son, then you shall kill him"; (2) in Exodus 1:22, Pharaoh decreed "every son that is born you shall cast into the river"; and (3) in Exodus 1:22, Pharaoh imposed the same decree upon his own people.

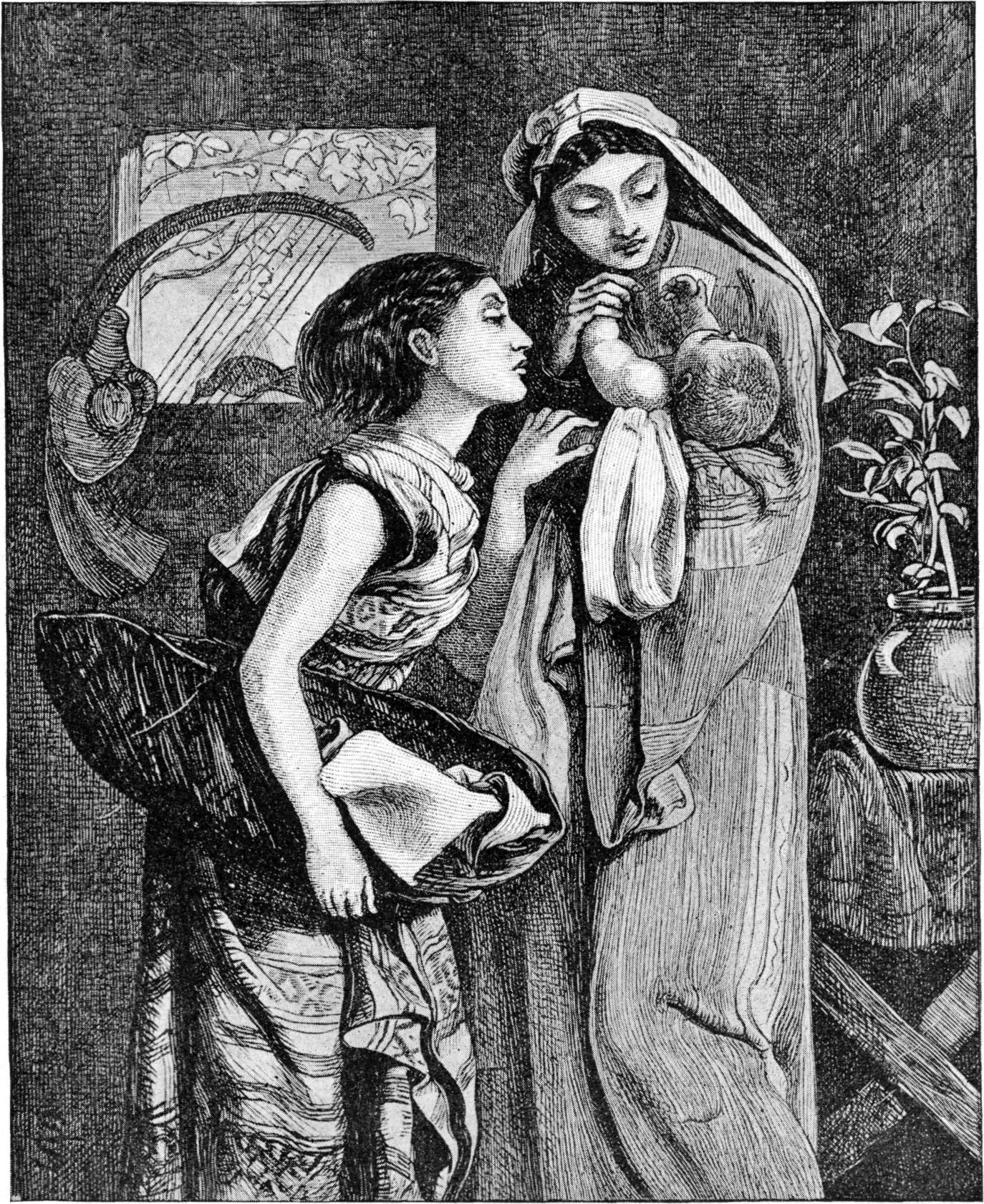
Jocheved, Miriam, and Moses (illustration from the 1897 Bible Pictures and What They Teach Us by Charles Foster)

=== Exodus chapter 2 ===
Reading the words "And there went a man of the house of Levi" in Exodus 2:1, the Gemara asked where he went. Rav Judah bar Zebina taught that he followed the counsel of his daughter. A baraita taught that when Amram heard that Pharaoh had decreed (as reported in Exodus 1:22) that "every son that is born you shall cast into the river," Amram concluded that having children was in vain, he divorced his wife, and all the Israelite men followed suit and divorced their wives. But Amram's daughter told him that his decree was more severe than Pharaoh's, as Pharaoh's decree affected only sons, while Amram's decree affected both sons and daughters. Pharaoh's decree affected only this world, but Amram's decree deprived children of both this world and the world to come. And doubt existed whether Pharaoh's decree would be fulfilled, but because Amram was righteous, it was certain that his decree would be fulfilled. Persuaded by her arguments, Amram took back his wife, and the Israelite men followed suit and took back their wives. The Gemara thus asked why Exodus 2:1 reported that Amram "took to wife" Jochebed when it should have read that he took her back. Rav Judah bar Zebina taught that Amram remarried Jochebed as though it were their first marriage; he seated her in a sedan chair as was the custom for first brides, Aaron and Miriam danced before her, and the ministering angels called her (in the words of Psalm 113:9) "a joyful mother of children."

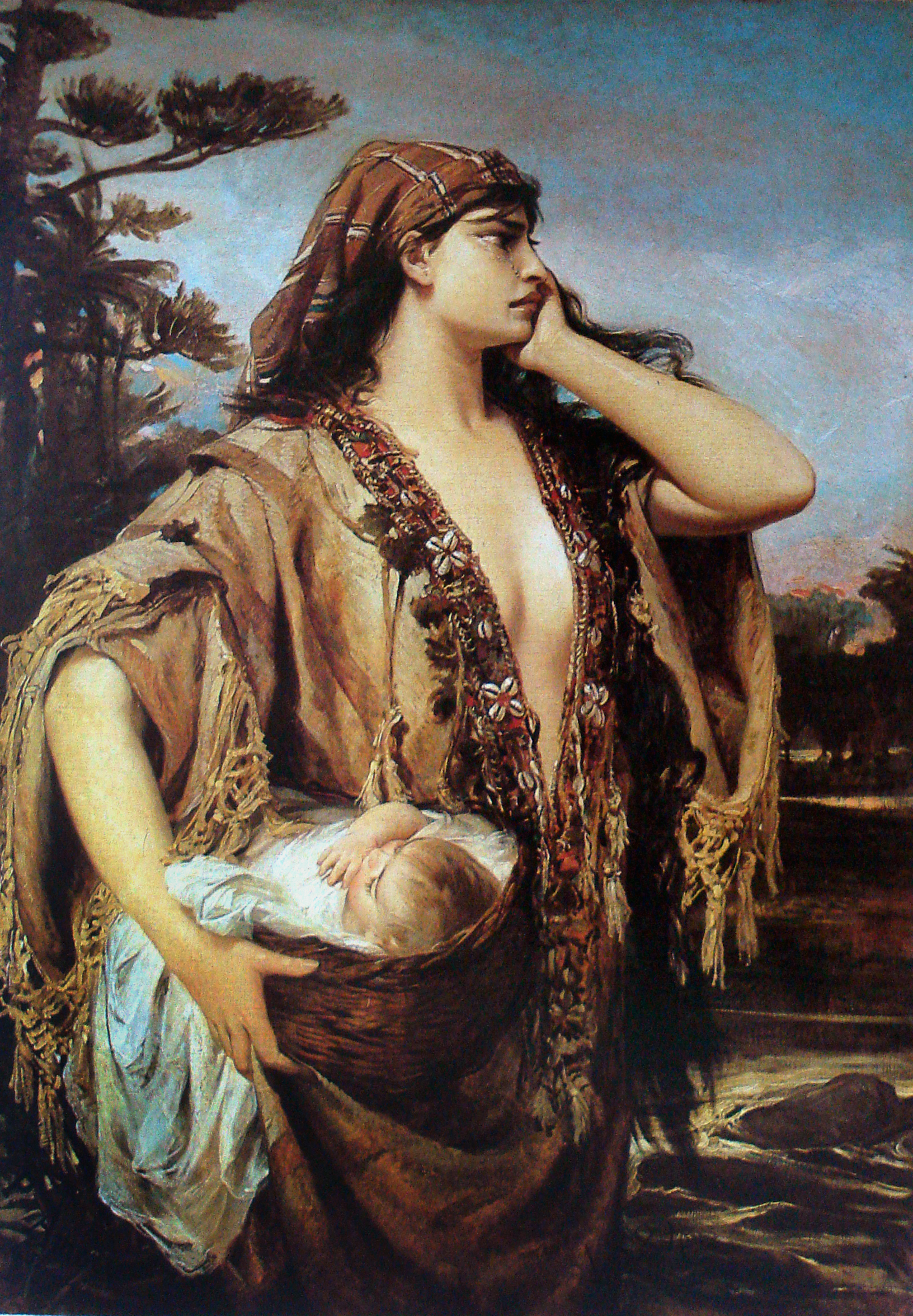
Moses and Jochebed (1884 painting by Pedro Américo)

Reading literally the words "a daughter of Levi" in Exodus 2:1, Rabbi Ḥama bar Ḥanina deduced that Jochebed was conceived during Jacob's family's journey to Egypt (as Genesis 46:8–27 did not list her among those leaving for Egypt) and was born within the walls of Egypt (as Numbers 26:59 reports that Jochebed "was born to Levi in Egypt"). Even though this would thus make her by the Gemara's calculation 130 years old, Rav Judah taught that she was called "a daughter" because the characteristics of a young woman were reborn in her.

Interpreting the words "she hid [the baby] three months" in Exodus 2:2, the Gemara explained that she was able to do this because the Egyptians only counted the time of her pregnancy from the time when Amram and Jochebed were remarried, but by then, she had already been pregnant three months. The Gemara ask how then Exodus 2:2 should report "the woman conceived and bore a son" when she had already been pregnant three months. Rav Judah bar Zebina explained that Exodus 2:2 thus meant to compare Jochebed's delivery of Moses to his conception; as his conception was painless, so was his birth. The Gemara deduced that Providence excluded some righteous women from the decree of Genesis 3:16 on Eve that "in pain you shall bring forth children."

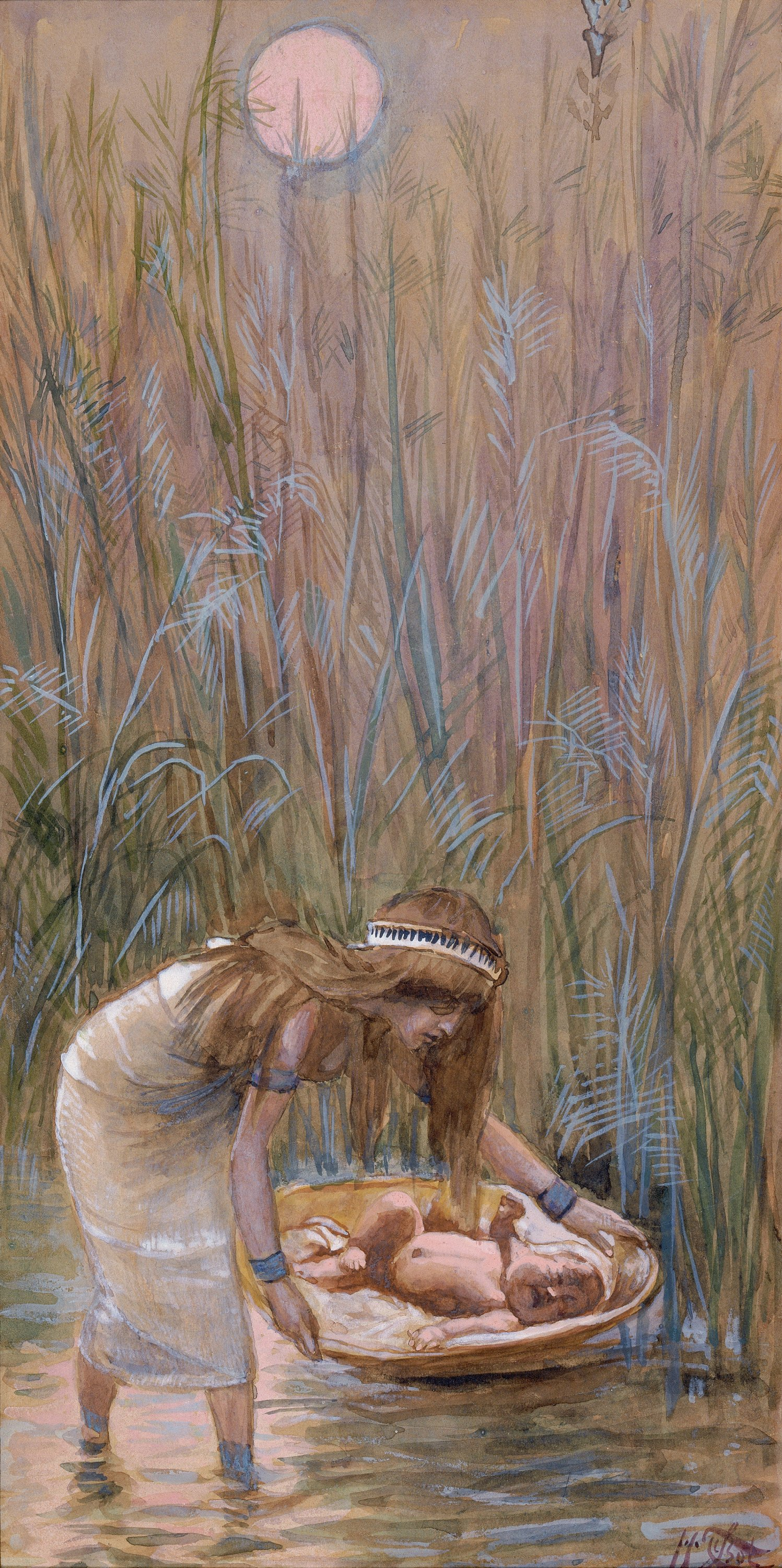
Moses Laid Amid the Flags (watercolor circa 1896–1902 by James Tissot)

Interpreting the words "and when she saw him that he was good" in Exodus 2:2, Rabbi Meir taught that his name was Tov, meaning "good." Rabbi Judah said that his name was Tobiah, meaning "God is good." Rabbi Nehemiah deduced from the word "good" that Jochebed foresaw that Moses could be a prophet. Others said that he was born needing no further improvement, and thus that he was born circumcised. And the Sages noted the parallel between Exodus 2:2, which says, "and when she saw him that he was good," and Genesis 1:4, which says, "And God saw the light that it was good," and deduced from the similar use of the word "good" that when Moses was born, the whole house filled with light.

The Gemara asked why it was (as reported in Exodus 2:3) that "she could no longer hide him." The Gemara explained that whenever the Egyptians were informed that a child was born, they would take other children into the neighborhood so that the newborn should hear the other children crying and cry along with them, thus disclosing the newborn's location.

Rabbi Eleazar explained that Jochebed's choice of bulrushes—a cheap material—for the ark (as reported in Exodus 2:3) demonstrated that righteous people's money is dearer to them than their bodies, so that they should not be driven to steal. Rabbi Samuel bar Naḥmani explained that she chose bulrushes for the ark because they provided a soft material that could withstand encounters with soft and hard materials alike.

A baraita taught that Jochebed "daubed it with slime and with pitch" (as reported in Exodus 2:3) with the slime on the inside and the pitch on outside so that the righteous baby Moses would not be subjected to the bad odor of the pitch.

Interpreting the words "she put the child therein and laid it in the reeds (suf)" in Exodus 2:3, Rabbi Eleazar read suf to mean the Red Sea (called the Yam Suf, יַם-סוּף). But Rabbi Samuel bar Naḥmani said that suf means "reeds," as it does in Isaiah 19:6, where it says, "the reeds and flags shall wither away."

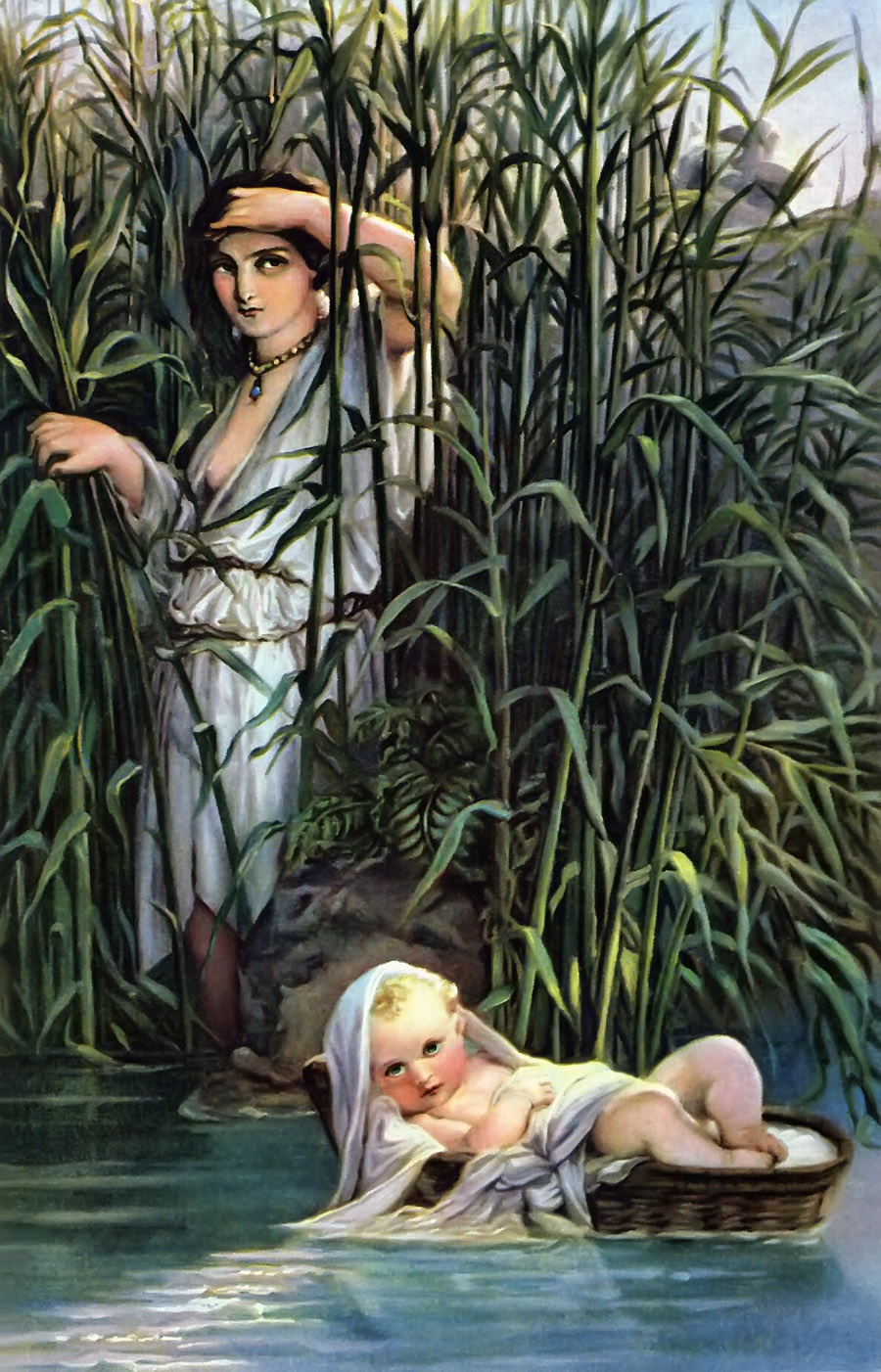
Moses in the Bulrushes (19th Century painting by Hippolyte Delaroche)

The Sages taught in a baraita in the Babylonian Talmud that seven prophetesses prophesied on behalf of the Jewish people. The Gemara identified them as Sarah, Miriam, Deborah, Hannah, Abigail, Huldah, and Esther. The Gemara explained that Miriam was a prophetess, as Exodus 15:20 says explicitly: "And Miriam the prophetess, the sister of Aaron, took a timbrel in her hand." The Gemara asked why this verse mentions only Aaron and not Moses. Rav Naḥman said that Rav said that she prophesied when she was only Aaron’s sister, before Moses was born, saying that her mother was destined to bear a son who would deliver the Jewish people to salvation. When Moses was born, the entire house was filled with light, and her father stood and kissed her on the head and told her that her prophecy had been fulfilled. But when Moses was cast into the river, her father patted her on the head, asking what had become of her prophecy, as it looked as though Moses would soon meet his end. That is why Exodus 2:4 reports: "And his sister stood at a distance to know what would be done to him," for Miriam wanted to know how her prophecy would be fulfilled.

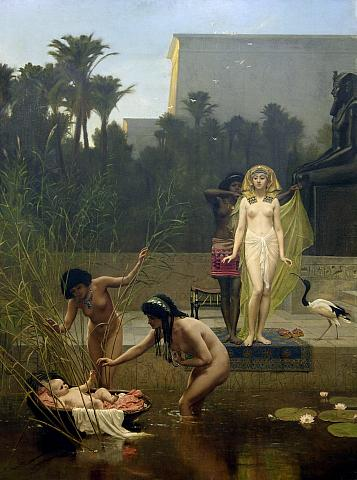
The Finding of Moses (1862 painting by Frederick Goodall)

The Mishnah cited Exodus 2:4 for the proposition that Providence treats a person measure for measure as that person treats others. And so because, as Exodus 2:4 relates, Miriam waited for the baby Moses, so the Israelites waited seven days for her in the wilderness in Numbers 12:15. The Tosefta taught that a reward for good deeds is 500 times greater than the punishment for retribution. Abaye thus said that in connection with good deeds, the principle of measure for measure does not apply strictly with equivalence. Rava replied that the Mishnah taught, "It is the same in connection with the good," so the Mishnah must mean that Providence rewards good deeds with the same sort of measure, but the measure of reward for good is greater than the measure of punishment.

Rabbi Isaac noted that Exodus 2:4 used several words associated elsewhere in Scripture with the Shechinah, and deduced that the Divine Presence thus stood with Miriam as she watched over the baby Moses.

Rabbi Joshua identified the Israelite who asked Moses in Exodus 2:14, "Who made you a ruler and a judge over us?" as Dathan, who later joined in Korah’s rebellion in Numbers 16:1.

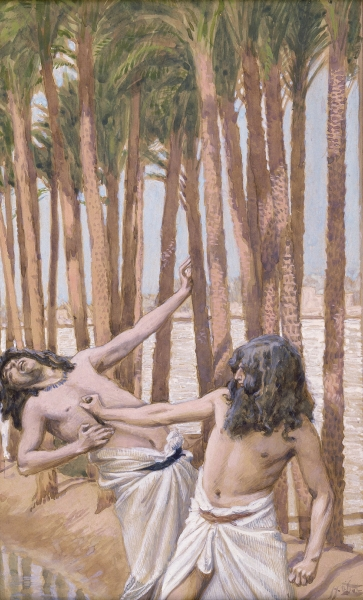
Moses Slays an Egyptian (watercolor circa 1896–1902 by James Tissot)

In the Jerusalem Talmud, Rabbi Judan said in the name of Rabbi Isaac that God saved Moses from Pharaoh's sword. Reading Exodus 2:15, Rabbi Yannai asked whether it was possible for a person of flesh and blood to escape from a government. Rather, Rabbi Yannai said that Pharaoh caught Moses and sentenced him to be beheaded. Just as the executioner brought down his sword, Moses' neck became like an ivory tower (as described in Song of Songs 7:5) and broke the sword. Rabbi Judah haNasi said in the name of Rabbi Evyasar that the sword flew off Moses' neck and killed the executioner. The Gemara cited Exodus 18:4 to support this deduction, reading the words "and delivered me" as superfluous unless they were necessary to show that God saved Moses but not the executioner. Rabbi Berechyah cited the executioner's fate as an application of the proposition of Proverbs 21:8 that a wicked ransoms a righteous one, and Rabbi Avun cited it for the same proposition applying Proverbs 11:18. In a second explanation of how Moses escaped, Bar Kappara taught a baraita that an angel came down from heaven in the likeness of Moses, they seized the angel, and Moses escaped. In a third explanation of how Moses escaped, Rabbi Joshua ben Levi said that when Moses fled from Pharaoh, God incapacitated Pharaoh's people by making some of them mute, some of them deaf, and some of them blind. When Pharaoh asked where Moses was, the mutes could not reply, the deaf could not hear, and the blind could not see. And it was this event to which God referred in Exodus 4:11 when God asked Moses who made men mute or deaf or blind.

Reading Exodus 2:23–25, the Jerusalem Talmud taught that God redeemed the Israelites from Egypt for five reasons: (1) because of the tribulation reported in Exodus 2:23, (2) because of the entreaty reported in Exodus 2:23, (3) because of the merit of the ancestors reported in Exodus 2:24, (4) because of repentance, as Exodus 2:25 says, " God looked upon the Israelites," and (5) because of the elapsing of the term predetermined in Genesis 15:13 for their rescue, as Exodus 2:25 says, "God took notice."

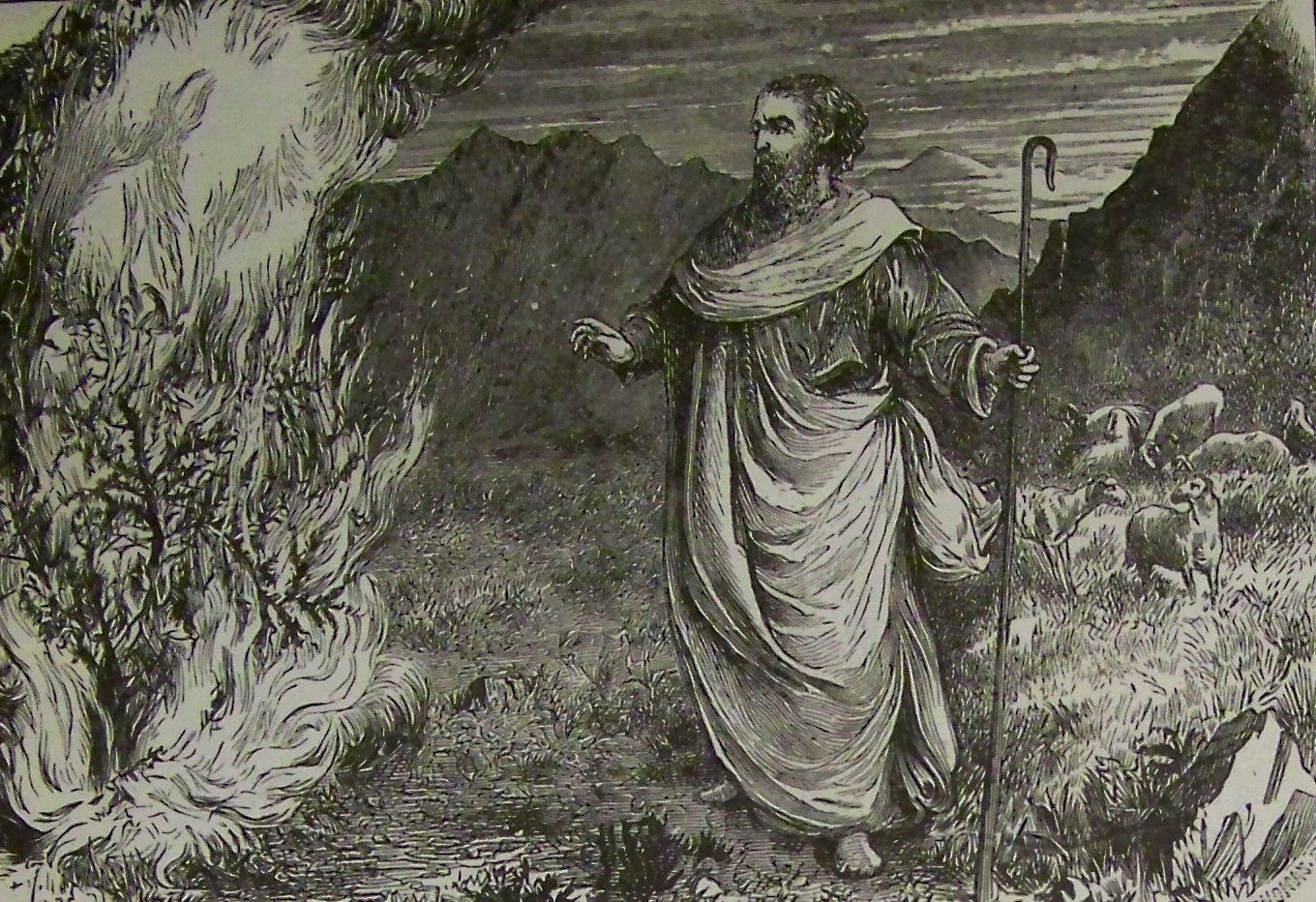
Moses and the Burning Bush (illustration from the 1890 Holman Bible)

=== Exodus chapter 3 ===
Interpreting Exodus 3:1, a midrash taught that God tested Moses through his experience as a shepherd. The Rabbis said that when Moses was tending Jethro's flock in the wilderness, a little kid escaped. Moses ran after the kid until it reached a shady place, where the kid stopped to drink at a pool of water. Moses reasoned that the kid had run away because it was thirsty and concluded that the kid must be weary. So Moses carried the kid back on his shoulder. Consequently God decided that because Moses had mercy leading that flock of sheep, Moses would assuredly tend God's flock Israel.

Interpreting the words in Exodus 3:1, "he led the flock to the farthest end of the wilderness," a midrash taught that Moses did so to keep them from despoiling the fields of others. God therefore took Moses to tend Israel.

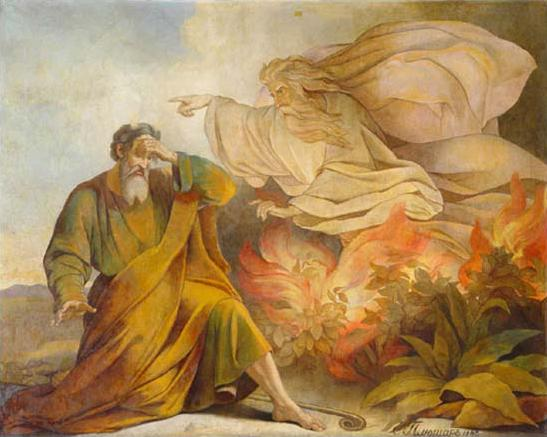
God Appears to Moses in Burning Bush (1848 painting by Eugène Pluchart from Saint Isaac's Cathedral, Saint Petersburg)

A midrash taught that when God first spoke to Moses (through the angel at the beginning of Exodus 3:2), Moses was at first unwilling to desist from his work. So God therefore showed Moses the burning bush, so that Moses might turn his face to see (such a striking phenomenon) and speak with God. Thus Exodus 3:2 says at first, "And the angel of the Lord appeared to him," and yet Moses did not go to see. But as soon as Moses stopped his work and went to see (in Exodus 3:4), God (and not merely the angel) immediately called to Moses.

Rabbi Yannai taught that just as if one twin has a pain, the other feels it also, so God said, (in Psalm 91:15), "I will be with him in trouble." Similarly, a midrash taught that as Isaiah 63:9 says, "In all their affliction He was afflicted." And thus, God asked Moses to realize that God lives in trouble just as the Israelites live in trouble, and that Moses could see from the place from which God spoke to Moses—from the thorn-bush—that God was a partner in their trouble.

Reading Exodus 3:2, "And the angel of the Lord appeared," Rabbi Joḥanan said that it was Michael, while Rabbi Hanina said that it was Gabriel.

A midrash taught that God spoke from the midst of a bush to teach that there is no place that is vacant of the Divine Presence—even a bush.

Rav Joseph taught that a person should always learn from the Creator; for God ignored all the mountains and heights and caused the Divine Presence (Shechinah) to abide upon Mount Sinai, and ignored all the beautiful trees and caused the Divine Presence (Shechinah) to abide in a bush (as reported in Exodus 3:2). (Similarly, people should practice humility.)

The Mekhilta of Rabbi Simeon taught that God spoke to Moses from the thorn bush because it is more formidable than other plants in that a bird that enters it cannot emerge from it without being cut. Similarly, the servitude in Egypt was harsher before God than other servitudes, for no slave had gone free from Egypt, except for Hagar, whom Genesis 12:20 indicates Pharaoh sent out of Egypt with Abraham.

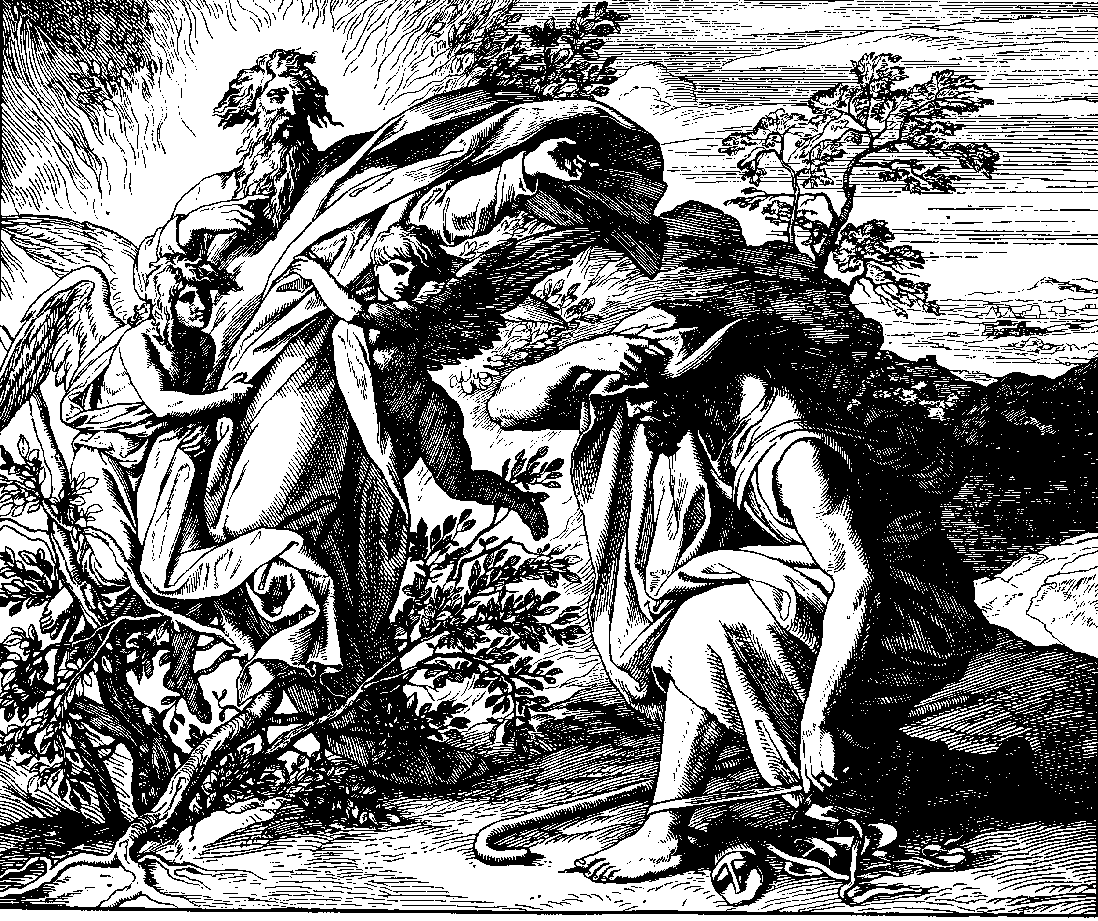
Moses Is Sent to Egypt (woodcut by Julius Schnorr von Carolsfeld from the 1860 Die Bibel in Bildern)

The Sifra cited Exodus 3:4 along with Leviticus 1:1 for the proposition that whenever God spoke to Moses, God first called out to him. And the Sifra cited Genesis 22:11, Genesis 46:2, Exodus 3:4, and 1 Samuel 3:10 for the proposition that when God called the name of a prophet twice, God expressed affection and sought to provoke a response.

Midrash Tanḥuma explained that before the Israelites erected the Tabernacle, God spoke to Moses from the burning bush, as Exodus 3:4 says, "God called to him out of the bush." After that, God spoke to Moses in Midian, as Exodus 4:19 says, "The Lord said to Moses in Midian." After that, God spoke to Moses in Egypt, as Exodus 12:1 says, "The Lord said to Moses and Aaron in the land of Egypt." After that, God spoke to Moses at Sinai, as Numbers 1:1 says, "The Lord spoke to Moses in the wilderness of Sinai." Once the Israelites erected the Tabernacle, God said, "modesty is beautiful," as Micah 6:8 says, "and to walk humbly with your God,” and God began talking with Moses in the Tent of Meeting.

Reading God's words to Moses in Exodus 3:6, "I am the God of your father," Rabbi Joshua Ha-Kohen bar Neḥemiah taught that when God first appeared to Moses, Moses was a novice at prophecy. God reasoned that if God would appear to Moses in loud voice, God would terrify him, but if God appeared in a soft voice, Moses would take prophecy lightly. So God appeared to Moses with the voice of his father. Moses replied, "Here I am; what does my father want?" God then said, "I am not your father, but the God of your father. I have come to you with inducements so you will not be afraid."

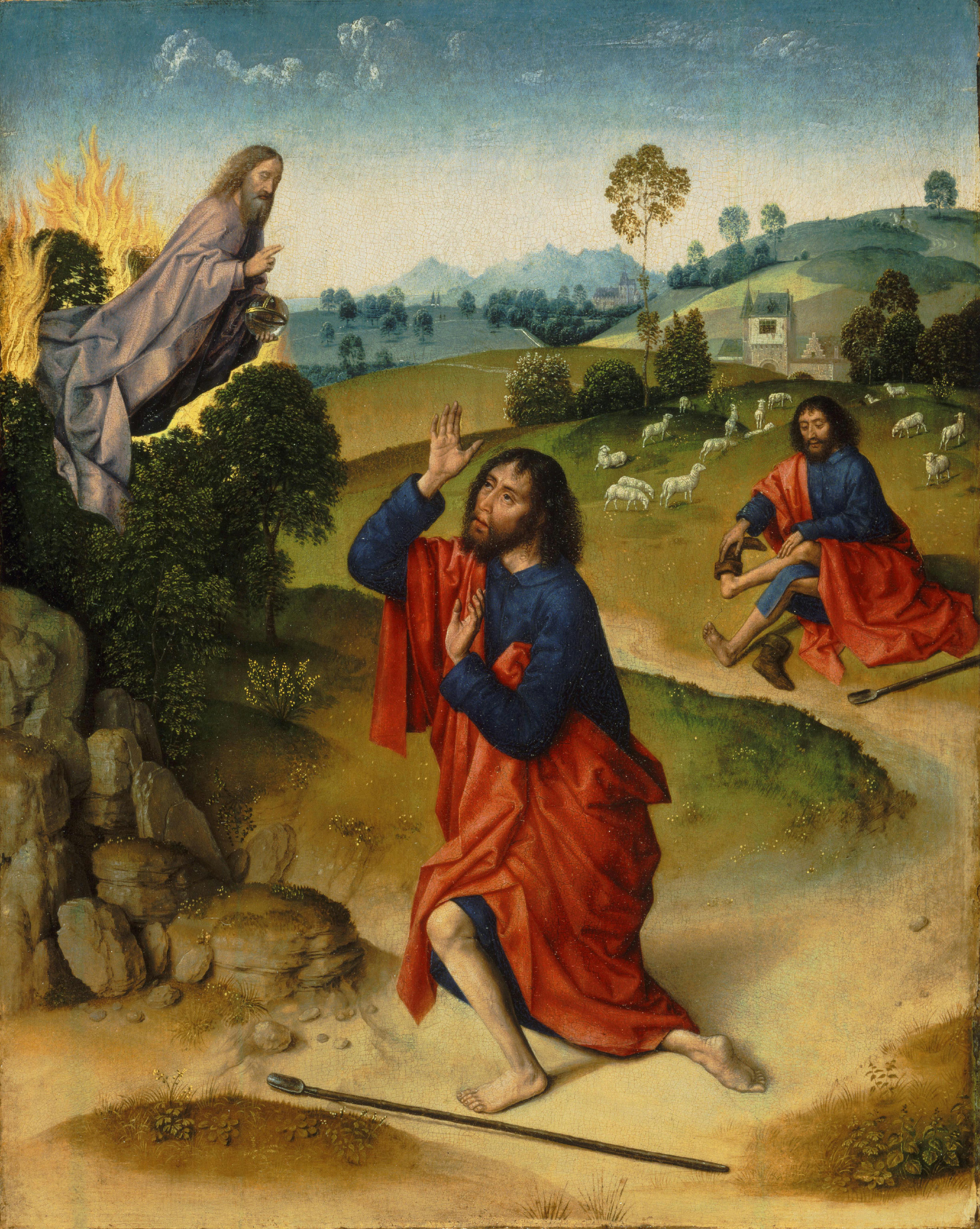
Moses and the Burning Bush (painting circa 1450–1475 attributed to Dirk Bouts)

A baraita taught that a person should not enter the Temple Mount either with a staff in hand or shoe on foot, or with money tied up in a cloth, or with a money bag slung over a shoulder, and should not take a short cut through the Temple Mount. The baraita taught that spitting on the Temple Mount is forbidden a fortiori from the case of wearing a shoe. While the wearing of a shoe does not show contempt, in Exodus 3:5, God instructed Moses, "Put off your shoes." The baraita deduced that the rule must apply even more to spitting, which does show contempt. But Rabbi Jose bar Judah said that this reasoning was unnecessary, for Esther 4:2 says, "none may enter within the king's gate clothed in sackcloth." And thus one may deduce a fortiori that if that is the rule for sackcloth, which is not in itself disgusting, and before an earthly king, how much more would that be the rule with spitting, which is in itself disgusting, and before the supreme King of Kings!

A baraita taught in the name of Rabbi Joshua ben Korhah that God told Moses that when God wanted to be seen at the burning bush, Moses did not want to see God's face; Moses hid his face in Exodus 3:6, for he was afraid to look upon God. And then in Exodus 33:18, when Moses wanted to see God, God did not want to be seen; in Exodus 33:20, God said, "You cannot see My face." But Rabbi Samuel bar Naḥmani said in the name of Rabbi Jonathan that in compensation for three pious acts that Moses did at the burning bush, he was privileged to obtain three rewards. In reward for hiding his face in Exodus 3:6, his face shone in Exodus 34:29. In reward for his fear of God in Exodus 3:6, the Israelites were afraid to come near him in Exodus 34:30. In reward for his reticence "to look upon God," he beheld the similitude of God in Numbers 12:8.

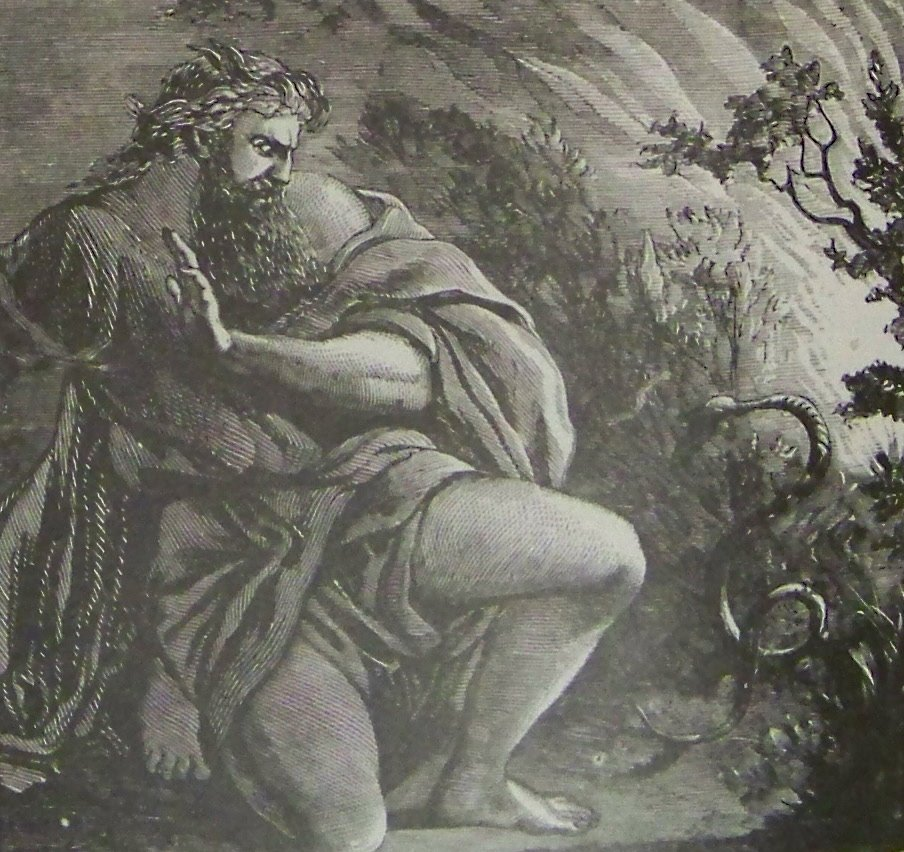
Moses' Rod Turned into a Serpent (illustration from the 1890 Holman Bible)

The Gemara reported a number of Rabbis' reports of how the Land of Israel did indeed flow with "milk and honey," as described in Exodus 3:8 and 17, 13:5, and 33:3, Leviticus 20:24, Numbers 13:27 and 14:8, and Deuteronomy 6:3, 11:9, 26:9 and 15, 27:3, and 31:20. Once when Rami bar Ezekiel visited Bnei Brak, he saw goats grazing under fig trees while honey was flowing from the figs, and milk dripped from the goats mingling with the fig honey, causing him to remark that it was indeed a land flowing with milk and honey. Rabbi Jacob ben Dostai said that it is about three miles from Lod to Ono, and once he rose up early in the morning and waded all that way up to his ankles in fig honey. Resh Lakish said that he saw the flow of the milk and honey of Sepphoris extend over an area of sixteen miles by sixteen miles. Rabbah bar Bar Hana said that he saw the flow of the milk and honey in all the Land of Israel and the total area was equal to an area of twenty-two parasangs by six parasangs.

Reading God's words in Exodus 3:14, "I will be that I will be," the Gemara taught that God told Moses to tell the Israelites that God was with them in this enslavement, would be with them in this redemption, and would be with them in the enslavement of the kingdoms in the future. Moses suggested to God that it might be enough for them to endure in the present and there was no need to mention their future enslavement. God agreed with Moses and told him to tell the Israelites only, "I Will Be has sent me to you."

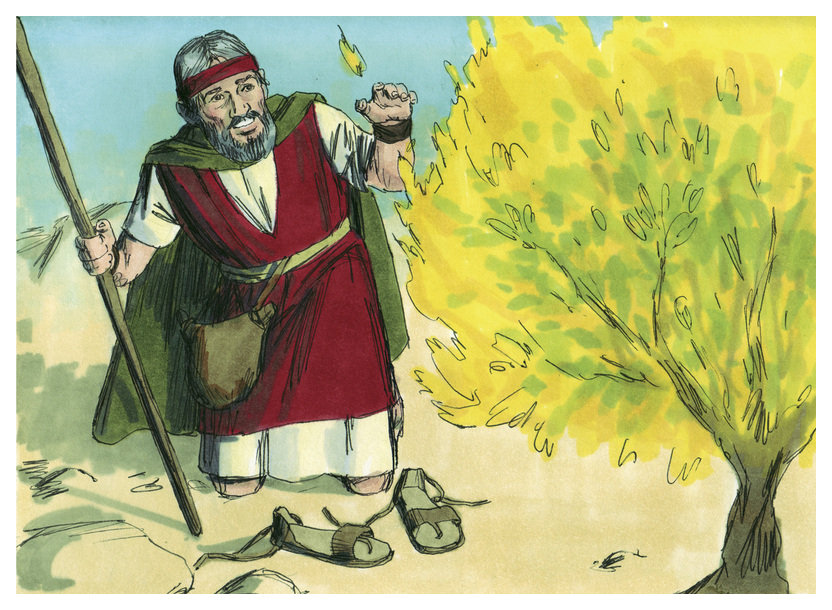
The Lord spoke to Moses from the midst of a burning bush. (1984 illustration by Jim Padgett, courtesy of Distant Shores Media/Sweet Publishing)

Expanding on Exodus 3:14, Rabbi Abba bar Memel taught that in response to the request of Moses to know God's Name, God told Moses that God is called according to God's work—sometimes Scripture calls God "Almighty God," "Lord of Hosts," "God," or "Lord." When God judges created beings, Scripture calls God "God," and when God wages war against the wicked, Scripture calls God "Lord of Hosts" (as in 1 Samuel 15:2 and Isaiah 12:14–15). When God suspends judgment for a person's sins, Scripture calls God "El Shadday" ("Almighty God"), and when God is merciful towards the world, Scripture calls God "Adonai" ("Lord"), for "Adonai" refers to the Attribute of Mercy, as Exodus 34:6 says: "The Lord, the Lord (Adonai, Adonai), God, merciful and gracious." Hence in Exodus 3:14, God said "'I Am That I Am' in virtue of My deeds." Rabbi Isaac taught that God told Moses to tell them that "I am now what I always was and always will be," and for this reason God said the word eheyeh (denoting "I will be" or the eternal "I am") three times. Rabbi Jacob bar Avina in the name of Rabbi Huna of Sepphoris interpreted "I Am That I Am" to mean that God told Moses to tell them that God would be with them in this servitude, and in servitude they would always continue, but God would be with them. Moses asked God whether he should tell them this, asking whether the evil of the hour was not sufficient. God replied in the words of Exodus 3:14, "No, 'Thus shall you say to the children of Israel: "I Am has sent me to you."' To you only do I reveal this (the future periods of servitude) but not to them." Rabbi Isaac in the name of Rabbi Ammi interpreted "I Am" to mean that the Israelites were standing amid clay and bricks and would go on to clay and bricks (from servitude to servitude). Moses asked God whether he should tell them this, and God replied "No, but 'I Am has sent me to you.'" Rabbi Joḥanan taught that God said, "'I am that I am' to individuals, but as for the mass, I rule over them even against their desire and will, even though they break their teeth, as it is said (in Ezekiel 20:33) '"As I live," says the Lord God, "surely with a mighty hand and with an outstretched arm, and with fury poured out, will I be King over you."'" Rabbi Ananiel bar Rabbi Sasson taught that God said, "When I so wish it, one of the angels who is a third of the world stretches out his hand from heaven and touches the earth, as it says (in Ezekiel 8:3): 'And the form of a hand was put forth, and I was taken by a lock of my head.' And when I desire it, I make those of them sit beneath a tree, as it is said (in Genesis 18:4): 'And recline yourselves under the tree'; and when I desire, His glory fills the whole world, as it is said (in Jeremiah 23:24), 'Do not I fill heaven and earth? says the Lord.' And when I wished, I spoke with Job from the whirlwind, as it is said (in Job 40:6), 'Then the Lord answered Job out of the whirlwind,' and when I wish, I speak from a thorn-bush (contracting or expanding at will)."

A midrash taught that God has 70 Names, one of which is Ehyeh Asher Ehyeh, which signifies that God is the Only One and there is none beside God.

A baraita taught that the names of God, including "I Shall Be As I Shall Be," may not be erased.

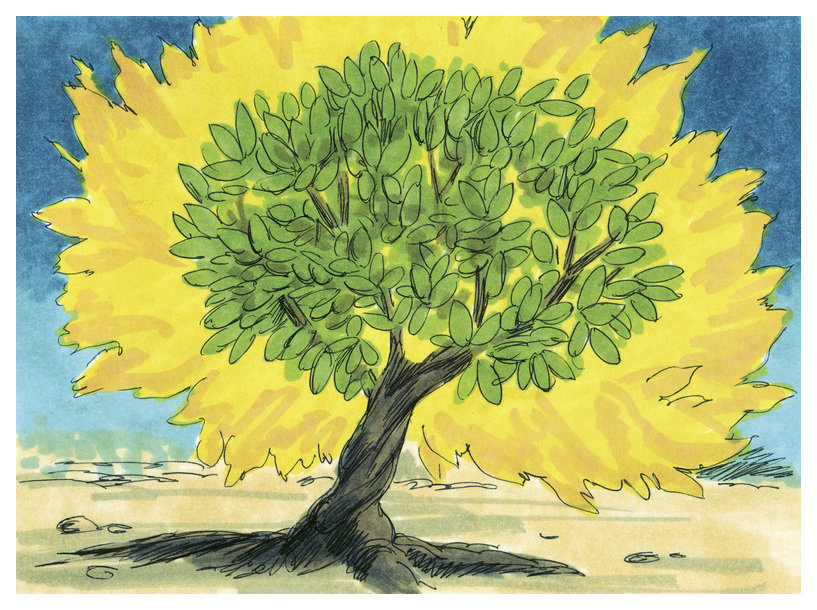
The Burning Bush (1984 illustration by Jim Padgett, courtesy of Distant Shores Media/Sweet Publishing)

A certain old man told Rava that one can read Exodus 3:15 to say, "This is My Name, to be hidden." Rabbi Avina pointed out a contradiction between, "This is My Name, to be hidden," and the next clause of Exodus 3:15, "and this is My memorial to all generations." Rabbi Avina taught that God said that God's Name is not pronounced as The Name is written: The Name is written יהוה, YHWH, and read אֲדֹנָי, Adonai. Reading Zechariah 14:9, "And the Lord shall be King over all the earth; in that day shall the Lord be One, and His name one," Rav Naḥman bar Isaac taught that the future world will not be like this world. In this world God's Name is written יהוה, YHWH, and read אֲדֹנָי, Adonai, but in the future world God's Name shall all be one: It shall be written יהוה, YHWH, and read יהוה, YHWH.

Reading Exodus 3:15, a midrash taught that God told Moses to speak to the Israelites in God's Name (the Tetragrammaton), which is the attribute of justice, with which God conducts God's Self with the Israelites due to the merit of their ancestors.

The Mekhilta of Rabbi Ishmael taught that it is because of Exodus 3:15 that one says (in the Amidah prayer), "Blessed are You, O Lord our God, and the God of our fathers, the God of Abraham, the God of Isaac, and the God of Jacob."

The Tosefta equated God's visitation with God's remembrance in verses such as Exodus 3:16.

Rabbi Ḥama bar Ḥanina taught that our ancestors were never without a scholars' council. Abraham was an elder and a member of the scholars' council, as Genesis 24:1 says, "And Abraham was an elder well stricken in age." Eliezer, Abraham's servant, was an elder and a member of the scholars' council, as Genesis 24:2 says, "And Abraham said to his servant, the elder of his house, who ruled over all he had," which Rabbi Eleazar explained to mean that he ruled over—and thus knew and had control of—the Torah of his master. Isaac was an elder and a member of the scholars' council, as Genesis 27:1 says: "And it came to pass when Isaac was an elder." Jacob was an elder and a member of the scholars' council, as Genesis 48:10 says, "Now the eyes of Israel were dim with age." In Egypt they had the scholars' council, as Exodus 3:16 says, "Go and gather the elders of Israel together." And in the Wilderness, they had the scholars' council, as in Numbers 11:16, God directed Moses to "Gather . . . 70 men of the elders of Israel."

A midrash noted that in saying in Exodus 3:16, "I have most assuredly taken note (פָּקֹ֤ד פָּקַ֙דְתִּי֙, pakod pakadeti)," God echoed Joseph's prophecy in Genesis 50:24, "God will surely take notice of you (פָּקֹ֧ד יִפְקֹ֣ד, pakod yifkod)." The midrash taught that God told Moses that the elders had a tradition from Joseph that God would deliver them with this expression, so Moses should go and use that expression as the sign of God's imminent deliverance.

Similarly, Rabbi Eliezer taught that the five Hebrew letters of the Torah that alone among Hebrew letters have two separate shapes (depending whether they are in the middle or the end of a word)—צ פ נ מ כ (Kh, M, N, P, Z)—all relate to the mystery of the redemption. With the letter kaph (כ), God redeemed Abraham from Ur of the Chaldees, as in Genesis 12:1, God says, "Get you (לֶךְ-לְךָ, lekh lekha) out of your country, and from your kindred . . . to the land that I will show you." With the letter mem (מ), Isaac was redeemed from the land of the Philistines, as in Genesis 26:16, the Philistine king Abimelech told Isaac, "Go from us: for you are much mightier (מִמֶּנּוּ, מְאֹד, mimenu m'od) than we." With the letter nun (נ), Jacob was redeemed from the hand of Esau, as in Genesis 32:12, Jacob prayed, "Deliver me, I pray (הַצִּילֵנִי נָא, hazileini na), from the hand of my brother, from the hand of Esau." With the letter pe (פ), God redeemed Israel from Egypt, as in Exodus 3:16–17, God told Moses, "I have surely visited you, (פָּקֹד פָּקַדְתִּי, pakod pakadeti) and (seen) that which is done to you in Egypt, and I have said, I will bring you up out of the affliction of Egypt." With the letter tsade (צ), God will redeem Israel from the oppression of the kingdoms, and God will say to Israel, I have caused a branch to spring forth for you, as Zechariah 6:12 says, "Behold, the man whose name is the Branch (צֶמַח, zemach); and he shall grow up (יִצְמָח, yizmach) out of his place, and he shall build the temple of the Lord." These letters were delivered to Abraham. Abraham delivered them to Isaac, Isaac delivered them to Jacob, Jacob delivered the mystery of the Redemption to Joseph, and Joseph delivered the secret of the Redemption to his brothers, as in Genesis 50:24, Joseph told his brothers, "God will surely visit (פָּקֹד יִפְקֹד, pakod yifkod) you." Jacob's son Asher delivered the mystery of the Redemption to his daughter Serah. When Moses and Aaron came to the elders of Israel and performed signs in their sight, the elders told Serah. She told them that there is no reality in signs. The elders told her that Moses said, "God will surely visit (פָּקֹד יִפְקֹד, pakod yifkod) you" (as in Genesis 50:24). Serah told the elders that Moses was the one who would redeem Israel from Egypt, for she heard (in the words of Exodus 3:16), "I have surely visited (פָּקֹד פָּקַדְתִּי, pakod pakadeti) you." The people immediately believed in God and Moses, as Exodus 4:31 says, "And the people believed, and when they heard that the Lord had visited the children of Israel."

Reading God's warning to Moses in Exodus 3:19, "I know that the king of Egypt will not let you go," a midrash taught that God saw what Pharaoh was destined to do and that he would increase the people's workload as soon as Moses went to Pharaoh. So God made known this known to Moses so that he would not reproach Heaven. Nevertheless, he did reproached Heaven, and the words of Ecclesiastes 7:7 apply to Moses, "For oppression turns a wise person into a fool."

=== Exodus chapter 4 ===
Resh Lakish taught that Providence punishes bodily those who unjustifiably suspect the innocent. In Exodus 4:1, Moses said that the Israelites "will not believe me," but God knew that the Israelites would believe. God thus told Moses that the Israelites were believers and descendants of believers, while Moses would ultimately disbelieve. The Gemara explained that Exodus 4:13 reports that "the people believed" and Genesis 15:6 reports that the Israelites' ancestor Abraham "believed in the Lord," while Numbers 20:12 reports that Moses "did not believe." Thus, Moses was smitten when in Exodus 4:6 God turned his hand white as snow.

The Mishnah counted the miraculous rod of Exodus 4:2–5,17 among ten things that God created at twilight at the end of the sixth day of creation.

A midrash read Moses' words to God in Exodus 4:10, "I am not a man of words, neither yesterday, nor the day before, nor since You spoke," to indicate that God had been coaxing Moses to go on the mission to Egypt for seven days, but Moses resisted until the incident at the Burning Bush. The midrash read "I am not a man of words" to indicate day one, "yesterday" to indicate day two, "neither (גַּ֛ם, gam)" to indicate day three, "the day before" to indicate day four, "nor (גַּ֛ם, gam)" to indicate day five, "since" to indicate day six, and "You spoke" to indicate day seven.

Rabbi Samuel bar Naḥman taught that Moses first incurred his fate to die in the wilderness because of his conduct at the Burning Bush, for there God tried for seven days to persuade Moses to go on the mission to Egypt. And in the end, Moses told God in Exodus 4:13, "Send, I pray, by the hand of him whom You will send." God replied that God would keep this in store for Moses. Rabbi Berekiah in Rabbi Levi's name and Rabbi Helbo give different answers on when God repaid Moses. One said that all the seven days of the consecration of the priesthood in Leviticus 8, Moses functioned as High Priest, and he came to think that the office belonged to him. But in the end, God told Moses that the job was not his, but his brother's, as Leviticus 9:1 says, “And it came to pass on the eighth day, that Moses called Aaron.” The other taught that all the first seven days of Adar of the fortieth year, Moses beseeched God to enter the Promised Land, but in the end, God told him in Deuteronomy 3:27, “You shall not go over this Jordan.”

Rabbi Simeon ben Yochai taught that because Aaron was, in the words of Exodus 4:14, “glad in his heart” over the success of Moses, in the words of Exodus 28:30, “the breastplate of judgment the Urim and the Thummim . . . shall be upon Aaron's heart.”

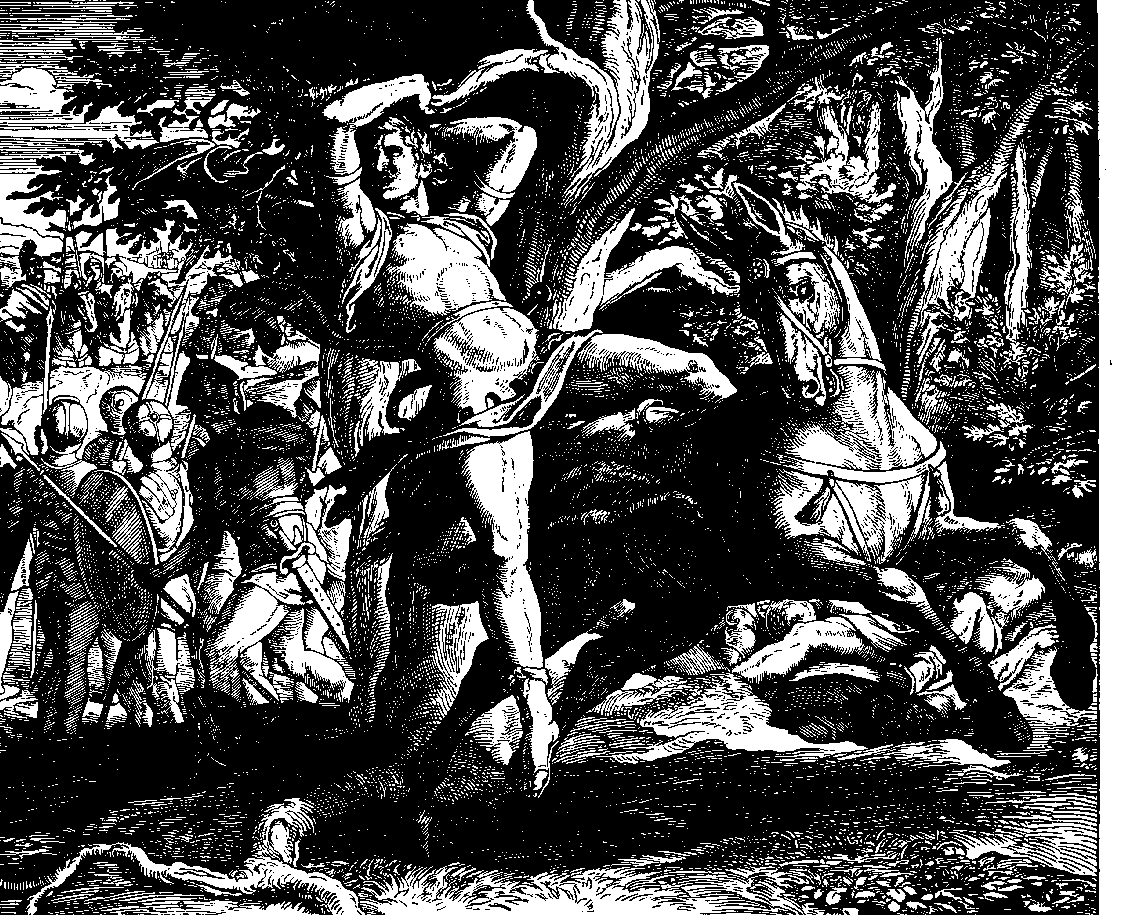
Absalom's Death (woodcut by Julius Schnorr von Carolsfeld from the 1860 Die Bibel in Bildern)

A midrash explained why Moses returned to Jethro in Exodus 4:18. The midrash taught that when Moses first came to Jethro, he swore that he would not depart without Jethro's knowledge. Thus when God commissioned Moses to return to Egypt, Moses first went to ask Jethro to absolve him of his oath.

Rabbi Levi bar Hitha taught that one bidding farewell to a living friend should not say, "Go in peace (לֵךְ בְּשָׁלוֹם, lech b'shalom)" but "Go unto peace (לֵךְ לְשָׁלוֹם, lech l'shalom)." The Gemara cited Jethro's farewell to Moses in Exodus 4:18 as a proof of the proper farewell, for there Jethro said, "Go unto peace," and Moses went on to succeed in his mission. The Gemara cited David's farewell to Absalom in 2 Samuel 15:9 as a proof of an improper farewell, for there David said, "Go in peace," and Absalom went and got caught up in a tree and became easy prey for his adversaries, who killed him.

Rabbi Joḥanan said on the authority of Rabbi Simeon ben Yoḥai that wherever the Torah mentions "quarrelling" (nizzim), the Torah refers to Dathan and Abiram. Thus, the Gemara identified as Dathan and Abiram the men whom Exodus 4:19 reports sought the life of Moses. Resh Lakish further explained that they had not actually died, as Exodus 4:19 appears to report, but had become impoverished, for (as a baraita taught) the impoverished are considered as if they were dead (for they have similarly little influence in the world). The baraita taught that four types of people are accounted as though they were dead: a poor person, a person affected by skin disease (a metzora), a blind person, and one who is childless. A poor person is accounted as dead, for Exodus 4:19 says, "for all the men are dead who sought your life" (and the Gemara interpreted this to mean that they had been stricken with poverty). A person affected by skin disease (מְּצֹרָע, metzora) is accounted as dead, for Numbers 12:10–12 says, "And Aaron looked upon Miriam, and behold, she was leprous (מְצֹרָעַת, metzora'at). And Aaron said to Moses . . . let her not he as one dead." The blind are accounted as dead, for Lamentations 3:6 says, "He has set me in dark places, as they that be dead of old." And one who is childless is accounted as dead, for in Genesis 30:1, Rachel said, "Give me children, or else I am dead."

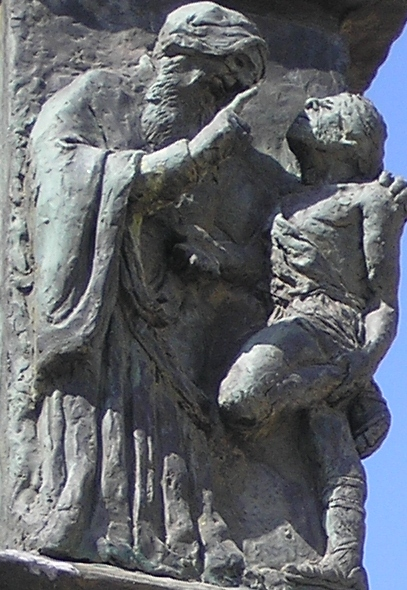
Hillel (sculpture at the Knesset Menorah, Jerusalem)

A baraita cited the Septuagint's Greek translation of Exodus 4:20 as one of several instances where translators varied the original. Where the Hebrew of Exodus 4:20 says, "And Moses took his wife and his sons, and set them upon a donkey," the baraita reported that the Greek translation said, "And Moses took his wife and his children, and made them ride on a carrier of men," so as to preserve the dignity of Moses.

A non-Jew asked Shammai to convert him to Judaism on condition that Shammai appoint him High Priest. Shammai pushed him away with a builder's ruler. The non-Jew then went to Hillel, who converted him. The convert then read Torah, and when he came to the injunction of Numbers 1:51, 3:10, and 18:7 that "the common man who draws near shall be put to death," he asked Hillel to whom the injunction applied. Hillel answered that it applied even to David, King of Israel, who had not been a priest. Thereupon the convert reasoned a fortiori that if the injunction applied to all (non-priestly) Israelites, whom in Exodus 4:22 God had called "my firstborn," how much more so would the injunction apply to a mere convert, who came among the Israelites with just his staff and bag. Then the convert returned to Shammai, quoted the injunction, and remarked on how absurd it had been for him to ask Shammai to appoint him High Priest.

A baraita taught that Rabbi Joshua ben Karha said that great is circumcision, for all the meritorious deeds performed by Moses did not protect him when he delayed circumcising his son Eliezer, and that failure brought about what Exodus 4:24 reports: "and the Lord met him and sought to kill him." Rabbi Jose, however, taught that Moses was not apathetic towards circumcision, but reasoned that if he circumcised his son and then immediately left on his mission to Pharaoh, he would endanger his son's life. Moses wondered whether he should circumcise his son and wait three days, but God had commanded him (in Exodus 4:19) to "return into Egypt." According to Rabbi Jose, God sought to punish Moses because Moses busied himself first with securing lodging at an inn (rather than seeing to the circumcision), as Exodus 4:24 reports, "And it came to pass on the way at the lodging-place." Rabban Simeon ben Gamaliel taught that the Accuser did not seek to slay Moses but Eliezer, for Exodus 4:25 reports, "Then Zipporah took a flint, and cut off the foreskin of her son, and cast it at his feet; and she said: ‘Surely a bridegroom of blood are you to me.'" Rabban Simeon ben Gamaliel reasoned that the one who could be called "a bridegroom of blood" was the infant who had been circumcised. Rabbi Judah bar Bizna taught that when Moses delayed circumcising Eliezer, two angels named Af (אַף, Anger) and Ḥemah (חֵמָה, Wrath) came and swallowed Moses up, leaving nothing but his legs unconsumed. Zipporah deduced from the angels' leaving the lower part of Moses exposed that the danger stemmed from failing to circumcise Eliezer, and (in the words of Exodus 4:25) she "took a sharp stone and cut off the foreskin of her son," and right away Af and Ḥemah let Moses go. At that moment, Moses wanted to kill Af and Ḥemah, as Psalm 37:8 says, "Cease from anger (אַף, Af) and forsake wrath (חֵמָה, Ḥemah)." Some say that Moses did kill Ḥemah, as Isaiah 27:4 says, "I have not wrath (חֵמָה, Ḥemah)." But Deuteronomy 9:19 says, "I was afraid of anger (אַף, Af) and wrath (חֵמָה, Ḥemah)," so the two must have been alive at that later time. The Gemara posited that there might have been two angels named Ḥemah. Alternatively, the Gemara suggested that Moses may have killed one of Ḥemah's legions.

A baraita taught that the Serah the daughter of Asher mentioned in Genesis 46:17 and Numbers 26:46 survived from the time Israel went down to Egypt to the time of the wandering in the Wilderness. The Gemara taught that Moses went to her to ask where the Egyptians had buried Joseph. She told him that the Egyptians had made a metal coffin for Joseph. The Egyptians set the coffin in the Nile so that its waters would be blessed. Moses went to the bank of the Nile and called to Joseph that the time had arrived for God to deliver the Israelites, and the oath that Joseph had imposed upon the children of Israel in Genesis 50:25 had reached its time of fulfillment. Moses called on Joseph to show himself, and Joseph's coffin immediately rose to the surface of the water. Similarly, a midrash taught that Serah conveyed to the Israelites a secret password handed down from Jacob so that they would recognize their deliverer. The midrash told that when, as Exodus 4:30 reports, “Aaron spoke all the words” to the Israelite people, “And the people believed,” as Exodus 4:31 reports, they did not believe only because they had seen the signs. Rather, as Exodus 4:31 reports, “They heard that the Lord had visited”—they believed because they heard, not because they saw the signs. What made them believe was the sign of God's visitation that God communicated to them through a tradition from Jacob, which Jacob handed down to Joseph, Joseph to his brothers, and Asher, the son of Jacob, handed down to his daughter Serah, who was still alive at the time of Moses and Aaron. Asher told Serah that any redeemer who would come and say the password to the Israelites would be their true deliverer. So when Moses came and said the password, the people believed him at once.

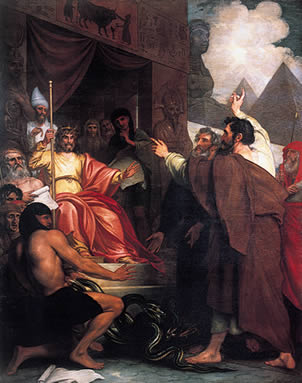
Moses and Aaron before Pharaoh (painting by Benjamin West)

=== Exodus chapter 5 ===
While the House of Shammai argued that the requirement for the appearance offering was greater than that for the festival offering, the House of Hillel cited Exodus 5:1 to show that the festival offering applied both before and after the revelation at Mount Sinai, and thus its requirement was greater than that for the appearance offering.

A midrash interpreted the words of Proverbs 29:23, "A man's pride shall bring him low; but he that is of a lowly spirit shall attain to honor," to apply to Pharaoh and Moses, respectively. The midrash taught that the words, "A man's pride shall bring him low," apply to Pharaoh, who in Exodus 5:2 haughtily asked, "Who is the Lord that I should hearken to His voice?" and so, as Psalm 136:15 reports, God "overthrew Pharaoh and his host." And the midrash taught that the words, "but he that is of a lowly spirit shall attain to honor," apply to Moses, who in Exodus 8:5, humbly asked Pharaoh, "Have this glory over me; at what time shall I entreat for you . . . that the frogs be destroyed," and was rewarded in Exodus 9:29 with the opportunity to say, "As soon as I am gone out of the city, I will spread forth my hands to the Lord [and] the thunders shall cease, neither shall there be any more hail."

The Pharisees noted that while in Exodus 5:2 Pharaoh asked who God was, once God had smitten him, in Exodus 9:27 Pharaoh acknowledged that God was righteous. Citing this juxtaposition, the Pharisees complained against heretics who placed the name of earthly rulers above the name of God.

Rabbi Nechunia, son of Hakkanah, cited Pharaoh as an example of the power of repentance. Pharaoh rebelled most grievously against God, saying, as reported in Exodus 5:2, "Who is the Lord, that I should hearken to His voice?" But then Pharaoh repented using the same terms of speech with which he sinned, saying the words of Exodus 15:11, "Who is like You, O Lord, among the mighty?" God thus delivered Pharaoh from the dead. Rabbi Nechunia deduced that Pharaoh had died from Exodus 9:15, in which God told Moses to tell Pharaoh, "For now I had put forth my hand, and smitten you."

== In medieval Jewish interpretation ==
The parashah is discussed in these medieval Jewish sources:

=== Exodus chapter 2 ===
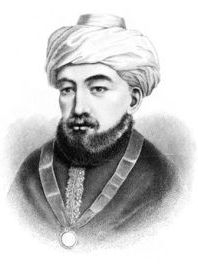
Maimonides

Maimonides read Exodus 18:21, “men of power,” to imply that judges should have a courageous heart to save the oppressed from the oppressor, as Exodus 2:17 reports, “And Moses arose and delivered them.”

=== Exodus chapter 3 ===
Reading God's self-identification to Moses in Exodus 3:15, "The Lord, the God of your fathers, the God of Abraham, the God of Isaac, and the God of Jacob, has sent me to you: This shall be My name forever," Baḥya ibn Paquda explained that God used this description because people cannot understand anything about God except for God's Name and that God exists. Thus, God identified God's self to the Israelites through the way that they gained knowledge of God—the traditions of their ancestors from whom they inherited it, as Genesis 18:19 states, "For I (God) have known him (Abraham), to the end that he may command his children and his household after him, that they may keep the way of the Lord, to do righteousness and justice." Baḥya suggested that it might also be possible that God revealed God's self to them through their ancestors because their ancestors alone in their generations served God when all around them worshipped other "gods" (like idols, the sun, the moon, or money). Baḥya taught that this also explains God's being called "the God of the Hebrews" in Exodus 3:18. Thus, Baḥya concluded that God's intent in Exodus 3:15 was that if the people could not understand God's words and their implications through intellectual reason, then Moses should tell them that God was known to them through the tradition that they received from their ancestors. For God did not establish any other way to know God except through (1) that which intellectual reason testifies through the evidence of God's deeds that are manifest in God's creations and (2) that of ancestral tradition.

=== Exodus chapter 4 ===
Reading God's statement in Exodus 4:21 that "I will harden his heart" and similar statements in Exodus 7:3; 9:12; 10:1, 20, 27; 11:10; and 14:4, 8, and 17, Maimonides concluded that it is possible for a person to commit such a great sin, or so many sins, that God decrees that the punishment for these willing and knowing acts is the removal of the privilege of repentance (teshuvah). The offender would thus be prevented from doing repentance and would not have the power to return from the offense, and the offender would die and be lost because of the offense. Maimonides read this to be what God said in Isaiah 6:10, "Make the heart of this people fat, and make their ears heavy, and their eyes weak, lest they see with their eyes and hear with their ears, and their hearts will understand, do repentance and be healed." Similarly, 2 Chronicles 36:16 reports, "They ridiculed the messengers of God, disdained His words and insulted His prophets until the anger of God rose upon the people, without possibility of healing." Maimonides interpreted these verses to teach that they sinned willingly and to such an egregious extent that they deserved to have repentance withheld from them. And thus, because Pharaoh sinned on his own at the beginning, harming the Jews who lived in his land, as Exodus 1:10 reports him scheming, "Let us deal craftily with them," God issued the judgment that repentance would be withheld from Pharaoh until he received his punishment, and therefore God said in Exodus 14:4, "I will harden the heart of Pharaoh." Maimonides explained that God sent Moses to tell Pharaoh to send out the Jews and do repentance, when God had already told Moses that Pharaoh would refuse, because God sought to inform humanity that when God withholds repentance from a sinner, the sinner will not be able to repent. Maimonides made clear that God did not decree that Pharaoh harm the Jewish people; rather, Pharaoh sinned willfully on his own, and he thus deserved to have the privilege of repentance withheld from him.

== In modern interpretation ==
The parashah is discussed in these modern sources:

=== Exodus chapter 1 ===
Noting that Exodus 1:11 does not identify the Pharaoh involved, Nahum Sarna wrote that the term “Pharaoh” in ancient Egyptian meant simply “The Great House.” The term originally applied to the royal palace and court, but late in the 18th Dynasty, Egyptians came to employ it by metonymy for the reigning monarch, just as English speakers would use “The White House” or “City Hall” today. Walter Brueggemann noted that while Exodus 1:11 does not name the Pharaoh, Exodus 1:15 does name the defiant midwives Shiphrah and Puah.

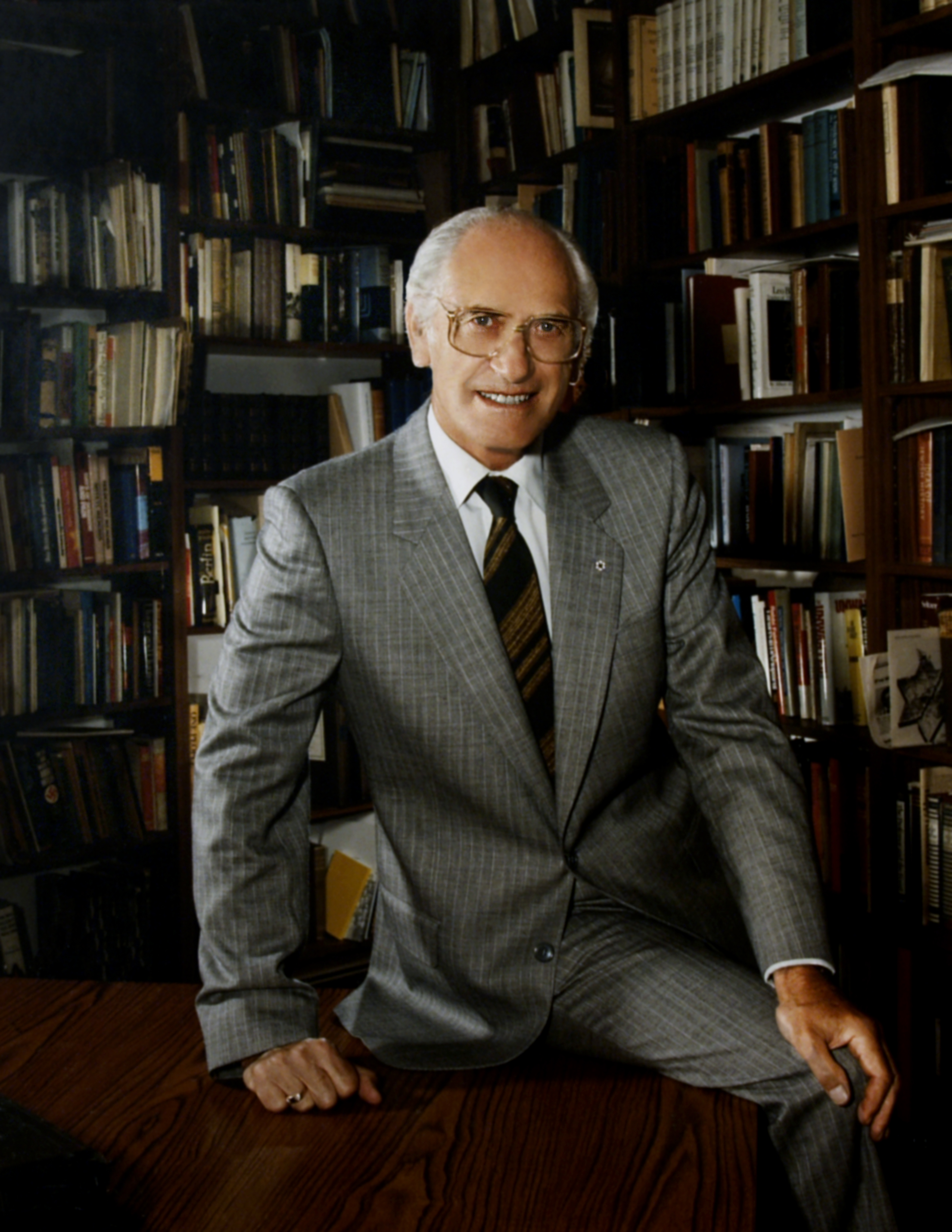
Plaut

Reading “Hebrew (עִבְרִיֹּת, Ivrit) midwives” in Exodus 1:15, Gunther Plaut noted that their names were northwest Semitic, suggesting that they were Hebrews. Plaut reported that scholars generally agree that the term “Hebrew” (עִברִי, Ivri) came from the name of a group called Habiru or Apiru, people who had lost their status in the community from which they came, and who were not necessarily related except by common fate. Plaut wrote that the Habiru were a class of people who lived in the Fertile Crescent during the 19th to 14th centuries B.C.E. who may originally have come from Arabia, became prominent in Mesopotamia, and later spread to Egypt. The Habiru followed distinct occupations, particularly mercenaries and administrators. Although at first they were nomads or seminomads, they later settled, but were usually considered foreigners and maintaining their group identity. The term Habiru referred not so much to an ethnic or linguistic group as to a social or political group. Plaut reported that the words Habiru and “Hebrew” (עִברִי, Ivri) appear to share a common linguistic root. Plaut concluded that Israelites in Egypt likely occupied positions similar to, or because of familial ties were identified with, the Habiru. When non-Israelites repeatedly applied the term to the Israelites, the Israelites themselves began to use the name Habiru, which they pronounced Ivri. Plaut considered it possible that for some time the term Ivri was used only when the Israelites spoke of themselves to outsiders and when outsiders referred to them. Thus Genesis 14:13 calls Abram Ivri vis-a-vis an outsider, and Jonah says, "I am an Ivri,” when asked his identity by non-Israelite sailors in Jonah 1:9, but otherwise Israelites referred to themselves by their tribes (for example, Judah or Ephraim) or by their common ancestor, Israel.

Sarna suggested that the biblical narrator might have construed the affliction of the Nile’s waters and the plague of frogs as a kind of retribution for the pharaoh’s decrees ordering the killing of male Israelites at birth in Genesis 1:16 and their drowning in the Nile in Genesis 1:22.

=== Exodus chapter 2 ===
Sigmund Freud saw in the story of Moses in the bulrushes in Exodus 2:1–10 echoes of a myth of a hero who stands up manfully against his father and in the end overcomes him. The myth traces this struggle back to the dawn of the hero's life, by having him born against his father's will and saved despite his father's evil intentions. Freud wrote that the exposure in the basket symbolized birth, with the basket as the womb and the stream as the water at birth. Freud wrote that dreams often represent the relation of the child to the parents by drawing or saving from water. A people would attach this myth to a famous person to recognize him as a hero whose life had conformed to the typical plan. Freud explained that the inner source of the myth was the "family romance" of the child, in which the son reacts to the change in his inner relationship to his parents, especially that to his father. In this romance, the child's early years are governed by overestimation of his father, represented by a king in dreams. Later, influenced by rivalry and disappointment, the release from the parents and a critical attitude towards the father sets in. The two families of the myth, the noble as well as the humble one, are therefore both images of the child's own family as they appear to the child in successive periods.

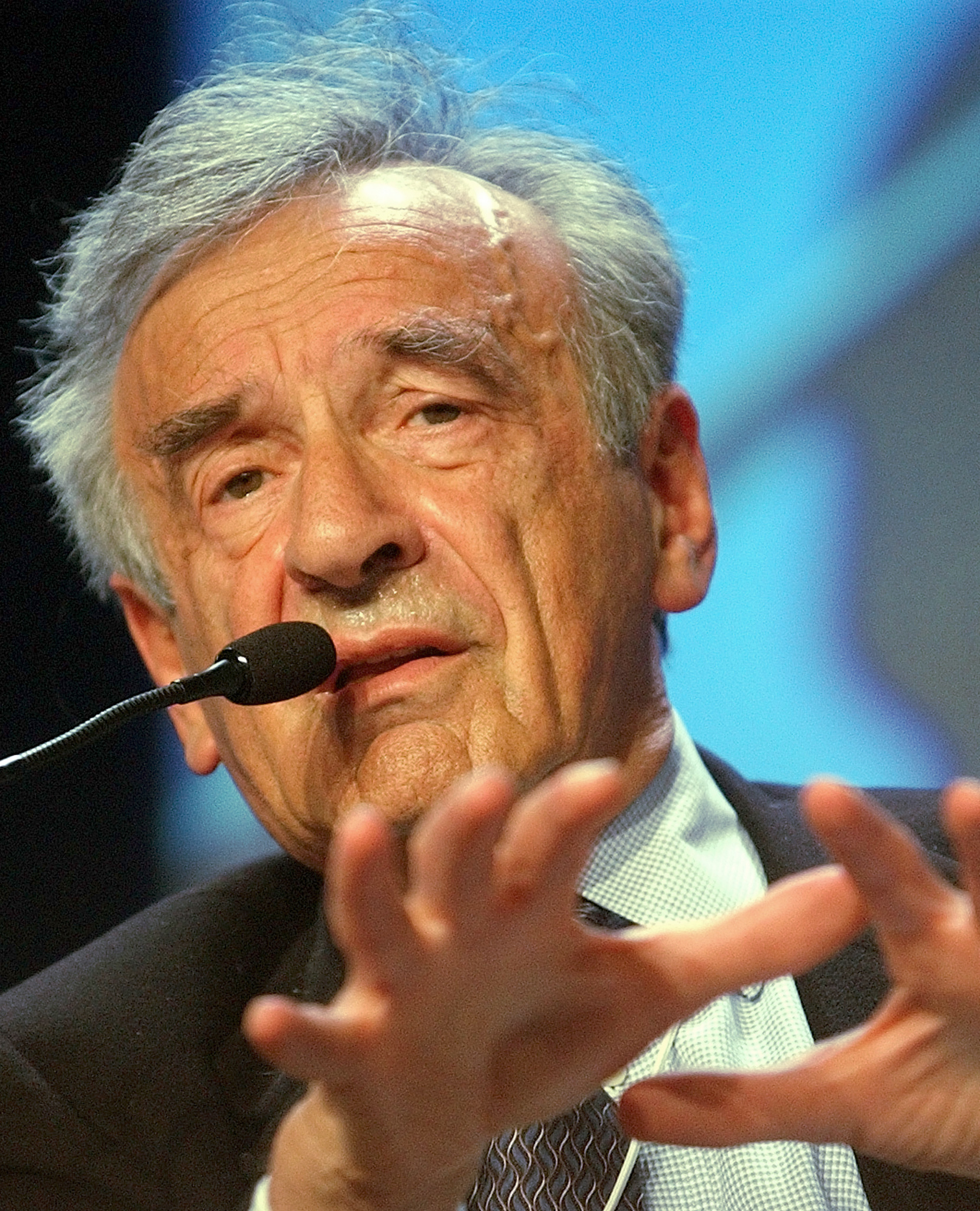
Wiesel

Elie Wiesel argued that Moses ran away from Egypt in Exodus 2:15 because he was disappointed with his fellow Jews. Pharaoh would not have punished him for killing a lower-class Egyptian or admonishing a Jewish supervisor. There were only three people present when Moses killed the Egyptian—the Egyptian, who could not tell the story, because he was dead; Moses, who had not talked; and the Jew whom Moses had saved, who must have informed on him. When Moses realized this, that must have been when he decided to run away.

=== Exodus chapter 3 ===
Moshe Greenberg wrote that one may see the entire Exodus story as “the movement of the fiery manifestation of the divine presence.” Similarly, William Propp identified fire (אֵשׁ, esh) as the medium in which God appears on the terrestrial plane—in the Burning Bush of Exodus 3:2, the cloud pillar of Exodus 13:21–22 and 14:24, atop Mount Sinai in Exodus 19:18 and 24:17, and upon the Tabernacle in Exodus 40:38.

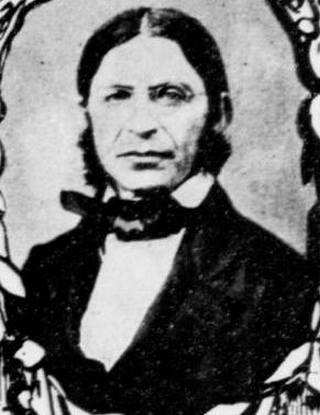
Geiger

Reading verses such as Exodus 3:6, 15, and 16, and 4:5, that identify God as the God of Abraham, Isaac, and Jacob, Abraham Geiger wrote that Judaism does not claim to be the work of individuals, but of the whole people. "It does not speak of the God of Moses, or of the God of the Prophets, but of the God of Abraham, Isaac and Jacob, of the God of the whole race."

Nathan MacDonald reported some dispute over the exact meaning of the description of the Land of Israel as a "land flowing with milk and honey," as in Exodus 3:8 and 17, 13:5, and 33:3, Leviticus 20:24, Numbers 13:27 and 14:8, and Deuteronomy 6:3, 11:9, 26:9 and 15, 27:3, and 31:20. MacDonald wrote that the term for milk (חָלָב, chalav) could easily be the word for "fat" (חֵלֶב, chelev), and the word for honey (דְבָשׁ, devash) could indicate not bees' honey but a sweet syrup made from fruit. The expression evoked a general sense of the bounty of the land and suggested an ecological richness exhibited in several ways, not just with milk and honey. MacDonald noted that the expression was always used to describe a land that the people of Israel had not yet experienced, and thus characterized it as always a future expectation.

The Tetragrammaton in Paleo-Hebrew (10th century BCE to 135 CE), old Aramaic (10th century BCE to 4th century CE) and square Hebrew (3rd century BCE to present) scripts

Reading Exodus 3:14–15, Robert Oden taught that God's Name אֶהְיֶה אֲשֶׁר אֶהְיֶה, Ehyeh Asher Ehyeh, "I am Who I am" or "I will be Who I will be," employed the first person singular form of the verb "to be," and then the four-letter Name of God, יְהוָה, YHVH, looks like the third-person masculine singular causative form of the verb "to be," as in "he who causes to be," which Oden argued was likely part of a longer epithet attached to the Canaanite god El, the high god of the Canaanites. Oden argued that Ehyeh was an alternate, early, ancient version of YHVH that came from a separate, likely Amorite dialect, and was thus the same name. Oden noted that in Exodus 3 and 6, God identified God's self in relation to people—not a place. Oden posited that the occasion for the revelation of the four-letter Name of God, יְהוָה, YHVH, was the coming together of the 12 tribes of Israel as a new confederation (as described in Joshua 24).

=== Exodus chapter 4 ===
Everett Fox noted that “glory” (כְּבוֹד, kevod) and “stubbornness” (כָּבֵד לֵב, kaved lev) are leading words throughout the book of Exodus that give it a sense of unity. Similarly, Propp identified the root kvd—connoting heaviness, glory, wealth, and firmness—as a recurring theme in Exodus: Moses suffered from a heavy mouth in Exodus 4:10 and heavy arms in Exodus 17:12; Pharaoh had firmness of heart in Exodus 7:14; 8:11, 28; 9:7, 34; and 10:1; Pharaoh made Israel's labor heavy in Exodus 5:9; God in response sent heavy plagues in Exodus 8:20; 9:3, 18, 24; and 10:14, so that God might be glorified over Pharaoh in Exodus 14:4, 17, and 18; and the book culminates with the descent of God's fiery Glory, described as a “heavy cloud,” first upon Sinai and later upon the Tabernacle in Exodus 19:16; 24:16–17; 29:43; 33:18, 22; and 40:34–38.

Diagram of the Documentary Hypothesis

== In critical analysis ==
Some scholars who follow the Documentary Hypothesis find evidence of five separate sources in the parashah. These scholars see the bulk of the story as the weaving together of accounts composed by the Jahwist—(sometimes abbreviated J) who wrote in the south, in the land of the Tribe of Judah, possibly as early as the 10th century BCE—and the Elohist—(sometimes abbreviated E) who wrote in the north, in the land of the Tribe of Ephraim, possibly as early as the second half of the 9th century BCE. One such scholar, Richard Elliott Friedman, credits the Jahwist with Exodus 1:6 and 22; 2:1–23a; 3:2–4a, 5, 7–8, and 19–22; 4:19–20 and 24–26; and 5:1–2. And he credits the Elohist with Exodus 1:8–12 and 15–21; 3:1, 4b, 6, and 9–18; 4:1–18, 20b–21a, 22–23, and 27–31; and 5:3–6:1. Friedman attributes one small change—making plural the word "sons" in Exodus 4:20—to the editor (sometimes called the Redactor of JE, or RJE) who combined the Jahwist and Elohist sources in the years following 722 BCE. Friedman then attributes three small insertions—Exodus 1:7 and 13–14; and 2:23b–25—to the Priestly source who wrote in the 6th or 5th century BCE. Finally, Friedman attributes to a late Redactor (sometimes abbreviated R) two further changes—the opening verses of the parashah at Exodus 1:1–5 and 4:21b. For a similar distribution of verses, see the display of Exodus according to the Documentary Hypothesis at Wikiversity.

== Commandments ==
According to Maimonides and the Sefer ha-Chinuch, there are no commandments in the parashah.

== In the liturgy ==
The Passover Haggadah, in the magid section of the Seder, quotes Exodus 1:7 to elucidate the report in Deuteronomy 26:5 that the Israelites had become "great" and "mighty."

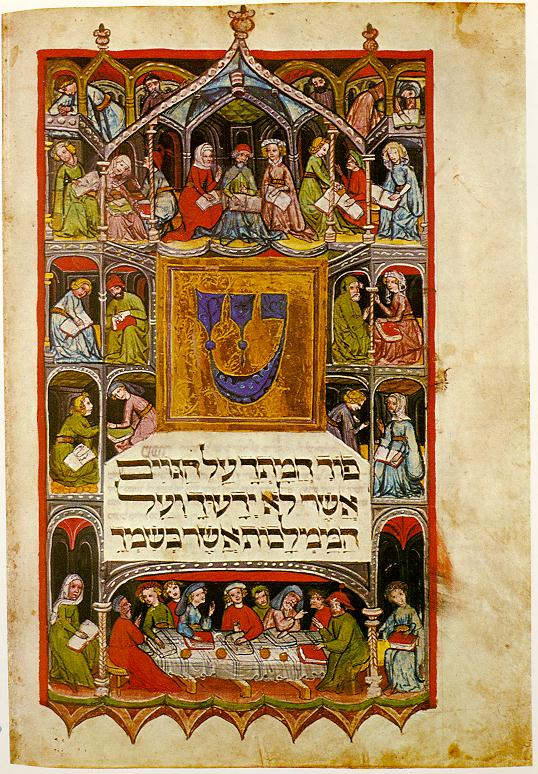
A page from a 14th-century German Haggadah

Next, the Haggadah cites Exodus 1:10–13 to elucidate the report in Deuteronomy 26:6 that "the Egyptians dealt ill with us [the Israelites], and afflicted us, and laid upon us hard bondage." The Haggadah quotes Exodus 1:10 for the proposition that the Egyptians attributed evil intentions to the Israelites or dealt ill with them. The Haggadah quotes Exodus 1:11 for the proposition that the Egyptians afflicted the Israelites. And the Haggadah quotes Exodus 1:13 for the proposition that the Egyptians imposed hard labor on the Israelites.

Also in the magid section, the Haggadah quotes Exodus 1:14 to answer the question: For what purpose do Jews eat bitter herbs (maror)? The Haggadah quotes Exodus 1:14 for the proposition that Jews do so because the Egyptians embittered the Israelites' lives in Egypt.

Also in the magid section, the Haggadah cites Exodus 1:22, 2:23–25, and 3:9 to elucidate the report in Deuteronomy 26:7 that "we cried to the Lord, the God of our fathers, and the Lord heard our voice, and saw our affliction, and our toil, and our oppression." The Haggadah quotes Exodus 1:22 to explain the Israelites' travail, interpreting that travail as the loss of the baby boys. The Haggadah quotes Exodus 2:23 for the proposition that the Israelites cried to God. The Haggadah quotes Exodus 2:24 for the proposition that God heard the Israelites' voice. The Haggadah quotes Exodus 2:25 for the proposition that God saw the Israelites' affliction, interpreting that affliction as the suspension of family life. And the Haggadah quotes Exodus 3:9 to explain the Israelites' oppression, interpreting that oppression as pressure or persecution.

And shortly thereafter, the Haggadah quotes Exodus 4:17 to elucidate the term "signs" in Deuteronomy 26:8, interpreting the "sign" to mean the staff of Moses.

God's identification in Exodus 3:6 as "the God of Abraham, the God of Isaac, and the God of Jacob" is reflected in the first blessing of the Amidah prayer.

The "cry" (tza'akah) of the Israelites that God acknowledged in Exodus 3:7 appears in the Ana B'khoah prayer for deliverance recited in the Kabbalat Shabbat prayer service between Psalm 29 and Lekhah Dodi.

According to a midrash, Exodus 3:12 states God's intention in removing Israel from Egyptian slavery when it says, "you shall serve God upon this mountain." And it was to this service that Moses dedicated the Tabernacle, and it was on the day that Moses completed the Tabernacle that Moses composed Psalm 91, which Jews recite in the Pseukei D'Zimrah section of the morning (Shacharit) prayer service.

The exchange of Moses and God in Exodus 3:13–14 about God's name is in part about how we as humans can perceive God, and that in turn is one of the motivations of prayer.

Some Jews read about the staff of Moses in Exodus 4:17 as they study Pirkei Avot chapter 5 on a Sabbath between Passover and Rosh Hashanah.

== The Weekly Maqam ==
In the Weekly Maqam, Sephardi Jews each week base the songs of the services on the content of that week's parashah. For Parashat Shemot, Sephardi Jews apply Maqam Rast, the maqam that shows a beginning or an initiation of something, as Parashat Shemot initiates the Book of Exodus.

== Haftarah ==
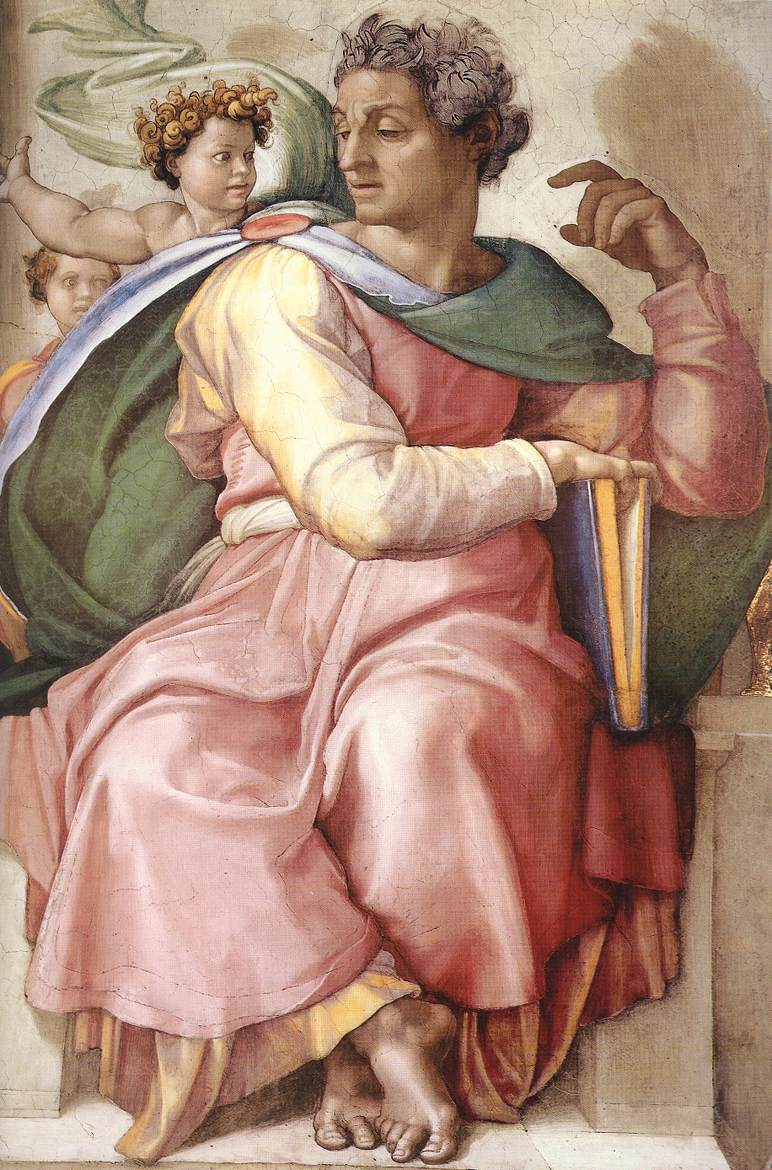
Isaiah (1509 fresco by Michelangelo)

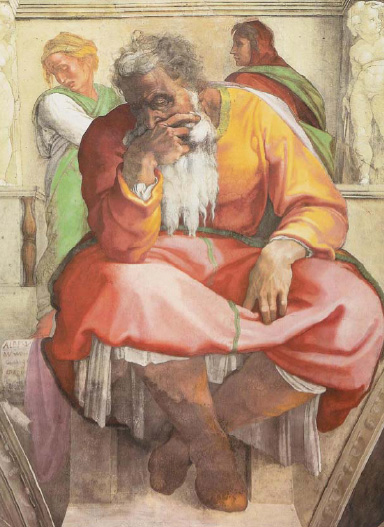
Jeremiah (fresco circa 1508–1512 by Michelangelo)

The haftarah for the parashah is:

- for Ashkenazi Jews: Isaiah 27:6–28:13 and 29:22–23
- for Sephardi Jews: Jeremiah 1:1–2:3

=== Ashkenazi—Isaiah 27 ===
The parashah and haftarah in Isaiah 27 both address how Israel could prepare for God's deliverance. Rashi in his commentary on Isaiah 27:6–8 drew connections between the fruitfulness of Isaiah 27:6 and Exodus 1:4, between the killings of Isaiah 27:7 and God's slaying of Pharaoh's people in, for example, Exodus 12:29, and between the winds of Isaiah 27:8 and those that drove the Reed Sea in Exodus 14:21.

=== Sephardi—Jeremiah 1 ===
The parashah and haftarah in Jeremiah 1 both report the commissioning of a prophet, Moses in the parashah and Jeremiah in the haftarah. In both the parashah and the haftarah, God calls to the prophet, the prophet resists, citing his lack of capacity, but God encourages the prophet and promises to be with him.
