= Zipporah at the inn =

Biblical event recorded in the book of Exodus

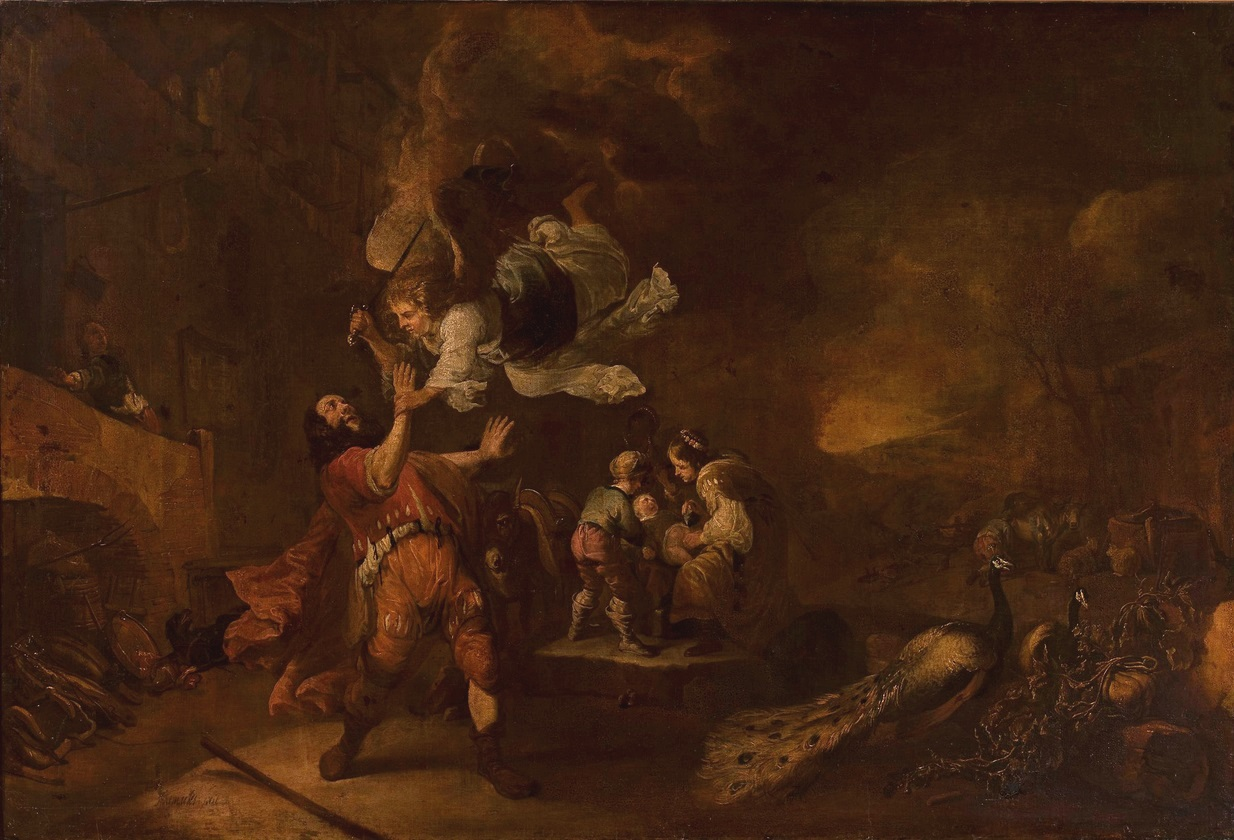
The Circumcision of son of Moses, Jan Baptist Weenix c. 1640

Zipporah at the Inn is the name given to an episode alluded to in three verses in the 4th chapter of the Book of Exodus. The much-debated passage is one of the more perplexing conundrums of the Torah due to ambiguous references through pronouns and phrases with unclear designations. Various translations of the Bible have sought to make the section clearer through a restructuring of the sentences with a more indirect, yet more straightforward, interpretation.

== Passage ==
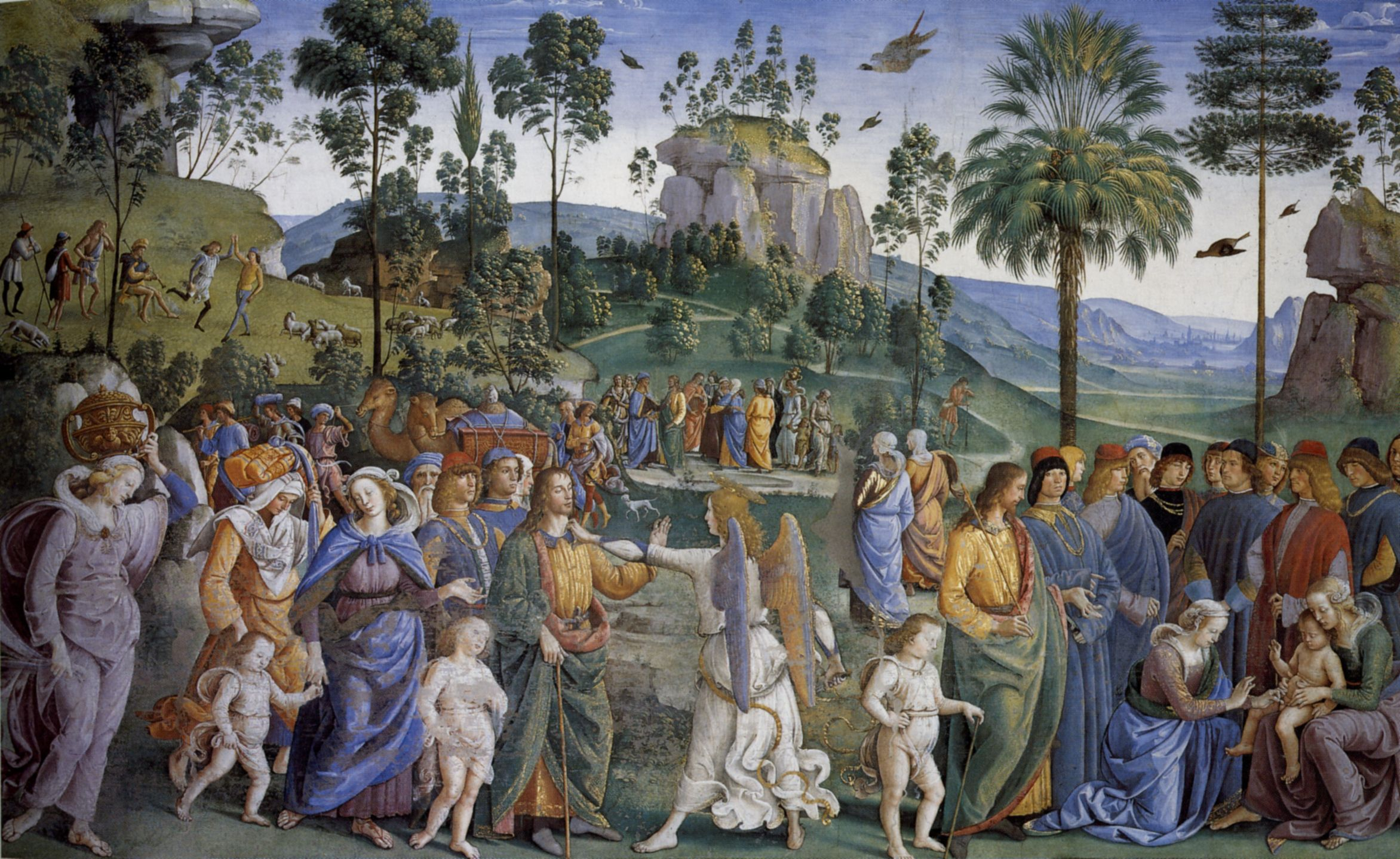
Moses Leaving for Egypt by Pietro Perugino, c. 1482. Zipporah is in blue with her sons on the left side of the image, and on kneeling on the right, circumcising her son

The story of Zipporah at the Inn occurs through Exodus 4:24–26, when Moses, his wife Zipporah and their son Gershom reach an inn on their way to Egypt. Moses and his family have been tasked to travel from Midian to announce the plagues to the Pharaoh, but are interrupted by the Lord:

Leningrad Codex text:

24. וַיְהִ֥י בַדֶּ֖רֶךְ בַּמָּלֹ֑ון וַיִּפְגְּשֵׁ֣הוּ יְהוָ֔ה וַיְבַקֵּ֖שׁ הֲמִיתֹֽו׃
25. וַתִּקַּ֨ח צִפֹּרָ֜ה צֹ֗ר וַתִּכְרֹת֙ אֶת־עָרְלַ֣ת בְּנָ֔הּ וַתַּגַּ֖ע לְרַגְלָ֑יו וַתֹּ֕אמֶר כִּ֧י חֲתַן־דָּמִ֛ים אַתָּ֖ה לִֽי׃
26. וַיִּ֖רֶף מִמֶּ֑נּוּ אָ֚ז אָֽמְרָ֔ה חֲתַ֥ן דָּמִ֖ים לַמּוּלֹֽת׃ פ

Ancient Greek translation (Septuagint):

24. ἐγένετο δὲ ἐν τῇ ὁδῷ· ἐν τῷ καταλύματι συνήντησεν αὐτῷ ἄγγελος Κυρίου καὶ ἐζήτει αὐτὸν ἀποκτεῖναι.
25. καὶ λαβοῦσα Σεπφώρα ψῆφον περιέτεμε τὴν ἀκροβυστίαν τοῦ υἱοῦ αὐτῆς καὶ προσέπεσε πρὸς τοὺς πόδας αὐτοῦ καὶ εἶπεν: «ἔστη τὸ αἷμα τῆς περιτομῆς τοῦ παιδίου μου.»
26. καὶ ἀπῆλθεν ἀπ᾿ αὐτοῦ, διότι εἶπεν: «ἔστη τὸ αἷμα τῆς περιτομῆς τοῦ παιδίου μου.»

King James Version translation:

24. And it came to pass by the way in the inn, that the Lord met him, and sought to kill him.
25. Then Zipporah took a sharp stone, and cut off the foreskin of her son, and cast it at his feet, and said, "Surely a bloody husband art thou to me."
26. So he let him go: then she said, A bloody husband thou art, because of the circumcision.

New Revised Standard Version translation:

24. On the way, at a place where they spent the night, the Lord met him and tried to kill him.
25. But Zipporah took a flint and cut off her son's foreskin, and touched his feet with it, and said, "Truly you are a bridegroom of blood to me!"
26. So he let him alone. It was then she said, "A bridegroom of blood by circumcision."

The standard interpretation of the passage is that God wanted to kill Moses for neglecting the rite of circumcision of his son. Zipporah averts disaster by reacting quickly and hastily performing the rite, thus saving her husband from God's anger. (Shemot Rabbah 5:8)

== Various interpretations ==
The "cryptic" passage has inspired spirited debate in no small measure. It raises numerous questions:

What keeps Moses from reacting? Why is circumcision necessary? Why does Zipporah perform the circumcision? Whose feet are touched with the foreskin? What is the meaning of Zipporah's incantation? Who is the "bridegroom of blood?" Why does Yahweh withdraw?

One problem is the text's usage of pronouns, which never identify which of the three individuals (God, Moses, or Zipporah's son) is being referred to. In particular, it is unclear whom God sought to kill (Moses or Zipporah's son), whose feet (God's, Moses's, or her son's) Zipporah touches with the foreskin, whom (God, Moses, or her son) Zipporah is addressing as her "bloody bridegroom," and the meaning of the phrase "bloody bridegroom" itself.

=== Rabbinic ===
The ambiguous or fragmentary nature of the verses leaves much room for exegesistical extrapolation, and rabbinical scholarship has provided numerous explanations. The earliest Jewish interpretations almost unanimously infer that Moses failed to circumcise his son, thereby angering God and provoking the attack, but Zipporah's quick action in circumcising her son appeases God and ends the confrontation. The Talmud understands this episode to underscore the primacy of the biblical command for fathers to promptly circumcise their sons (either on the eighth day or at the first opportunity thereafter), such that even someone of Moses's accrued merit and stature was not exempt from punishment by death for delaying his son's circumcision even briefly.

While the passage is frequently interpreted as referring to Gershom, Moses's firstborn, being circumcised, Rashi, citing the Midrash Exodus Rabbah, states that the passage instead refers to Eliezer, Moses's other son.

The Targum Neophyti, a medieval midrashic translation of the Pentateuch into Aramaic, expands Zipporah's enigmatic "you are truly a bridegroom of blood" to "How beloved is the blood that has delivered this bridegroom from the hand of the Angel of Death."

The question of how Moses, of all people, could have neglected to have his son circumcised and thus incurred the wrath of God was debated in classical Jewish scholarship. Rabbi El'azar ha-Moda'i argues that Jethro had placed an additional condition on the marriage between his daughter and Moses—that their firstborn son would be given over to idolatry and thus explaining why Moses was viewed negatively by God. One Midrashic interpretation is that, while God allowed Moses to put off circumcising his son until they reached Egypt, rather than weaken him before the journey, Moses did not hasten to perform the task as soon as possible after he had arrived.

Rabbinical commentators have asked how Zipporah knew that the act of circumcising her son would save her husband. Rashi, citing Talmudic and Midrashic sources, explains that the angel of God (which the Talmud, Nedarim 32a identifies as either Af or Hemah, the personifications of anger and fury), in the shape of a serpent, had swallowed Moses up to, but not including, his genitals, and that Zipporah therefore understood that this had happened on account of the delay in circumcising her son. Haberman (2003), connecting this episode to the story of Eve and the serpent, argues that Zipporah immediately understood that the threat was related to circumcision by a "psychoanalytic link" between Moses's penis and his son's, the ambiguous use of pronouns taken as indicating the fundamental identity of the deity, her husband and her son in the woman's subconscious.

=== Samaritan ===
The Samaritan Pentateuch differs from the Jewish Masoretic Text in many details. According to the Samaritan version of this episode, Zipporah realized that God was angry at Moses for bringing her and their two sons along on the divine mission to free the Israelites from bondage in Egypt, and cut herself to demonstrate her repentance and prove herself worthy of joining her husband. This different narrative arises from the voweling of the Hebrew root word בנה (b-n-h). Whereas the Masoretic version states that Zipporah circumcised "her son" (b'nah; בְּנָהּ), the Samaritan text describes her as having circumcised "her understanding" or "her blocked heart" (binnah; בִּנָּהּ, Samaritan alphabet: ࠁࠪࠍ࠙ࠣࠄ). Moses saw Zipporah's act of self-mutilation as a remnant of his wife's idolatrous upbringing, and a demonstration that God's displeasure at her presence was indeed well-founded. Therefore, Moses sent Zipporah and their two sons back to her family in Midian. This assuaged God's wrath and spared Moses's life. It was only after the parting of the Red Sea and the Israelites' miraculous escape from Egypt that Moses's father-in-law Jethro brought Zipporah and her sons to rejoin Moses at the Israelite camp in the desert.

=== Modern scholarship ===
Many biblical scholars consider the passage fragmentary.

James Kugel (1998) suggests that the point of the episode is the explanation of the expression "bridegroom of blood" (חתן דמים), apparently current in biblical times. The story would seem to illustrate that the phrase does not imply that a bridegroom should or may be circumcised at the time of his marriage, but that Moses by being bloodied by the foreskin of his son became a "bridegroom of blood" to Zipporah. The story has also been interpreted as emphasizing the point that the circumcision must be performed exactly at the prescribed time, as a delay was not granted even to Moses.

German orientalist Walter Beltz thought that the original myth behind this story was about the right of Yahweh, as an ancient fertility god, to receive in sacrifice the first-born son. He reasons that the pronouns cannot refer to Moses, since he is not mentioned in the text preceding the passage. Moreover, the preceding text speaks of Israel as Yahweh's first born son and that Yahweh would kill the Pharaoh's first born son for not letting Israel out of Egypt. It is obvious, he concludes, that this leads the writer to insert this story about another first born son, Moses's. Accordingly, it can only mean that Yahweh wants to take possession of the son of Moses because he is entitled to the first-born male. The mother undertakes the circumcision, an ancient matriarchal relic, and touches Yahweh's genitals with the child's foreskin. Only this makes sense when she uses the marriage formula "you are my bridegroom of blood". For in doing so, she transfers the child of Moses into a marriage with Yahweh, making him a child of Yahweh. The complete sacrifice of the boy is replaced by the sacrifice of a part of the penis. The biblical redactor still bore this in mind when he added: "At that time she said 'bridegroom of blood,' referring to circumcision." Originally, young boys were sacrificed to the pantheistic Cretan and Phoenician goddesses only after the priestesses had consummated ritual intercourse, the sacred marriage, with them. Thus, some scholars argue this text comes from the same category as such practices.

Meanwhile, William H. Propp argues that, assuming that this episode derives from the Jahwist ("J") source, links God's attack with Moses's killing of the Egyptian taskmaster (Exodus 2:11–12), which had not yet been expiated. Just as the paschal sacrifice would later on cause the Angel of Death to "pass over" the homes of the Hebrews, here the ritualistic spilling of his son's blood through circumcision atones for Moses's wrongdoing – "the bloodied child became a symbol of the paschal night, when the endangered first-born of Israel were saved by the blood of a lamb."

== Identity of the attacker ==
The Masoretic text of Exodus suggests that Yahweh himself performed the attack on Moses (or on his son). However, the Septuagint makes the attacker an "angel of the Lord" (angelos kyriou), although this change may have been done to "mitigate the harshness of the account."

The version in the Book of Jubilees (2nd century BC) attributes the attack to Prince Mastema, a title that was another name for Satan:

...and what Prince Mastema desired to do with you when you returned to Egypt, on the way when you met him at the shelter. Did he not desire to kill you with all of his might and save the Egyptians from your hand because he saw that you were sent to execute judgment and vengeance upon the Egyptians? And I delivered you from his hand and you did the signs and wonders which you were sent to perform in Egypt.

— Jubilees 48:2–4

The Septuagint version does not say "the Lord" (κύριος) but "the Angel of the Lord" (ἄγγελος κυρίου). "Angel" (ἄγγελος) is the translation throughout the Septuagint of the Hebrew mal'ak, the term for the manifestation of Yahweh to humanity. (It is the mal'ak that is first described as appearing in the form of a burning bush, but the Lord himself that is the subject during the rest of the conversation with the burning bush).

== Sources ==
- Walter Beltz, Gott und die Götter. Biblische Mythologie, Aufbau-Verlag Berlin, 1990, ISBN 3-351-00976-3.
- James L. Kugel, Traditions of the Bible: a guide to the Bible as it was at the start of the common era, Harvard University Press, 1998, ISBN 978-0-674-79151-0.
- Shera Aranoff Tuchman, Sandra E. Rapoport, Moses' women, KTAV Publishing House, Incorporated, 2008, ISBN 978-1-60280-017-5, pp. 127–139.
