= Gershon (name) =

Gershon (Hebrew: גֵּרְשׁוֹן) was the oldest son of Levi in the Torah.

Gershon may also refer to:

== Surname ==
- Amit Gershon (born 1995), Israeli basketball player
- Pini Gershon (born 1951), Israeli basketball player and coach
- Gina Gershon (born 1962), American actress
- Grant Gershon (born 1960), American pianist, conductor, chorus master
- Karen Gerşon Şarhon (born 1958), Turkish scholar
- Michael D. Gershon, American neurobiologist and author of The Second Brain
- Nina Gershon (born 1940), American jurist
- Peter Gershon (born 1947), British business executive and civil servant
- Rami Gershon (born 1988), Israeli footballer
- Yitzhak Gershon (born 1958), Israeli general

== Given name ==
- Gershon Agron (1894–1959), mayor of Jerusalem (1955–59)
- Gershon Ben-Shakhar (born 1942), Israeli psychologist and former President of the Open University of Israel
- Gershon Kingsley (1922–2019), German-American composer
- Gershon Lasch (1803–1883), German educator and writer
- Gershon Legman (1917–1999), American folklorist
- Ted "Kid" Lewis (born Gershon Mendeloff; 1893–1970), English world champion Hall of Fame welterweight boxer
- Gershon Sirota (1874–1943), Polish cantor

== See also ==
- Hershon
- Gershom (disambiguation)
- Gerson (disambiguation)
- ben Gershon
- Gershuni
