= Shebuel =

Biblical character

Shebuel (Hebrew: שְׁבוּאֵל Šəḇū’ēl) was a descendant of Gershom, the son of Moses and Zipporah. He, along with his kinsman Rehabiah a descendant of Eliezer, were described as chiefs and included in the Tribe of Levi. Shebuel is also described as "ruler of the treasures". His name means "captive of God" or "returned of God". His patrilineal lineage can be traced back to Abraham, Isaac, and Jacob since Levi is both his great-great grandfather (through Jochebed) and great-great-great grandfather (through Amram). He is also descended from Jethro and Jethro's ancestor Midian, son of Abraham and his second wife Keturah, through his paternal grandmother Zipporah.

The Books of Chronicles identify Shebuel as a "son" of Gershom, though this is anachronistic for a literal interpretation of the Bible, since Shebuel is described as living in the time of King David. The Hebrew word for "son" can also mean descendant; for example even remote descendants of King David are in many instances identified as "So-and-so son of David" in the original Hebrew.
