= Gerson =

Gerson may refer to:

== Given name ==
- Gerson Baldé (born 2000), Portuguese athlete
- Gerson von Bleichröder (1822–1893), Jewish German banker
- Gerson Brenner (1959–2026), Brazilian actor and model
- Gérson Caçapa (born 1967), Brazilian former footballer
- Gerson Goldhaber (1924–2010), German-born American particle physicist and astrophysicist
- Gerson Guimarães Júnior, (born 1992), Brazilian footballer
- Gérson Magrão (born 1985), Brazilian footballer
- Gerson Mayen (born 1989), Salvadoran-American footballer
- Gérson or Gérson de Oliveira Nunes (born 1941), Brazilian footballer
- Gerson Rosenzweig (1861–1914), writer and poet
- Gerson (footballer, born 1997) (Gerson Santos da Silva), Brazilian footballer
- Gérson dos Santos (1922–2002), Brazilian footballer and manager
- Gerson dos Santos (footballer, born 1982) (Gerson Pereira dos Santos Filho), Brazilian footballer
- Gérson da Silva (1965–1994), Brazilian footballer
- Gerson Victalino (1959–2020), Brazilian Olympic basketball player
- Gerson Boom, fictional character in the video games Undertale and Deltarune

== Last name ==
- Dora Gerson (1899–1943), German Jewish actress and cabaret singer killed at Auschwitz
- Felix N. Gerson (1862–1945), American newspaper editor
- Georg Hartog Gerson (1788–1844), German surgeon in the King’s German Legion during the Napoleonic Wars
- Horst Gerson (1907–1978) was a German-Dutch art historian.
- Jean Gerson (1363–1429), French theologian and poet
- John Gerson, deputy head of MI6
- José Gerson Ramos (born 1981), Brazilian footballer also known as simply Gérson
- Karen Gerşon Şarhon (born 1958), Turkish scholar
- Lloyd P. Gerson (born 1948), American Neoplatonism scholar
- Marlene Gerson (born 1940), South African tennis player
- Max Gerson (1881–1959), German physician, known for Gerson therapy, an alternative therapy for cancer and chronic diseases
- Michael Gerson (1964–2022), newspaper columnist and former speechwriter and adviser to US President George W. Bush
- Noel Gerson (1913–1988), American author
- Victor Gerson, French resistance in World War II
- Wojciech Gerson (1831–1901), Polish painter and academic

== See also ==
- Gershon (disambiguation)
- Gershom (disambiguation)
