= Exodus: Gods and Kings =

2014 film by Ridley Scott

- Theatrical release poster
- Directed by: Ridley Scott
- Written by: Adam Cooper; Bill Collage; Jeffrey Caine; Steven Zaillian
- Based on: Book of Exodus from the Bible
- Produced by: Peter Chernin; Ridley Scott; Jenno Topping; Michael Schaefer; Mark Huffam
- Starring: Christian Bale; Joel Edgerton; John Turturro; Aaron Paul; Ben Mendelsohn; Sigourney Weaver; Ben Kingsley
- Cinematography: Dariusz Wolski
- Edited by: Billy Rich
- Music by: Alberto Iglesias
- Production companies: Chernin Entertainment; Scott Free Productions; Babieka; Volcano Films
- Distributed by: 20th Century Fox
- Release date: December 12, 2014 (United States)
- Running time: 150 minutes
- Countries: United States; United Kingdom; France
- Language: English
- Budget: $140–200 million
- Box office: $268.2 million

Exodus: Gods and Kings is a 2014 biblical epic film directed and produced by Ridley Scott, and written by Adam Cooper, Bill Collage, Jeffrey Caine, and Steven Zaillian. The film stars Christian Bale, Joel Edgerton, John Turturro, Aaron Paul, Ben Mendelsohn, Sigourney Weaver, and Ben Kingsley. It is inspired by the biblical episode of the Exodus of the Hebrews from Egypt led by Moses and related in the Book of Exodus. Development on the film was first announced by Scott in June 2012. Filming occurred primarily in Spain beginning in October 2013, with additional filming at Pinewood Studios in England.

The film was released on December 12, 2014, by 20th Century Fox, to mixed reviews. Critics praised the visual effects and cast performances, but criticized its pacing, screenplay, lack of emotional depth, and inaccuracy to the source material. The film also received accusations of whitewashing for its primarily Caucasian cast, and was banned in Egypt and in the United Arab Emirates for "historical inaccuracies". It was considered a box-office bomb, earning $268 million worldwide on a budget of $140–200 million.

== Plot ==
In 1300 B.C., Moses, a general in the household of the Egyptian royal family, prepares to attack an encamped Hittite army with Prince Ramesses at Kadesh. A High Priestess divines a prophecy, which she relates to Ramesses's father, Seti I. Seti reveals it to Moses and Ramesses: one of them will save the other during the battle and go on to become a great leader. Moses then saves Ramesses, leaving both men troubled.

Moses departs for Pithom to meet with Viceroy Hegep, who oversees the Hebrew slaves. Upon his arrival, he sees Joshua being lashed and is appalled by the other slaves' harsh conditions. Moses helps Joshua and learns that Nun is looking for him. Upon finding the old man, he discovers his true origins; born during the extermination of the Jewish heirs, the infant Moses was saved by his sister Miriam, a servant of Pharaoh's daughter. Moses is stunned at this and leaves angrily; unbeknownst to him, two Hebrews overhear Nun's story and report it to the Viceroy.

Seti dies, and Ramesses is anointed as the new Pharaoh, Ramesses II. Hegep reveals Moses's true lineage to curry favor, but Ramesses is unconvinced. At the urging of Queen Tuya, he interrogates Miriam, who denies being Moses's sister. When Ramesses threatens to cut off her arm, Moses intervenes and confirms he is a Hebrew. Although Tuya wants Moses killed, Ramesses sentences him instead to exile. Before leaving Egypt, Moses meets with his adopted mother and Miriam, who refer to him by his birth name of Moshe. Following a journey into the desert where he kills two men sent to murder him, Moses comes to Midian where he meets Zipporah and her father, Jethro. He becomes a humble shephard, marries Zipporah, and has a son, Gershom.

Years later, Moses is injured in a rockslide. Through a burning bush, he hears a voice telling him to free the Hebrews with the guidance of a boy, a messenger of the God of Abraham called Malak. Moses reveals his past to Zipporah and tells her what he has been asked to do. She opposes his leaving, but Moses departs regardless.

In Egypt, Moses reunites with Nun and Joshua and meets his brother Aaron for the first time. Moses confronts Ramesses, demanding the Hebrews be released from servitude. Ramesses refuses and mocks the existence of God; when Moses threatens him, he declares that Hebrew slaves will be put to death until Moses is killed. With no other recourse, Moses organizes a Hebrew insurgency to resist the Egyptians. Malak then declares to Moses that ten plagues will affect Egypt to demonstrate God's power.

Despite the horror of the first nine plagues, Ramesses does not free the Hebrews, even oppressing his own people to silence their complaints. Moses is horrified to learn that the tenth plague will be the death of all firstborn children but follows through with the plan, instructing the Hebrews to mark their doors with lambs' blood. That night, all of Egypt's firstborn children die, including Ramesses's infant son. Devastated, Ramesses allows the Hebrews to leave.

Moses guides his people towards the Red Sea. Still grieving his son, Ramesses assembles his army and gives chase. After making their way through a dangerous mountain pass, the Hebrews find the ocean too deep to cross. Uncertain about what to do, Moses stops for the night in despair and flings his sword into the sea. A comet then crashes into the sea, and by morning, it has separated into a path. The Egyptians catch up on their horses and chariots; Moses stays behind to fight while his people run for their lives. The Sea reverts, drowning the majority of the Egyptians who are still crossing. Ramesses survives and can only lament what he has lost. Moses leads the Hebrews back to Midian, where he reunites with Zipporah and Gershom. At Mount Sinai, he receives the Ten Commandments.

Forty years later, an elderly Moses is riding with the Ark of the Covenant. Unsure that the Hebrews will ever reach the promised land, Moses notices Malak walking besides them in the desert.

== Cast ==
- Christian Bale as Moses
- Joel Edgerton as Ramses II
- John Turturro as Seti I
- Aaron Paul as Joshua
- Ben Mendelsohn as Viceroy Hegep
- María Valverde as Zipporah
- Sigourney Weaver as Tuya
- Ben Kingsley as Nun
- Isaac Andrews as Malak
- Hiam Abbass as Bithiah
- Indira Varma as High Priestess
- Ewen Bremner as Expert
- Golshifteh Farahani as Nefertari
- Ghassan Massoud as Ramses' Grand Vizier, Paser
- Tara Fitzgerald as Miriam
- Dar Salim as Commander Khyan
- Andrew Tarbet as Aaron
- Ken Bones as Ramses' Scribe
- Philip Arditti as Viceroy Hegep's Aide

Anton Alexander has a small role as the Israelite Dathan, while Kevork Malikyan appears as Zipporah's father, Jethro.

== Production ==
=== Development and writing ===
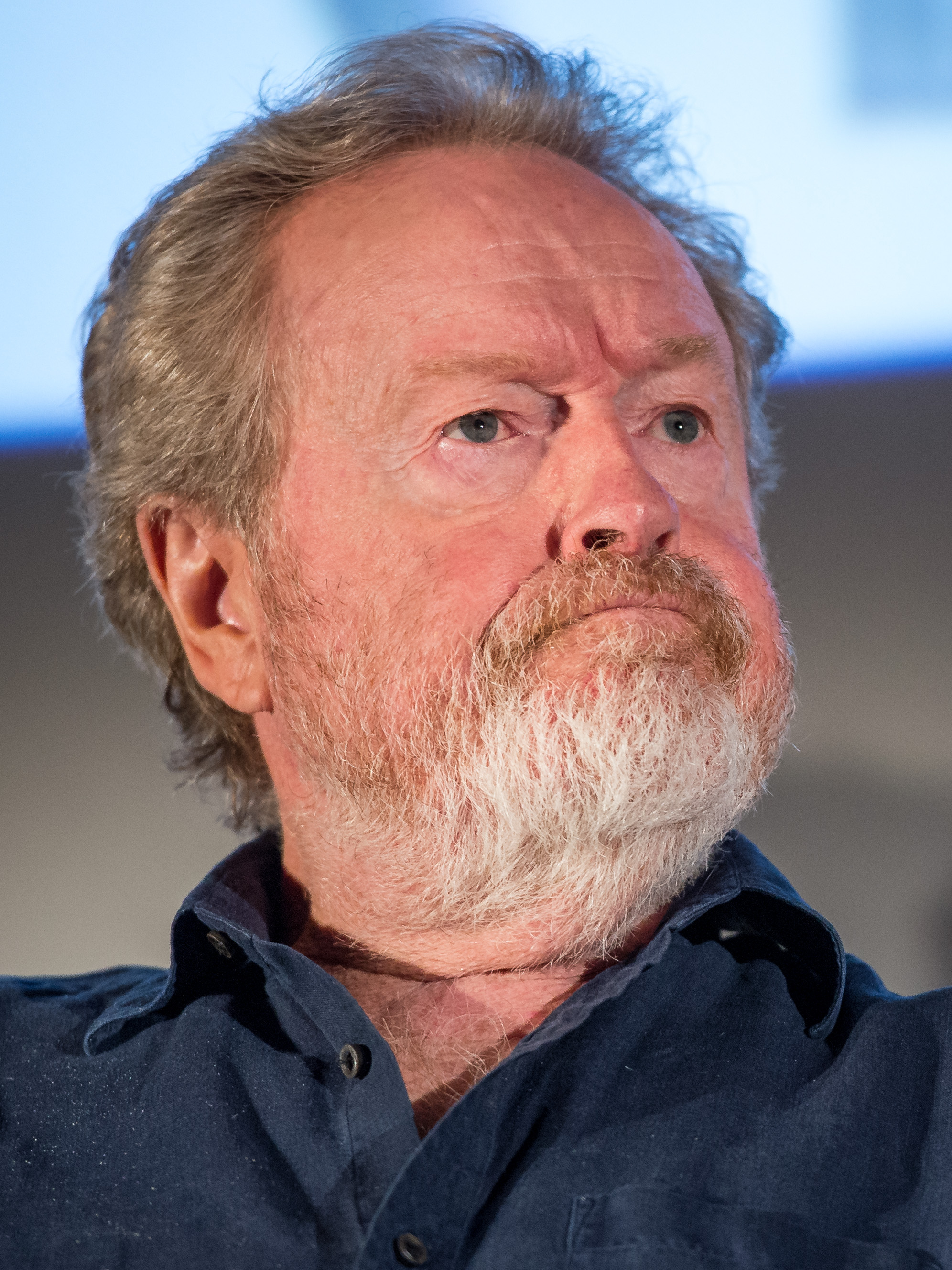
The director of the film, Ridley Scott, pictured in 2015

In June 2012, Ridley Scott announced that he was developing an adaptation of the Book of Exodus, tentatively titled Moses. The film's title was changed from Exodus to Exodus: Gods and Kings after it was discovered that Metro-Goldwyn-Mayer owned the single-word title Exodus in perpetuity.

Some controversy and criticism arose concerning biblical accuracy of the script and its portrayal. Ridley Scott publicly stated that he would be looking to natural causes for the miracles, including drainage from a tsunami for the parting of the Red Sea. According to Scott, the parting of the Red Sea was caused by a tsunami believed to have been triggered by an underwater earthquake off the Italian coast around 3000 BC. Christian Bale said of Moses, whom he portrayed, "I think the man was likely schizophrenic and was one of the most barbaric individuals that I ever read about in my life." Author Brian Godawa responded, "It's accurate to portray Moses as an imperfect hero, so Christians won't take issue with that, but to be so extreme as to call him one of the most barbaric people in history, that sounds like he's going out of his way to distance himself from the very people you’d think he wants to appeal to." The CEO of Faith-Driven Consumer, Chris Stone, criticized Bale's comments, "There's nothing in the biblical history that supports that. It's an indication that there will be a tremendous disconnect between Bale’s interpretation and the expectations of the market" and suggested that Christians would not go to cinemas to see the film.

Coincidentally, in 2011, Warner Bros. Pictures was working on its own Moses film, titled Gods and Kings, with Michael Green and Stuart Hazeldine scribing from a treatment by Matti Lesham, and Dan Lin and Lesham producing; Steven Spielberg was being eyed to direct. The following year, Spielberg was nearing commitment on the project. However, in 2013, Spielberg dropped from the project, with the last update stating Ang Lee was being eyed as replacement.

=== Casting ===
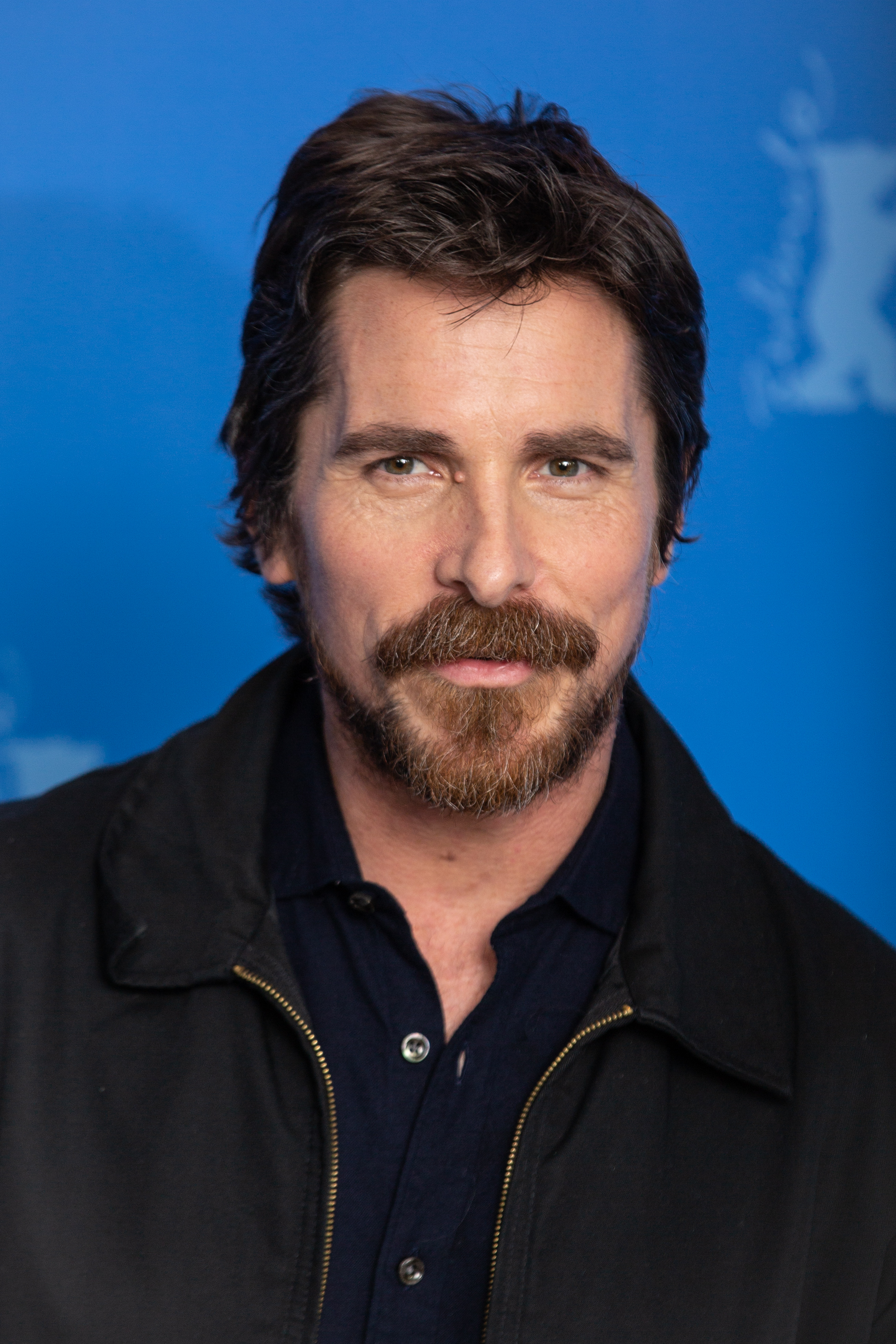
The casting of the film, particularly the role of Moses being played by Christian Bale, saw some backlash from critics.

On March 15, 2013, Deadline Hollywood reported Scott wanted Christian Bale to star in the film; in August he confirmed the role to be Moses. On the same day, Joel Edgerton joined the cast to play Ramses after Oscar Isaac turned down the role. The studio announced the casting calls in Spain's Almería and Pechina for 3,000 to 4,000 extras, and on the island of Fuerteventura for another 1,000 to 2,000 extras. On August 27, Aaron Paul joined the film to play Joshua. Sigourney Weaver, Ben Kingsley, and John Turturro were then still negotiating about joining the cast. The cast speaks with British accents despite the ancient Egyptian setting, while actors such as Sigourney Weaver retain noticeably American speech patterns, reflecting the inconsistent and stylized accent conventions often found in Hollywood historical epics.

The Sydney Morning Herald and Christian Today reported that the casting of white actors in the lead roles was being criticized. Four white actors were cast to play the Hebrew and Egyptian lead characters: Christian Bale as Moses, Joel Edgerton as Ramses II, Sigourney Weaver as Queen Tuya, and Aaron Paul as Joshua. The Sydney Morning Herald also reported the online community's observations that the film gives a European profile to the Great Sphinx of Giza. Christian Today reported that an online petition was underway. It also compared Exodus to the 1956 film The Ten Commandments with its all-white cast and said, "The racial climate, number of black actors, and opportunities provided to them were very different in 1956, however." Some Twitter users called for a boycott of the film.

More so, Forbes' Scott Mendelson said that the film did not need to be "whitewashed" and stated that "Even if we accept the argument that Moses had to be played by a world-renowned movie star and that in all likelihood that meant a white actor, I do not accept the idea that the rest of the main cast needed to be filled out with Caucasian actors of varying recognizability."

Scott responded that without the casting of big-name actors, the film would never have been approved by the studio. He said, "I can't mount a film of this budget...and say that my lead actor is Mohammad so-and-so from such-and-such...I'm just not going to get financed," and that those seeking to boycott the film on such grounds should "get a life". Bale also defended the casting of the film, suggesting audiences need to support films starring, for example, Middle Eastern or North African actors and stating, "The change will come from independent filmmaking, but audiences have to be there. Because once that happens, financiers of bigger and bigger budget films will say, 'We can actually do business here.'"

=== Filming and visual effects ===
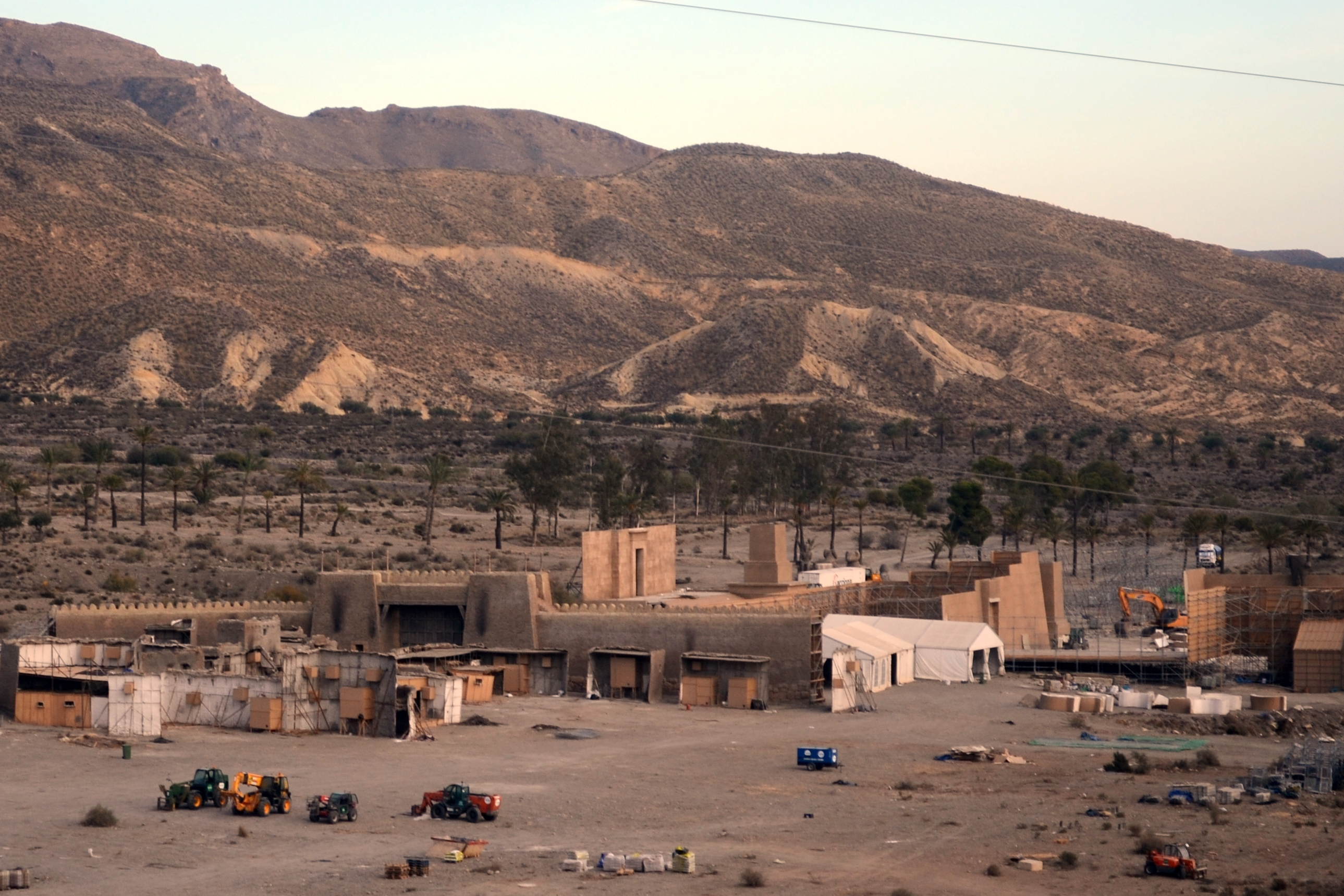
Exodus set in Pechina, Andalusia, Spain

Shooting of the film began in October 2013 in Almería, Spain. Additional filming was scheduled at Pinewood Studios, England. Shooting began on October 22 in Tabernas as the first and main location was Ouarzazate, Morocco, and in Sierra Alhamilla. The Red Sea scene was filmed at a beach on Fuerteventura, one of the Canary Islands off the northwest coast of Africa. Shooting lasted 74 days. Scott's son Luke Scott served as second unit director.

VFX supervisor Peter Chiang supervised the film's visual effects. He said that "Ridley wanted to convey the sense that everything could be natural phenomenon, like an eclipse or tsunami, not just someone waving a stick at the sea."

More than 1,500 visual effects shots were created to digitally bolster the ranks of the Hebrews and to help authentically render plagues of hail, locusts, and frogs, although 400 live frogs were used on the set. There were 400,000 humans depicted in total, with 30 to 40 people accompanying Bale while crossing the Red Sea and the rest being computer-generated imagery (CGI). CGI produced the 180-foot wave, the horses, and the chariots. In close-up shots of people fleeing across the sea bed, the filmmakers used the beach's real waters. For the hailstorm scene, the visual effects team built 30 special cannons that would fire polymer balls to bounce and shatter with the same characteristics as an ice ball. The distant hail is a computer simulation.

In an interview for Access Hollywood, Scott claimed there is a "final" version of the film four hours long.

=== Music ===
On July 8, 2014, it was announced that Alberto Iglesias would be scoring the music for the film with additional music by Harry Gregson-Williams.

== Release ==
The film was released on the weekend of December 4 and 5 on 6,462 screens and in markets such as South Korea, Mexico, Hong Kong, and India. Nationwide release in North America was on December 12 in 3,503 theaters. It was released in the United Kingdom on December 26. It was released in 2D, 3D, and IMAX 3D.

Exodus was banned in Egypt. The Egyptian culture minister Gaber Asfour described it as "a Zionist film", and said it was banned because of "historical inaccuracies", such as creating a false impression that Moses and the Jews built the pyramids.

In Morocco, the state-run Moroccan Cinema Centre (CCM) initially approved the film's screening, but officials banned it on the day before its premiere because of the personification of the voice of God. After some of the film's dialogue had been edited, the film was subsequently approved for screening.

The film was also denied release in the United Arab Emirates. Authorities said they had found "many mistakes" in the story. The director of Media Content Tracking at the National Media Council explained: "This movie is under our review and we found that there are many mistakes not only about Islam but other religions too. So, we will not release it in the UAE."

The film was dedicated to director Ridley Scott's brother Tony Scott, who died on August 19, 2012.

== Reception ==
=== Box office ===
Exodus: Gods and Kings grossed $65 million in the U.S. and Canada and $203 million in other territories for a worldwide total of $268.2 million. The film earned $8.7 million on its opening day (including previews) in the United States. The film topped the box office during its opening weekend with $24.1 million.

Outside North America, the film was released in 10 markets on December 4–5 and earned $23.1 million from 6,462 screens on its opening weekend. The following week it earned $17.8 million from 27 international markets, coming at second place at the box office behind The Hobbit: The Battle of the Five Armies. The film was number one in 13 markets. In its third week, the film added $30.9 million from 39 markets and was still halted at number two behind The Battle of the Five Armies. The highest openings came from Russia ($8 million), Brazil ($6.68 million), South Korea ($6.2 million), Mexico ($5.4 million), France ($5.35 million), the UK ($4.25 million), Spain ($3.7 million), and Germany ($3.64 million). At the end of its theatrical run, Spain proved to be the most successful country, outside of the United States, with $18.1 million, followed by Russia, Brazil, France, and the UK.

=== Critical response ===
Exodus: Gods and Kings received negative reviews from critics. They praised its acting performances and technical achievements, but criticized its pacing, thin screenwriting, and lack of character development. The film veered creatively from the Bible, and Scott's honesty about his own atheism did not help its potential appeal to a religious audience.

On Rotten Tomatoes, the film holds an approval rating of 29% based on 208 reviews, with an average rating of 5/10. The critic's consensus reads: "While sporadically stirring, and suitably epic in its ambitions, Exodus: Gods and Kings can't quite live up to its classic source material." Metacritic, the film has a weighted average score of 52 out of 100, based on 42 critics, indicating "mixed or average" reviews. Audiences surveyed by CinemaScore gave the film a grade "B−" on scale of A to F.

Stephen Farber of The Hollywood Reporter gave a positive review and said, "Scott did a great job reviving the Roman sand-and-sandals epic when he made the Oscar-winning Gladiator. This Egyptian saga is not quite in the same league, but it confirms the director's flair for widescreen imagery. Exodus has the added kick of 3D technology, and it has enough eye-popping set pieces to please adventure fans." Peter Travers of Rolling Stone was positive toward the film and said, "Exodus is a biblical epic that comes at you at maximum velocity but stays stirringly, inspiringly human." Reagan Gavin Rasquinha of The Times of India gave the film 4 out of 5 stars and said, "Exodus: Gods and Kings is 'spectacle' with a capital 'S' and in more ways than one, definitely epic." Catherine Shoard of The Guardian gave 3 out of 5 stars and said, "It’s impossible not to feel some awe at the spectacle, but more shocks would have helped see you through the two-and-a-half hour running time." Phillips Hawker of The Sydney Morning Herald gave a mixed review and awarded the film 3 out of 5 stars, saying, "Exodus: Gods And Kings... lacks Gladiator's full-on intensity and committed central performances, however; it's a mixture of the grand and the bland, and when it's not spectacular it's a little plodding." Justin Chang of Variety said, "Some may well desire a purer, fuller version of the story, one more faithful to the text and less clearly shaped by the demands of the Hollywood blockbuster. But on its own grand, imperfect terms, Exodus: Gods and Kings is undeniably transporting, marked by a free-flowing visual splendor that plays to its creator's unique strengths: Given how many faith-based movies are content to tell their audiences what to think or feel, it's satisfying to see one whose images alone are enough to compel awestruck belief." Jim Vejvoda of IGN said, "Director Ridley Scott gets lost in the desert at times in Exodus: Gods and Kings, his epic, but not entirely effective take on the story of Moses's journey from an Egyptian Royal to Hebrew leader."

On the negative side, Scott Mendelson of Forbes criticized the film for being too "dark" and "gritty", saying that the film lacked in humor and excitement, offering little nuance and little artistic interpretation beyond hitting the expected goal posts. He added, "Ridley Scott's Exodus: Gods and Kings is a terrible film. It is a badly acted and badly written melodrama that takes what should be a passionate and emotionally wrenching story and drains it of all life and all dramatic interest." Pete Hammond of Deadline Hollywood said, "Ridley Scott [can] do a plague well, and here, he gets to do 10 of them. But is this oh-so-familiar tale still fresh enough to get people into theaters in the droves needed to make back the very high production values that we see on screen?" Alonso Duralde of The Wrap also gave a negative review and said, "If you're going into Exodus: Gods and Kings thinking that director Ridley Scott is going to give the Moses story anything we didn't already get from Cecil B. DeMille in two versions of The Ten Commandments, prepare to be disappointed."

== See also ==
- Gods of Egypt
- The Ten Commandments (1956) and The Prince of Egypt (1998), the two previous major Hollywood blockbuster films based on the Book of Exodus.
- List of films featuring slavery
- Whitewashing in film
