= Gershoy =

Gershoy is a surname. Notable people with the surname include:

- Eugenie Gershoy (1901–1986), American sculptor and watercolorist
- Leo Gershoy (1897–1975), American professor of history

== See also ==
- Gershon (disambiguation)
