= Youth of Moses =

Fresco by Sandro Botticelli

The Trials of Moses
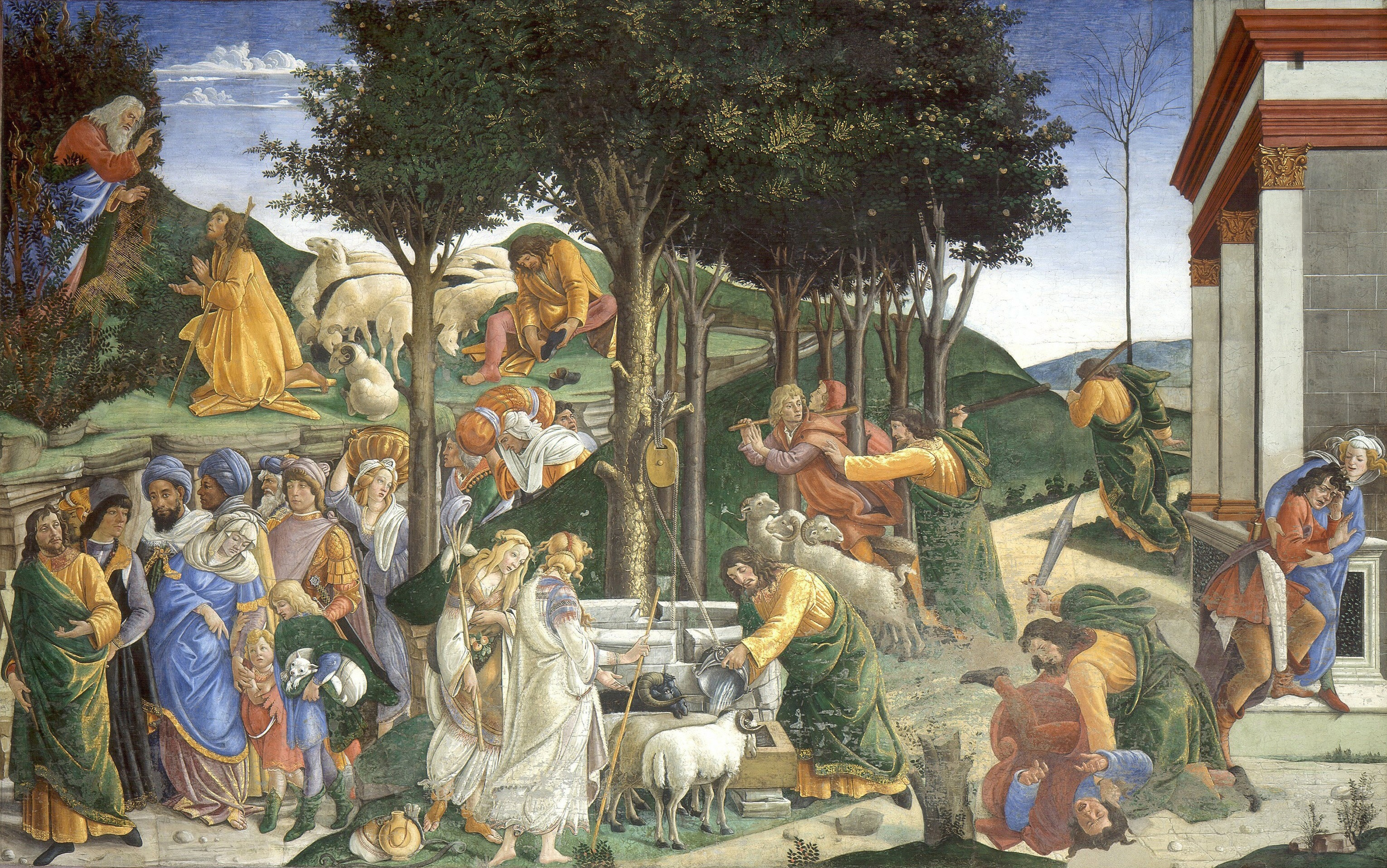
- Artist: Sandro Botticelli and assistants
- Year: 1481–1482
- Type: Fresco
- Dimensions: 348.5 cm × 558 cm (137.2 in × 220 in)
- Location: Sistine Chapel; Rome

The Youth of Moses or The Trials of Moses is a fresco by the Italian Renaissance painter Sandro Botticelli and his workshop, executed in 1481–1482 in the Sistine Chapel, Rome (modern-day Italy).

== History ==
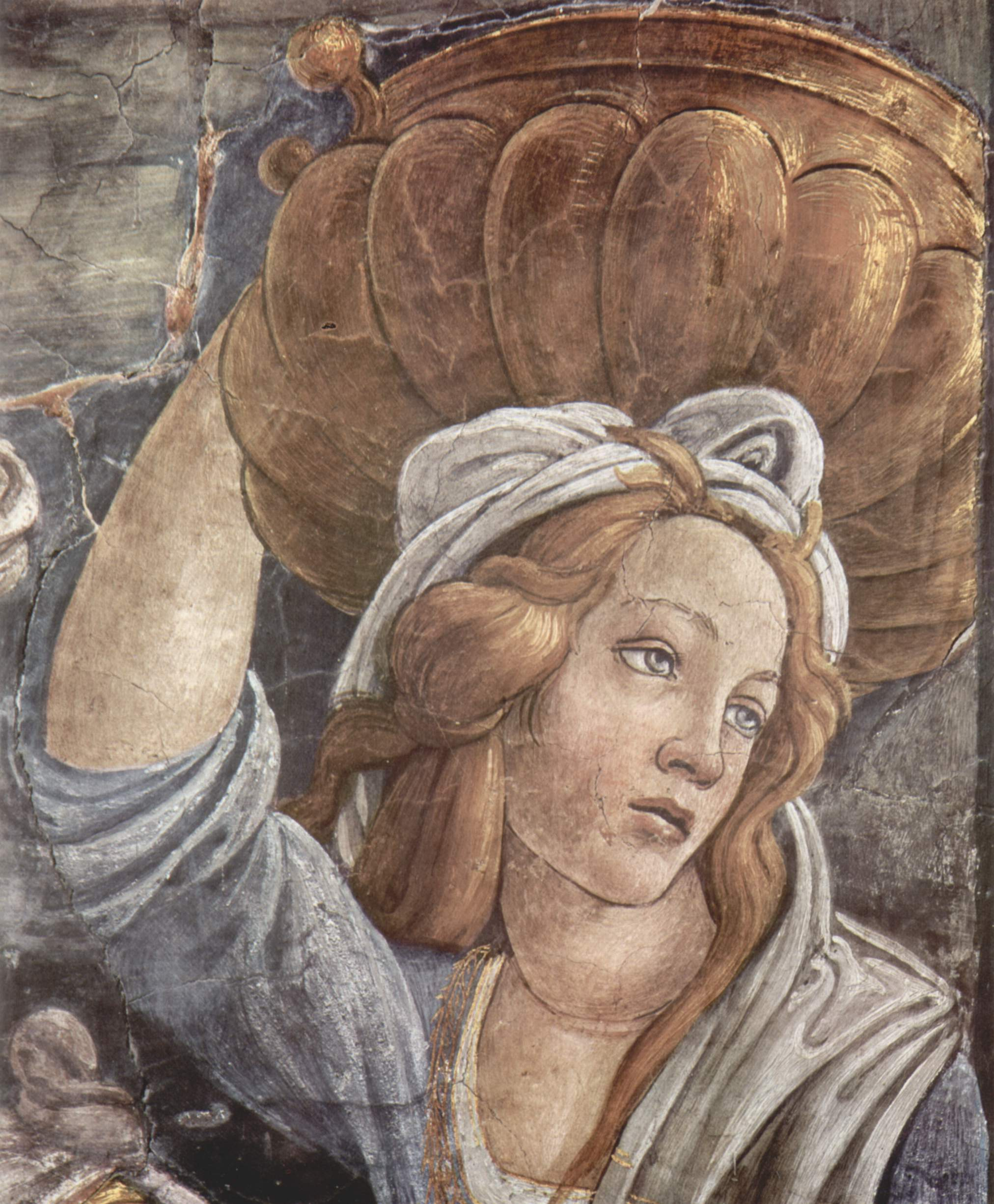
Detail of one of the women at the pit, perhaps a portrait of Simonetta Vespucci

On 27 October 1480, Botticelli, together with other Florentine painters, left for Rome where he had been called as part of the reconciliation project between Lorenzo de' Medici, the de facto ruler of Florence, and Pope Sixtus IV. The Florentines started to work in the Sistine Chapel as early as the Spring of 1481, along with Pietro Perugino, who was already there.

The theme of the decoration was a parallel between the Stories of Moses and those of Christ, as a sign of continuity between the Old and the New Testament – a continuity also between the divine law of the Tables and the message of Jesus, who, in turn, chose Peter (the first alleged bishop of Rome) as his successor: this would finally result in a legitimation of the latter's successors, the popes of Rome.

Botticelli, helped by numerous assistants, painted three scenes. On 17 February 1482 his contract was renovated, including the other scenes to complete the chapel's decoration. However, on 20 February his father died: he returned to Florence, where he remained.

== Description ==
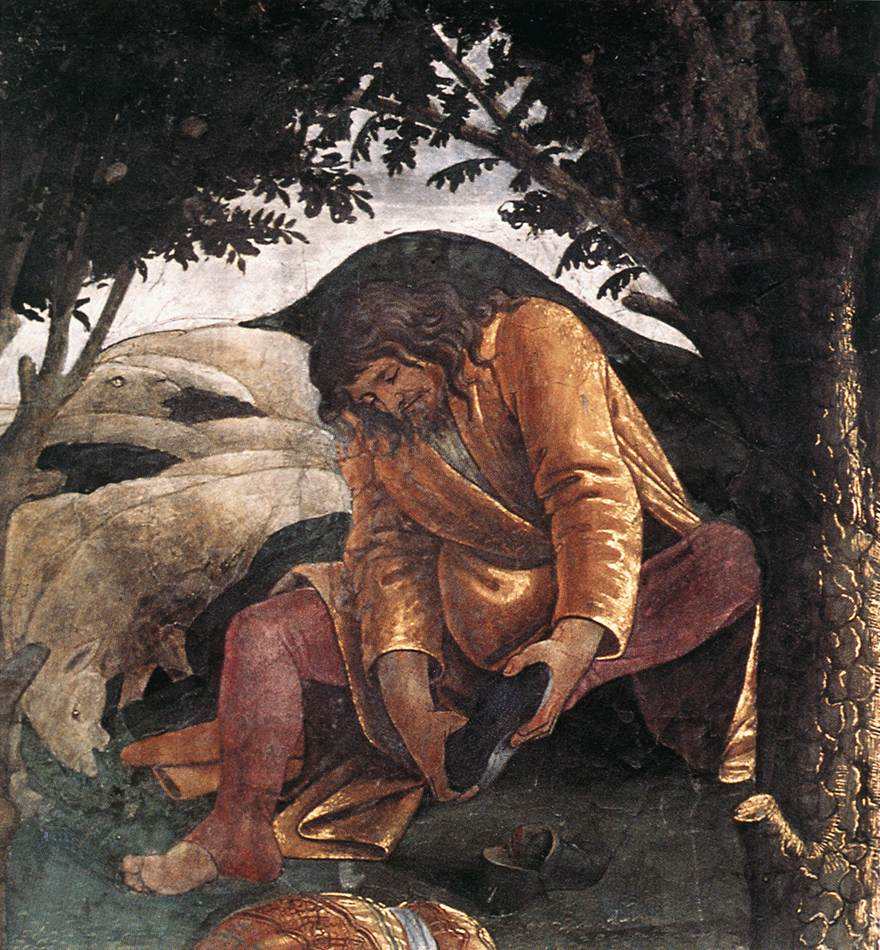
Detail of Moses removing his shoes

The fresco shows several episodes of Moses' youth, taken from Exodus. It parallels the fresco on the opposite wall, also by Botticelli, which depicts the Temptations of Jesus. The frieze has the inscription TEMPTATIO MOISI LEGIS SCRIPTAE LATORIS.

On the right is Moses killing the Egyptian who had harassed a Hebrew, and fleeing to the desert (a parallel with the episode of Jesus defeating the Devil). In the next episode Moses fights the shepherds who were preventing Jethro's daughters (including his future wife, Zipporah) to water their cattle at the pit, and then takes the water for them. In the third scene, in the upper left corner, Moses removes his shoes and then receives from God the task to return to Egypt and free his people. Finally, in the lower left corner, he drives the Jews to the Promised Land.

Moses is always distinguishable in the scenes by his yellow dress and the green cloak.

== See also ==
- List of works by Sandro Botticelli

== Sources ==
- Santi, Bruno (2001). "Botticelli". I protagonisti dell'arte italiana. Florence: Scala.
