= Lasch =

Lasch is a surname. Notable people with the surname include:

- Christopher Lasch (1932–1994), American historian, moralist, and social critic
- Gershon Lasch (1803–1883), German educator and writer
- Otto Lasch (1893–1971), German general
- Ryan Lasch (born 1987), American hockey player

== See also ==
- Lash (surname)
