= Jethro in rabbinic literature =

Allusions in Jewish rabbinic literature to the Biblical character Jethro, the father-in-law of Moses, contain various expansions, elaborations and inferences beyond what is presented in the text of the Bible itself.

== His names ==
One puzzle for the Talmudists was the difference in names presented at Numbers 10:29 and Judges 4:11, compared to Exodus 4:18: some thought that his real name was "Hobab" and that Reuel was his father; others thought that his name was "Reuel", interpreting it "the friend of God". Some modern scholars, hold that his name was "Reuel," and that "Jethro" was a title, "his Excellency".

According to Shimon bar Yochai, he had two names, "Hobab" and "Jethro". It became, however, generally accepted that he had seven names: "Reuel", "Jether", "Jethro", "Hobab", "Heber", "Keni", and "Putiel"; Eleazar's father-in-law (Exodus 6:25) being identified with Jethro by interpreting his name either as "he who abandoned idolatry" or as "who fattened calves for the sake of sacrifices to the idol".

== Previous life ==
According to the Talmud, Jethro, together with Balaam and Job, was consulted by Pharaoh as to the means for exterminating the children of Israel, and as he dissuaded Pharaoh from his design, he was recompensed in that his descendants, the Rechabites, sat with the Sanhedrin in the Temple. Jethro and Amalek were consulted by Pharaoh, and that both advised him to throw the male children into the river; but, seeing that Amalek was excluded from both this and the future life, Jethro repented. Some commentators maintain that when Pharaoh asked his advisors about how to go about outsmarting/exterminating Israel, Jethro promptly fled the scene while Job remained silent and Balaam suggested to enslave them.

Joshua ben Levi and Eleazar of Modi'im disagree as to Jethro's position in Midian: according to one, the words kohen Midyan mean that he was the "priest [of] Midian"; according to the other, "prince [of] Midian". Other sources state that Jethro was a priest.

Jethro, having remarked that worshipping an idol was foolish, abandoned it. The Midianites excommunicated him, and none would keep his flocks, so his daughters were compelled to tend them and ill-treated by the shepherds. This, however, conflicts with another statement, to the effect that Jethro gave his daughter Zipporah to Moses on condition that their first son should be brought up in the worship of idols and that Moses swore to respect this condition. However, commentaries explain this away by saying that the purpose of this was that he wanted his grandson to truly appreciate the foolishness of idolatry and that which led Jethro himself to abandon it and that Moses only acceded when he saw through divine inspiration that Jethro would end up releasing him of the vow anyway.

== With Moses and Israel ==
Whether Jethro went to the wilderness before or after the Torah was given, and consequently what it was that induced him to go to the wilderness, are disputed points among the ancient rabbis. According to some, it was the giving of the Torah; according to others, the crossing of the Red Sea dry-shod, or the falling of the manna.

The manner in which Jethro announced his arrival to Moses is also variously described. According to Rabbi Eliezer, Jethro sent a messenger; according to Rabbi Joshua, he wrote a letter and tied it to an arrow which he shot into the camp. Moses did not go out alone to meet his father-in-law; but was accompanied by Aaron, Nadab, Abihu, and the seventy elders of Israel to honor Jethro. Some say that even the Shekinah itself went out to meet him.

The words vayihad Yitro (Exodus 18:9), generally translated "and Jethro rejoiced," are interpreted by the Talmudists as "he circumcised himself"; or "he felt a stinging in his flesh"; that is to say, he was sorry for the loss of the Egyptians, his former coreligionists. By an interchange of the ח with the ה, the phrase would read vayihad, meaning "he became a Jew".

Jethro was the first to utter a benediction to God for the wonders performed by Him for the Israelites (Exodus 18:10); such a thing had not been done either by Moses or by any of the Israelites. Jethro knew that God was greater than all the gods (Exodus 18:11), because he had previously worshiped all the idols of the world; but at the same time he did not deny to idols all divine power. According to Rabbi Joshua, Moses purposely sent Jethro away so he would not be present at the revelation of the Law.

== See also ==
- Shuaib
