= Gershom (disambiguation) =

Gershom is a Hebrew given name, and was the firstborn son of Moses.

Gershom may also refer to:

- Gershom ben Judah (c. 960 -1040? -1028?), Rabbeinu Gershom
- Gershom Browne (1898–2000)
- Gershom Bulkeley (1636–1721), Christian minister and physician
- Gershom Carmichael (1672–1729), Church of Scotland minister
- Gershom Cox (1863–1918), English footballer
- Gershom Bassey (born 1962), Nigerian politician and businessman
- Gershom Gorenberg, American-born Israeli journalist, and blogger
- Gershom Whitfield Guinness (1869–1927), Protestant missionary, doctor, and writer
- Gershom Mott (1822–1884), United States Army officer and General in the Union Army
- Gershom Powers (1789–1831), American politician
- Gershom Schocken (1912–1990), Israeli journalist and politician
- Gershom Scholem (1897–1982), German-born Israeli philosopher and historian
- Gershom Mendes Seixas (1745–1816)
- Gershom Sizomu (born 1972), Ugandan rabbi
- Gershom Stewart (1857–1929)
- Gershom Bradford Weston (1799–1869)
- William Gershom Collingwood (1854–1932), English author and artist
- Yonassan Gershom (born 1947), Rabbi and writer

== See also ==
- Gershon (disambiguation)
- Gerson (disambiguation)
