= Temptations of Christ (Botticelli) =

Fresco by Sandro Botticelli

The Temptations of Christ
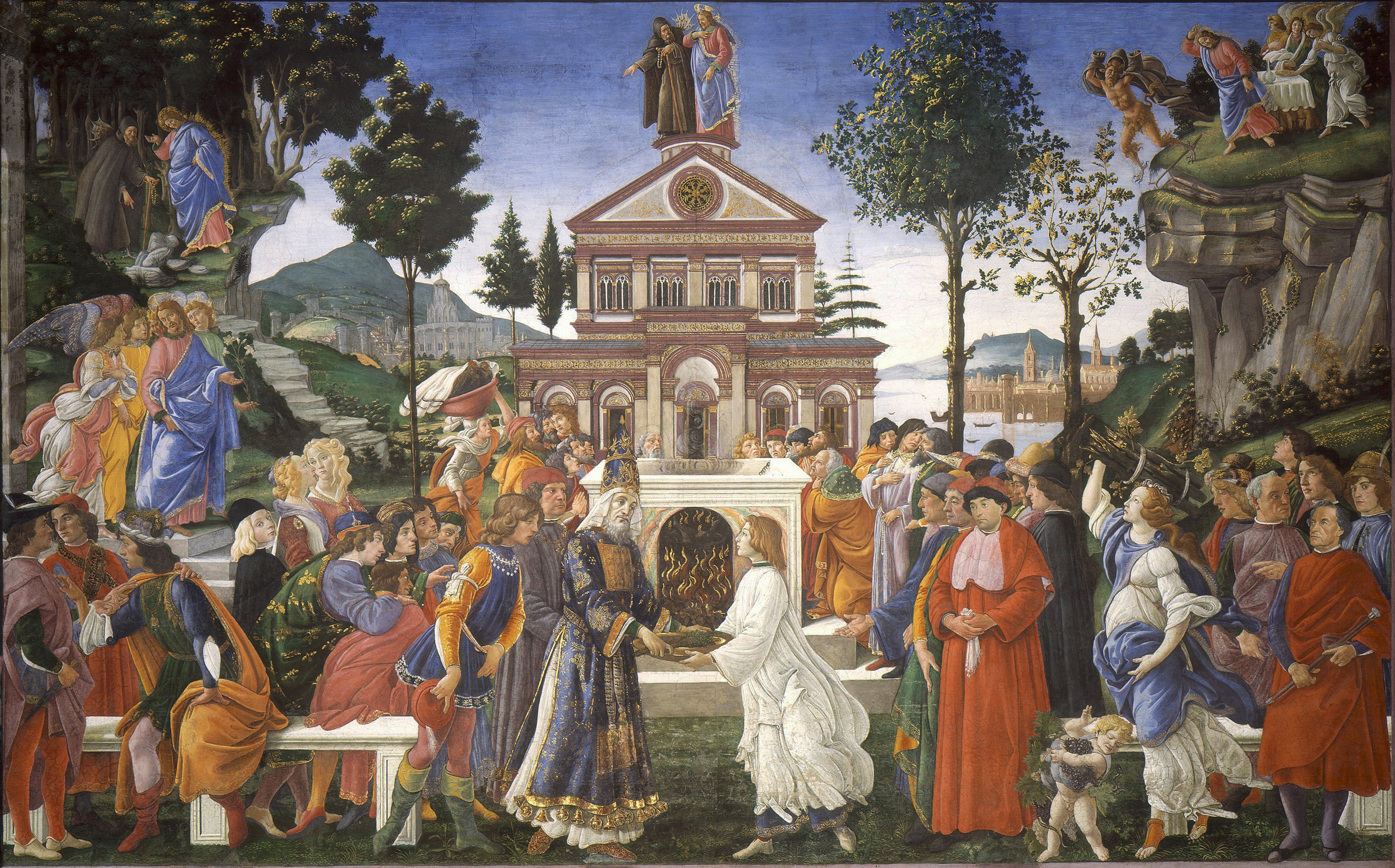
- Artist: Sandro Botticelli
- Year: 1480–1482
- Type: Fresco
- Dimensions: 345.5 cm × 555 cm (136.0 in × 219 in)
- Location: Sistine Chapel; Rome

The Temptations of Christ is a fresco by the Italian Renaissance painter Sandro Botticelli, executed in 1480–1482 and located in the Sistine Chapel, Rome.

== History ==
On 27 October 1480 Botticelli, together with other Florentine painters, Domenico Ghirlandaio and Cosimo Rosselli, left for Rome, where he had been called as part of the reconciliation project between Lorenzo de' Medici, the de facto ruler of Florence, and Pope Sixtus IV. The Florentines started to work in the Sistine Chapel as early as the Spring of 1481, along with Pietro Perugino, who was already there.

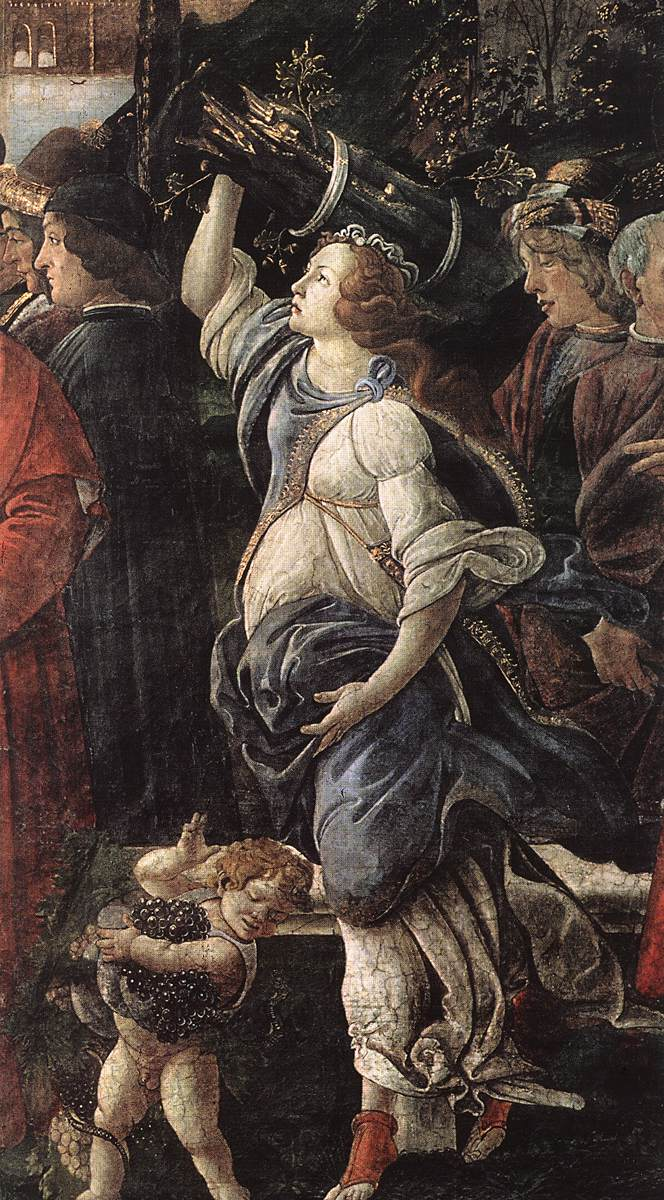
Detail of the fresco

The theme of the decoration was a parallel between the Stories of Moses and those of Christ, as a sign of continuity between the Old and the New Testament. A continuity also between the divine law of the Tables and the message of Jesus, who, in turn, chose Peter (the first bishop of Rome) as his successor: this would finally result in a legitimation of the latter's successors, the popes of Rome.

Botticelli, helped by numerous assistants, painted three scenes. On 17 February 1482 his contract was renovated, including the other scenes to complete the chapel's decoration. However, on 20 February, his father died: he returned to Florence, where he remained.

== Description ==
The Temptations of Christ depicts three episodes from the gospels, in parallel with the painting on the opposite wall, also by Botticelli, showing the Trials of Moses. A frieze, similar to that beneath the other frescos, has the inscription TEMPTATIO IESU CHRISTI LATORIS EVANGELICAE LEGIS ("The Temptations of Christ, Bringer of the Evangelic Law").

The subject of the title takes place in three scenes in the upper section of the fresco. On the left, Jesus, who has been fasting, is tempted by the Devil, in the guise of a hermit, to turn stones into bread. In the second scene of temptation, at the upper centre of the picture, the Devil has carried Jesus to the top of the temple of Jerusalem, represented by the facade of the Chapel of Santa Maria in Traspontina of the Church of Santo Spirito in Sassia in Rome. The Devil tempts Jesus to challenge God's promise that he will be protected by angels, by throwing himself down. In the third temptation, to the upper right, the Devil has taken Jesus to a high mountain where he shows him the beauties of the Earth. The Devil promises Jesus power over this domain, if he will deny God and bow down to the Devil. Jesus sends the Devil away from him, while angels come to minister to him.

In the foreground, a man whom Jesus has healed of leprosy presents himself to the High Priest at the temple, so that he may be pronounced clean. The young man carries a basin of water, in which is a bough of hyssop. A woman brings two fowls for sacrifice and another woman brings cedar wood. These three ingredients were part of the ritual of cleansing of a leper. The high priest may symbolize Moses, who transmitted the Law, and the young man may symbolically represent Christ, who, according to the Gospels, was wounded and slain for the benefit of mankind, and healed through the Resurrection so that mankind might also be made spiritually clean, and receive salvation. In Christian symbolism, many stories, such as the healing of the leper, are perceived to prefigure the crucifixion and resurrection of Jesus, or other events in his life.

== See also ==
- List of works by Sandro Botticelli

== Sources ==
- Santi, Bruno (2001). "Botticelli". I protagonisti dell'arte italiana. Florence: Scala.
