= Hershon =

Hershon is a surname. Notable people with the surname include:

- Goldie Hershon (1941–2020), Canadian activist
- Paul Hershon (1817–1888), Jewish-born Christian scholar and missionary
- Robert Hershon (1936–2021), American poet and writer

== See also ==
- Gershon
- Hershorn
