= Gershuni =

Gershuni is a Jewish patronymic surname meaning "son of Gershon". Notable people with the surname include:

- Grigory Gershuni (1870–1908), Lithuanian revolutionary
- Moshe Gershuni (1936–2017), Israeli painter and sculptor
- Uri Gershuni (born 1970), Israeli photographer and educator
- Vladimir Gershuni (1930–1994), Soviet dissident and poet

== See also ==
- Gerchunoff
- Gershun
