= Lash (surname) =

Lash is a surname. Notable people with the surname include:

- Batton Lash, American comic book creator
- Dominic Lash, English musician
- Don Lash (1912–1994), American long-distance runner
- Israel G. Lash (1810–1878), American politician
- Jennifer Lash (1938–1993), English novelist and painter
- Jim Lash (1951–2019), American football player
- Nicholas Lash (1934–2020), English theologian
- Scott Lash, American professor of sociology and cultural studies
- Stu Lash, American basketball coach and executive
- Tony Lash, American musician and music producer
- Trude Lash (1908–2004), German-American student activist
- William H. Lash (1961–2006), American political officer and professor
- William Quinlan Lash, English bishop
- Mario Hernandez Lash, Mexican football player

== See also ==
- Lasch
