= Gershun =

Gershun is a Russian Jewish surname. Notable people with the surname include:

- Aleksandr Gershun (1868–1915), Russian physicist, optical engineer, founder of the Russian optical industry
- Andrey Gershun (1903–1952), Soviet physicist, expert in photometry and optics
- Denis Gershun, Russian professional football player and coach

== See also ==
- Gershuni
- Gershon
