= Leo Gershoy =

American historian (1897–1975)

Leo Gershoy (September 27, 1897 – March 12, 1975) was a history professor at New York University from 1940 to 1975. In his name the American Historical Association awards an annual prize for the best new book on 17th- or 18th-century European history. An annual lecture at New York University is also named for him.

Gershoy received his B.A., M.A., and PhD from Cornell University. Before New York University, he also taught at Columbia University, Cornell University, his alma mater, University of California, Los Angeles, and the University of Chicago.

== Works ==
Gershoy, Leo (1932). The French Revolution, 1789-1799. International Thomson Publishing. ISBN 978-0-03-082832-4.

Gershoy, Leo (1933). The French Revolution and Napoleon. Appleton-Century.

Gershoy, Leo (1963). From despotism to revolution, 1763-1789. Rise of modern Europe. Harper & Row.

Gershoy, Leo (1979). The Era of the French Revolution, 1789-1799: Ten Years That Shook the World. Rise of modern Europe. Krieger Publishing Company. ISBN 978-0-89874-718-8.
