= Eliezer =

Name shared by multiple Biblical figures

Eliezer (Hebrew: אֱלִיעֶזֶר, romanized: ʾĔliʿezer, lit. 'Help/Court of El') was the name of at least three different individuals in the Hebrew Bible.

== Eliezer of Damascus ==
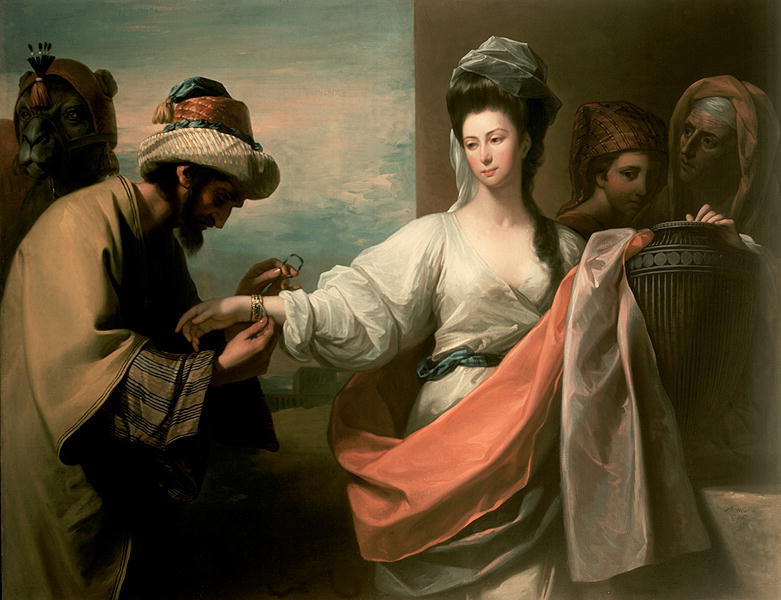
Isaac's servant tying the bracelet on Rebecca's arm by Benjamin West. The servant in question was possibly Eliezer of Damascus.

Eliezer of Damascus (Hebrew: דַּמֶּשֶׂק אֱלִיעֶזֶר, romanized: Damméseq ʾĔliʿezer) was, according to Targum Jonathan Bereishit, 14:14, the son of Nimrod. According to Genesis 15:2, he was the head of the patriarch Abraham's household:

But Abram said, "O lord יהוה, what can You give me, seeing that I shall die childless, and the one in charge of my household is Dammesek Eliezer!"

Medieval biblical exegetes have explained the noun ben mešeq as meaning "butler; steward; overseer", while the name Damméseq Eliʿézer is explained by Targum Onkelos as meaning "Eliezer the Damascene". Other writers say that he was given the name "Damascus" by Abraham, who purchased Eliezer from Nimrod and had passed through the city of Damascus while returning with his servant from Babylonia. Other translations of Genesis describe Eliezer as Abraham's heir.

There is an interpretation in Genesis Rabbah (43:2), cited by Rashi, that Eliezer went alone with Abraham to rescue Lot, about "his initiates" stated to be 318 in number (Genesis 14:14) being the numerical value of Eliezer's name in Hebrew, interpreted in tractate Nedarim (32a) as Abraham not wishing to rely on a miracle by taking only one individual.

According to most interpretations, the unnamed "senior servant of (Abraham's) household, who had charge of all that he owned" in Genesis 24:2, who obtained Rebecca as a bride for Isaac, was the same Eliezer.

== The son of Moses ==
Eliezer was Moses's and Zipporah's second son. His name means "Help of my God". The verse in the Exodus 18:4 states, "[T]he other was named Eliezer, meaning, 'The God of my father’s [house] was my help, delivering me from the sword of Pharaoh.'" Gershom and Eliezer were born after Moses had taken refuge in Midian and married Jethro's daughter Zipporah.

== Eliezer the prophet ==
A prophet called Eliezer, son of Dodavah, rebuked King Jehoshaphat of Judah for aligning himself with King Ahaziah of Israel. Jehosophat and Ahaziah built ships in Ezion-Geber, which were to sail to Tarshish for trade. According to 2 Chronicles 20:37, the ships sank due to his not relying on God:

Eliezer son of Dodavahu of Mareshah prophesied against Jehoshaphat, saying, "Because you have made an alliance with Ahaziah, the LORD will destroy what you have made." The ships were wrecked and were not able to set sail to trade.

== See also ==
- Entering heaven alive – regarding Eliezer, the servant of Abraham.
- Ezra.
- Uzair.
