= Ben Gershon =

Hebrew patronymic

Ben Gershon is a Hebrew patronymic literally meaning "son of Gershon". Notable people with the name include:

- Aaron ben Gershon abu al-Rabi, Sicilian-Jewish scholar, cabalist, and astrologer of the 15th century
- Gersonides (1288–1344), French rabbi also known as Levi ben Gershon
