= Paul Hershon =

Jewish-born Christian scholar and missionary

Paul Isaac Hershon (1817–25 September 1888) was a Jewish-born Christian scholar and missionary.

== Biography ==
Born in Galicia, converting at a young age, Hershon moved to England to promote Christianity and later moved to Jerusalem to oversee works of industry.

On 23 July 1849, he married Minerva Uzielli at the Anglican Church in Jerusalem.

His works include unpublished writings and works, as well as a translation of Jacob ben Isaac of Janowa's rabbinical commentary on Genesis (London, 1885).

Hershon died in Wood Green, London, on 25 September 1888.

== Works ==
- Extracts from the Talmud (London, 1860)
- The Pentateuch according to the Talmud. Part 1. Genesis (London 1878)
- A Talmudic Miscellany; Or a Thousand and One Extracts from the Talmud, the Midrashim, and the Kabbalah (London, 1880)
- Treasures of the Talmud (London, 1882)
- The Pentateuch according to the Talmud. Genesis. With a Talmudical Commentary (London, 1883)
