= Gerson Rosenzweig =

Russian-American editor, author, and poet

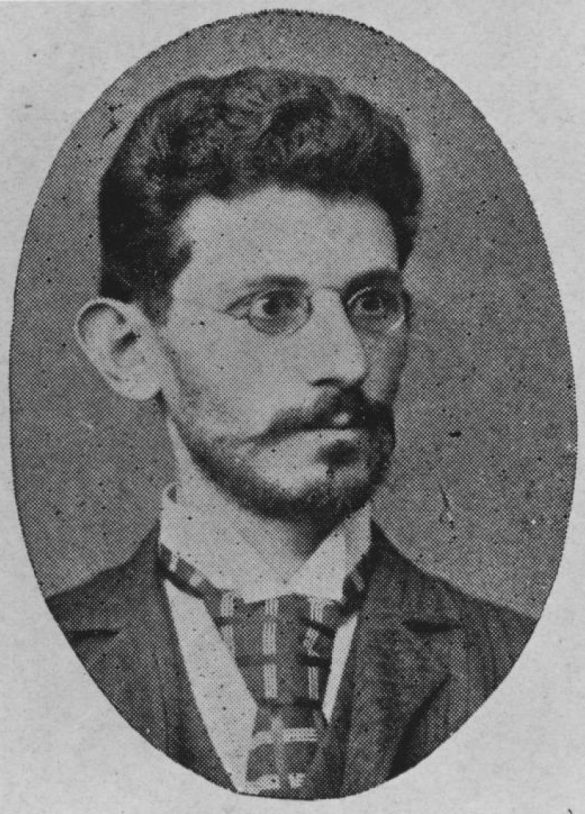
- Born: April 1861; Białystok, Grodno Governorate, Russian Empire
- Died: 14 February 1914 (aged 52); New York City, United States
- Resting place: Bayside Cemetery, Queens
- Occupations: Editor, author, poet
- Spouse: Hannah Abramson
- Writing career
- Language: Hebrew, Yiddish
- Notable work: Masekhet Amerika (1892)

Gerson Rosenzweig (Yiddish: גרשון ראָזענצװייג, romanized: Gershon Rozentsvayg; April 1861 – 14 February 1914) was a Russian-American editor, author, and poet. He is best known for his Hebrew- and Yiddish-language satires, poems, and epigrams.

== Biography ==
Born in Białystok, Rosenzweig received his education in Berlin, Kraków, and other cities of the Russian Empire.

He conducted a Hebrew school in Suwałki, Russian Poland, before emigrating to the United States in 1888. After settling in New York City, Rosenzweig became joint editor of the Yidishes tageblatt ('Jewish Daily News'), Yidishe gazetten ('Jewish Gazette'), and Idishe velt ('Jewish World'), a position he held until 1905. He edited and published a weekly, Ha-Ivri ('The Hebrew'), from 1891 to 1898, a monthly, Kadimah ('Forward'), from 1898 to 1902, and Ha-Devorah from 1911 to 1912. He also contributed to the leading Hebrew and Yiddish papers of his time.

Rosenzweig died on 14 February 1914, after four months at the New York Skin and Cancer Hospital. The funeral, conducted by Rabbi Zvi Hirsch Masliansky, was attended by some 5,000 people. He was survived by his wife, six daughters, and one son.

== Work ==
Rosenzweig's "masterpiece" was Massekhet Amerika, published by A. Ginsberg in New York in 1891 and by the Romm publishing house in Vilna in 1894. It was later included in his 1907 book Talmud Yankaʼi ('The Yankee Talmud'). The popular satire, written in the style of a Talmudic tractate, critiques the social conditions in New York's immigrant Jewish community. Portions of the work were printed in translation in The Sun and other New York papers.

He published several works of poetry. These include Shirim u-meshalim (New York, 1893), a volume of poetry; Ḥamishah ve-elef mikhtamim mekoriyim (New York, 1903), a collection of 1,005 of his Hebrew epigrams and poems; and Mi-zimrat ha-aretz (1898), Hebrew translations of American national songs.

== Partial bibliography ==
- "Lekha dodi". Ha-Tzefira. 14 (72): 4. 12 August 1887.
- Masekhet Amerika [Tractate America]. New York: A. Ginsberg. 1892. hdl:2027/uc1.$b151563.
- Shirim: meshalim u-mikhtamim. Poems.Sefer 1. Vol. 1. New York: S. Levine. 1893. hdl:2027/uc1.aa0012446480.
- Mi-zimrat ha-aretz: American National Songs in Hebrew. New York: s.n. 1898.
- Ḥamishah ve-elef mikhtamim mekoriyim. New York: A. Ḥ. Rosenberg. 1903.
- Talmud Yankaʼi: mekhil be-kirbo shesh mamakhhot [The Yankee Talmud]. New York: A. Ḥ. Rosenberg. 1907.
