= Karen Gerşon Şarhon =

Scholar of Judaeo-Spanish (born 1958)

Karen Gerşon Şarhon (born 1958) is a scholar of Judaeo-Spanish and the coordinator of the Ottoman-Turkish Sephardic Research Center.

== Early life and education ==
Gerşon was born on 25 May 1958 in Istanbul, Turkey to Suzi (Sultana) and Beni (Baruh) Gerşon, who were Ladino-speaking Sephardic Jews, whose ancestors came to the Ottoman Empire after the expulsion of Jews from Spain in 1492. Although her parents spoke Ladino at home, they had studied in the French schools of Istanbul and instead chose to speak to her in French, which caused her to initially not be fluent in her ancestral language. She first started learning Turkish in elementary school and continued her French studies through a private tutor following the third grade. She was introduced to the English language when she joined the English High School for Girls in her hometown. Studying there for five years (including two preparatory years learning English), she then went to Robert College and in 1976 entered Boğaziçi University, majoring in English Philology and Linguistics.

Gerşon is currently the coordinator of the Istanbul-based Sephardic Centre of Istanbul, which was established in 2003 to promote Sephardic culture and the Ladino language in Turkey and abroad. Gerşon is also the editor-in-chief of El Amaneser, the monthly Ladino-language supplement of the Turkish Jewish newspaper Şalom. El Amaneser has been published continually since it was originally launched in 2003.

== Personal life ==
In 1992, she married Jozi Yusuf Şarhon and had her daughter, Selin Şarhon, in 1996.

== Works ==
- "Ladino in Turkey: The Situation Today as Reflected by the Ladino Database Project" European Judaism, 44: Issue 1 (2011): 62–71
- "Judeo-Spanish: Where We Are, And Where We Are Going" International Sephardic Journal 1, no. 1 (2004): 74-78
- "Culture and Music of the Jews of Turkey" Jewish Renaissance Magazine 9, no. 2 (2010)

== Discography ==
- Los Pasharos Sefaradis Vol. I (1987)
- Los Pasharos Sefaradis Vol. II (1987)
- Los Pasharos Sefaradis Vol. III (1987)
- La Romansa de Rika Kuriel (1988)
- Kantikas Para Syempre (1995)
- Zemirot: Turkish-Sephardic Synagogue Hymns (2002)
- Kantikas Para Syempre, 2nd edition (2003)
- Las Puertas (2005)
- Tangos Sefaradis del Dip del Baul (2017)
