= Zipporah =

Wife of Moses

- צִפּוֹרָה
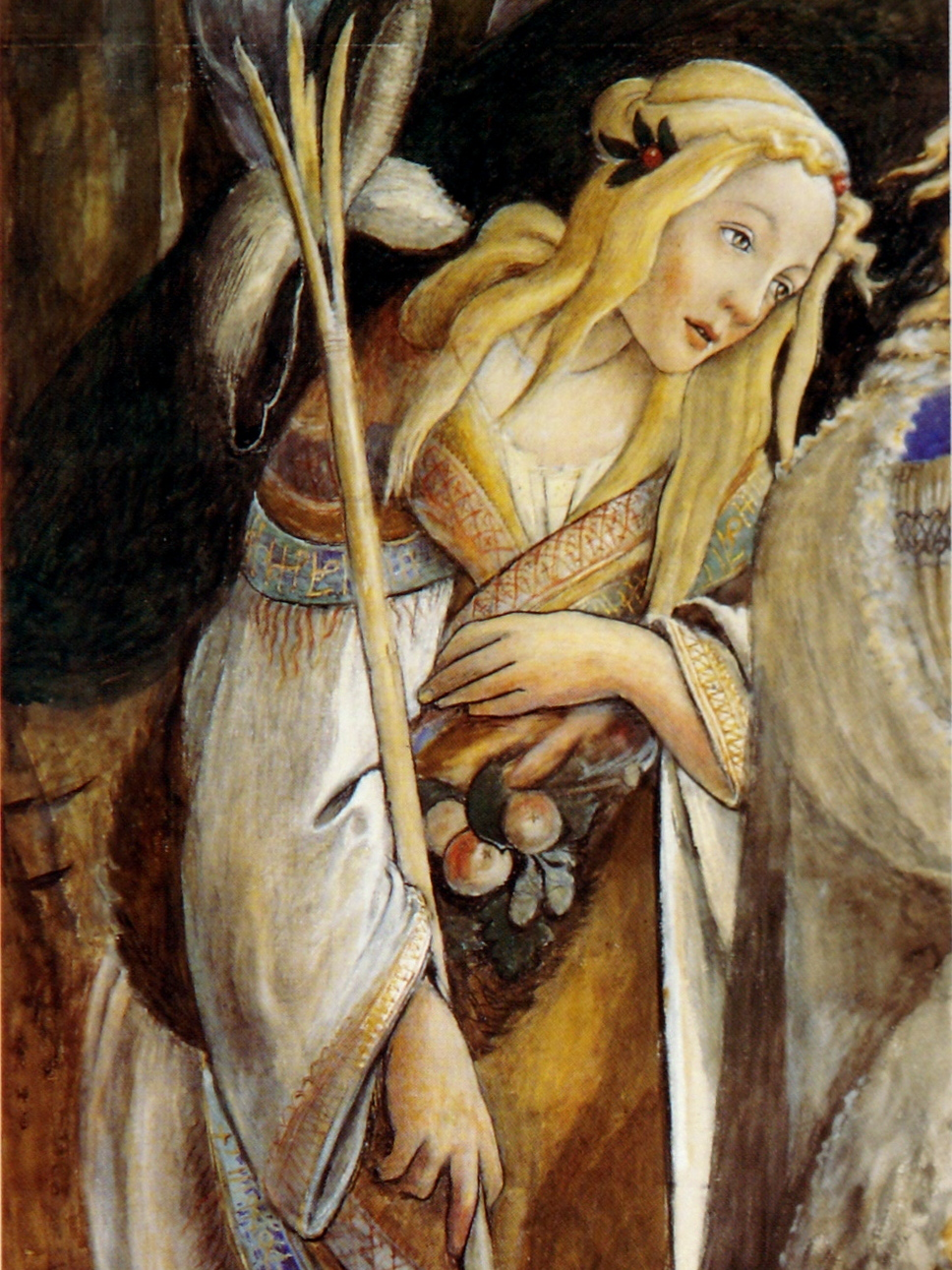
- Zipporah by John Ruskin after Botticelli, 1874
- Born: Region of Midian
- Died: Unknown
- Known for: Being the wife of Moses
- Spouse: Moses
- Children: Gershom (son); Eliezer (son)
- Parent: Jethro
- Relatives: Six sisters Aaron (brother-in-law); Miriam (sister-in-law)

Zipporah (Note: /ˈzɪpərə, zɪˈpɔːrə/; Hebrew: צִפּוֹרָה, romanized: Ṣīppōrā, lit. 'bird'; Greek: Σεπφώρα, romanized: Sepphōra; Arabic: صفورة, romanized: Ṣaffūrah; also anglicized as Sephora, Tzipora, Tziporah,Tzipporah, Zipora, Ziporah, Zippora) is mentioned in the Book of Exodus as the wife of Moses, and the daughter of Jethro, the priest and prince of Midian.

She is the mother of Moses' two sons: Eliezer and Gershom.

In the Book of Chronicles, two of her grandsons are mentioned: Shebuel, son of Gershom; and Rehabiah, son of Eliezer.

== Biblical narrative ==
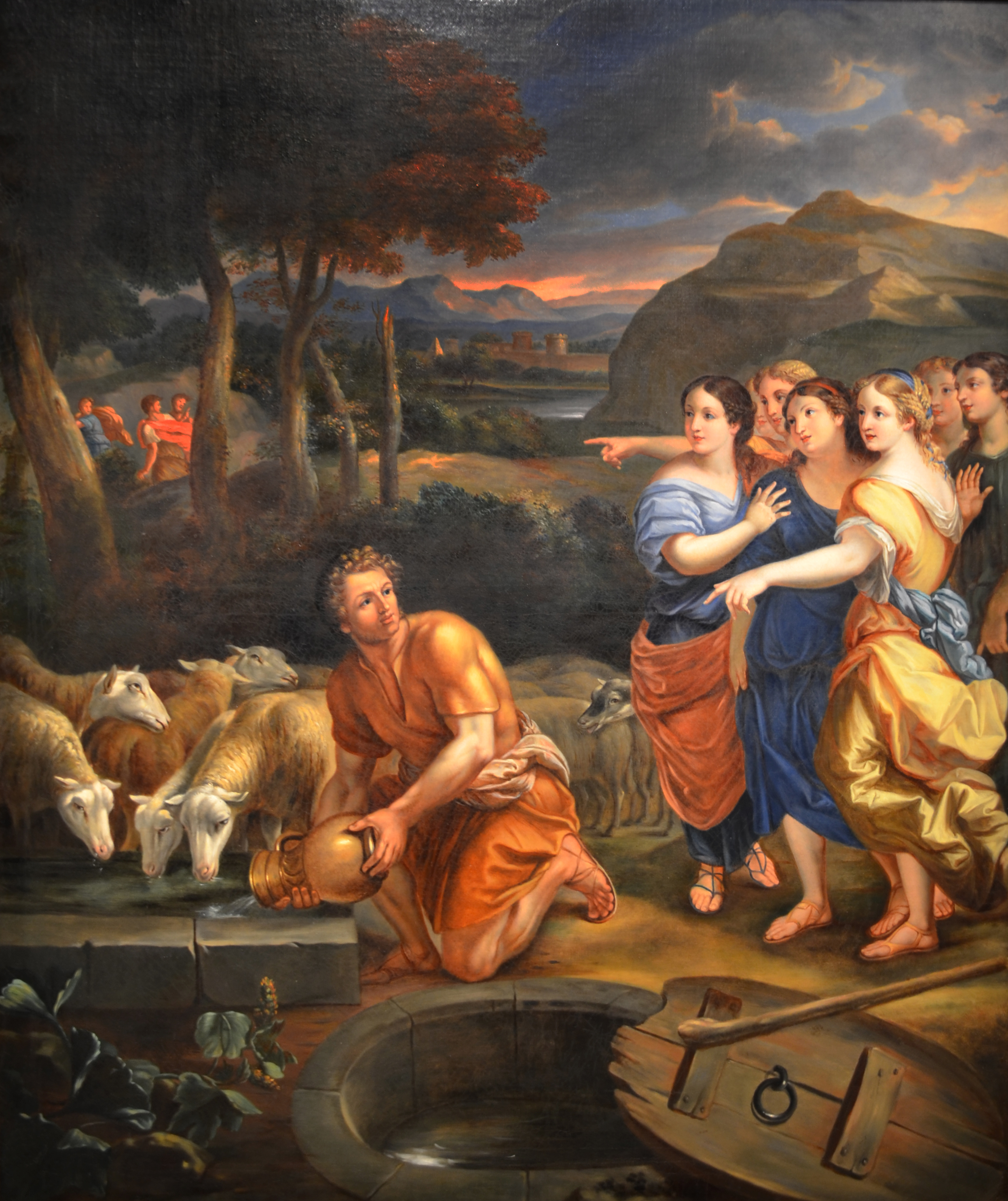
The Daughters of Jethro, Théophile Hamel, c. 1850

=== Background ===
In the Book of Exodus, Zipporah was one of the seven daughters of Jethro, a Kenite shepherd who was a priest of Midian. In Exodus 2:18, Jethro is also referred to as Reuel, and in the Book of Judges (Judges 4:11) as Hobab. Hobab is also the name of Jethro's son in Numbers 10:29.

=== Moses marries Zipporah ===
While the Israelites/Hebrews were captives in Egypt, Moses killed an Egyptian who was striking a Hebrew, for which offense Pharaoh sought to kill Moses. Moses therefore fled from Egypt and arrived in Midian. One day while he sat by a well, Jethro's daughters came to water their father's flocks. Other shepherds arrived and drove the girls away, so that they could water their own flocks first. Moses defended the girls and watered their flocks. Upon their return home, their father asked them, "How is it that you have come home so early today?" The girls answered, "An Egyptian rescued us from the shepherds; he even drew water for us and watered the flock." "Where is he then?", Jethro asked them. "Why did you leave the man? Invite him for supper to break bread." Jethro then gave Moses Zipporah as his wife (Exodus 2:11–21).

=== Incident at the inn ===
After God commanded Moses to return to Egypt to free the Israelites, Moses took his wife and sons and started his journey. On the road, they stayed at an inn, where God came to kill Moses. Zipporah quickly circumcised her son with a sharp stone and touched Moses' feet with the foreskin, saying "Surely you are a husband of blood to me!" God then left Moses alone (Exodus 4:24–26). The details of the passage are unclear and subject to debate.

=== The Exodus ===
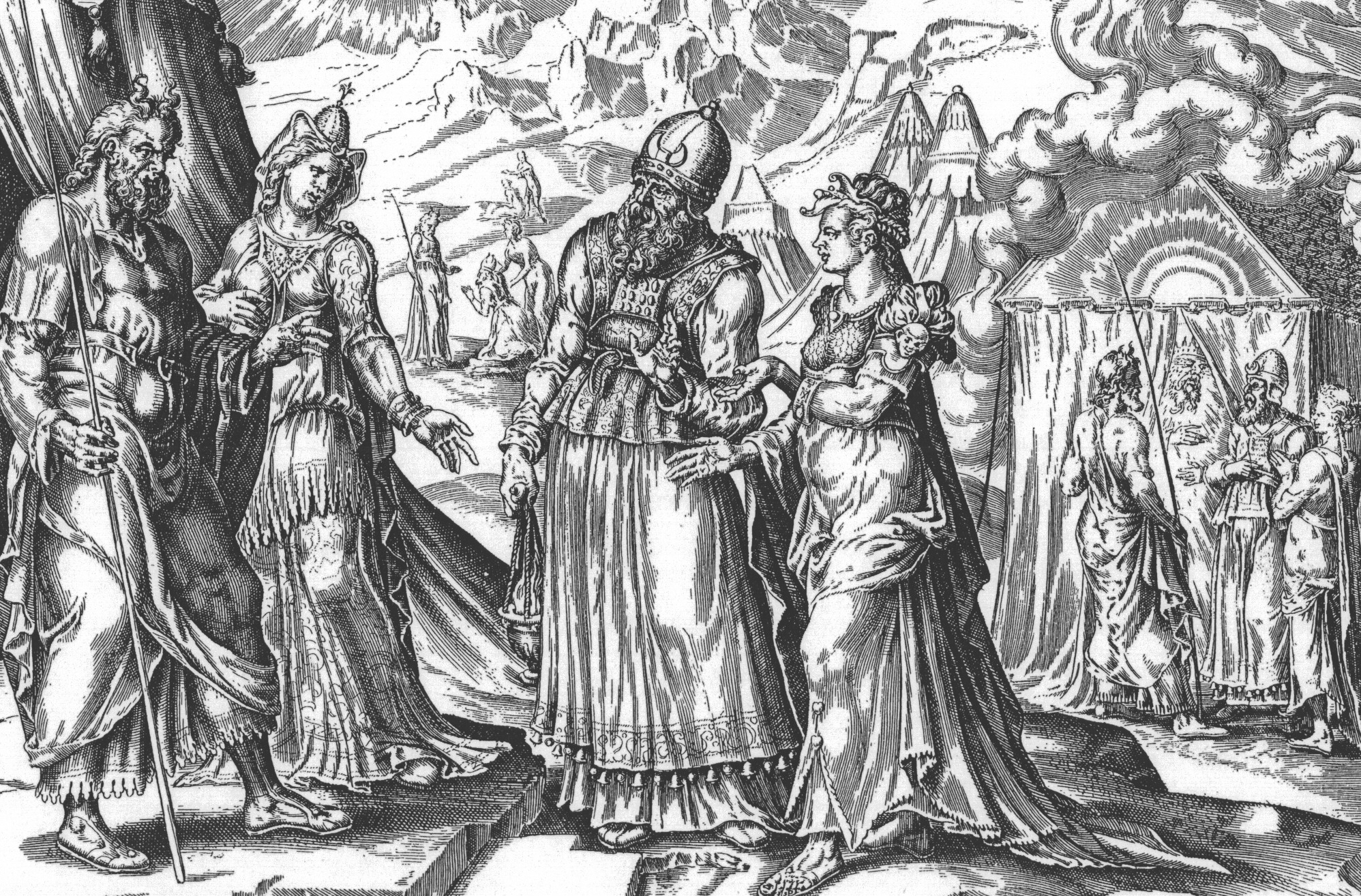
Miriam and Aaron complain against Moses, illustration from The Bible and Its Story, Taught By One Thousand Picture Lessons (1908)

After Moses succeeded in leading the Israelites out of Egypt, and won a battle against Amalek, Jethro came to the Hebrew camp in the wilderness of Sinai, bringing with him Zipporah and their two sons, Gershom and Eliezer. The Bible does not say when Zipporah and her sons rejoined Jethro, only that after he heard of what God did for the Israelites, he brought Moses' family to him. The most common translation is that Moses sent her away, but another grammatically permissible translation is that she sent things or persons, perhaps the announcement of the victory over Amalek. The word that makes this difficult is shelucheiha, the sendings [away] of her (Ex. 18:2).

==== Numbers 12 ====
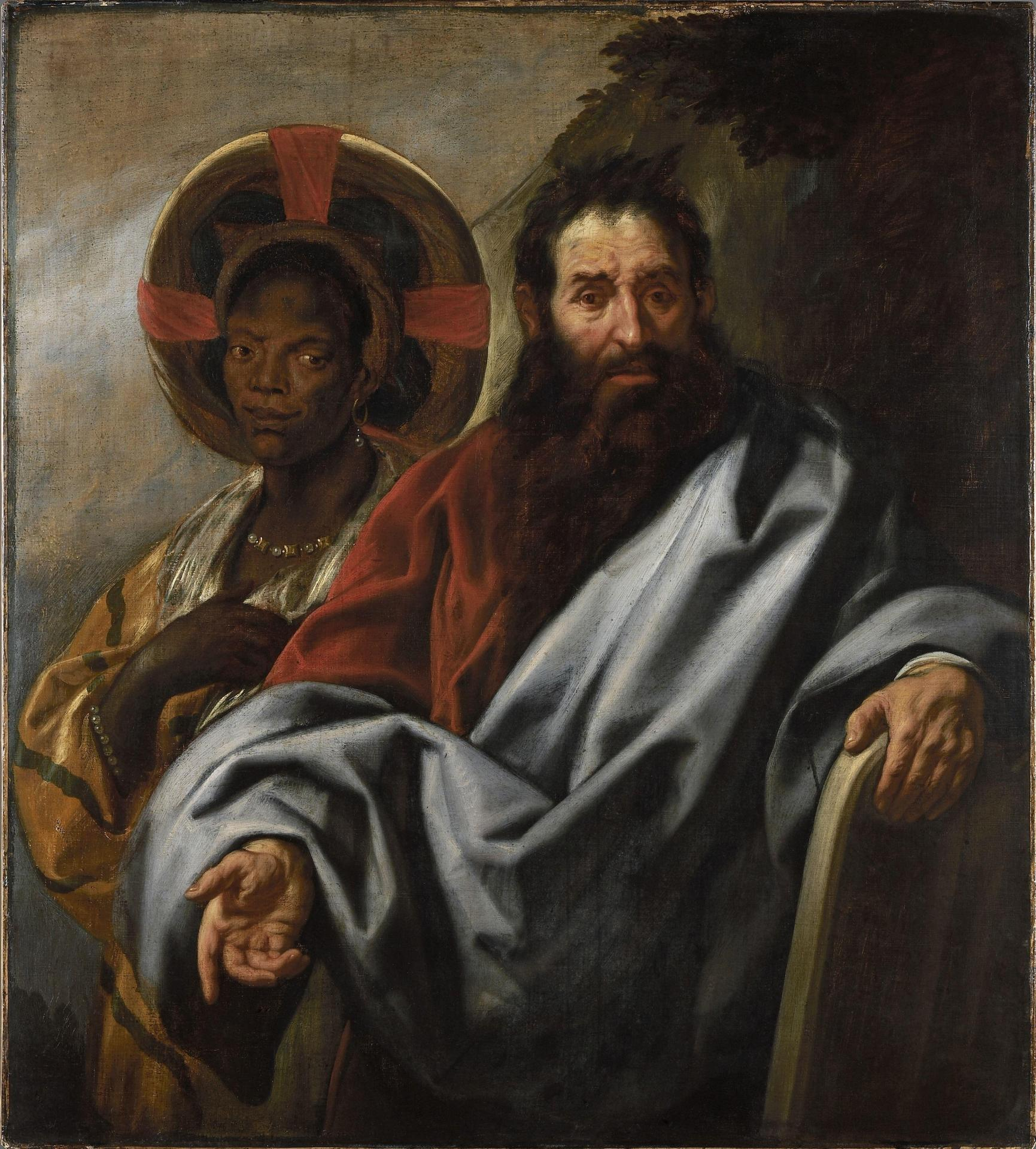
Moses and his Ethiopian wife Zipporah (Mozes en zijn Ethiopische vrouw Sippora). Jacob Jordaens, c. 1650

Moses' wife is referred to as a "Cushite woman" in Numbers 12. Interpretations differ on whether this Cushite woman was one and the same as Zipporah, or another woman, and whether he was married to them simultaneously, or successively. In the story, Aaron and Miriam criticize Moses' marriage to a Cushite woman. This criticism displeases God, who punishes Miriam with tzaraath (often glossed as leprosy). Cushites were of the ancestry of either Kush (Nubia) in northeast Africa, or Arabians. The sons of Ham, mentioned within the Book of Genesis, have been identified with nations in Africa (Ethiopia, Egypt, Libya), the Levant (Canaan), and Arabia. The Midianites themselves were later depicted at times in non-Biblical sources as dark-skinned and called Kushim, a Hebrew word used for dark-skinned Africans. One interpretation is that the wife is Zipporah, and that she was referred to as a Cushite though she was a Midianite, because of her beauty.

The text of Numbers preserves only consonants. Jewish reading traditions pronounce the description of Moses's wife as "kushit" meaning "the Cushite woman". However, the oral reading tradition of the Samaritan Pentateuch pronounces the description of Moses's wife as "kaashet," which translates to "the beautiful woman."

"Cushite woman" becomes Αἰθιόπισσα in the Greek Septuagint (3rd century BCE) and Aethiopissa in the Latin Vulgate Bible version (4th century). Alonso de Sandoval, 17th century Jesuit, reasoned that Zipporah and the Cushite woman was the same person, and that she was black. He puts her in a group of what he calls "notable and sainted Ethiopians".

== In Islam ==
In Islamic tradition, the narrative of Safura (Zipporah)—commonly referred to as the wife of Moses—is derived from the Quran, primarily within Surah Al-Qasas. According to the Quranic account, after Moses arrived in Midian, he encountered two women who were unable to water their flocks because of the men present at the well. Moses assisted them by watering their livestock.

Upon returning home early, the women informed their father of the stranger's kindness. The father sent one of his daughters to invite Moses to his home to reward him for his help. Moses accepted the invitation and shared his story with the father, who reassured him, saying, "Fear not; you have escaped from the wrongdoing people."

The identity of the father is a subject of scholarly discussion. While many classical scholars, based on popular tradition, identified him as the prophet Shuaib, other scholars argue that he was a righteous man of Shuaib's people, noting the significant historical gap between the two prophets.

The father, impressed by his daughter's observation of Moses's character, proposed that Moses marry one of his daughters in exchange for serving him for eight or ten years. Moses accepted the proposal, and the marriage was concluded. Islamic tradition identifies the daughter who became Moses's wife as "Safura" (Zipporah). Moses remained in Midian, fulfilling the agreement. During this time, Safura bore him a son named Gershom.

Islamic scholars often describe Safura as a faithful, patient, and wise woman. She is held in high regard for her role as the daughter and wife of a prophet, and for the counsel she provided to her family. Abdullah ibn Masud, a companion of the Prophet Muhammad, famously cited the insight of Moses's wife, along with the wife of Potiphar and Abu Bakr, as examples of profound human intuition and discernment in Islamic tradition.

== In the Druze religion ==
In the Druze religion, Zipporah's father Jethro is revered as the spiritual founder, chief prophet, and ancestor of all Druze. Moses was allowed to wed Zipporah after helping save Jethro's daughters and their flock from competing herdsmen. It has been expressed by prominent Druze such as Amal Nasser el-Din and Salman Tarif, who was a prominent Druze shaykh, that this makes the Druze related to the Jews through marriage. This view has been used to represent an element of the special relationship between Israeli Jews and Druze.

== In literature and the arts ==
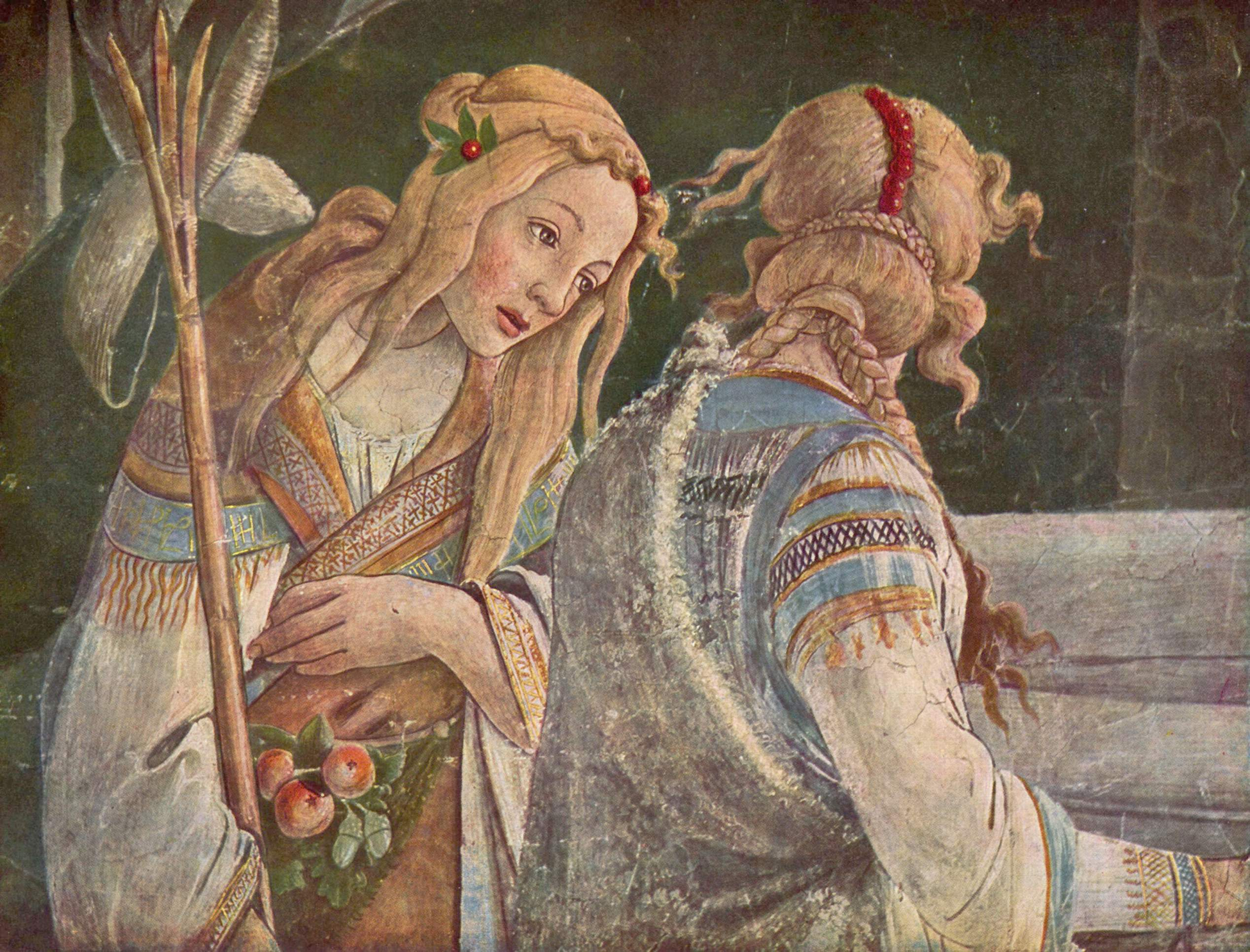
Zipporah, detail from Sandro Botticelli's Youth of Moses, c. 1480

Like many other prominent biblical characters, Zipporah is depicted in several works of art.

In Marcel Proust's story Swann's Way (1913), Swann is struck by the resemblance of his eventual wife Odette to Sandro Botticelli’s painting of Zipporah in a Sistine Chapel fresco, and this recognition is the catalyst for his obsession with her.

Zipporah is often included in Exodus-related drama. Examples include the films The Ten Commandments (1956), The Prince of Egypt (1998), and Exodus: Gods and Kings (2014). She is the main character in Marek Halter's novel Zipporah, Wife of Moses (2005).

== See also ==
- Cushite woman on Hebrew Wikipedia
- Sephora, cosmetics store named after Zipporah
- Tharbis – according to Josephus, a Cushite princess who married Moses prior to his marriage to Zipporah as told in the Book of Exodus
