= Gershon Lasch =

- Born: 1803
- Died: March 3, 1883 (aged 79–80); Halberstadt, Saxony, Kingdom of Prussia

Gershon Lasch (Hebrew: גרשון לש; 1803 - March 3, 1883) was a German educator and writer. In 1823, he was appointed as an instructor at the Jewish school in Halberstadt, Prussia, where he later advanced to the position of professor.

== Selected publications ==
- Zwei Reden, Gehalten zur Gedächtnisfeier und Huldigungsfeier in der Synagoge zu Halberstadt (in German). Halberstadt: C. H. F. Dölle. 1841.
- Geschichte der Israelitischen Schule zu Halberstadt, Dargestellt in Zwei Reden zur Fünfzigjährigen Jubelfeier (in German). Nordhausen: A. Büchting. 1847.
- Piḳḳude Hashem: Die Göttlichen Gesetze aus den Zehn Geboten Entwickelt und in Ihrem Geiste Aufgefasst (in German). Leipzig: H. Hunger. 1857.
- Darkei noam: Leitfaden zur Religionslehre für israelitische Schulen (in German). Leipzig: H. Hunger. 1861.
- Mevin safah: Hilfsbuch zur Präparation beim Uebersetzen der Gebete an Wochen-, Ruhe- und Festtagen für Israelitische Schulen (in German). Halberstadt: H. Meyer. 1863.
- Pirḥe neʻurim ben avne zikaron (in Hebrew and German). Halberstadt: H. Meyer. 1875.
