= Jethro (biblical figure) =

Biblical and Quranic character

- יִתְרוֹ

Personal life
- Children: Seven, including Zipporah
- Relatives: Moses (son-in-law); Gershom (grandson); Eliezer (grandson)

Religious life
- Religion: Abrahamic religions

In the Hebrew Bible, Jethro (Note: /ˈdʒɛθroʊ/; Hebrew: יִתְרוֹ, Modern: Yītrō, Tiberian: Yīṯrō, lit. "His Excellence/Posterity"; Arabic: يثرون, romanized: Yaṯrūn) was Moses's father-in-law, a Kenite shepherd and priest of Midian, sometimes called Reuel (or Raguel). In Exodus, Moses's father-in-law is initially referred to as "Reuel" (Exodus 2:18) but afterwards as "Jethro" (Exodus 3:1). He was also identified as the father of Hobab in Numbers 10:29, though Judges 4:11 identifies him as Hobab.

Druze identify Jethro with the prophet Shuaib, also said to come from Midian. For the Druze, Shuaib is considered the most important prophet, and the ancestor of all Druze.

== In Exodus ==
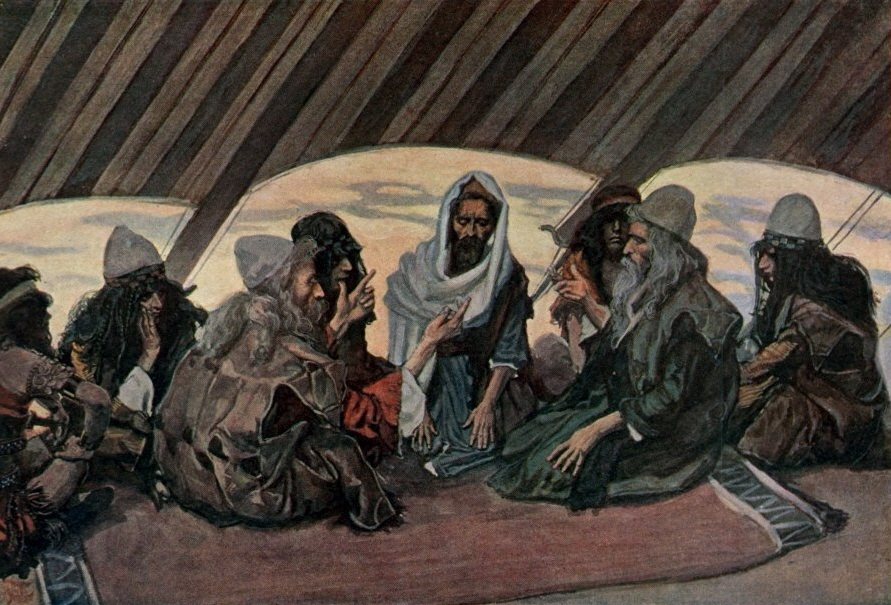
Jethro and Moses (watercolor circa 1900 by James Tissot)

Jethro is called a priest of Midian and became father-in-law of Moses after he gave his daughter, Zipporah, in marriage to Moses. He is introduced in Exodus 2:18.

Jethro is recorded as living in Midian, a territory stretching along the eastern edge of the Gulf of Aqaba, northwestern Arabia. Some believe Midian is within the Sinai Peninsula. Biblical maps from antiquity show Midian on both locations.

Jethro's daughter, Zipporah, became Moses's wife after Moses fled Egypt for killing an Egyptian who was beating an enslaved Hebrew. Having fled to Midian, Moses intervened in a water-access dispute between Jethro's seven daughters and the local shepherds; Jethro consequently invited Moses into his home and offered him hospitality. However, Moses remained conscious that he was a stranger in exile, naming his first son (Jethro's grandson) "Gershom", meaning "stranger there".

Moses is said to have worked as a shepherd for Jethro for 40 years before returning to Egypt to lead the Hebrews to Canaan, the "promised land". After the Battle at Rephidim against the Amalekites, word reached Jethro that under Moses's leadership the Israelites had been delivered out of Egypt, so he set out to meet with Moses. They met in the wilderness at the "Mountain of God"; Moses recounted to Jethro all that had taken place, and then, according to Exodus 18:9–12a:

Jethro rejoiced for all the good which the Lord had done for Israel, whom He had delivered out of the hand of the Egyptians.

And Jethro said, "Blessed be the Lord, who has delivered you out of the hand of the Egyptians and out of the hand of Pharaoh, and who has delivered the people from under the hand of the Egyptians. Now I know that the Lord is greater than all the gods; for in the very thing in which they behaved proudly, He was above them".

Then Jethro, Moses' father-in-law, took a burnt offering and other sacrifices to offer to God.

Following this event, it was Jethro who encouraged Moses to appoint fellows to share the burden of ministering to the Israelites by allowing others to help in judging smaller matters.

These events take place in the Torah portion Yitro (Exodus 18:1–20:23).

== Names ==
There is some disagreement over the name(s) of Moses's father-in-law. When he is first mentioned in Exodus 2:16, his name is Reuel, or Raguel in translations of the Septuagint. In Exodus 3:1, he is called Jethro, and in Exodus 4:18 he is called both Jether and Jethro. In Judges 4:11, a man named Hobab appears as Moses's father-in-law, while Numbers 10:29 calls Hobab "the son of Reuel the Midianite, Moses's father in law", which scholars have considered more likely.

In Jewish tradition, these discrepancies were explained in the belief that the father-in-law of Moses had seven names: "Reuel", "Jether", "Jethro", "Hobab", "Heber", "Keni" (comp. Judges i. 16, iv. 11), and "Putiel"; Eleazar's father-in-law (Ex. vi. 25) being identified with Jethro by interpreting his name either as "he who abandoned idolatry" or as "who fattened calves for the sake of sacrifices to the idol".

According to some modern scholars, "Jethro" was a title meaning "His Excellency", and that "Reuel" was his personal, given name.

== Druze ==
Jethro, Moses's non-Israelite father-in-law, is a central figure, particularly in the rites and pilgrimages, of the Druze religion. He is called Shuaib and viewed as the most important prophet for the Druze.

Nabi Shuʿayb is the site recognized by Druze as the tomb of Shuʿayb. It is located at Hittin in the Lower Galilee and is the holiest shrine and most important pilgrimage site for the Druze. Each year on 25 April, the Druze gather at Nabi Shuʿayb in a holiday known as Ziyarat al-Nabi Shuʿayb to discuss community affairs and commemorate the anniversary of Jethro's death with singing, dancing and feasting. Another Druze shrine in Ein Qiniyye is the supposed burial place of Jethro's sister, Sit Shahwana.

Jethro is revered as the chief prophet in the Druze religion. They believe he was a "hidden" and "true prophet" who communicated directly with God and then passed on that knowledge to Moses, whom they describe as a "recognised" and "revealed prophet." According to Druze belief, Moses was allowed to wed Zipporah, the daughter of Jethro, after helping save his daughters and their flock from competing herdsmen. He is also considered an ancestor of the Druze; as is expressed by such prominent Druze as Amal Nasser el-Din, and according to Salman Tarif, who was a prominent Druze shaykh, this makes the Druze related to the Jews through marriage. This view has been used to represent an element of the special relationship between Israeli Jews and Druze. The Israeli Druze also have a folktale called "Jethro's revenge on the [Sunni Muslim] inhabitants of the village of Hittin."

== See also ==
- Jethro in rabbinic literature
- Moses in rabbinic literature
- Bithiah
- Jethro in Islam
