= The Bagpipe Player =

Painting by Jacob Jordaens

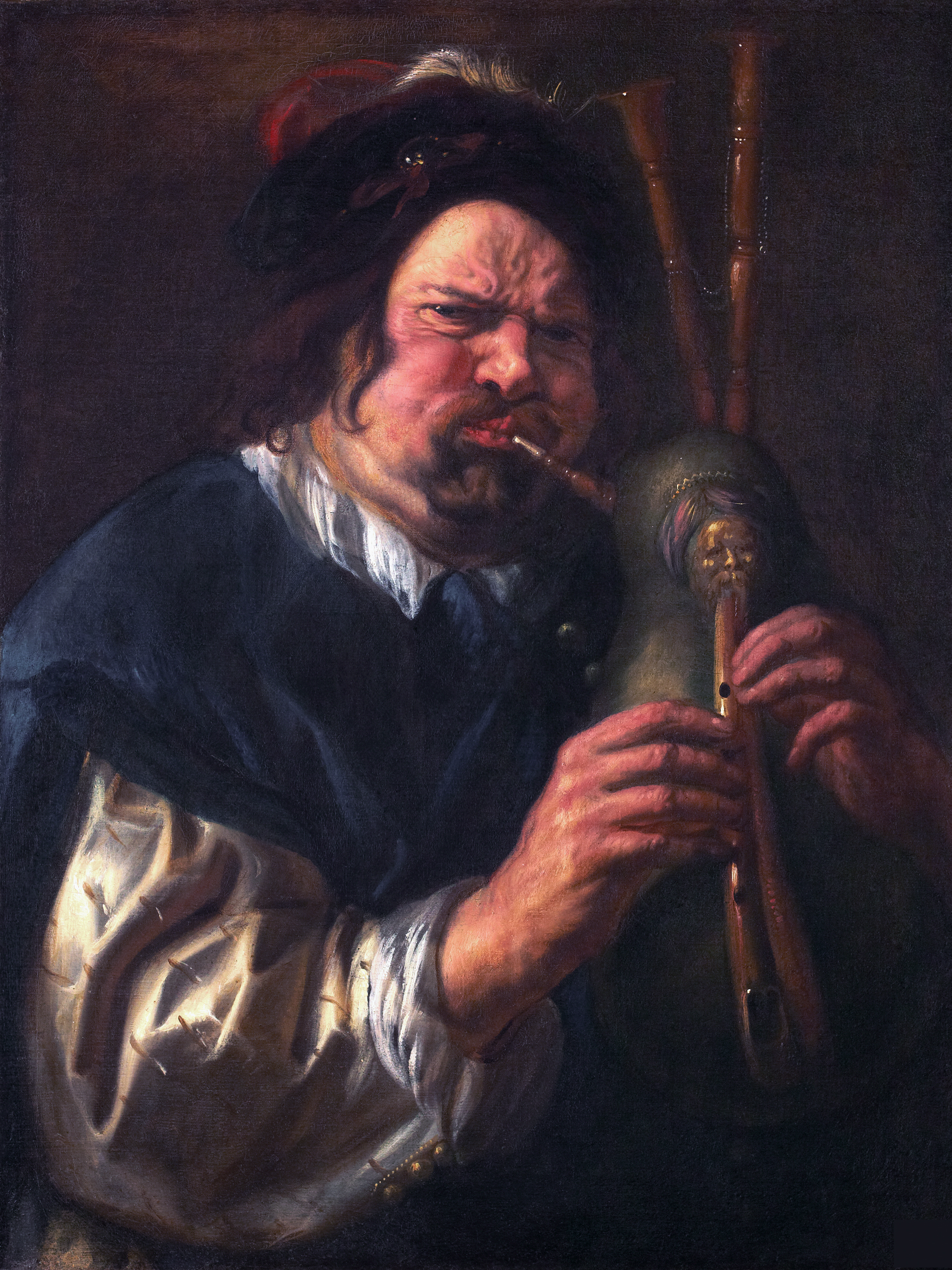
- Artist: Jacob Jordaens
- Year: 1638–1640
- Medium: Oil on canvas
- Movement: Flemish Baroque
- Dimensions: 110 cm × 90 cm (43 in × 35 in)
- Location: Rubenshuis, Antwerp

The Bagpipe Player is an oil painting by the Flemish artist Jacob Jordaens depicting the artist himself dressed as a musician blowing a bagpipe. It was bought in London in 2009 for 93,000 Euros by the King Baudouin Foundation with funds from the Léon Courtin-Marcelle Bouché Foundation, which also financed its restoration. It is now on display in the Rubenshuis in Antwerp.

== Subject ==
The Bagpipe Player was painted 'after life' and is dated to the period of 1638–1640 or 1640–1645 depending on the sources. It is executed in oil on canvas and measures 90 x 110 cm.

Jacob Jordaens sat himself as the model for the painting. Even so, the painting is not regarded as a self-portrait. The precise meaning of the painting has remained unclear. The artist used his own image in a number of other paintings, including the version of As the Old Sing, So the Young Pipe in the Musée des Beaux-Arts in Valenciennes, which dates from a slightly later date than the Bagpipe player. There are at least three more works by the master (or his workshop) in which the artist's own image appears.

As Jordaens was already a successful artist when he painted the work it is not obvious why he depicted himself as a humble player of a bagpipe, an instrument used in popular music. In more formal self-portraits, Jordaens has represented himself with a lute, which in the 17th century was regarded as the noblest musical instrument. Jordaens' depiction of himself as a bagpipe player may be interpreted as a form of self-mockery.
