= Tharbis =

Cushite princess

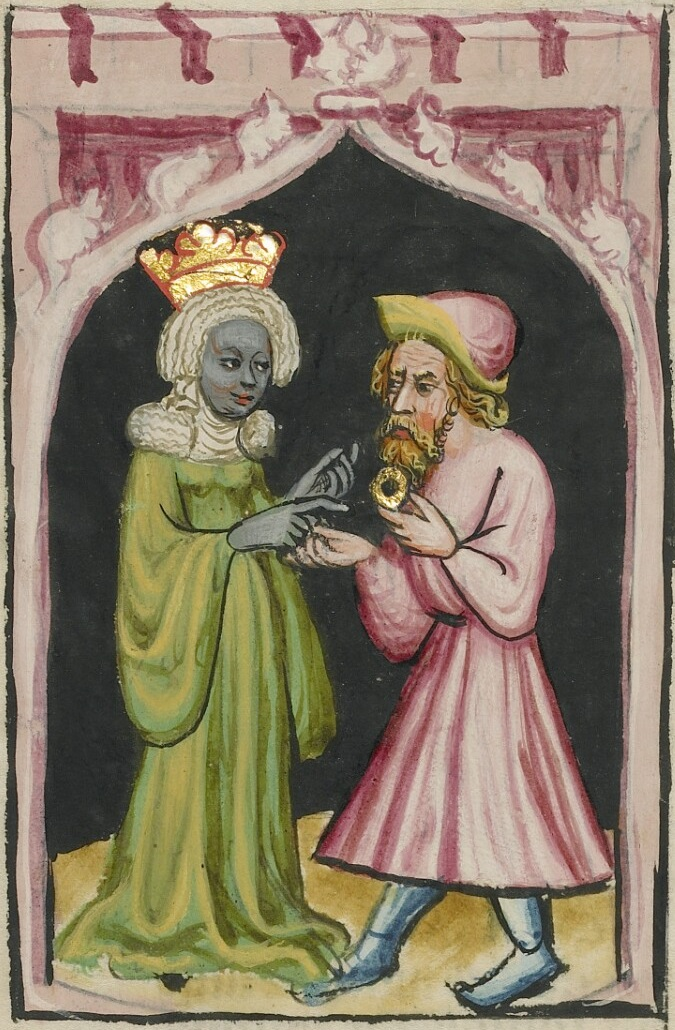
- Moses leaves Tharbis, early 15th century depiction
- Born: Kingdom of Kush
- Spouse(s): Kikianus; Moses

Tharbis (alternatively Adoniah), according to Josephus, was a Cushite princess of the Kingdom of Kush, who married Moses prior to his marriage to Zipporah as told in the Book of Exodus.

== Purported family ==
According to the first-century Romano-Jewish scholar Josephus, Tharbis was the daughter of an unnamed king of "Saba", which he claimed was in Ethiopia, who lived before the Exodus. In the medieval rabbinic version found in the Sefer HaYashar, she is instead the king's wife, not his daughter, and the king is named Kikianus.

== Marriage ==
Per Josephus' account, in Moses' early adult life, he led the Egyptians in a campaign against invading Ethiopians and defeated them. While Moses besieged the city of Meroë, Tharbis watched him lead the Egyptian army from within the city walls, and fell in love with him. He agreed to marry her if she would procure the deliverance of the city into his power. She did so immediately and Moses promptly married her. The account of this expedition is also mentioned by Irenaeus.

After the war, when Moses sought to return to Egypt – Tharbis is said to have resisted and insisted that he remain in Ethiopia as her husband. He then, being "most skilful in astronomy", cast two rings; one which caused the wearer to become forgetful, and the other to cause the wearer to remember all. He gave the first ring to Tharbis, and wore the second himself, and waited for her oblivious nature to lose interest in retaining him as a husband – and when she had forgotten her love for him, he returned to Egypt alone. Some have suggested this period may have started when Moses was 27, and that he remained with Tharbis for forty years; although this number contradicts the traditional sources which suggest that Moses killed an Egyptian overseer when he was approximately 40 years old himself.

== Theories ==
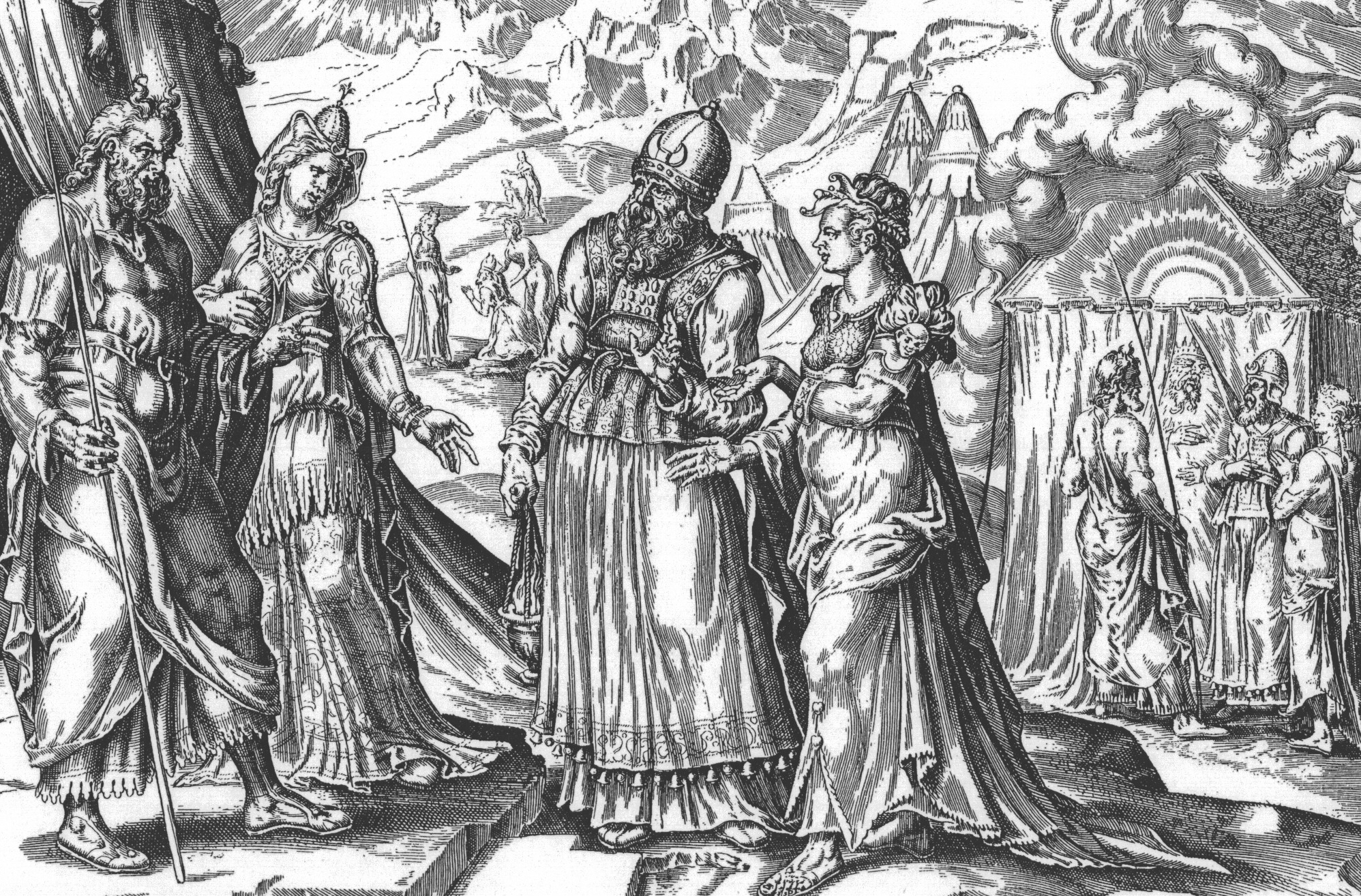
Miriam and Aaron complain against Moses, engraving from 1908

Some have suggested that this story is an invention, arising from the "enigmatic" verse in Numbers 12:1 that states "Miriam and Aaron spoke against Moses because of the Cushite woman whom he had married". Miriam is punished for her rebuke of her brother by being afflicted with leprosy. Moses is depicted with an African wife in a 17th-century painting by Jacob Jordaens.

It is also suggested that Artapanus of Alexandria may have concocted the story "to impress his pagan audience" with "such a love story".

== In fiction ==
Tharbis is a character in "Tarbis of the Lake", a 1934 supernatural story by E. Hoffmann Price. In 1937, Amy Redpath Roddick published an 80-page "poetic drama" telling an account of the life of Tharbis.

Tharbis is portrayed by Esther Brown in Cecil B. DeMille's 1956 biblical epic The Ten Commandments. In the film, she appears briefly and is not Moses's wife.

== See also ==
- Cushite woman on Hebrew Wikipedia
