= Sybil Agrippina =

Painting by Attributed to Abraham Janssens I

The Sibyl Agrippina
- Sibyl Agrippina
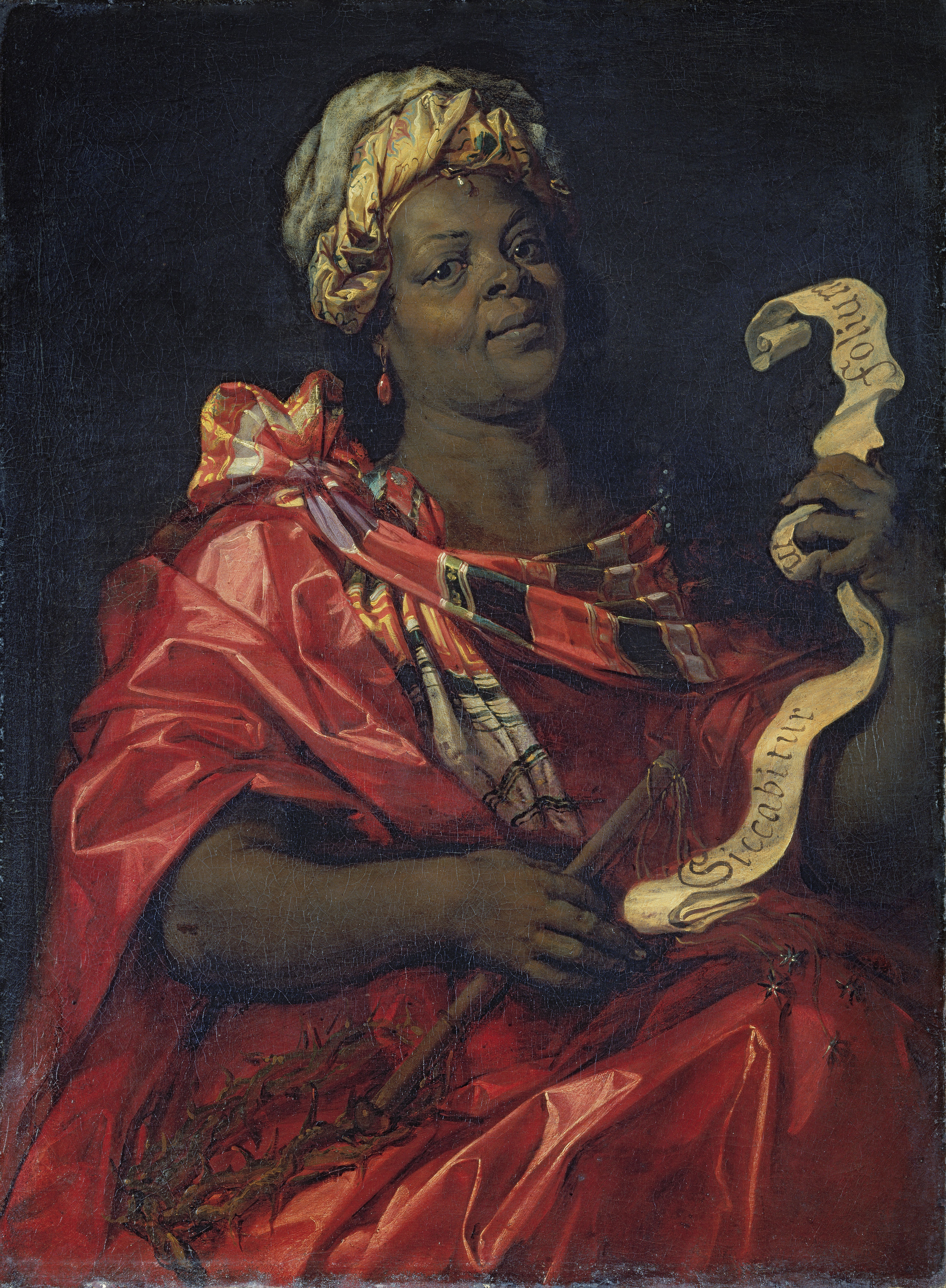
- Artist: Jan van den Hoecke
- Year: c. 1630s
- Dimensions: 1,065 mm (41.9 in) × 800 mm (31 in)

The Sibyl Agrippina is a circa 1630s oil painting of a Black woman in the guise of the Sibyl Agrippina (also known as Sibyl Aegyptia). The painting is one of a series of Sybils by Jan van den Hoecke, only recently being re-attributed after being known as an early portrait of an African woman by Abraham Janssens. It is held in the Museum Kunstpalast in Düsseldorf.

The motif of a Black woman as "Egyptian" Sybil follows the style of various engravings of sybils in Western religious art. The Sybil is shown here with a whip and a crown of thorns, both attributes of Christ's Flagellation. It was given the Jan van den Hoeke attribution in the 2008 exhibition Black is beautiful: Rubens tot Dumas by prof. Elizabeth McGrath. The inscription reads Siccabitur ut folium (he will be shrivelled like a leaf).

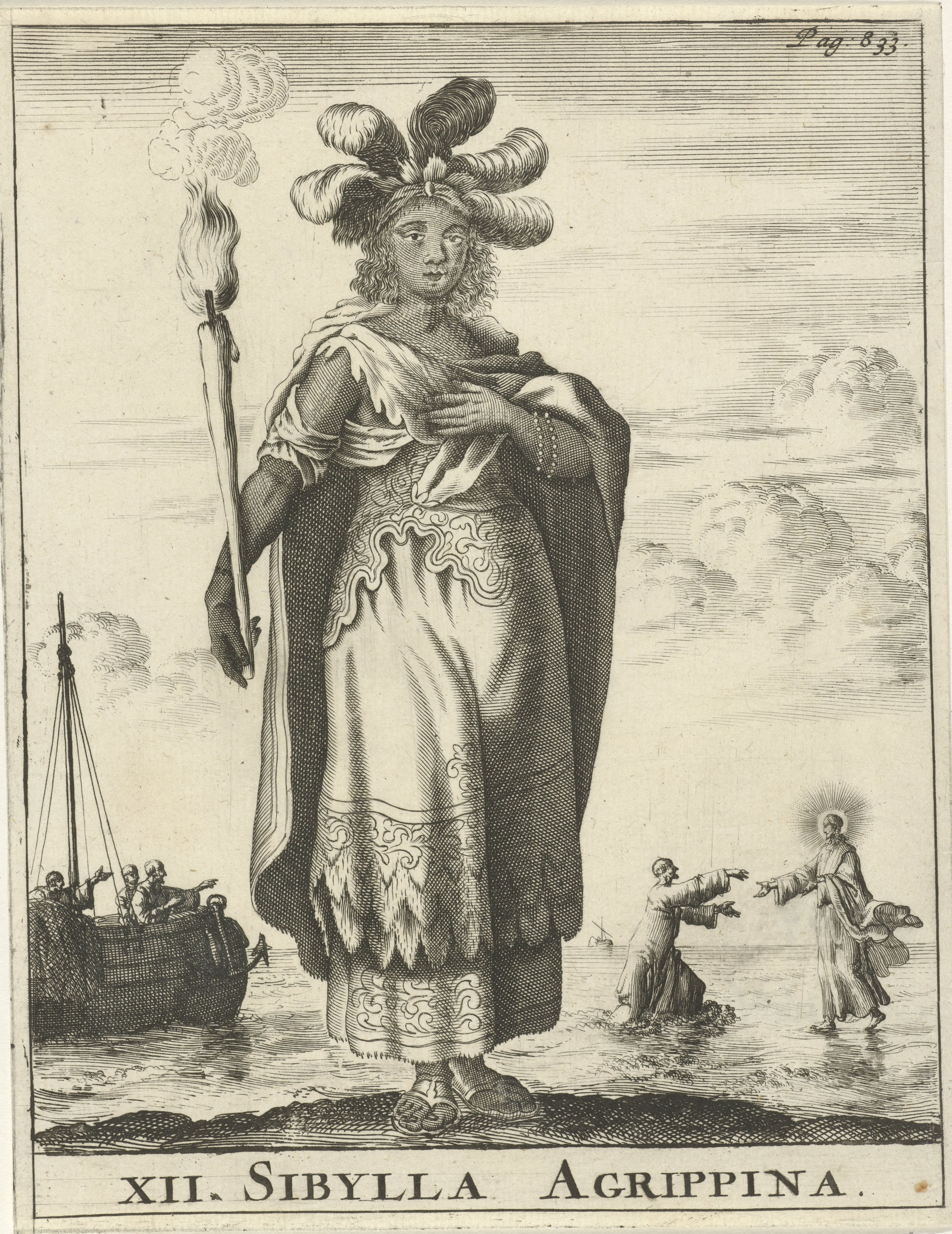
Sybil Agrippina, by Jan Luyken

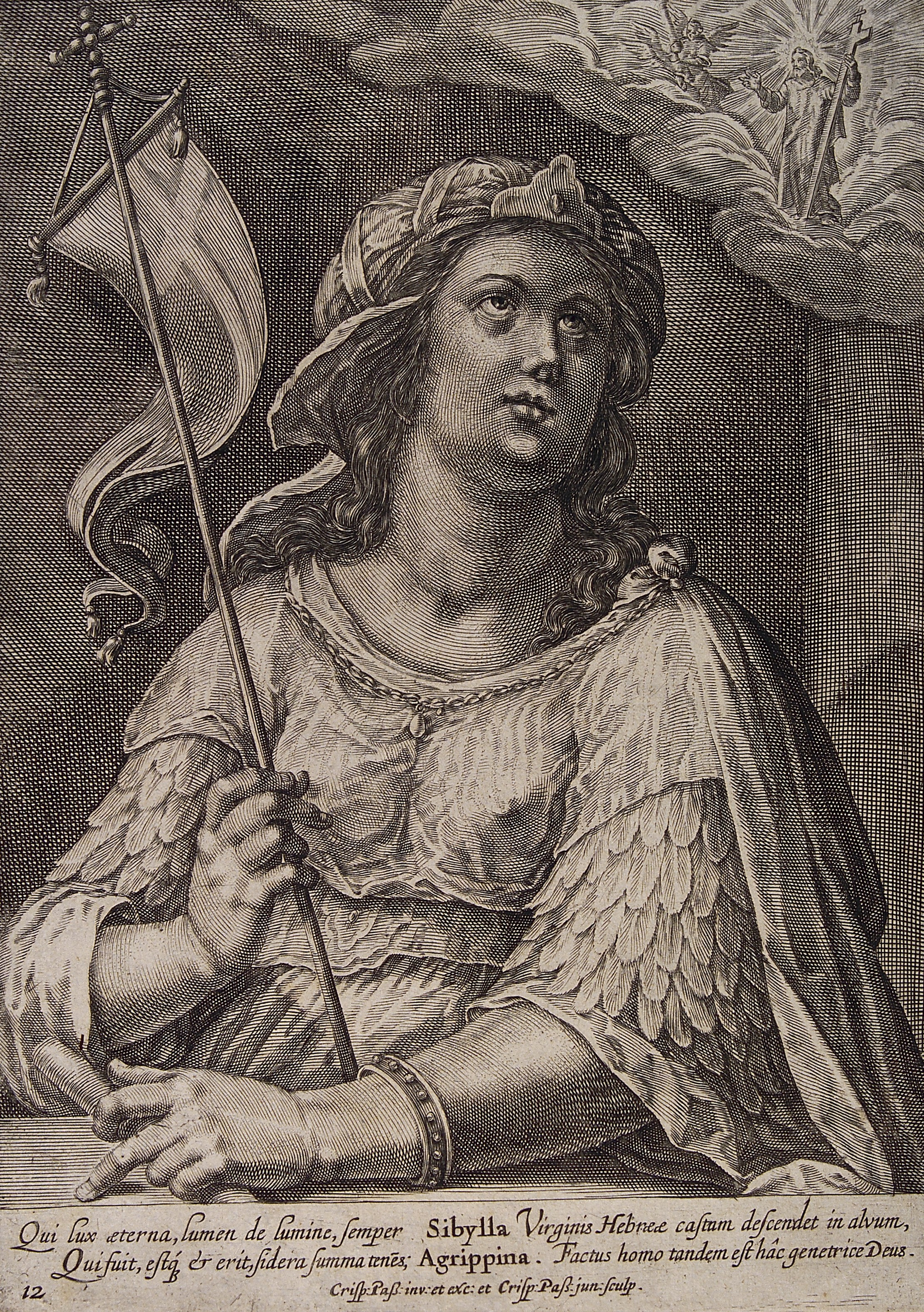
Sybil Agrippina, by Crispijn van de Passe

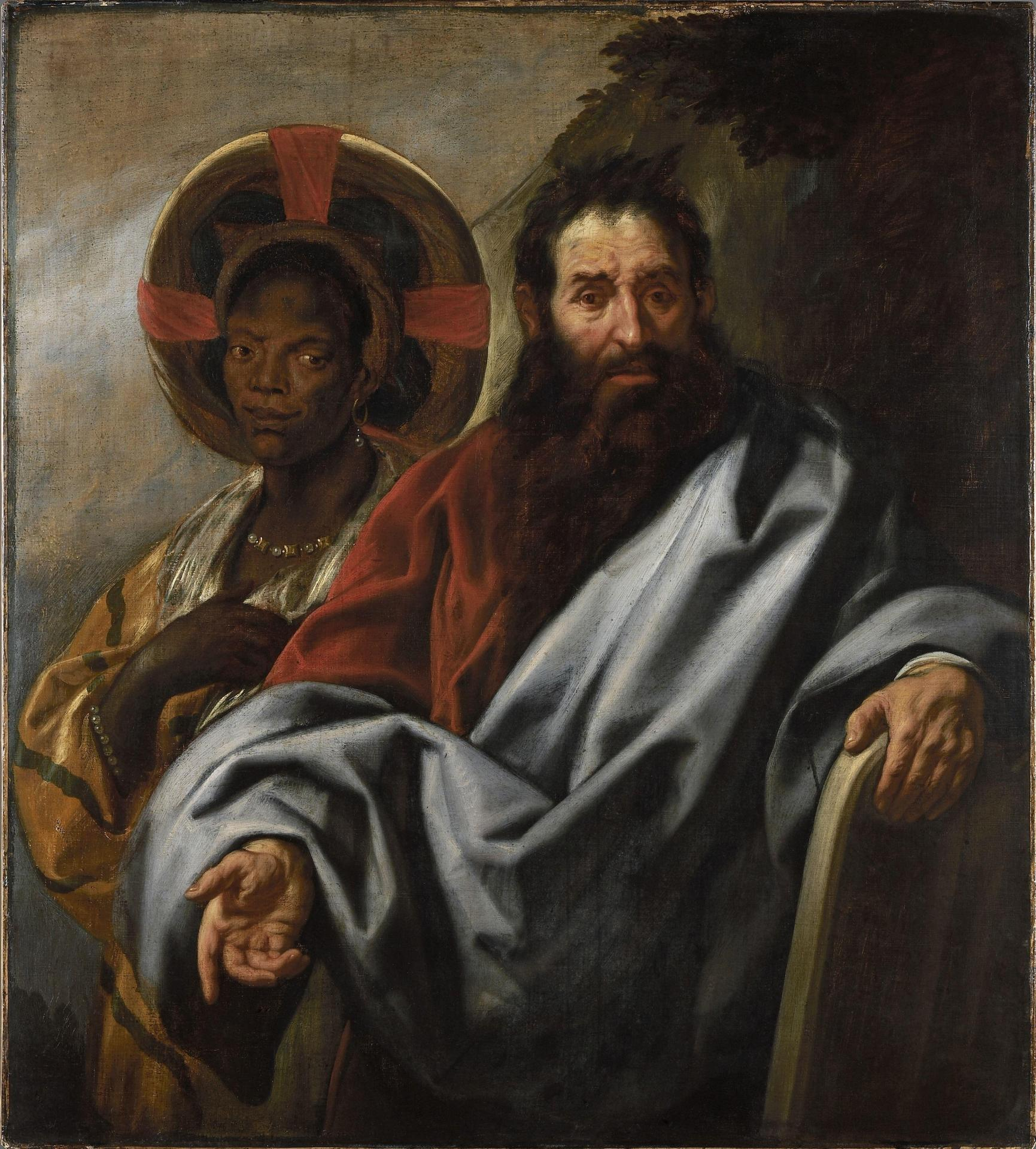
Moses and his Ethiopian wife Zipporah, by Jacob Jordaens
