= Moses and His Ethiopian Wife Zipporah =

Painting by Jacob Jordaens

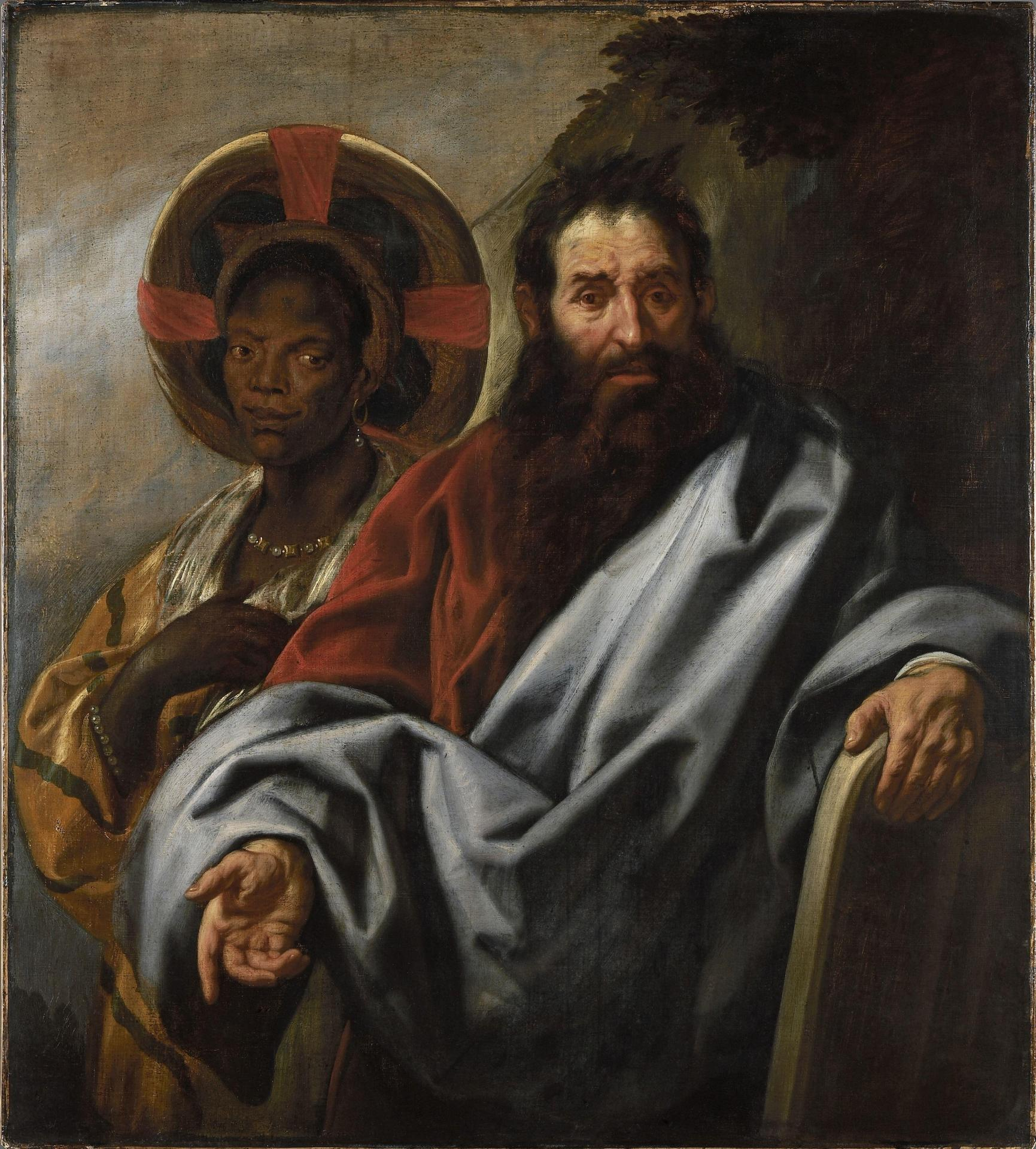
- Artist: Jacob Jordaens
- Year: c. 1645–1650
- Medium: Oil on canvas
- Dimensions: 116.3 cm × 104 cm (45.8 in × 41 in)
- Location: Rubenshuis (normally; closed as of 2025); Antwerp

Moses and His Ethiopian Wife Zipporah (Dutch: Mozes en zijn Ethiopische vrouw Seporah) is a painting in oils on canvas of c. 1645–1650 by the Flemish Baroque painter Jacob Jordaens. The painting is a half-length depiction of the biblical prophet Moses and his African wife. It was received by the Rubenshuis museum in Antwerp, Belgium, in 1951.

== Description ==
Moses stands in the foreground, his right hand palm up and his left hand on the Tablets of Stone. The tablets are in shadow and their contents, the Ten Commandments, are illegible. Behind him to his right stands his wife, a black woman—possibly Zipporah. She holds her right hand to her chest. The ribbons in her hat resemble a cross or cruciform halo.

== Sources ==
Numbers 12:1 states that Moses was criticized by his older siblings for having married a "Cushite woman", Aethiopissa in the Latin Vulgate Bible version. (Note: "Ethiopian woman" in the King James Version and "Cushite wife" in the New International Version.) One interpretation of this verse is that Moses's wife Zipporah, daughter of Reuel/Jethro from Midian, was black. Another interpretation is that Moses married more than once. In Josephus's (first-century) writings and in medieval legend, Moses married Tharbis as his first wife. Jordaens's view is unknown, and the painting has been exhibited under titles without the name Zipporah.

It is likely that Jordaens encountered the tale of Moses's wife in contemporary translations of the Bible and the writings of Josephus. Possibly he had also come into contact with the Jesuit Alonso de Sandoval's works on Africa. Contemporary artists who also included black women in their paintings probably inspired him too, such as Jan van den Hoecke's Sybil Agrippina.

Jordaens is likely to have made the painting not on commission, but for himself or a close friend.

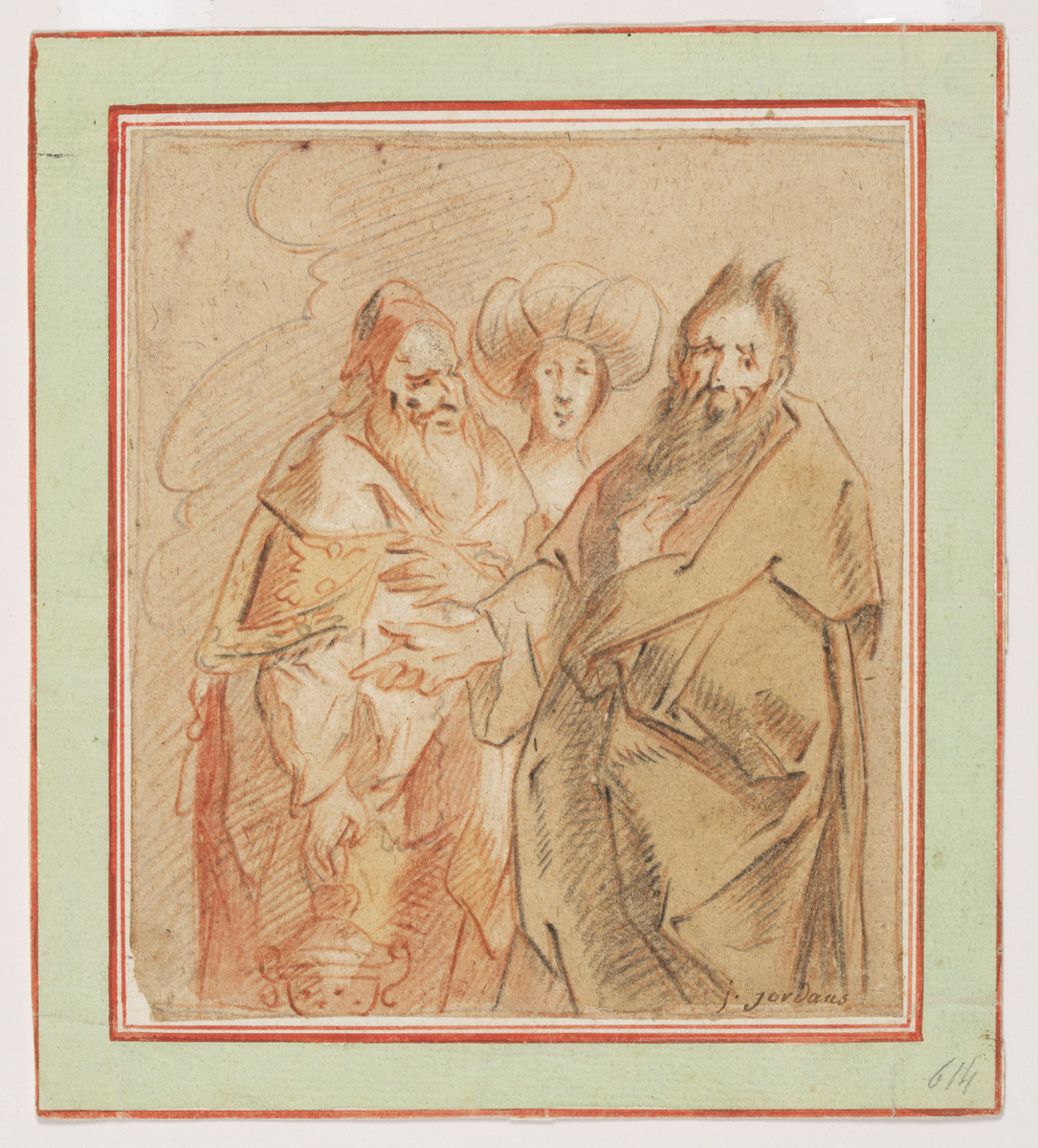
Preliminary study, c 1650

A chalk drawing of c. 1650 by Jordaens, which according to the Rubenshuis is a preliminary study of the painting, depicts three figures: on the right, Moses, distinguished by two horns on his head; on the left, his brother Aaron, portrayed as a high priest wearing priestly vestments and holding a censer; and between them a woman, their sister Miriam.

== Interpretation ==
The art historian Elizabeth McGrath says that

Moses defends his black wife before the viewer, not his brother and sister. It is from the viewer that the Ethiopian woman draws back, questioning, puzzled and perhaps a little fearful. By his brilliant exploitation of the device of inclusion and confrontation, Jordaens gives the subject a pointed relevance, challenging Christians of his day to accept Moses's Ethiopian, as Miriam and Aaron could not, not just as a representative of pagan wisdom, a shadowed image of their own Church, but as a neighbour, in herself.

== Ownership ==
In 1788, the painting was owned by a Mr. Vandergucht. A Mr. Oliver bought it in March 1788. Galerie Fiévez bought it in December 1924. It was in the Van Gelder collection in 1928. Maurice Lagrand bought it in June 1944. The Dorotheum auction house bought it in July 1944 and sold it to Adolf Hitler. The Monuments, Fine Arts & Archives program found it in November 1944. Collection Point München received it in 1948. The Rubenshuis received it in 1951. As of 2025, it is on loan to the Walters Art Museum in Baltimore, Maryland, United States, as the main "Artist's Residence" part of the Rubenshuis museum is closed for renovation.

== See also ==
- Cushi – Word generally used in the Hebrew Bible to refer to a dark-skinned person of African descent
- Cushite woman on Hebrew Wikipedia
- Art theft and looting during World War II
