= Rubenshuis =

Home of Peter Paul Rubens (1577–1640) in Antwerp

Coordinates: 51°13′2″N 4°24′33″E

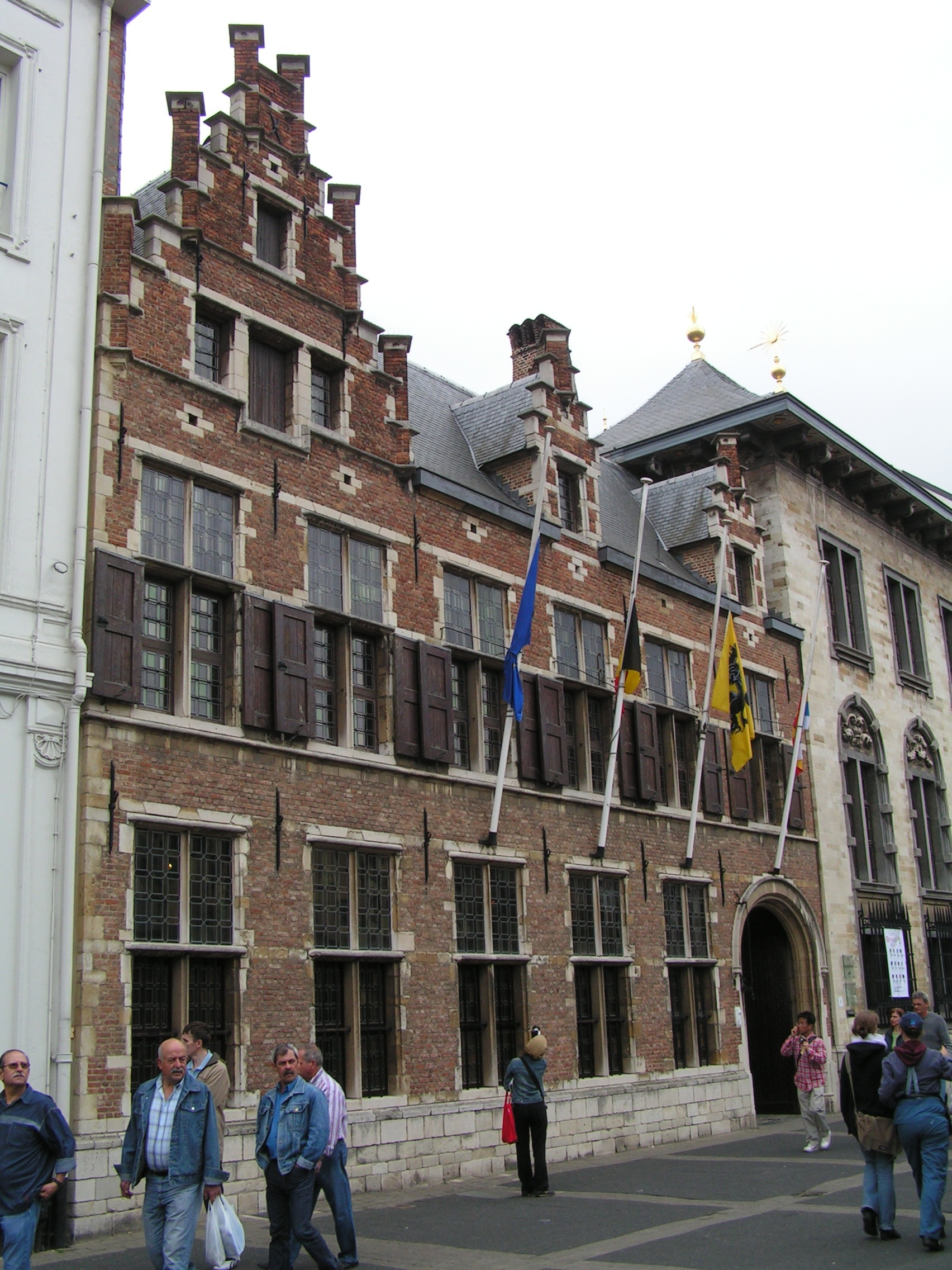
The Rubenshuis exterior, as seen from the Wapper

The Rubenshuis (Dutch for 'Rubens House') is the former home and workshop of Peter Paul Rubens (1577–1640) in Antwerp. Purchased in 1610, Rubens had the Flemish townhouse renovated and extended on the basis of designs by Rubens himself. After the renovations, the house and its courtyard garden had the outlook of an Italian palazzo, which reflected the artistic ideals of Rubens. The ensemble is now a museum dedicated mainly to the work of Rubens and his contemporaries.

The main "Artist's Residence" part of the museum is (November 2025) currently closed for renovation.

== Rubens's house during his lifetime ==
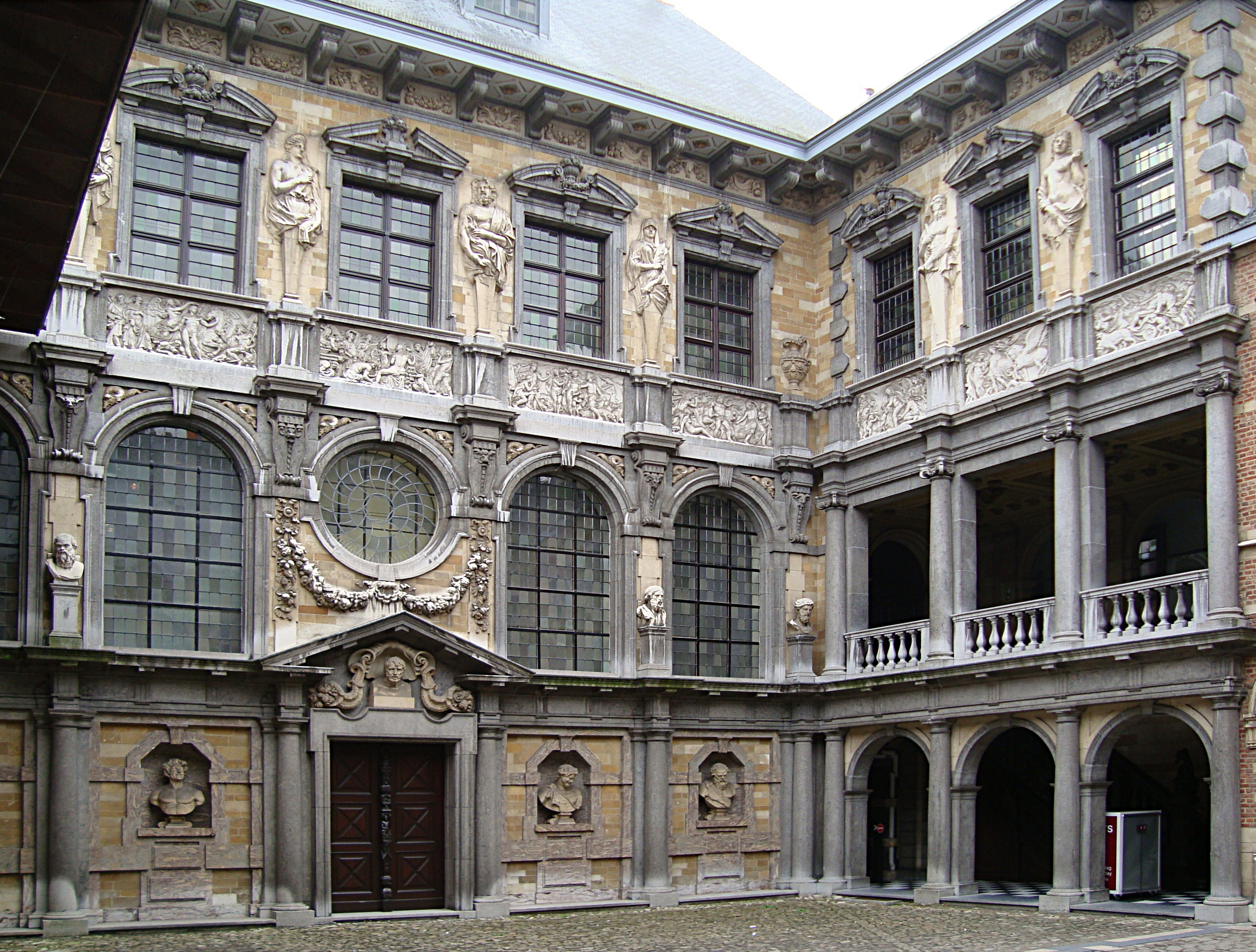
The interior courtyard

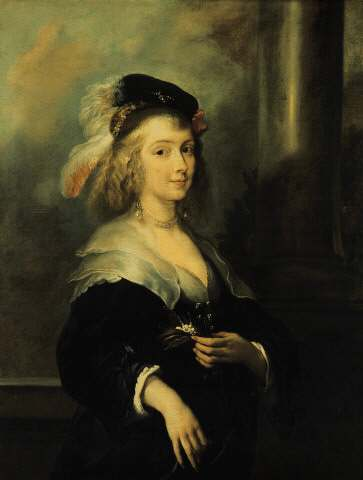
Portrait of a Woman (Helena Fourment)

A year after marrying Isabella Brant in 1609, Rubens began construction of an Italian-style villa on the then-Vaartstraat (now the Wapper, 9–11), at the time located at the banks of the Herentalse Vaart canal. Rubens designed the building himself, based on studies of Italian Renaissance palace architecture that also formed the basis of his Palazzi di Genova. The layout included his home, studio, a monumental portico and an interior courtyard. The courtyard opens into a Baroque garden that he also planned.

In the adjacent studio, he and his students executed many of the works for which Rubens is famous. He had established a well-organised workshop that met the demands of his active studio, including large commissions from England, France, Spain and Bavaria and other locations. He relied on students and collaborators for much of the actual work. Rubens himself, however, guaranteed the quality and often finished paintings with his own hand. In a separate private studio he made drawings, portraits and small paintings without the assistance of his students and collaborators.

== Rubens's house after his lifetime ==
Rubens spent most of his lifetime in this building. After his death, his wife Helena Fourment let the building to William Cavendish and his wife. After the latter left in 1660, the house was sold. At the Brussels International 1910 World's Fair there was a full-size reconstruction of the Rubens house, built by the architect Henri Blomme. The reconstruction was a romantic interpretation of what the building used to be, full of ornaments, but it promoted the idea to save the building. After his death in 1921, Blomme left a legacy to the city of Antwerp to buy the house. This finally happened in 1937.

The city bought the house in 1937 and after an extensive restoration the Rubenshuis was opened to the public in 1946. Dozens of paintings and artworks by Rubens and his contemporaries were installed in the rooms, as well as period furniture. Paintings include his early Adam and Eve (c. 1600) and a self portrait made when he was about fifty.

The Rubenianum, a centre and archive dedicated to the study of Rubens, is in a building at the rear of the garden.

== Collection ==
=== By Rubens ===
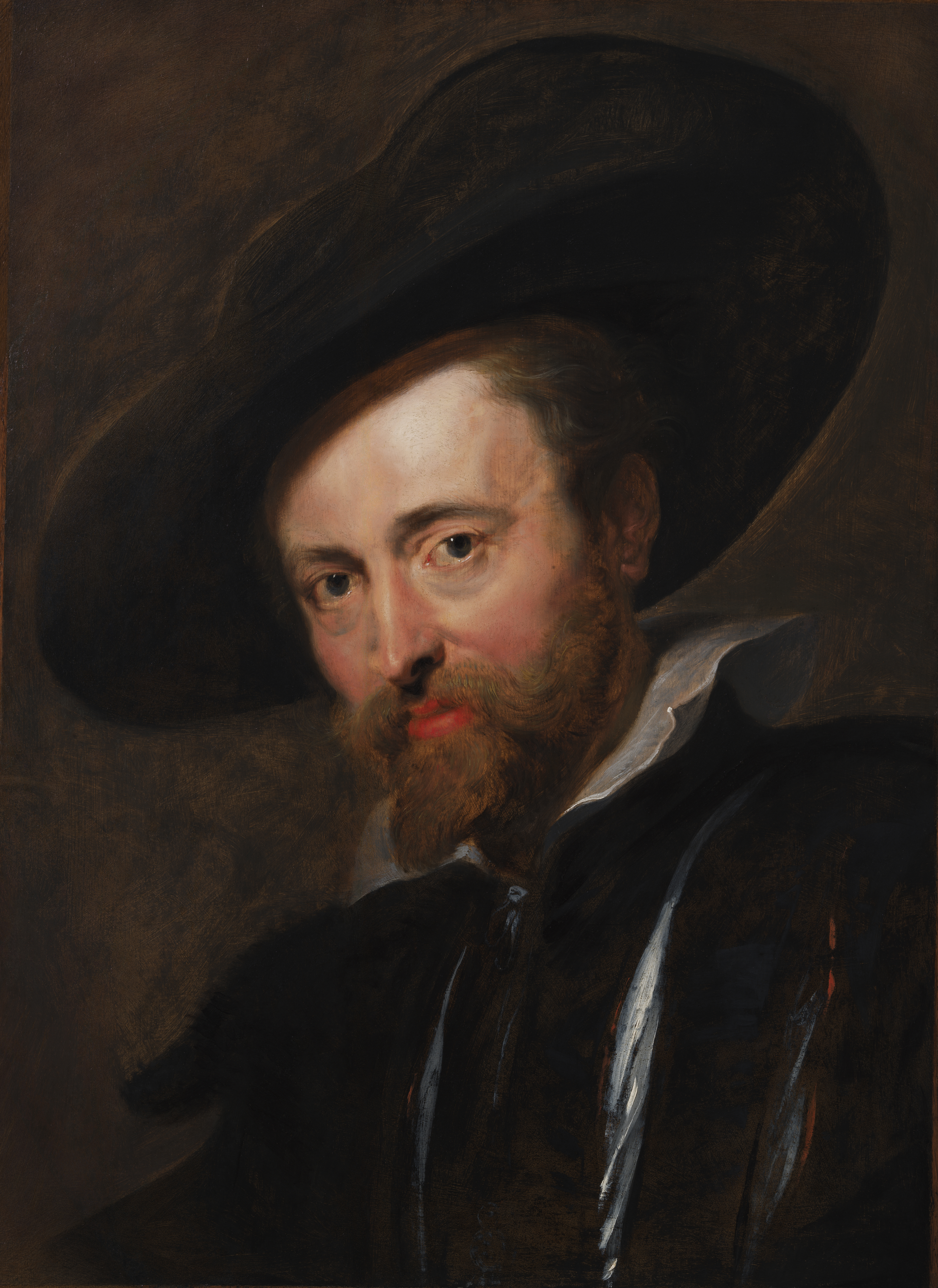
Self-portrait

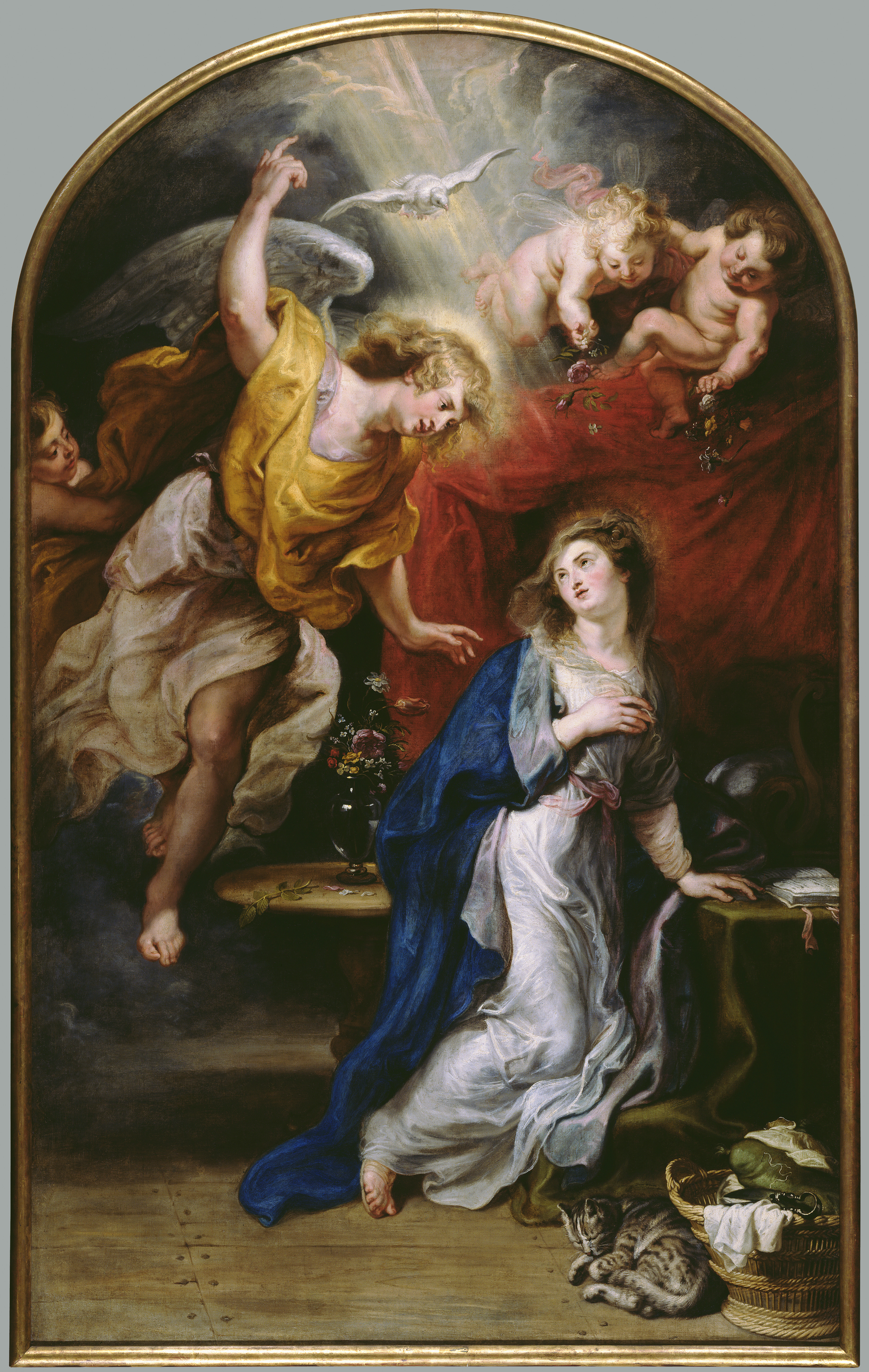
Annunciation

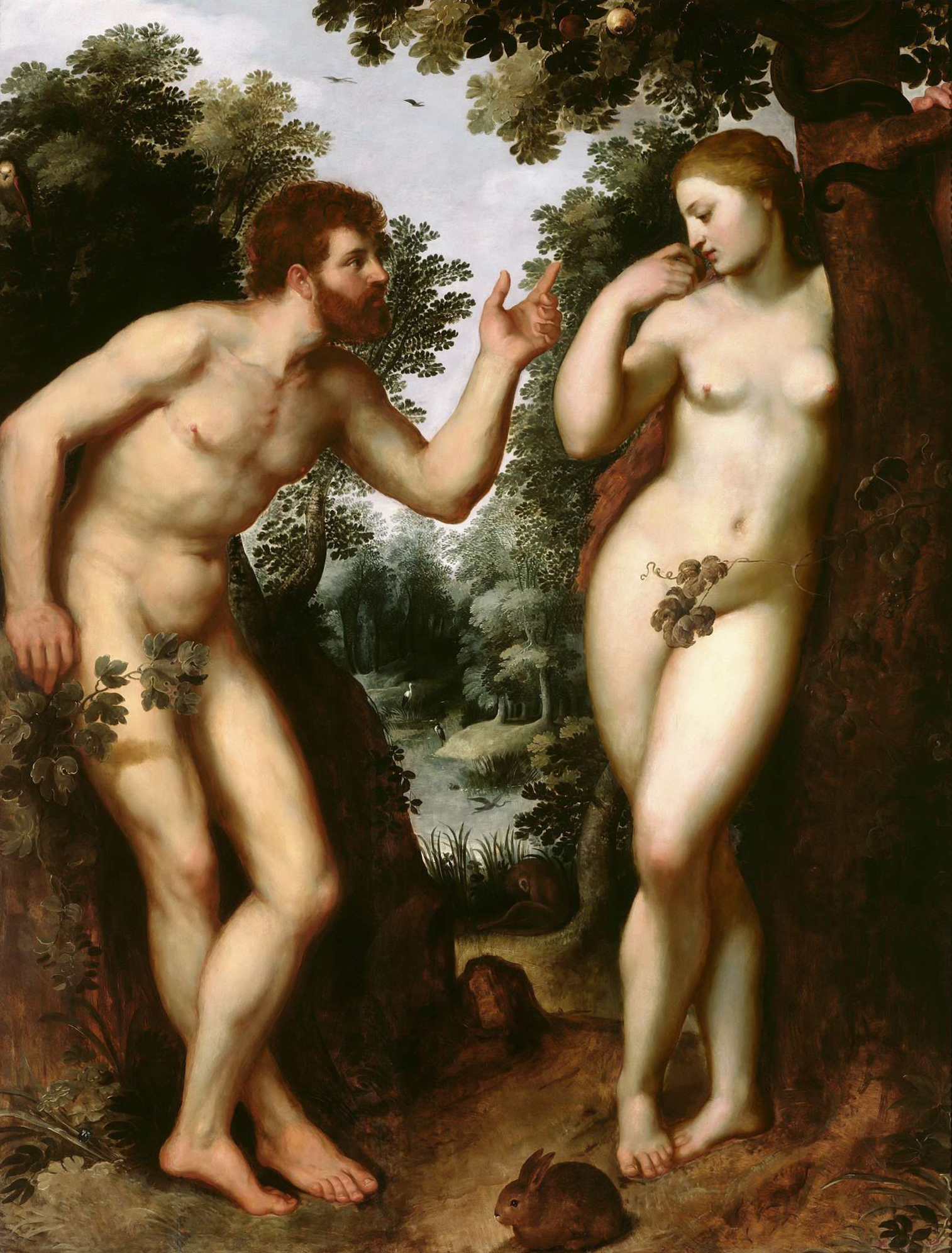
Adam and Eve

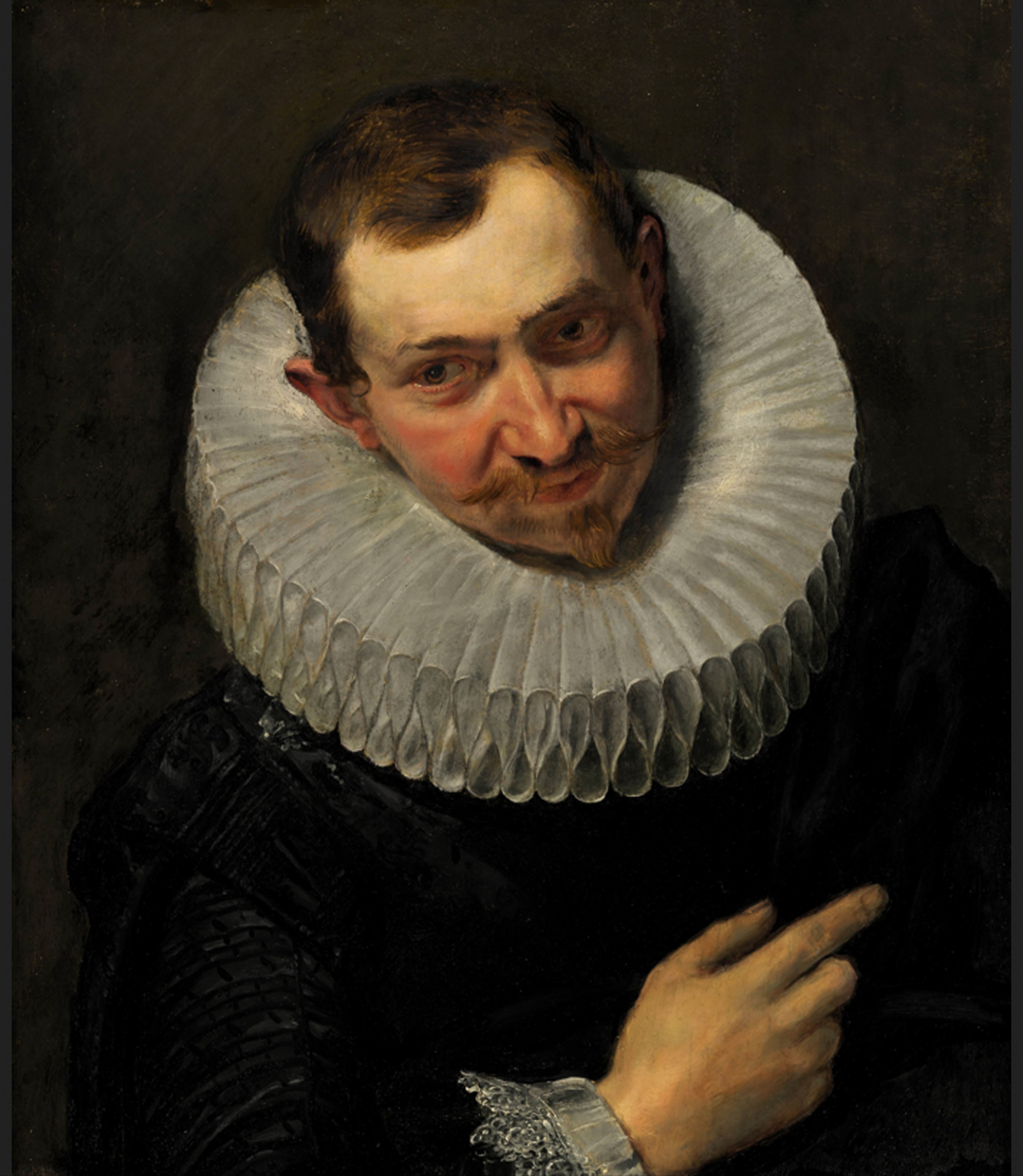
Portrait of the landscape painter Jan Wildens

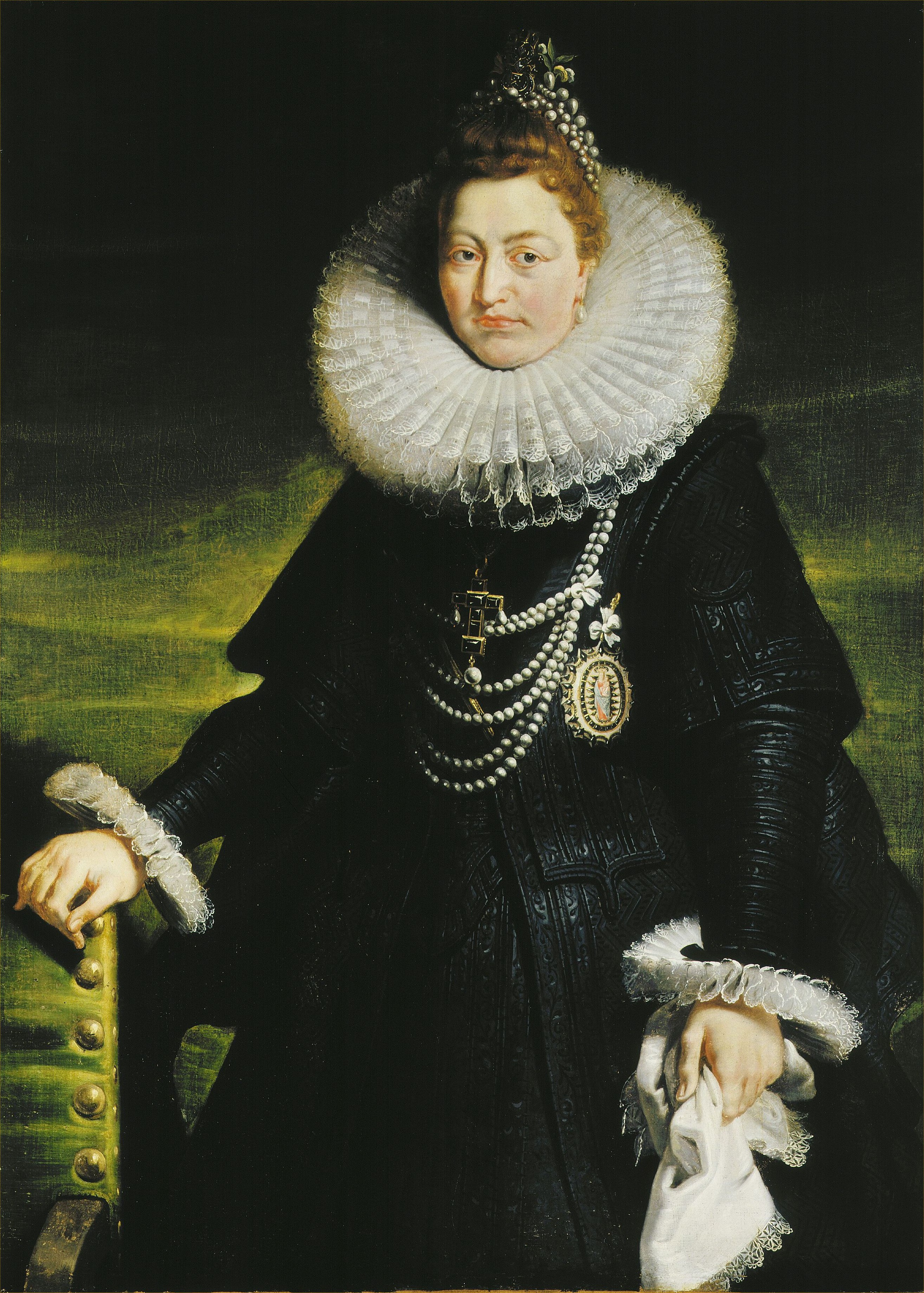
Portrait of Isabella Clara Eugenia

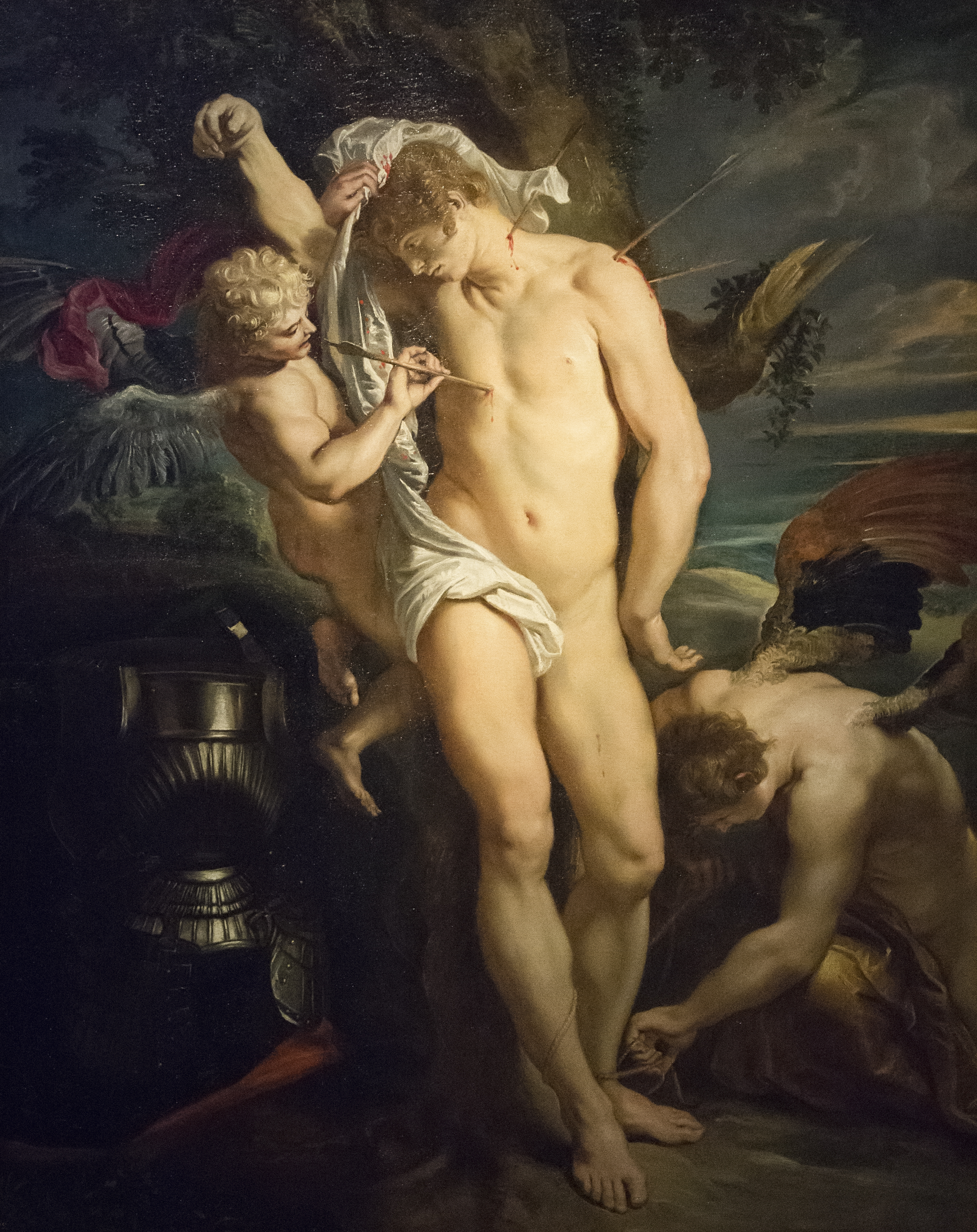
Saint Sebastian

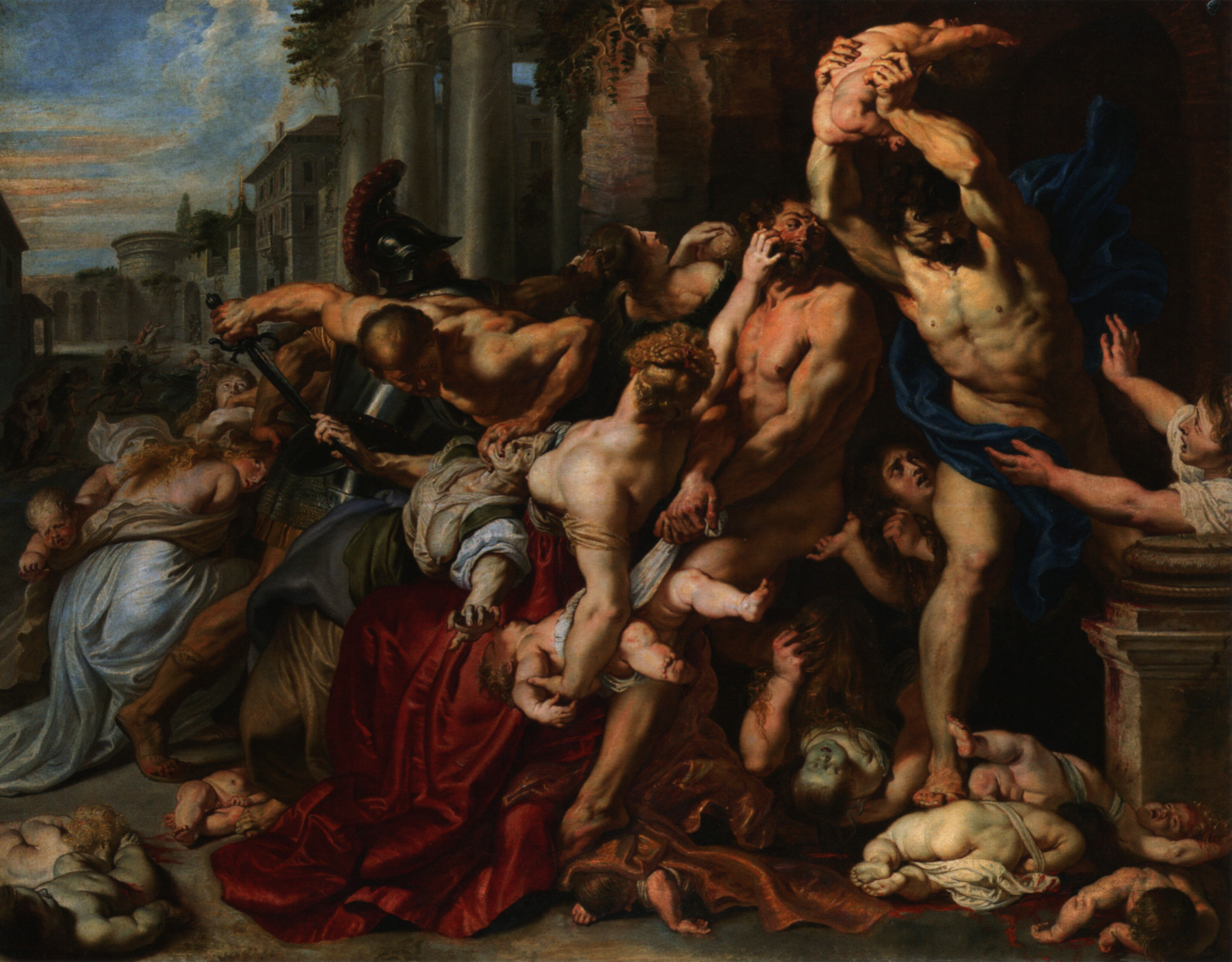
Massacre of the Innocents exhibited at temporary exhibition

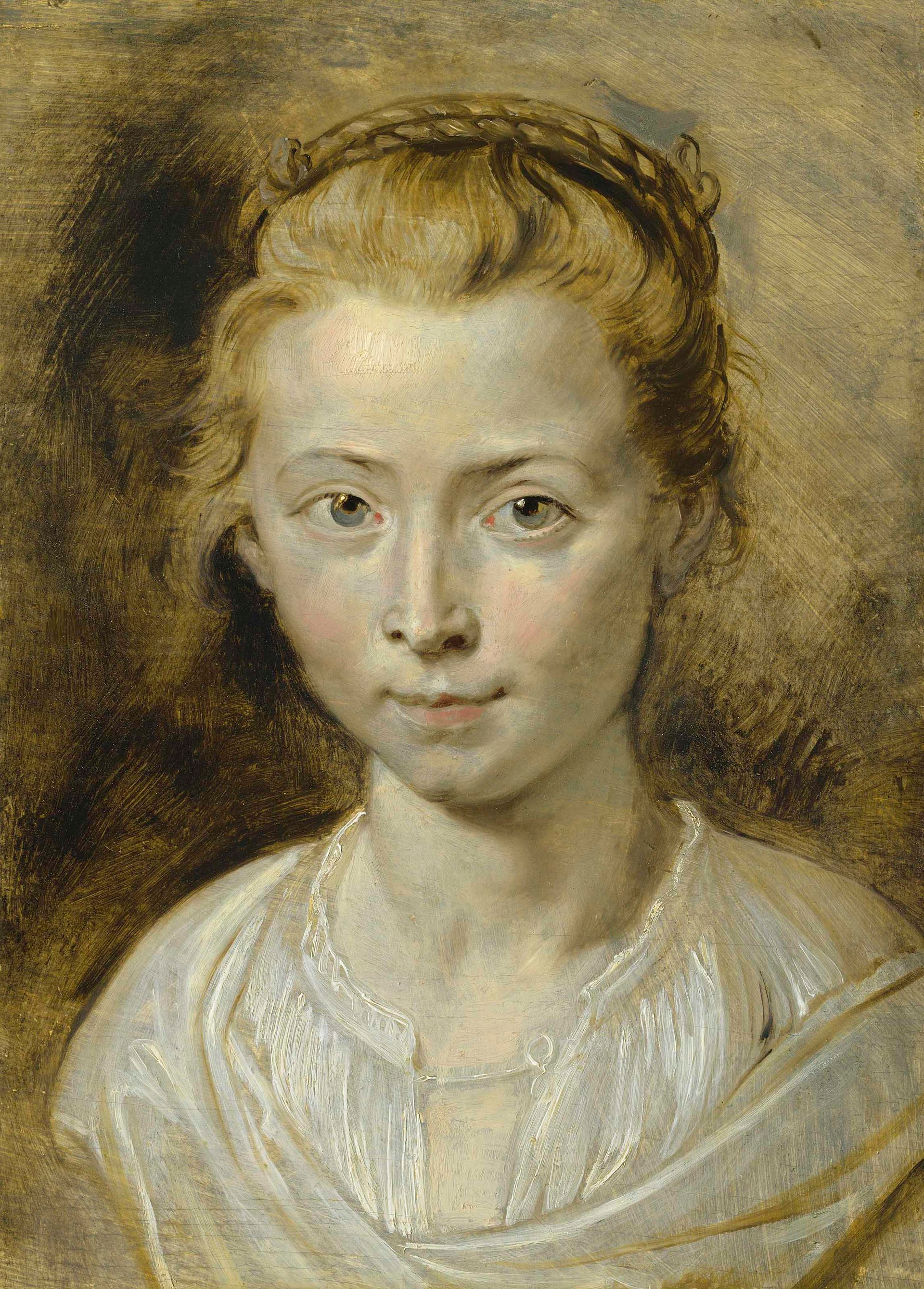
Clara Serena Rubens

=== By others ===
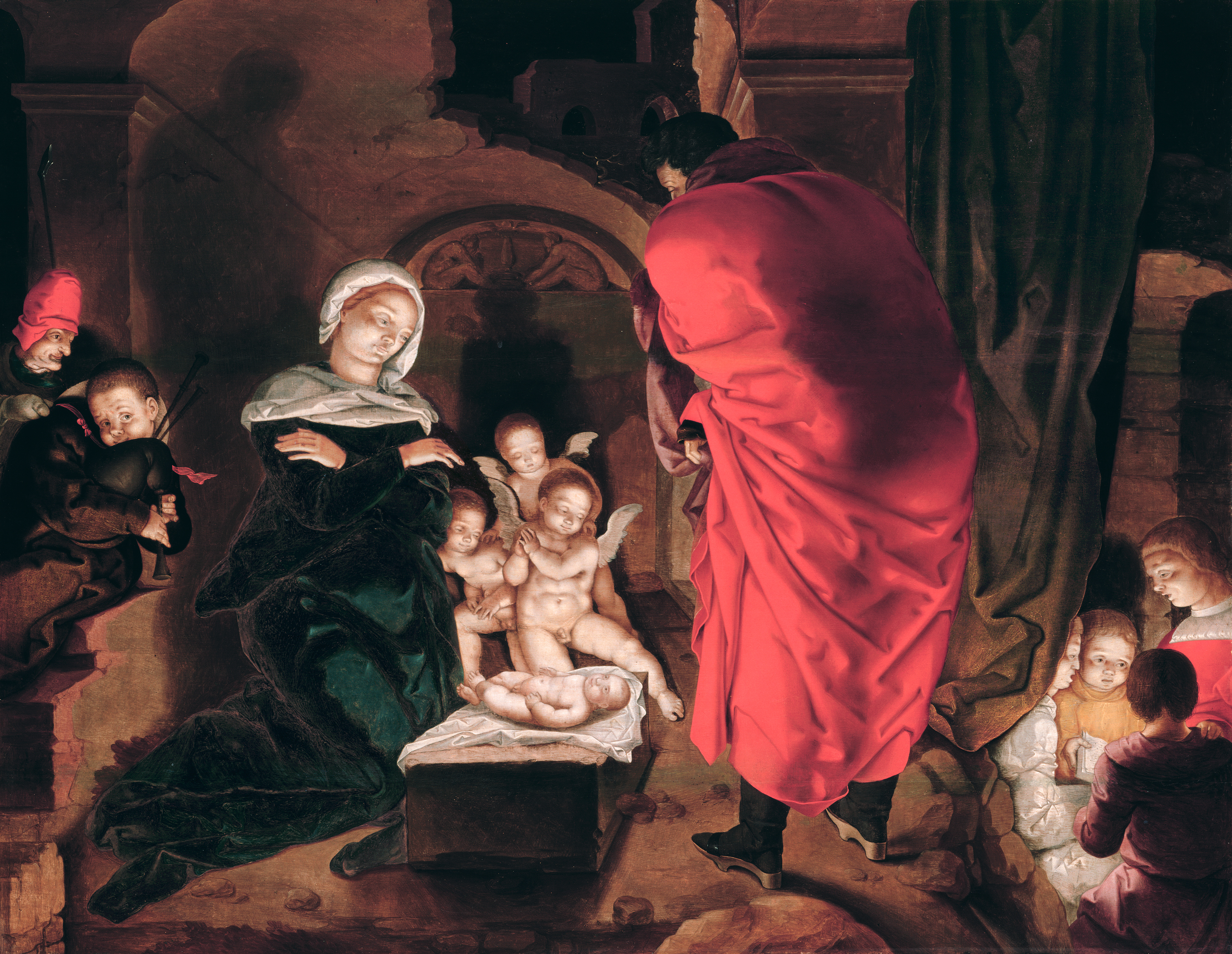
Aertgen van Leyden, Nativity

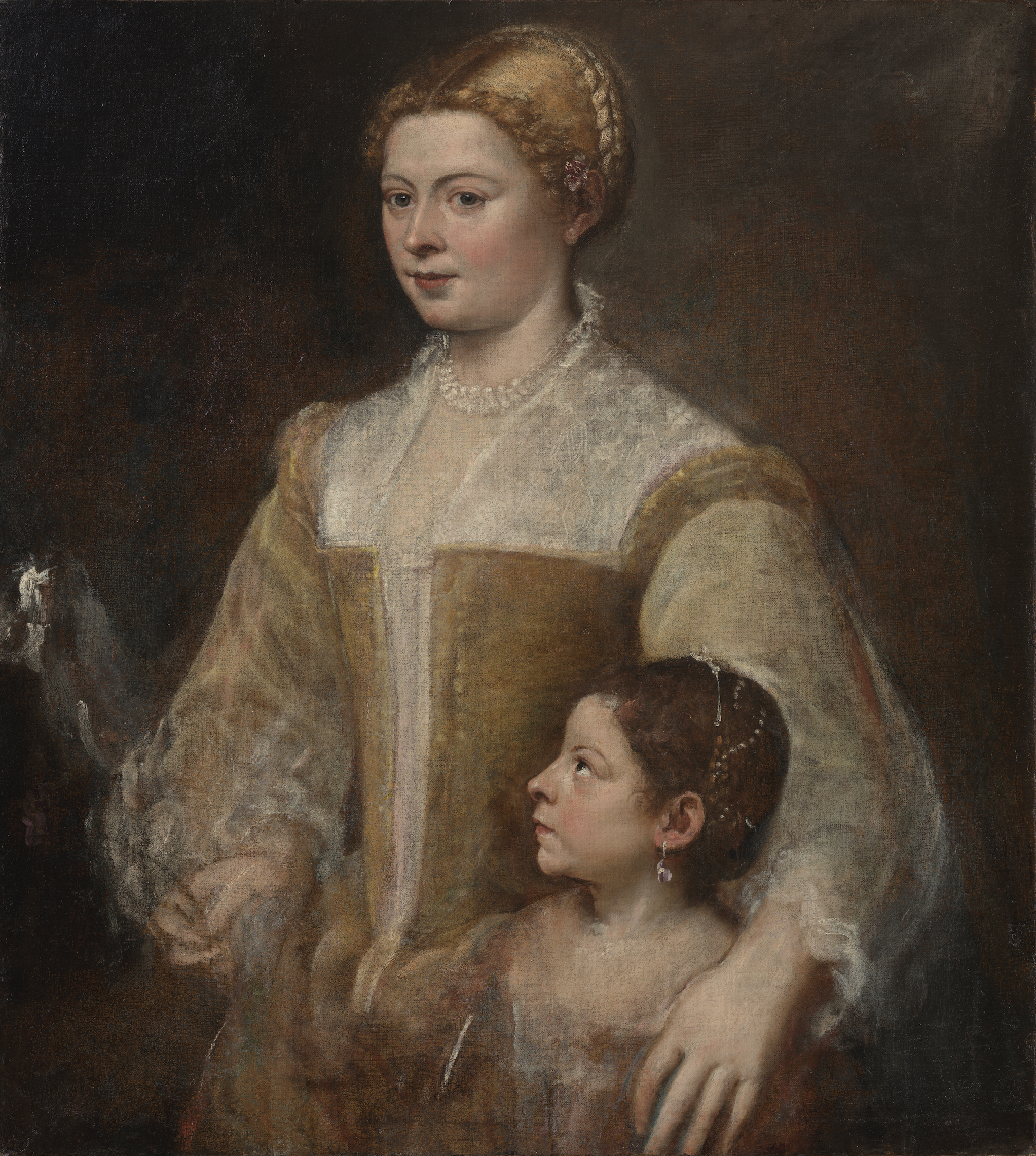
Titian, Portrait of a Lady and her Daughter

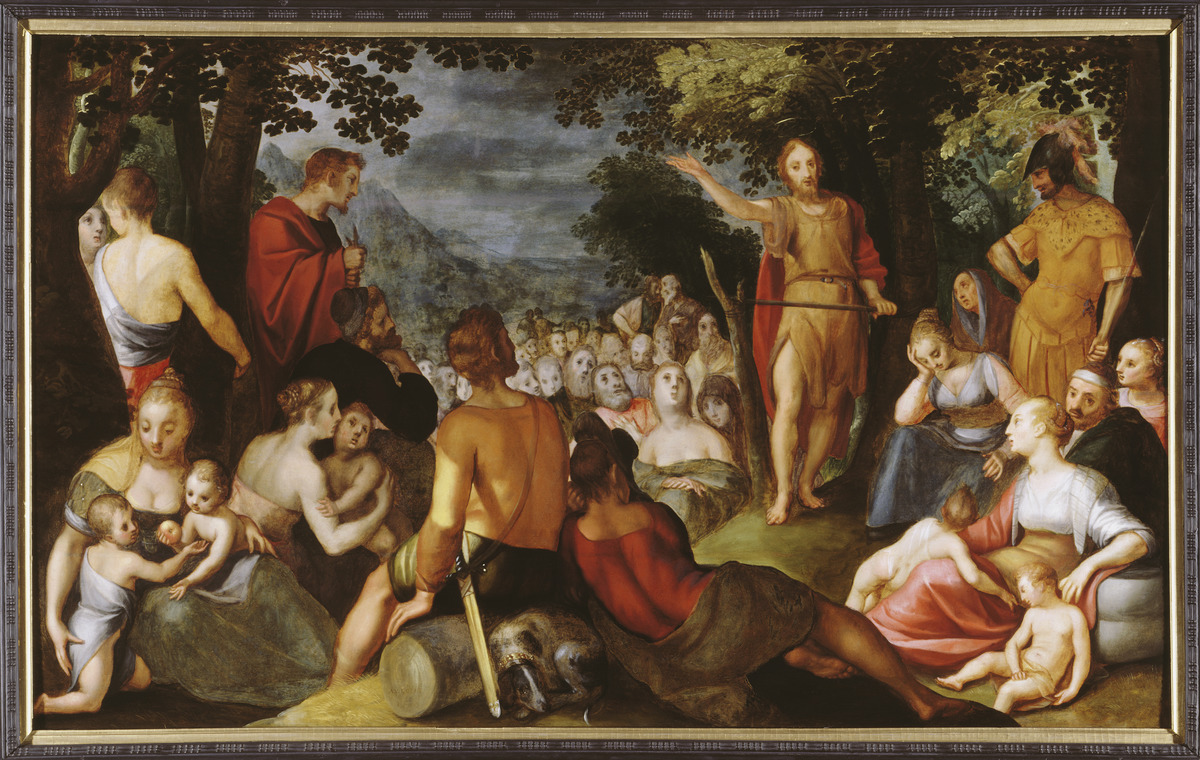
Adam van Noort, The preaching of St John the Baptist

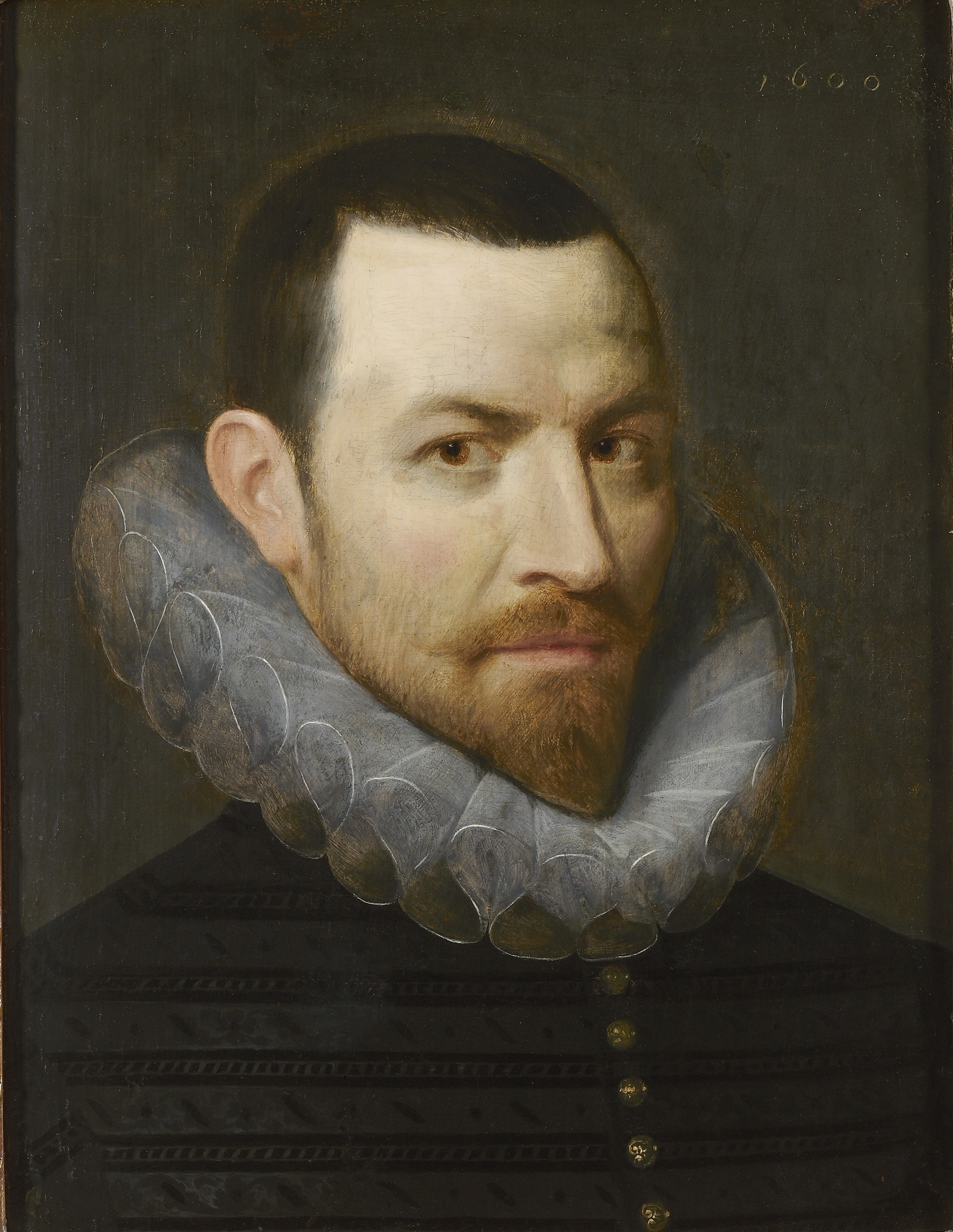
Otto van Veen, portrait of Nicolaas Rockox

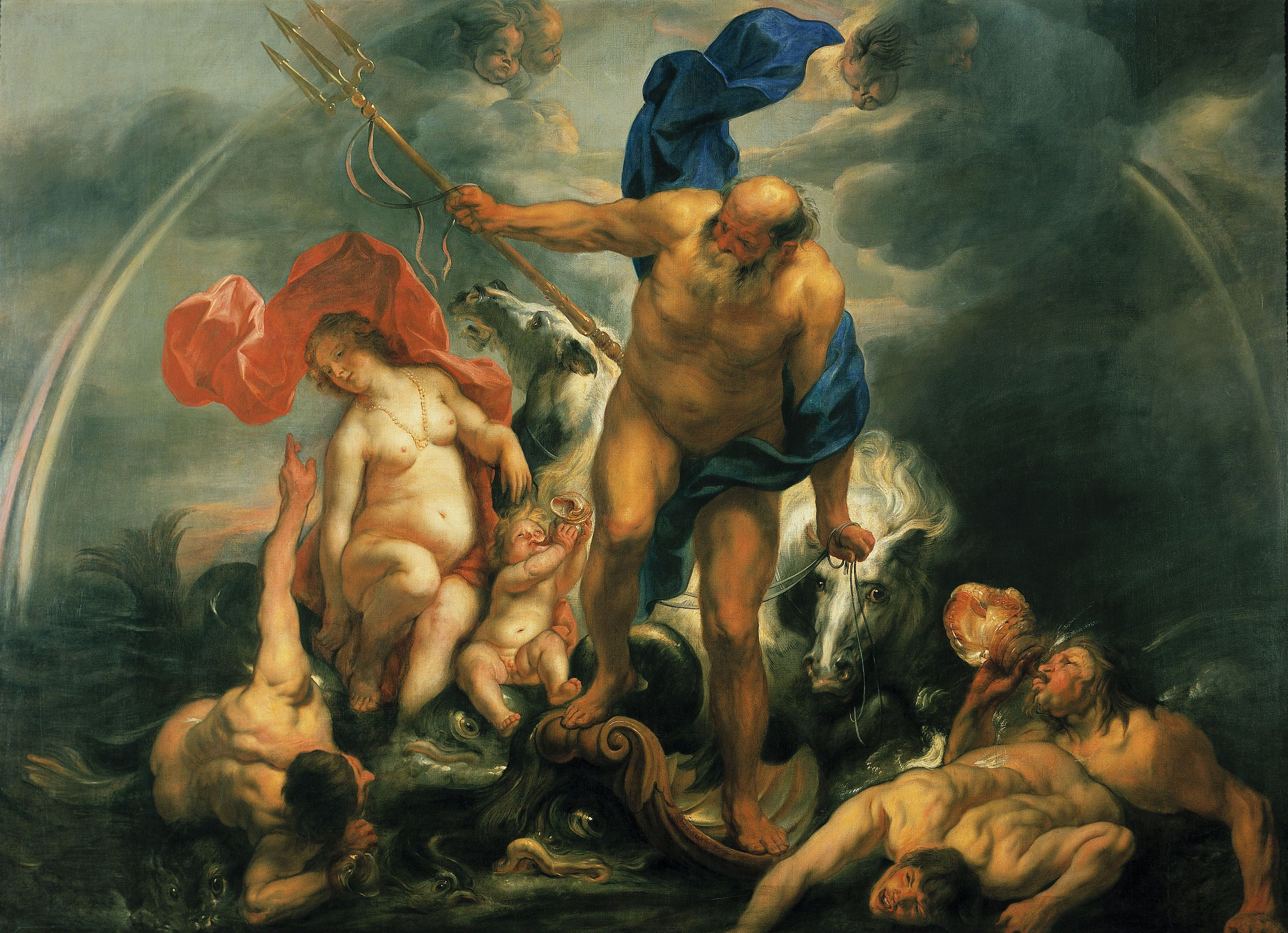
Jacob Jordaens, Neptune and Amphitrite in the storm

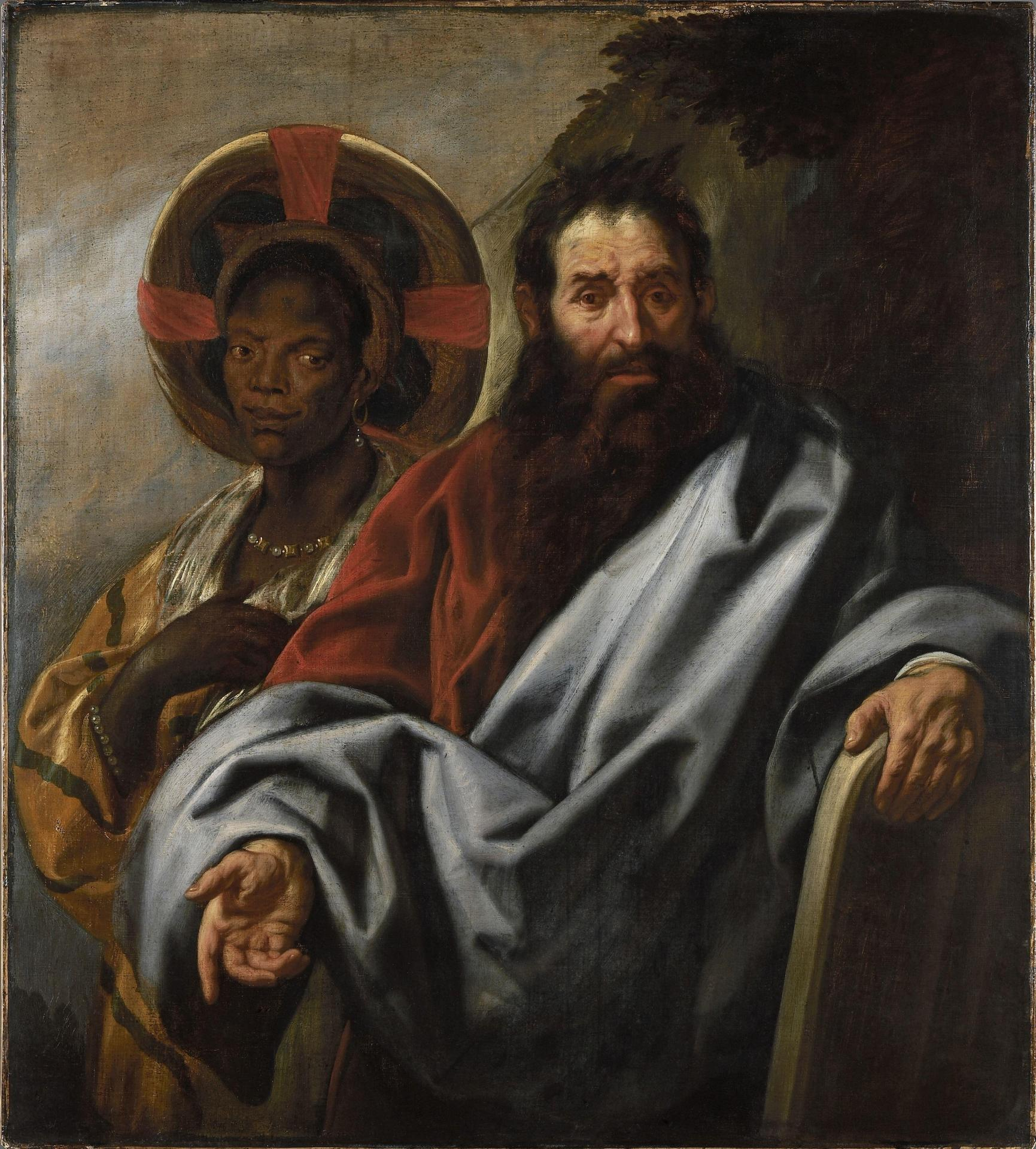
Jordaens, Moses and his Ethiopian wife Zipporah

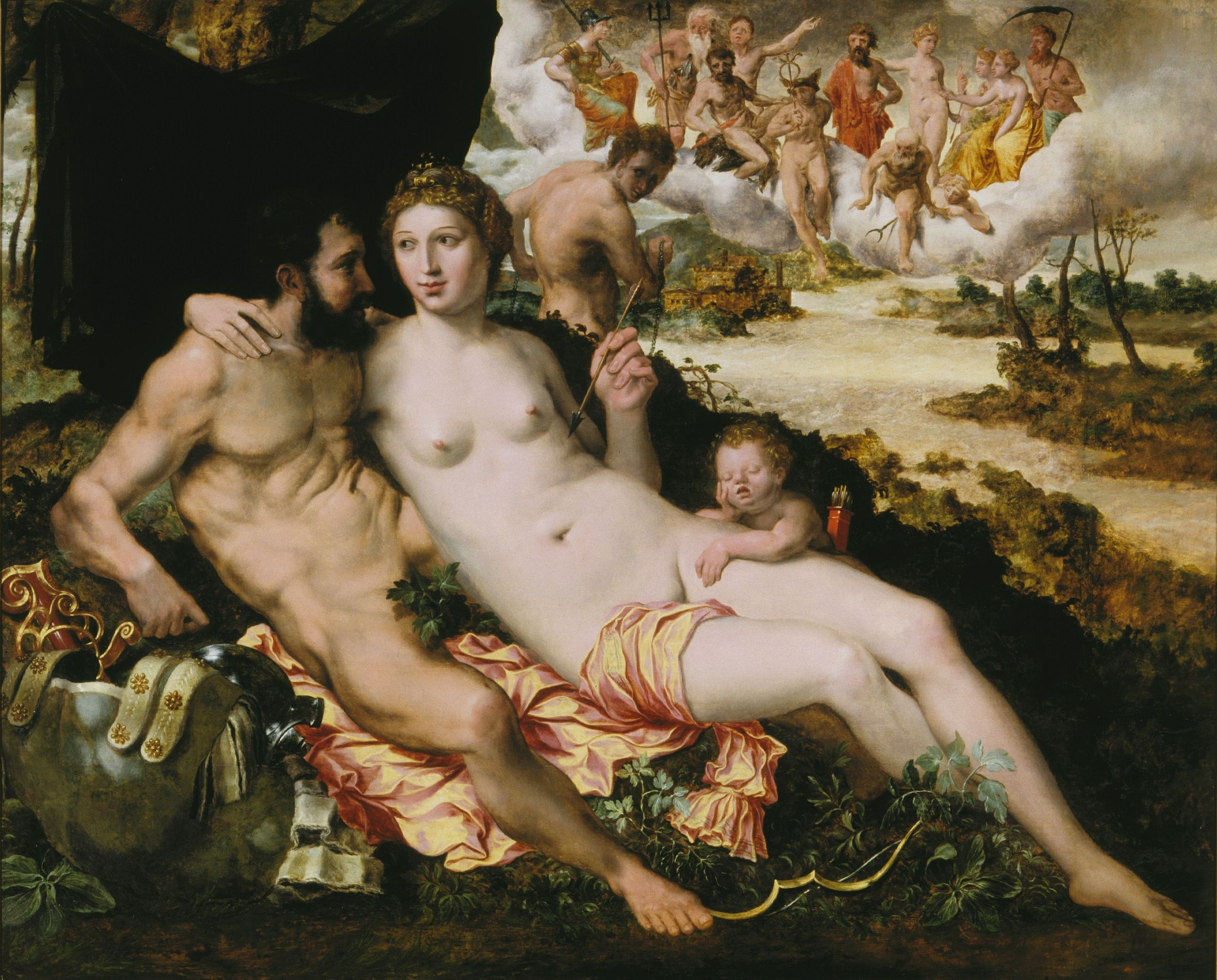
Frans Floris, Venus and Mars

Willem van Haecht, The Gallery of Cornelis van der Geest

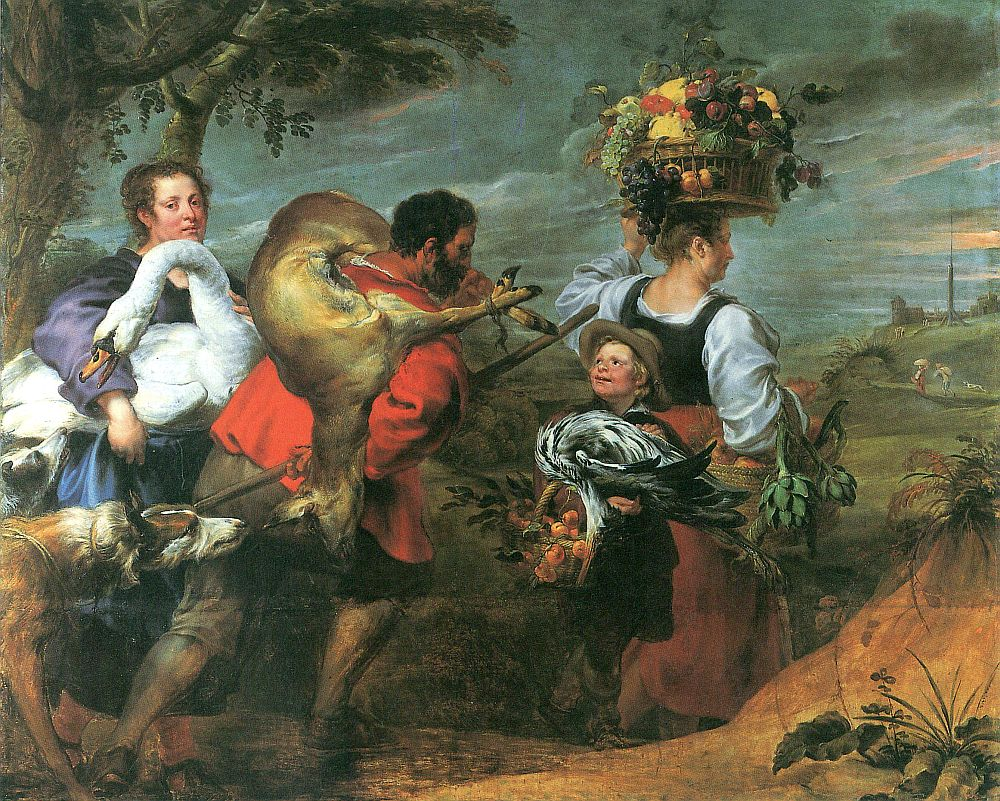
Jan Boeckhorst and Frans Snyders, Peasants on the Way to the Market

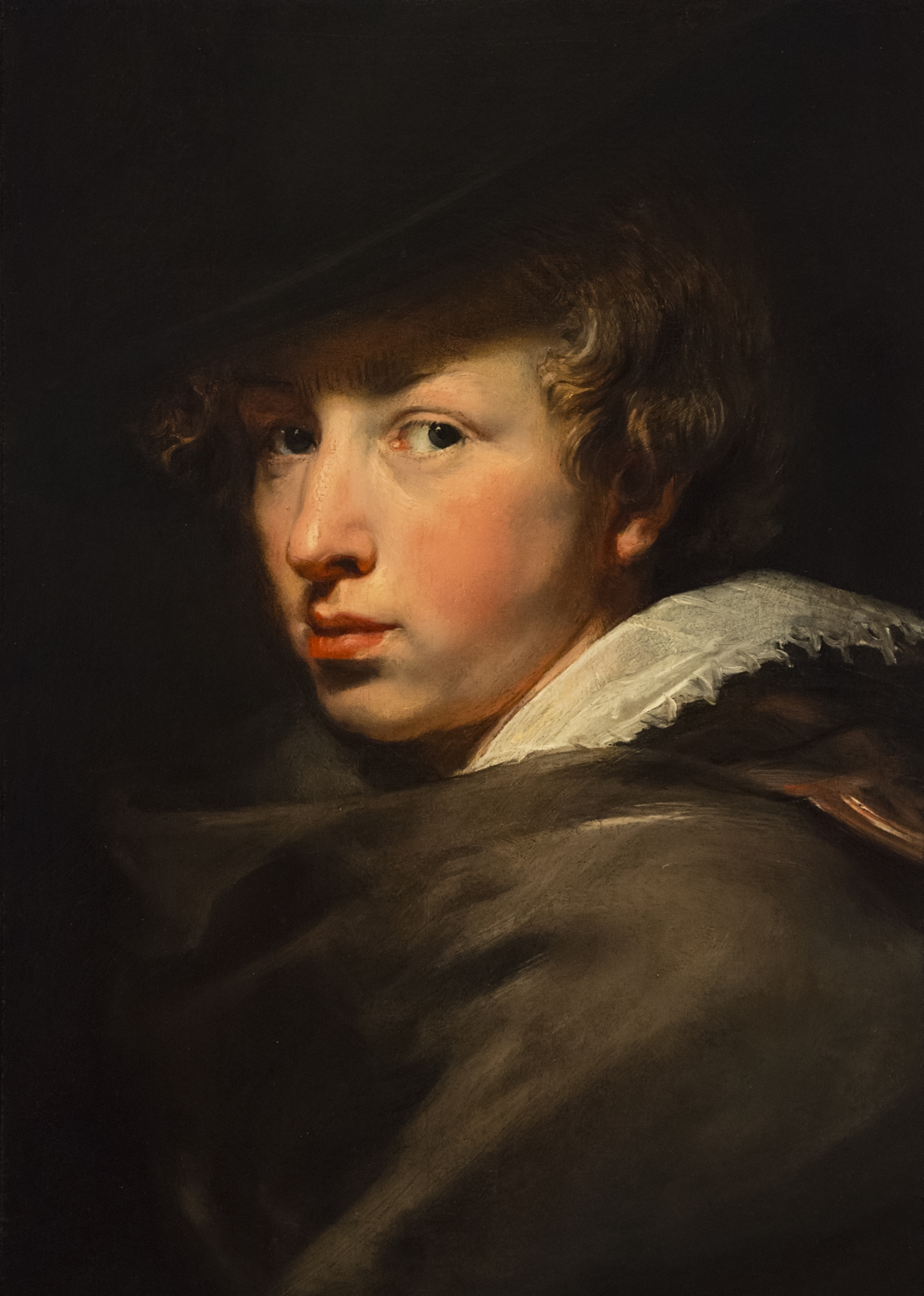
Anthony van Dyck, Self-portrait

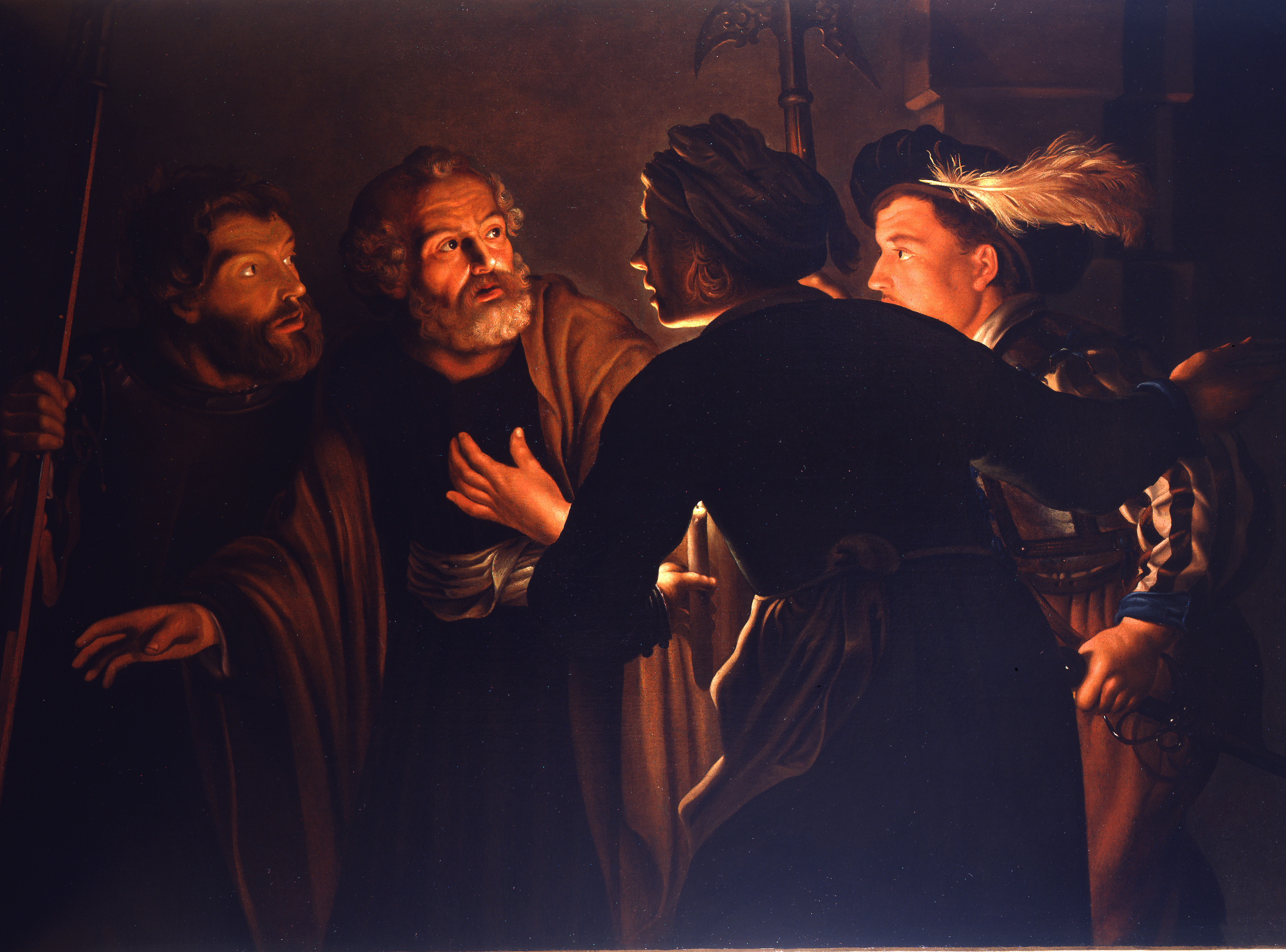
Adam de Coster, The Denial of Saint Peter

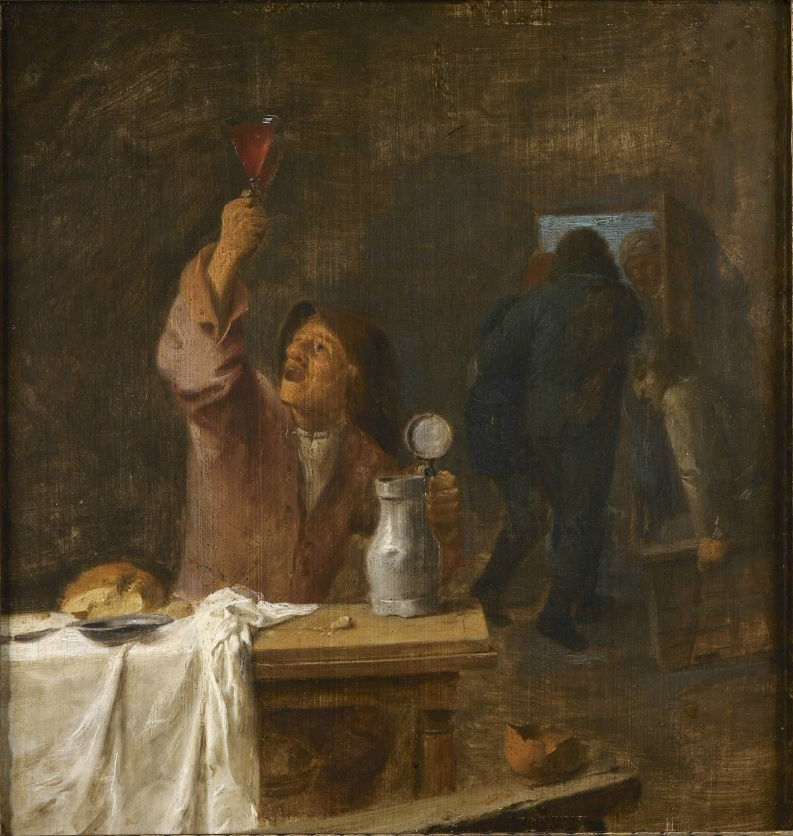
Adriaen Brouwer, Drinking peasant

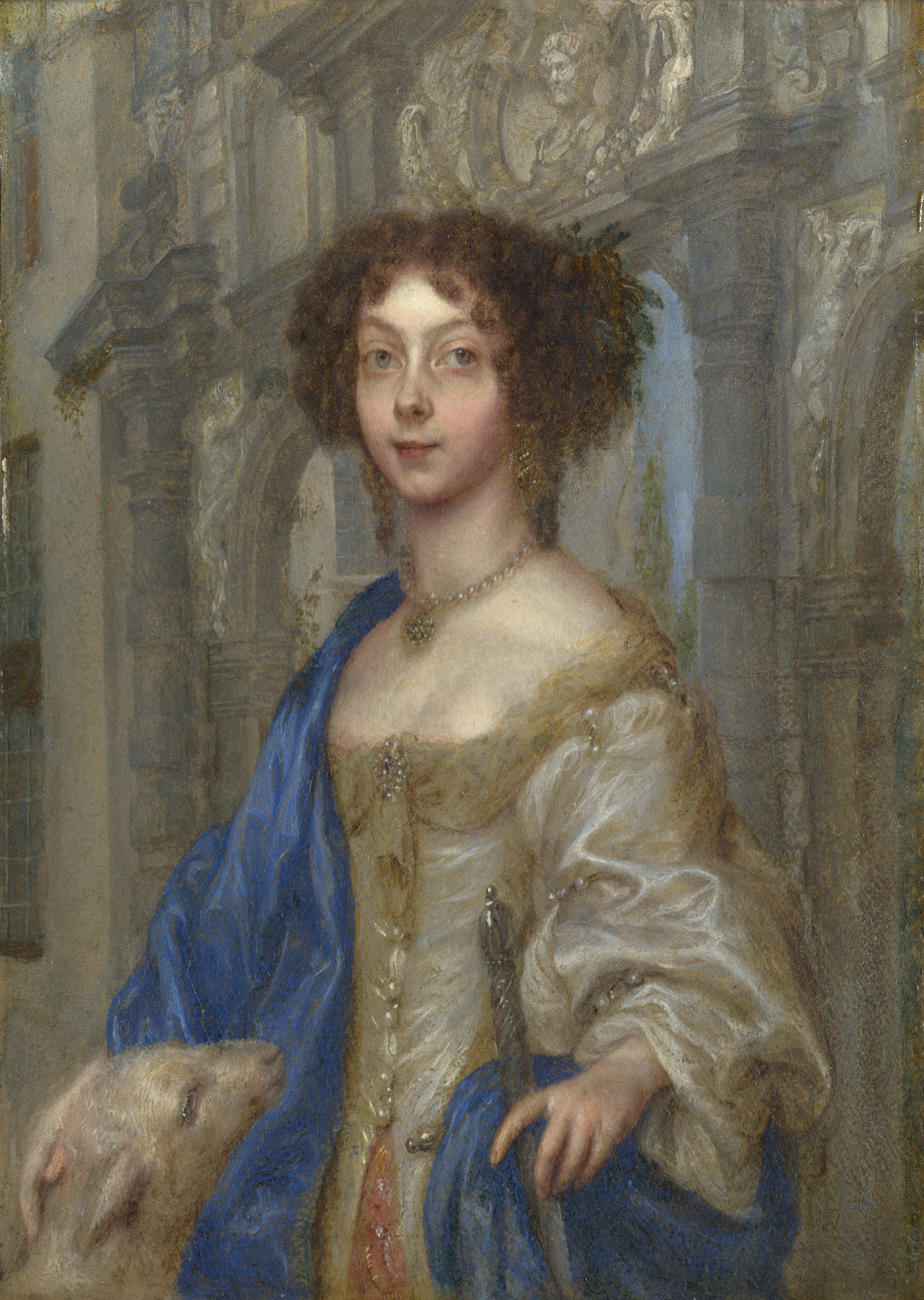
Gonzales Coques, Saint Agnes

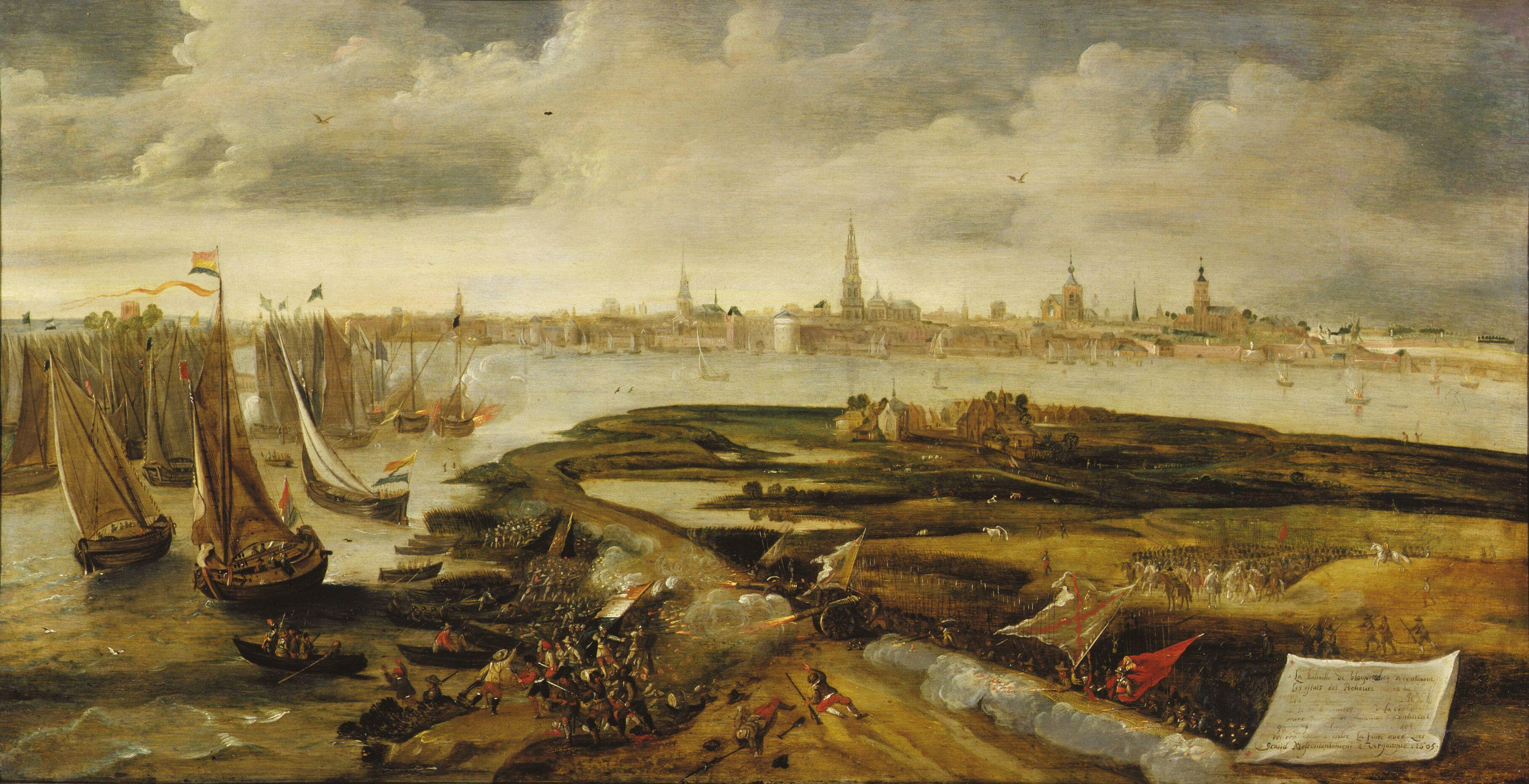
Bonaventura Peeters, The battle at the Blokkersdijk of 1605

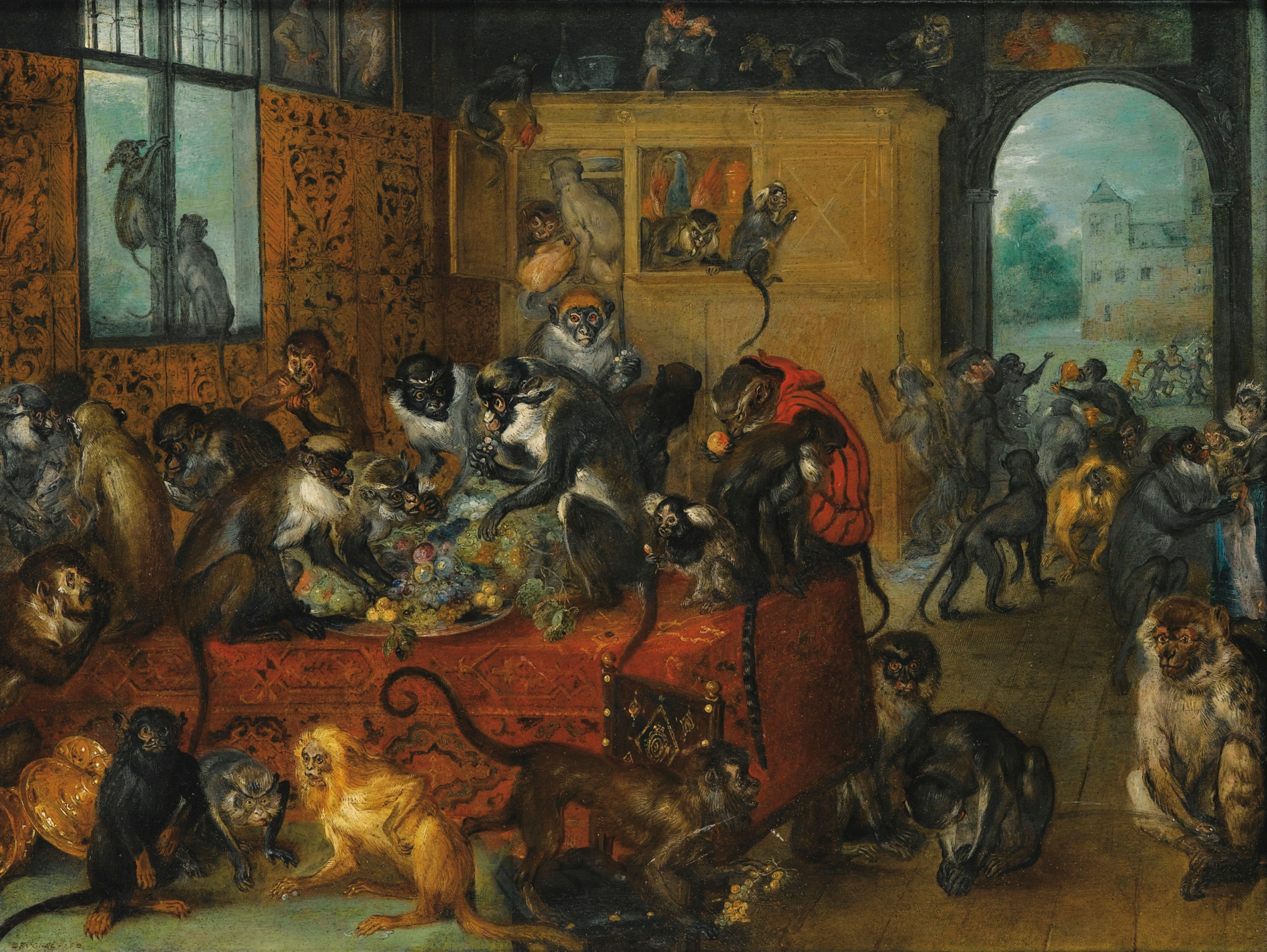
Jan Brueghel the Elder, Monkeys feasting

== See also ==
- Rockox House
- List of single-artist museums
