= Shemot =

Shemot (Hebrew, 'names') may refer to:

- Book of Exodus, or Shemot
- Shemot (parashah), in the Jewish cycle of Torah readings
