= Moshe ibn Habib =

Rishon LeZion and Hakham Bashi (1654–1696)

- משה בן רבי שלמה אבן חביב

Personal life
- Born: 1654 Salonika, Ottoman Empire
- Died: 1696 (aged 41–42) Jerusalem, Ottoman Empire
- Spouse: Daughter of Rabbi Jonathan Galanti
- Children: Daughter married Rabbi Machir Culi; Daughter married Rabbi Moshe Israel
- Parent: Rabbi Shlomo ibn Habib
- Notable works: Get Pashut; Ezrat Nashim; Shammot ba-Aretz
- Known for: Expertise in laws of marriage and divorce
- Occupation: Rishon LeZion, Hakham Bashi, head of yeshiva
- Relatives: Rabbi Jacob ibn Habib (forefather), Joseph ibn Habib (forefather)

Religious life
- Religion: Judaism

Moshe ibn Habib (Hebrew: משה בן רבי שלמה אבן חביב; 1654–1696) was the Rishon LeZion (Sephardic chief Rabbi of Israel), Hakham Bashi (chief rabbi of the Ottoman Empire) and the head of a major yeshiva in Jerusalem.

== Background and family ==
ibn Habib was born in 1654 in Salonika. His father, Rabbi Shlomo ibn Habib was a scion of a distinguished family that was forced to emigrate from Spain. Among his forefathers were Rabbi Jacob ibn Habib, the author the famous book Ein Yaakov and Joseph ibn Habib, author of the commentary Nimmuke Yosef.

At the age of 15 Moses moved to Jerusalem, where he enrolled in the yeshiva of Rabbi Jacob Hagiz. He married the daughter of Rabbi Jonathan Galanti, whose son, Rabbi Moses Galanti, the Rishon LeZion, was known as The Magen.

Both of ibn Habib's daughters married prominent scholars:

- Rabbi Machir Culi, father of the famous scholar Rabbi Yaakov Culi, who initiated the collection Me'am Lo'ez
- Rabbi Moshe Israel, the emissary of the communities of Safed and Jerusalem to diaspora Jewry.

== Positions, novellæ and other works ==
Upon his arrival in Jerusalem, despite his young age, ibn Habib was immediately recognized for his extraordinary talents. Such distinguished Jerusalemite scholars as Rabbi Hezekiah da Silva, the author of the work Peri Hadash, Rabbi Ephraim Navon, author of the work Mahane Ephraim and even his master Rabbi Jacob Hagiz recognized him as their equal and maintained halachic discourses with him.

At some point, ibn Habib was sent as an emissary to the Jewish community Turkey; however, other than the fact of his dispatch, nothing else is known about this period of his life.

When his brother-in-law Rabbi Moshe Galanti died in 1689, ibn Habib was appointed Rishon LeZion and head of the yeshiva in his stead. His colleagues on the rabbinical court included the Jerusalemite scholars R. Jacob Molkho, R. Yom Tov Zahalon and R. Yoseph bar Yoseph.

Though young in years, ibn Habib was well known for his erudition and scholarship in all areas of the Torah. However, his primary expertise was in the area of the laws of marriage and divorce and particularly in the thorny areas of the laws dealing with agunot ('anchored or chained' women). He authored two works in this area, Get Pashut and Ezrat Nashim, which remain standard references in these area to this day.

ibn Habib wrote another book entitled Shammot ba-Aretz, which contains his Talmudic novellæ. The work is divided into three sections:

- Yom Teruah, novellæ on Tracate Rosh Hashana (Ortakeni, 1714)
- Tosphot Yom Hakipurim, novellæ on Tracate Yoma (Constantinople, 1727 )
- Kapot Temarim, novellæ on Tracate Succah (Constantinople, 1731)

The work has been widely respected among Talmudic scholars since its publication, and it has been the subject of novellae by Rabbi Akiva Eger and Rabbi Joseph Saul Nathanson. The manuscript of his responsa was lost at sea; part survived and was published under the title Kol Gadol (Great Sound) in 1907 in Jerusalem.

ibn Habib served as the rabbi and Jerusalem and the head of the yeshiva until the day he died in 1696, before his 43rd birthday. He did not live to see any of his manuscripts published. However, his grandson (his daughter's son) Rabbi Jacob Culi edited his manuscripts and saw to their publication. At the time there was no printing press in Jerusalem and Rabbi Jacob traveled to Constantinople with the manuscript to try to get it published. Although he arrived there in 1714, the manuscript was only published in 1725, 25 years after the author's death. The publisher cited the help of Rabbi Haim Alfandari.

== See also ==
- Jonah Nabon

== Bibliography ==
- Azulai, Shem ha-Gedolim;
- Benjacob, Otzar ha-Sefarim
