= Acha bar Hanina =

4th-century Judean scholar of the Talmud

Rabbi Acha bar Hanina was an Israeli rabbi of the third generation of Amoraim who lived in the 4th century). His name appears many times in the Babylonian Talmud, and a few times in the Jerusalem Talmud.

== Biography ==
His father, Rabbi Chanina, is mentioned several times in rabbinic literature. His mother was the sister (or possibly daughter) of Rabbi Shmuel bar Nachum.

Originally he lived in the south of Israel, probably in Lod. In several places the Talmud says, "When Rabbi Acha bar Chanina came from the south," presumably to the Sanhedrin which sat in Tiberias. He brought with him teachings of other rabbis who lived in the south, such as of Rabbi Joshua ben Levi, who was a resident of Lod.

In Tiberias he studied under Rabbi Assi, and received the teachings of Rabbi Johanan bar Nappaha from him. His friend was Rabbi Jacob bar Idi. The Talmud records a debate between them about the meaning of "afflictions of love."

It seems he was poor, as it is said that he went to the market wearing patched shoes. He praised one who studies Torah despite economic pressures, and those who did not rely on the merit of his ancestors for food.

It seems that he emigrated to Babylon which is why his teachings appear more frequently in the Bablyonian Talmud. The Talmud records a discussion between Rabbi Acha and Rav Pappa who was one of the leading rabbis in Babylon. Though there are variant texts of this exchange.

His father, Rabbi Chanina is sometimes referred to in relation to his son, "Rabbi Chanina, father of Rabbi Acha." His uncle, his mother's brother (or according to another version, his mother's father) was a sage called Shmuel bar Nachum, who was considered an expert in Aggadah.

Rabbi Judah bar Titus taught teachings in the name of Rabbi Acha.

Most of his teachings are in matters of Aggadah or bringing sources from the Bible to support Halakhic statements.

== Teachings ==
- A promise for a good attribute never came out of the mouth of the Holy One, blessed is He, and was changed to become bad, except for once.
- Anyone who says: This teaching is pleasant but this is not pleasant, loses the fortune of Torah.
- Anyone who visits an ill person takes from him one-sixtieth of his pain.
- The World-to-Come is not like this world. In this world, for good news one recites: 'Blessed…Who is good and does good, and over bad news one recites: Blessed…the true Judge.' In the World-to-Come one will always recite: 'Blessed…Who is good and does good.'
