= Raphael Chiyya Pontremoli =

Raphael Chiyya Pontremoli is the author of the Meam Loez on Esther and the editor of Simcha LeIsh by Rabbi Chaim Shunshol.

== Biography ==
He was born in Smyrna (Turkey) from an important dynasty of rabbis. Potremoli's family came from Italy.

== See also ==
- Hiyya Pontremoli
- Benjamin Pontremoli
