= Jacob Hagiz =

Jewish Talmudist and rabbi (1620–1674)

- יעקב חגיז

Personal life
- Born: 1620 Fez, Morocco
- Died: 1674 (aged 53–54) Constantinople; Ottoman Empire
- Spouse: Daughter of David Karigal
- Children: Daughter married Moses ibn Ḥabib; Daughter married Moses Ḥayyun
- Notable works: Teḥillat Ḥokhmah; Oraḥ Mishor; Petil Tekhelet; Eẓ ha-Ḥayyim
- Known for: Opposing Sabbatai Zevi, numerous Talmudic and rabbinical writings
- Occupation: Talmudist, rabbi
- Relatives: Nehemiah Hayyun (grandson)

Religious life
- Religion: Judaism

Jewish leader
- Teacher: David Karigal
- Students: Moses ibn Ḥabib, Joseph Almosnino

Jacob Hagiz (1620–1674) (Hebrew: יעקב חגיז) was a Jewish Talmudist born of a Sephardic Jewish family at Fez, Morocco.

== Life ==
Ḥagiz's teacher was David Karigal who afterward became his father-in-law. In about 1646, Ḥagiz went to Italy for the purpose of publishing his books, and remained there until after 1656, supporting himself by teaching. Samuel di Pam, rabbi at Livorno, calls himself a pupil of Ḥagiz. About 1657, Ḥagiz left Livorno for Jerusalem, where the Vega brothers of Livorno had founded a beit midrash for him, and where he became a member of the rabbinical college. There a large number of eager young students gathered about him, among whom were Moses ibn Ḥabib, who became his son-in-law, and Joseph Almosnino, later rabbi of Belgrade. Another son-in-law of his was Moses Ḥayyun, father of Nehemiah Hayyun. Another prominent student of his was Avraham Nathan ben Elisha Chaim Ashkenazi, renowned as Nathan of Gaza, who served as the prophet of Sabbatai Zevi.

Jacob Ḥagiz was active in the opposition to Sabbatai Zevi and put him under the ban.

About 1673, Ḥagiz went to Constantinople to publish his Leḥem ha-Panim (Hebrew: לחם הפנים, lit. 'Showbread'), but he died there before this was accomplished. This book, as well as many others of his, was lost. He also wrote:

- Teḥillat Ḥokhmah (Hebrew: תחלת חוכמה), on Talmudic methodology, published together with Samson of Chinon's Sefer Keritot (Verona, 1647; Amsterdam, 1709; Warsaw 1884 (without Sefer Keritot))
- Oraḥ Mishor (Hebrew: אורח מישור), on the conduct of rabbis (an appendix to the preceding work; 2d ed., with additions by Moses Ḥagiz, Amsterdam, 1709)
- Petil Tekhelet (Hebrew: פתיל תכלת), on the Azharot of Solomon Gabirol (Venice, 1652; 2d ed., London, 1714)
- Eẓ ha-Ḥayyim (Hebrew: עץ החיים), on the Mishnah (Livorno, 1654–55; 2d ed., Berlin, 1716)
- Ḥagiz also translated the Menorat ha-Ma'or of Isaac Aboab into Spanish (1656)
