= Joseph Almosnino =

Rabbi (1642–1689)

Joseph ben Isaac Almosnino (1642–1689) was a rabbi and scholar from a renowned Spanish rabbinic family. He was rabbi in Belgrade, and authored numerous responsa, collected by his son Isaac under the title Edut bi-Yehosef (Testimonies in Joseph) and published at Constantinople, 1711–33.

== Biography ==
Hailing from Salonica, he was the son of Isaac and grandson of Moses ben Baruch Almosnino. He began his studies at the academy of Hakham Jacob Hagiz in Jerusalem before relocating to Belgrade around 1666, where he succeeded his father-in-law as chief rabbi in 1668. Almosnino's tenure was marked by significant hardships, including a devastating fire that destroyed many of his writings, and the capture of the city by the Ottomans in 1688.

In response to the crisis, he traveled to Germany to fundraise for the ransom of escaping Jews captured by the Ottomans. He died at Nikolsburg, Moravia, in 1689.
