= Jonah Nabon =

Ottoman rabbi

- יונה נבון
- Born: 1713; Jerusalem, Ottoman Palestine
- Died: 1760 (aged 46–47); Jerusalem, Ottoman Palestine
- Occupation: Rabbi
- Known for: Talmudic and kabbalistic learning
- Notable work: Nechpah ba-Kesef; Get Mekushar
- Parent: Hanun Nabon

Jonah Nabon (Hebrew: יונה נבון) was a rabbinical scholar; born at Jerusalem in 1713; died there 1760; son of Hanun Nabon.

He was celebrated for his Talmudic and kabbalistic learning, and was the teacher of Chaim Joseph David Azulai (the Chida). Nabon wrote several works, of which only two have been published, namely:

- Nechpah ba-Kesef (vol. i, Constantinople, 1748; vol. ii, Jerusalem, 1843), responsa; and
- Get Mekushar, on divorce, in the form of a commentary on "Get Pashut," a work on the same subject by Moses ibn Habib.
