= Yaakov Culi =

Talmudist and biblical commentator (died 1732)

- יעקב כולי

Personal life
- Died: August 9, 1732 Constantinople, Ottoman Empire
- Notable works: Me'am Loez; Ezrat Nashim; Simanim le-Oraita
- Other names: Kuli, Kholi, Chuli
- Occupation: Talmudist, biblical commentator

Religious life
- Religion: Judaism

Rabbi Yaakov Culi (a.k.a. Kuli or Kholi or Chuli; Hebrew: יעקב כולי) was a Talmudist and biblical commentator of the seventeenth and eighteenth centuries who died in Constantinople on August 9, 1732. Rabbi Yaakov Kolli was born to his mother and father Hacham Makhir Kolli in the year 1685 in Jerusalem.

== Biography ==
He belonged to an exiled Spanish family, and was the grandson and pupil of Moses ibn Habib. He edited various important works. The first fruit of his literary activity was the publication of his grandfather's writings. To this end he left Safed, where he seemed to have lived, and relocated to Constantinople. While engaged on the works of his grandfather, he entered (1714) into close relations with the chief rabbi of Constantinople, Judah Rosanes (also known as Mishneh LaMelech, the title of his most important work), at the time generally regarded the highest authority of the Orient. Rosanes appointed Culi dayan, which, together with his position as teacher, secured to him a sufficient livelihood. In 1727 Culi published his grandfather's work Shammot ba-Aretz, a book of notes on various portions of the Talmud.

In that year Rosanes died. He left voluminous literary remains in a very chaotic condition. To introduce order into this chaos a scholar of the first rank was needed. Culi was entrusted with this task. But even for him it meant a labor of several years. First, in 1728, he edited Rosanes' book Parashat Derakhim, a work both midrashic and halachic in content. Three years later he finally published Rosanes' voluminous Mishneh laMelekh, one of the most famous commentaries on Maimonides' Mishne Torah, enriched with numerous important notes of his own. To both these works Culi wrote a preface.

In the same year, he edited also his grandfather's Ezrat Nashim, in the beginning of which there are two responsa of his own.

His most important work is his commentary on the Torah, entitled Me'am Loez, written in Salonika. This work, which is held in high regard by the Jews of the East, is a very elaborate encyclopedic commentary in Ladino, dealing with Jewish life in all its relations. Its material was taken from the Talmud, the Midrash, and early rabbinic literature. However, Rabbi Culi only managed to write his work on Genesis and on two-thirds of Exodus before he died. Because of the overwhelming popularity of the Me'am Loez, other prominent rabbis of Turkey took over this endeavor and completed the remaining volumes.

Culi also wrote a halakic work under the title Simanim le-Oraita, which remained in manuscript.
