= Moshe Galanti =

17th century Damascus-based rabbi/Kabalist

Moshe Galanti, a kabbalist, was the first Rishon LeZion (Sephardic chief Rabbi of Israel).

== Works ==
- Koheles Yaakov (1578), a commentary on Koheles
- Korban Chagiga
- Mafteach HaZohar (published in Venice)
