= Jacob bar Idi =

Rabbi Jacob bar Idi (Hebrew: רבי יעקב בר אידי, Rabbi Ya'akov bar Idi) was a second generation Amora sage of the Land of Israel, and one of the most prominent sages of his generation.

== Biography ==
He was the pupil of Joshua ben Levi, and resided at Tyre. The prominent sages Rav Nachman and Rav Zeira saw him in a special way, and whenever there were doubts concerning his studies they would send off a messenger to ask him about it, and he would refer to him as "Master". He is often cited together with R. Samuel ben Nahman.

== Teachings ==
He ruled that even though havdalah may be recited until Tuesday evening, the blessing on the havdalah candle may only be recited on Saturday night.
