= Me'am Lo'ez =

Book by Yaakov Culi

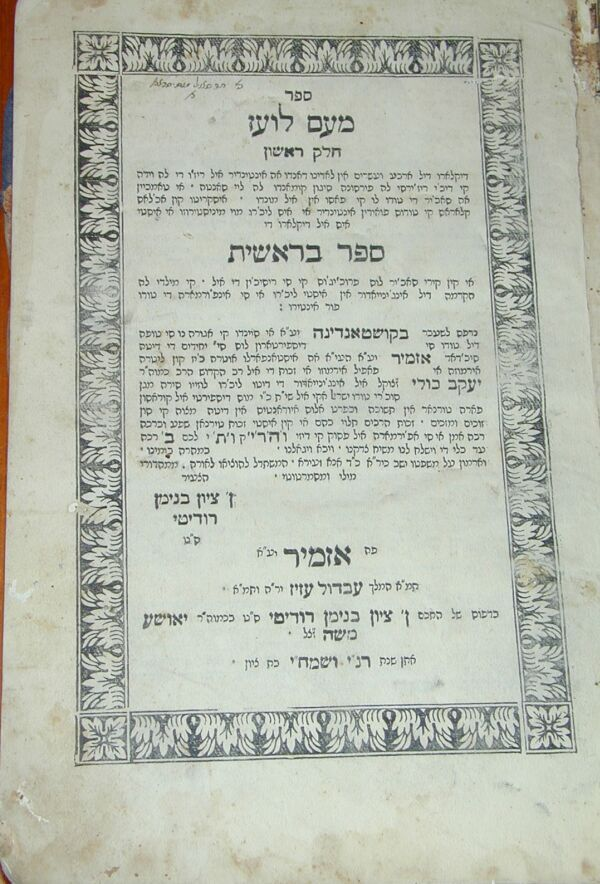
- Cover
- Author: Yaakov Culi; Yitzhak Magriso; Yitzhak Bechor Agruiti; Rachamim Menachem Mitrani; Raphael Chiyya Pontremoli; Shmeul Yerushalmi
- Translator: Shmeul Yerushalmi (Hebrew); Shmuel Kravitzer (Hebrew); Aryeh Kaplan (English); Gökhan Duran (Turkish)
- Language: Judaeo-Spanish
- Subject: Tanakh commentary
- Publication date: 1730–1777
- Publication place: Turkey

Me'am Lo'ez (Hebrew: מעם לועז), initiated by Rabbi Yaakov Culi in 1730, is a widely studied commentary on the Tanakh written in Judaeo-Spanish. It is perhaps the best known publication in that language.

== History ==
Me'Am Lo'ez marked one of the first major printings of Judaeo-Spanish text in the Ottoman Empire. Following the expulsion of Jews from Spain in 1492, many Sephardi Jews settled in the Ottoman Empire. These Jews brought with them their customs, culture and Judaeo-Spanish language. Hebrew remained the language of ritual, prayer and scholarship, but its comprehension by the Jewish masses had decreased. As time passed, many community leaders became concerned about the intellectual gap between the Jewish masses and their cultural leadership. This led several Jewish scholars to conclude that, in order to bring Judaism to the Jewish masses in the western Ottoman Empire, it should be done in their own language, Judaeo-Spanish, as educated men could read it, and it was written in Hebrew script. This major initiative was launched in 1730 with the printing of the first volume of Me'Am Lo'ez, which was to be a thorough commentary on the Bible in Judaeo-Spanish. The printing of Me'Am Lo'ez marked the emergence of large scale printing activity in Judaeo-Spanish in the western Ottoman Empire in general and in Constantinople in particular.

== Content ==
In Rabbi Culi's time, many individuals in Turkey were not sufficiently fluent in the Hebrew language to study the Torah and its commentaries in the original. Rabbi Culi thus undertook the "colossal task" of writing a compendium of the major fields of Torah study. The commentary was to be user-friendly and was thus written in Judaeo-Spanish, the Jewish language spoken by the Sephardic Jews in Turkey, as most Sephardic Jews could no longer read Hebrew. The title of the work comes from the first line of Psalm 114, where "Me'am Lo'ez" means "strange language".

The book was divided according to the weekly Torah portion (Parashat hashevua); Rabbi Culi explains each chapter in detail according to the Midrash and Talmud, as well as discussing the relevant Halacha as based on the Shulchan Aruch and Mishneh Torah. In his introduction Rabbi Culi personally guarantees that "everyone who reads the Me'am Loez every day will be able to answer in Heaven that he has learned the whole Torah, because all aspects of the Torah are covered on it".

== Authorship ==
While Rabbi Culi died only two years later after completing the Book of Genesis and 2/3 of Exodus, due to its mass popularity—and the extensive notes already written by Rabbi Culi—a decision was taken to complete the commentaries. Rabbi Yitzhak Magriso completed Exodus, and wrote the commentary on the books of Leviticus and Numbers. Deuteronomy was done by Rabbi Yitzhak Bechor Agruiti. The commentary on Joshua was written by Rabbi Rachamim Menachem Mitrani. The Book of Esther was done by Rabbi Raphael Chiyya Pontremoli. Rabbi Shmuel Yerushalmi translated the works into Hebrew, although greatly deviated from the originals on their Nach commentaries and the book of Avoth. He also continued the Meam Loez work in Hebrew on many of the books of Nach that the sages before him did not write.

== Translations ==
The Me'am Loez quickly became extremely popular in the Jewish communities of Turkey, Spain, Morocco and Egypt. With the decline of Judaeo-Spanish after the Holocaust, various translations were produced, and the work can still be found in many Orthodox synagogues to this day. In 1967, a Hebrew translation, Yalkut Me'am Lo'ez, was produced by Rabbi Shmuel Kravitzer. The first English translation, the Torah Anthology, was written (primarily) by Rabbi Aryeh Kaplan. This translation made use of both Yerushalmi's Hebrew translation as well as Judaeo-Spanish manuscripts—which Kaplan checked against Yerushalmi's translation. The resulting work introduced Me'am Lo'ez to the broader Ashkenazi world.

In 1964, Gonzalo Maeso and Pascual Recuero, two Catholic scholars, from the University of Granada produced a modern Spanish printing. Their printing received criticism for the authors lack of knowledge in Turkish and Judaeo-Spanish, resulting "in an edition filled with inaccuracies".

In 2000, Pilar Romeu published a critical edition of the indexes with a concordance and analysis. Another Spanish scholar, Rosa Asenjo, published a translation of the Song of Songs (Šir ha-širim) volume authored by Hayim Y. Šakí (Constantinople, 1899).
