= Pontremoli (disambiguation) =

Pontremoli is a small city in the north of Tuscany in Italy.

Pontremoli may also refer to:

== People ==
- Aldo Pontremoli, Italian physicist
- Esdra Pontremoli, Italian poet, editor, rabbi.
- Benjamin Pontremoli, Turkish poet and rabbi
- Raphael Chiyya Pontremoli, Turkish poet and rabbi
- Hiyya Pontremoli, Turkish poet and rabbi
- Roberto Pontremoli, Italian insurer and entrepreneur
