= Alatri (surname) =

Alatri is a surname. Notable people with the surname include:

- Crescenzo Alatri (1825–1897), Italian writer
- Giacomo Alatri (1833–1889), Italian banker and philanthropist
- Goffredo da Alatri (died 1287), Italian nobleman and Roman Catholic cardinal
- Paolo Alatri (1918– 1995), Italian historian and Marxist politician
- Samuel Alatri (1805–1889), Italian politician, communal worker, and orator
