= Eliseo Pontremoli =

Eliseo Graziadio Pontremoli (Hebrew: אליזו גרוזידיו פונטרמולי; Casale Monferrato, September 15, 1778 - Nice, August 21, 1851) was a Hebrew scholar, biblical exegete, writer, poet, professor, rabbi, intellectual, philosopher, translator, judge, diplomat, and Italian civil servant, and was Grand Rabbi and head of the Jewish community of Nice.

He was one of the leading Italian supporters of the "anti-Caraite" current along with Isaac Samuel Reggio and Avraham Cologna. With the latter he is considered one of the most distinguished representatives of the Italian rabbinate in the 18th century.

== Early years ==
Eliseo Graziado Pontremoli was born in 1778 to Ezra Pontremoli (born in Casale Monferrato on March 10, 1736, and died in Casale Monferrato on December 6, 1816), a merchant and banker, and to Rachele Pescarolo. He grew up in a distinguished Casale family, whose origins date back to the 15th century, to which distinguished Italian and Turkish rabbis belonged, including Gabriel Pontremoli, Hiyya Pontremoli and Benjamin Pontremoli. His father, although not himself a rabbi, encouraged his son's decision to pursue a religious education rather than pursue a business career, as apparently seemed to be Elisha's first inclination.

== Chief Rabbi ==
On December 17, 1799, he was appointed chief rabbi of the Ivrea community, succeeding Rabbi Salomon Levi Foà of Modena. During his stay in Ivrea he translated and popularized the main Jacobin writings, and then dedicated a poem to Napoleon Bonaparte, demonstrating the Jewish community's support for Napoleon's reforms. In 1809 he married Bella Mazal Tov Olivetti, niece of Laudadio Formiggini and a member of a prominent Jewish family from which Camillo Olivetti also originated. In 1814 Eliseo moved to Chieri, near the Savoy capital, where many of his relatives already resided. That same year he was appointed chief rabbi of Chieri, and he began to participate in the Academy of the Restless established there in the early nineteenth century. Several of his sons were born there, including the well-known rabbi Ezra Pontremoli and the official portrait painter of the Savoy family, Raffaele Pontremoli. He held this position until 1833.

In 1833 he was promoted to Grand Rabbi of Nice, where there was one of the most fervent Jewish communities. He had to replace the controversial figure of Abraham Belaish (1773-1853), who because of certain affairs had brought the Jewish community of Nice into disrepute. During this period he also had to clash with representatives of the secular Jewish community who wanted to take away the decision-making power and economic recognition that was given to the chief rabbi.

During his rabbinic career he also served as a diplomat and judge, which earned him the nicknames "Le bon Pontremoli" and "Monsieur le grand rabbin." A great supporter of Moses Mendelssohn's Jewish Enlightenment current, he wrote hundreds of works, which were later collected by the noted Hebraist Moritz Steinschneider in the late 19th century.

He died on August 21, 1851, in Nice. In September 1851, at the suggestion of French Interior Minister Léon Faucher, a street in central Nice, now renamed "Rue Georges Ville," was named after him.

Many of his works are held in public archives and private collections in Oxford, New York, Hamburg, Frankfurt, Paris and Moscow.

== Selected works ==
- Eliseo Pontremoli: "Sonetto nelle nuziali festivita del Jacob Vitale d'Alessandria colla Eva Levi di Vercelli", 1799, Ivrea;
- Eliseo Pontremoli: "Dissertazione e diffesa della legge orale, ossia tradizione", 1843, Nizza;
- Eliseo Pontremoli: "Tiqwat Yesharim ve-Sheerit Nefesh", 1837, Nizza. Con traduzione e commento in ebraico dei testi di Jean Racine e Francesco Petrarca;
- Eliseo Pontremoli: "Sonetto nelle nuziali festivita del Jacob Vitale d'Alessandria colla Eva Levi di Vercelli", 1799, Ivrea;
- Solomon Pappenheim, traduzione in ebraico del Rav. Eliseo Pontremoli: "Shishit Ha-Efa", 1813, Ivrea;
- Paul Henri Thiry d'Holbach, traduzione in ebraico del Rav. Eliseo Pontremoli: "Il cristianesimo svelato. Analisi dei principi e degli effetti della religione cristiana", 1847, Nizza.

== Acknowledgements ==
- Intitolazione di una via in suo onore a Nizza: "Avenue Elisee Pontremoli". Nel decreto del presidente francese Marie François Sadi Carnot e del ministro Ernest Constans il Pontremoli viene celebrato per le iniziative di cui si fece carico per servire la societá durante l'epidemia di colera. Viene in tal senso accostato per nobiltà ed eroismo alle figure di Henri-François-Xavier de Belzunce de Castelmoron e di Chevalier Roze.

== Bibliography ==
- Asher Salah, Judaism as a moral theology, the figure of Helisha Pontremoli, 2008
- Italia Judaica, Gli Ebrei nell'Italia Unita
- «Esdra Pontremoli». In: Jewish Encyclopedia, Vol. XIX, 1888 Isidore Singer (on-line)
- "Les Pontremoli, deux dynasties rabbiniques en Turquie et en Italie" Parigi,1997
- Diplomatici e personalità ebraiche a San Marino (XIX-prima metà XX sec.) Di Cristina Ravara Montebelli
- Biblioteche civiche di Torino
- Eliseo Pontremoli in: "National Library of Israel"

== See also ==
- History of the Jews in Italy
- Jewish Renewal
