= Soave =

Soave may refer to:

- Soave, Veneto, comune in Veneto region, Italy
- Soave (wine), a dry white wine from Veneto region
- Moses Soave (1820–1882), Italian Hebraist
- Robby Soave, American libertarian author and journalist
