= L'Educatore Israelita =

One of the first Jewish newspapers in Italy

- Type: Monthly
- Founder: Giuseppe Levi Esdra Pontremoli
- Founded: 1853
- Ceased publication: 1921
- City: Vercelli (1853–74); Casale (1875–1921)
- Country: Italy

L'Educatore Israelita (lit. 'The Israelite Educator'), known as Il Vessillo Israelitico (lit. 'The Israelite Banner') after 1874, was one of the first Jewish newspapers in Italy. The monthly periodical was founded in 1853 by Giuseppe Levi and Esdra Pontremoli.

== History ==
L'Educatore Israelita was founded by Giuseppe Levi in 1853, who published the newspaper in conjunction with Esdra Pontremoli. It advocated moderate Jewish reform, to be brought about by the co-operation of all communities. S. D. Luzzatto, Lelio Della Torre, Lelio Cantoni, Crescenzo Altari, Marco Mortara, and Elia Benamozegh were among its contributors.

After Levi's death in 1874 the periodical was continued in Casale by Flaminio Servi under the title Il Vessillo Israelitico ('The Israelite Banner'). During the early years of its existence under this title it contained essays from the pens of such men as Abraham Berliner, Salvatore De Benedetti, Pietro Perreau, Moses Soave, and Moritz Steinschneider; but later its importance as a literary and scientific journal deteriorated.

Flaminio Servi died in 1904, and was succeeded by his son Ferruccio.
