= Eugenia Pavia Gentilomo Fortis =

Italian poet and translator (1822 - 1893)

- Born: Eugenia Pavia; 4 January 1822; Milan, Kingdom of Lombardy–Venetia
- Died: 30 December 1893 (aged 71); Asolo, Kingdom of Italy
- Spouses: Giuseppe Gentilomo (m. 1839; died 1844); Leone Fortis (m. 1853)
- Writing career
- Language: Italian
- Genre: Poetry

Eugenia Pavia Gentilomo Fortis (4 January 1822 – 30 December 1893) was an Italian Jewish poet and translator.

== Biography ==
Eugenia Pavia was born in Milan to Regina Capriles and Salomon Pavia, a Jewish Sardinian court jeweler, whom she accompanied on his travels in Italy, France, and Switzerland. She received literary training from Egidio De Magri and Giuseppe Sacchi, and was later mentored by poet Luigi Carrer. Pavia married Giuseppe Gentilomo of Venice in 1839 at the age of 17.

Beginning in the 1840s, Pavia composed a number of biblical idylls, including poems on Rebecca and Jacob, and a series of Davidic psalms in sestine. In 1842 she published "Venezia e Firenze", an ode to Venice and Florence. In 1847, after the death of her husband in March 1844, she published her best-known poem, "Nicaule", which describes in versi sciolti the visit of the Queen of Sheba to Solomon. Her collection Nuove Poesie, dedicated to Carrer, was released in 1851.

Pavia enjoyed high esteem among the Venetian intelligentsia. Pavia married prominent lawyer Leone Fortis on 10 December 1856. That same year, she became the first female member of the Ateneo Veneto learned society. She contributed verses on Hebrew subjects to the Annuario of Flaminio Servi for AM 5634 (1873), and in 1886 published Alla memoria di Leone Fortis, a volume of unpublished poetry composed after her second husband's death.
