= Albert Pontremoli =

M.Albert Pontremoli

Personal details
- Profession: Judge, lawyer, magistrate

Albert Pontremoli, also known as M. Albert Pontremoli, (Nice, 1862 - Paris, 1923), was a French art collector, lawyer and magistrate of Italian origin.

== Biography ==
Albert Pontremoli was born in Nice to Eleonora Pontremoli (born in Nice in 1839 and died in Paris in 1890), daughter of the Grand Rabbi of Nice Eliseo Pontremoli, and Salvador Pontremoli (born in 1814 and died in 1882). His sister, Rebecca, was married to French official Gaston Moch, from whom she had the well-known politician Jules Moch. On his mother's side he was a first cousin of Emmanuel Pontremoli, Pio Pontremoli and Enrico Pontremoli.

After studying law, he began working as a lawyer. He later joined the French Court of Appeal where he would work for part of his career, ending it at the French Ministry of the Navy.

== Art collector ==
He was particularly interested in Impressionist painting, under the influence of his cousins Emmanuel and Albert Hecht. He personally got to know some impressionist painters such as Édouard Manet.

His private collection, one of the most comprehensive, included works by the most important exponents of Impressionism including Camille Pissarro, Pierre-Auguste Renoir, Claude Monet, Camille Claudel, Eugène Boudin as well as Eugène Delacroix, Eugène Carrière. Following his death in late 1923 in Paris, his heirs auctioned off his entire large private collection. The sale was divided into three sessions: two in Paris, in July and November 1924, and one in London, in December of the same year.

== Collection M.Albert Pontremoli ==
=== Delacroix ===
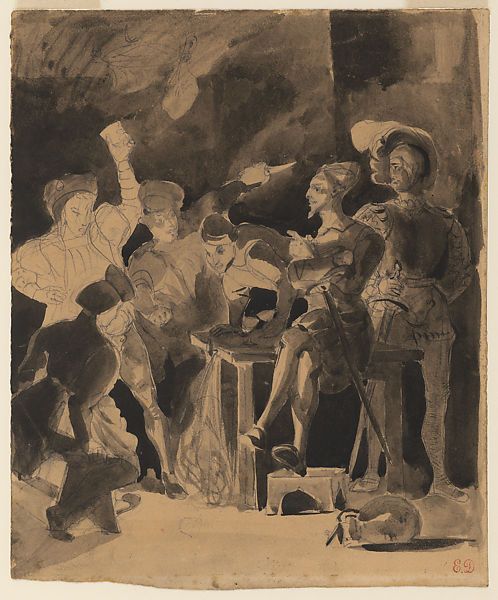
Faust e Mefistole nella locanda 7

- Faust e Mefistofele nella locanda, Eugène Delacroix nel 1825 attualmente presso Houghton Library, Harvard Usa.
- Faust, Margherita e Mefistofele in strada, Eugène Delacroix nel 1825 attualmente presso Houghton Library, Harvard Usa.

=== Jacques De Saint-Aubin ===
- Traces d'une silhouette d'homme de profil, Gabriel-Jacques De Saint-Aubin nel 1864.

=== Boudin ===
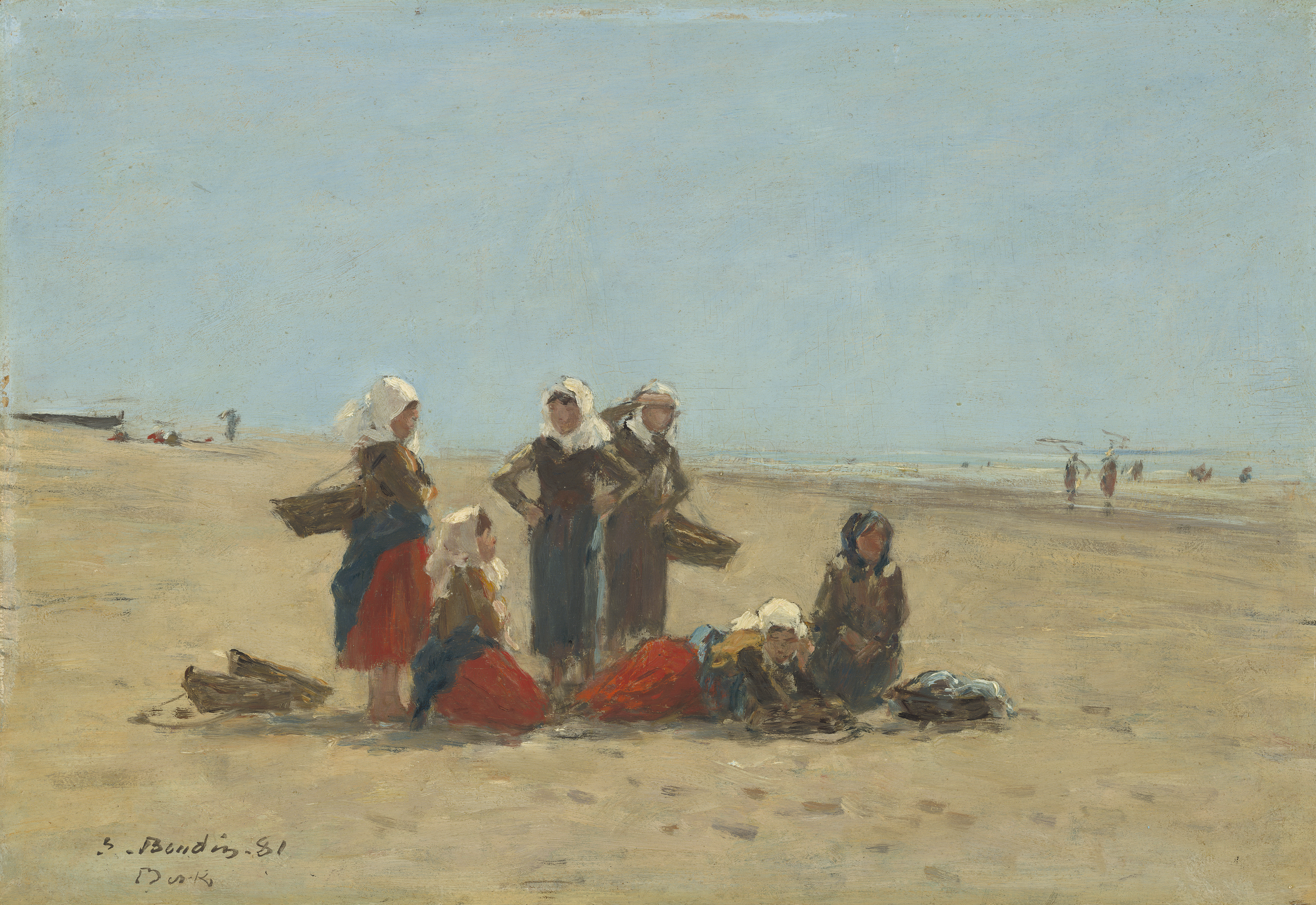
Donne sulla spiaggia di Berck

- Donne sulla spiaggia di Berck, 1881 Eugène Boudin, currently at the National Gallery of Art.

=== Renoir ===
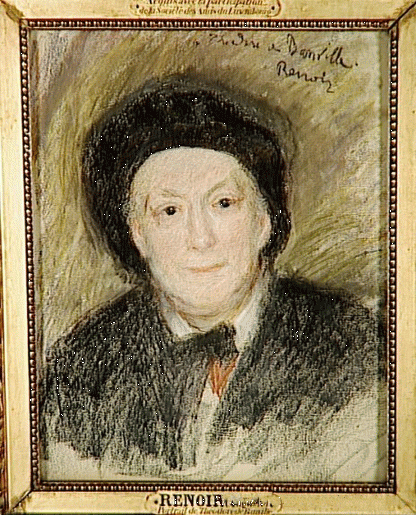
Portrait de Théodore de Banville

- Ritratto di Théodore de Banville, 1882 Pierre-Auguste Renoir currently at the Parigi Museo d'Orsay.

=== Rodin ===
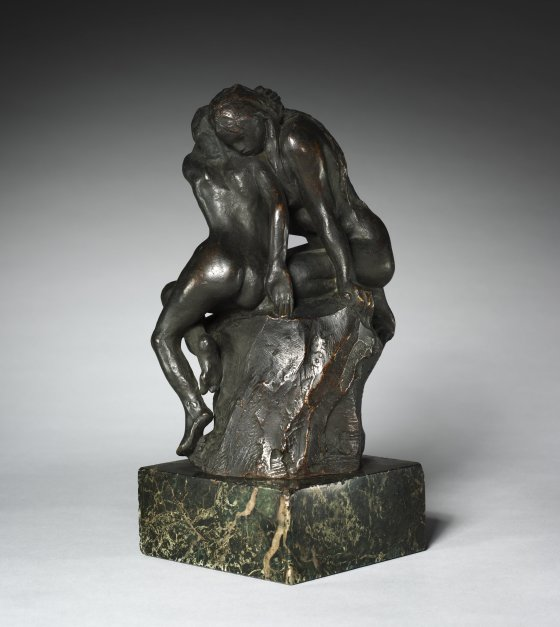
Giovane Ragazza che confida il suo segreto ad Iside

- Young Girl Confiding Her Secret to Isis (Jeune fille confiant son secret à Isis) 1899 Auguste Rodin currently at the Cleveland Museum of Art.
- Ugolin, Auguste Rodin nel 1881.
- Il genio buono, Auguste Rodin nel 1890 currently in a private collection in New York.

=== Pissarro ===
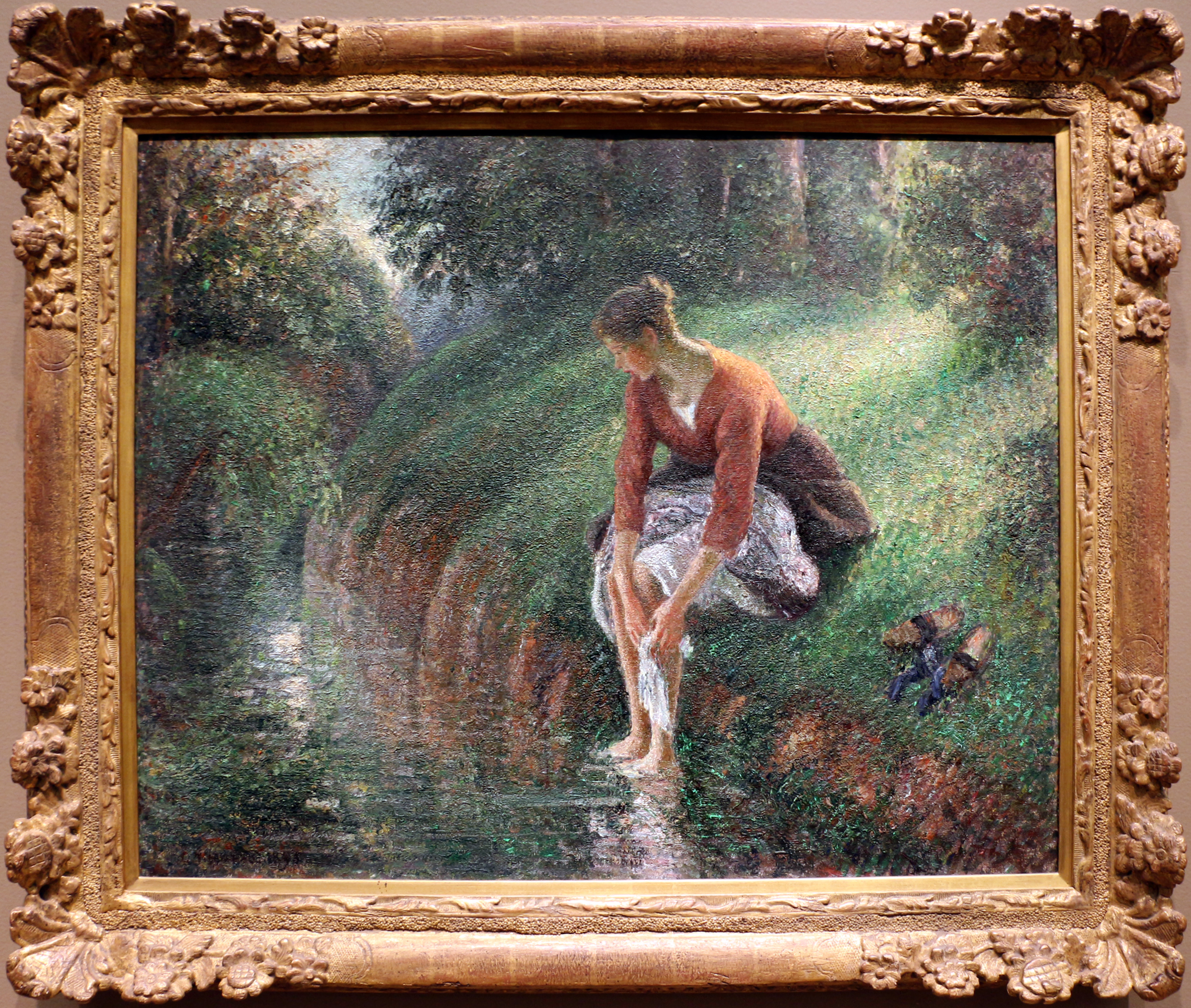
Donna che si bagna i piedi in un ruscello

- Woman Bathing Her Feet in a Brook Camille Pissarro 1894 currently at the Art Institute of Chicago.

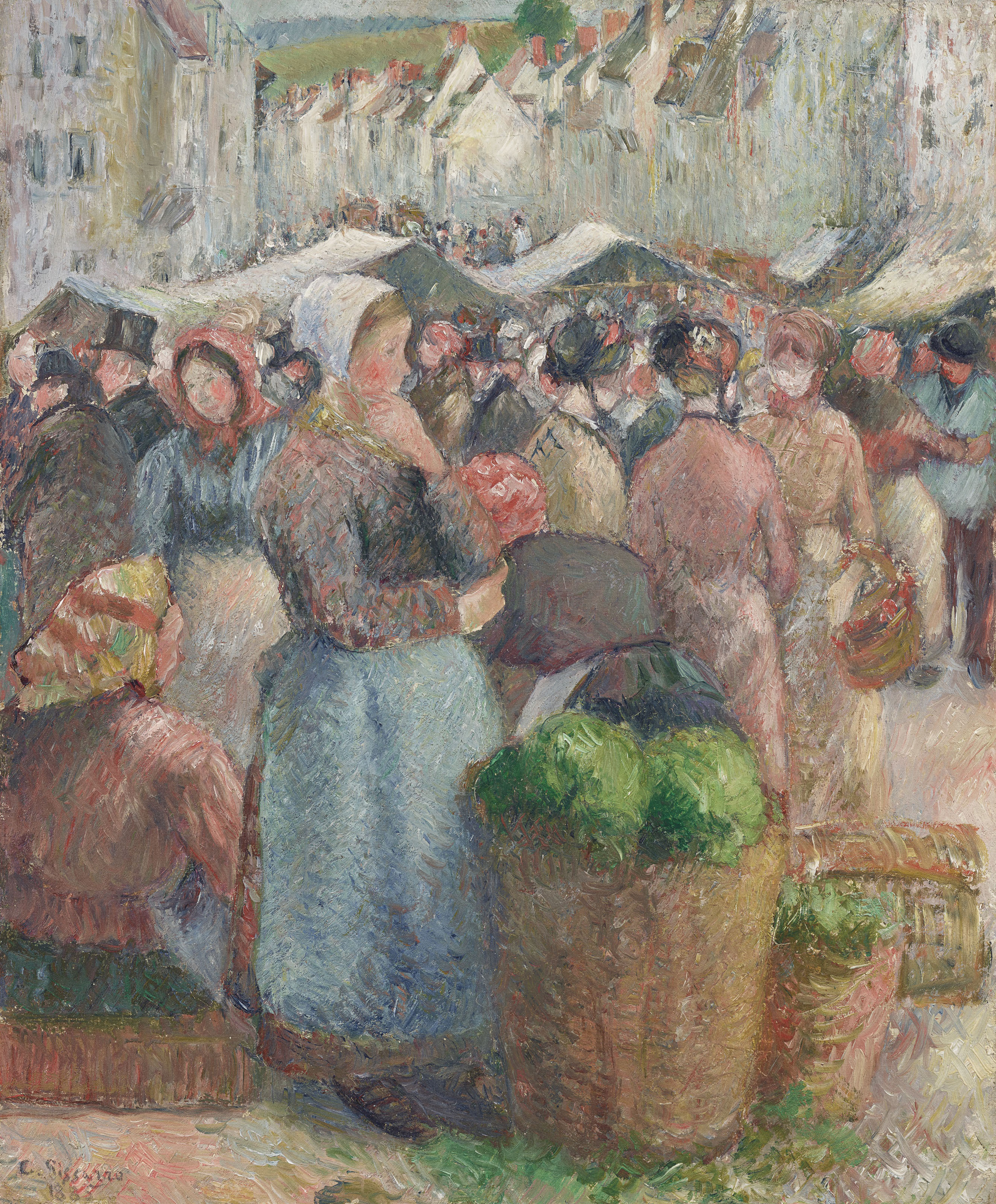
Il mercato di Gisors Grande Via

- Il mercato di Gisors gran via, Camille Pissarro nel 1885.

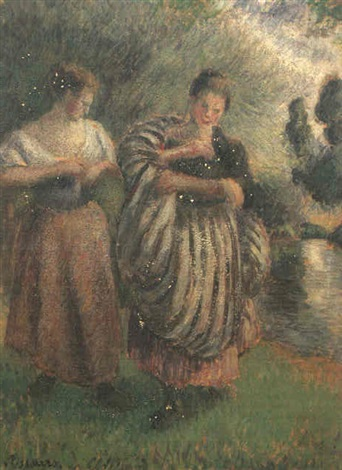
Après le bain eseguito da Camille Pissarro

- Après le bain, Camille Pissarro nel 1881.

== Bibliography ==
- Albert Pontremoli, Galleria Nazionale degli Stati Uniti d'America
