= INA Assitalia =

INA Assitalia S.p.A.
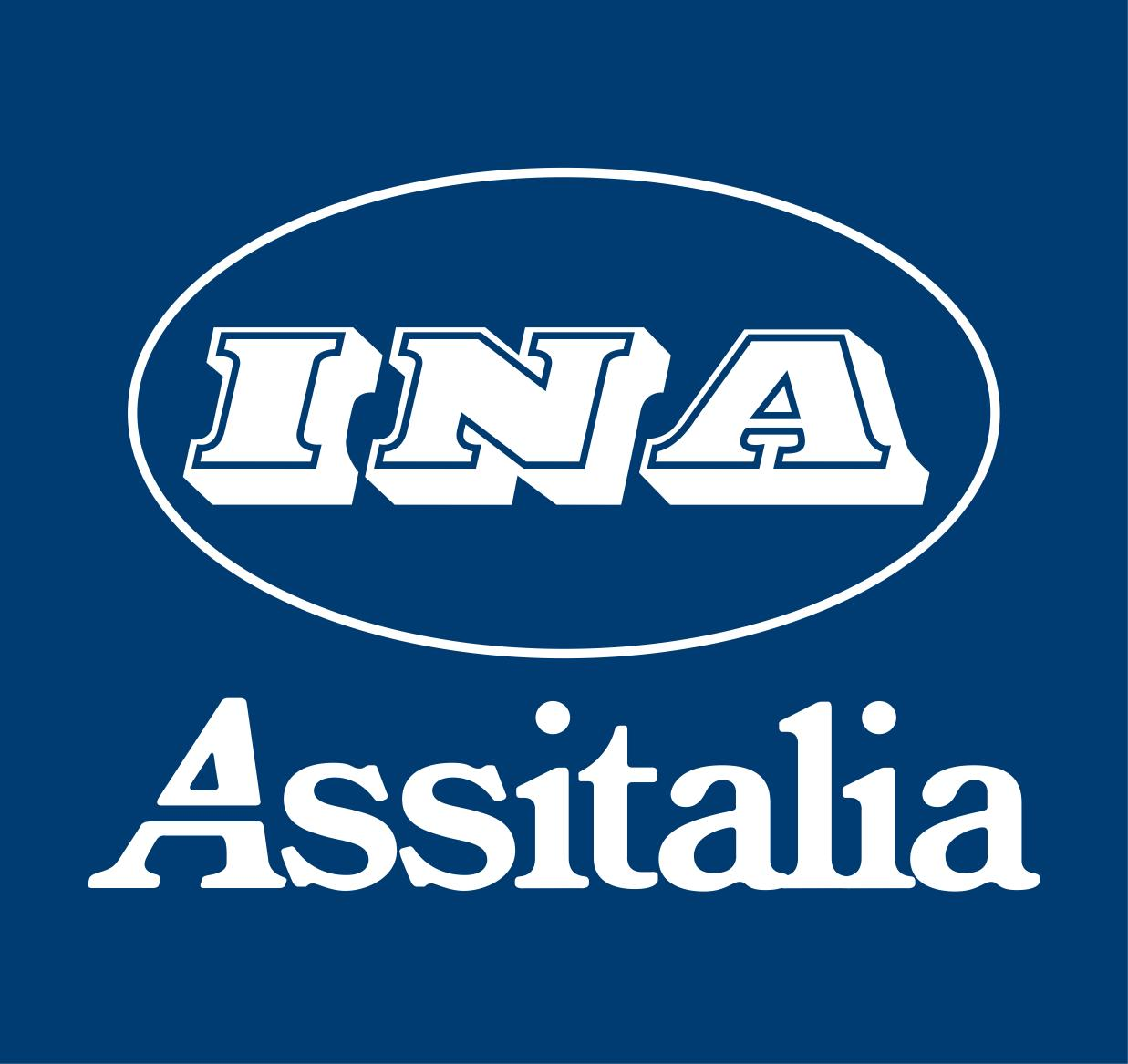
- Type: State owned company società per azioni
- Industry: Insurance
- Predecessor: Istituto Nazionale delle Assicurazioni
- Founded: 1923 Rome, Italy
- Founder: Italian government
- Defunct: July 1, 2013
- Fate: Merged
- Successor: Generali Italia
- Headquarters: Rome, Italy
- Area served: Italy
- Products: General insurance

INA Assitalia was an Italian insurance company, operating on the Italian market from 1912 to 2013. In the last years it belonged to the Assicurazioni Generali group.

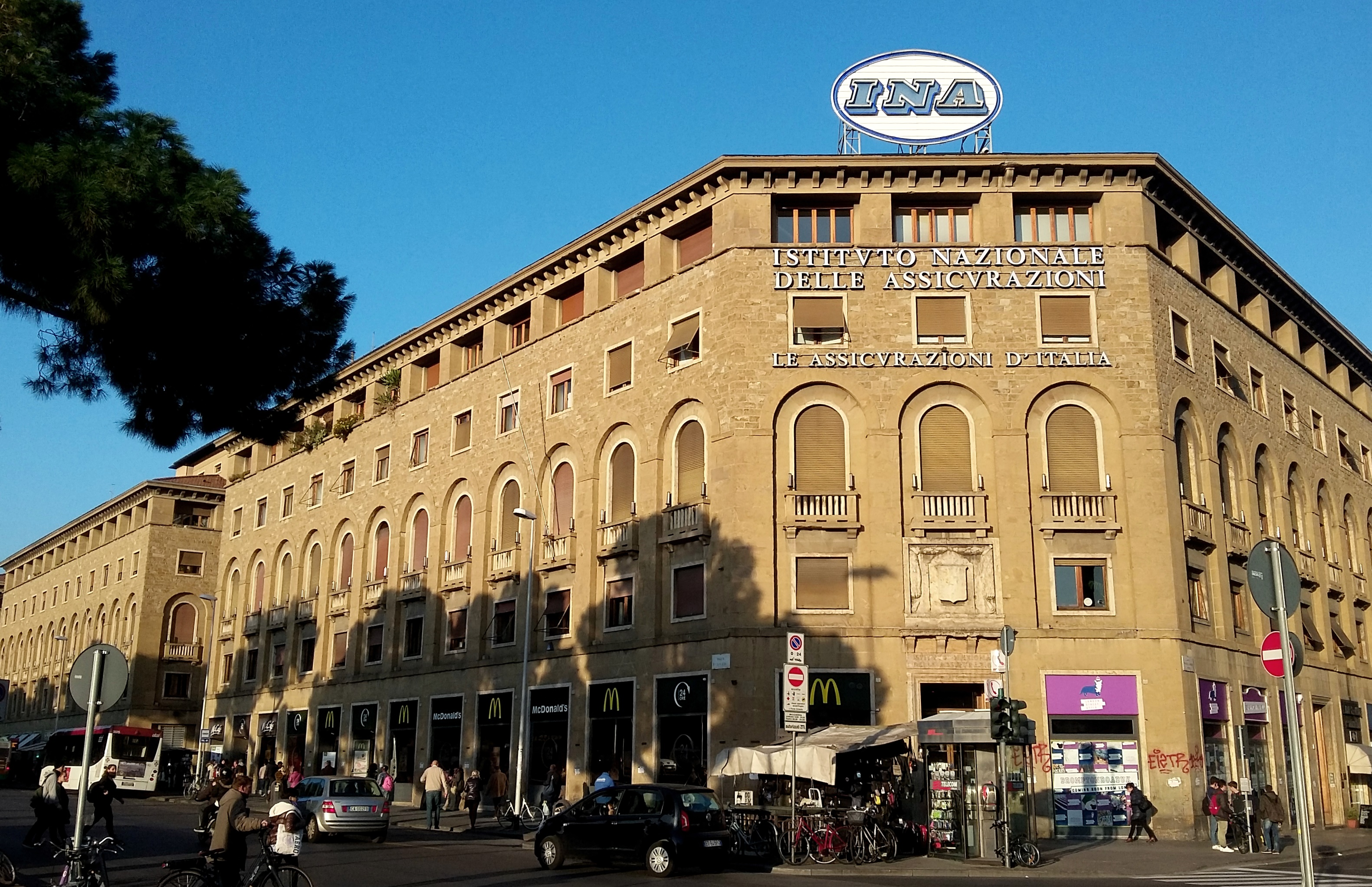
Istituto Nazionale delle Assicurazioni, Florence

== History ==
INA, Istituto Nazionale delle Assicurazioni, was a public entity specialized in the Italian monopoly of life insurance; it was established by a decree of the minister Francesco Saverio Nitti in 1912.

On 25 July 1923, Assitalia (Le Assicurazioni d'Italia, Società Anonima) was founded to deal with the non-life branch. Half of Assitalia's share capital was owned by INA and half by various private insurance groups.

In 1927 the INA took over the entire share package of Assitalia.

In 1992 the italian government transformed the public entity that manages the INA into a società per azioni with the aim of privatizing the company.

The privatization process began in 1994, with a public sale offer and with the placement of approximately 48% of the shares making up the share capital of INA s.p.a. In 1996 the privatization process ended with the sale of the last 31% of the share capital still held by the italian Ministry of Treasury.

On 31 December 2006, Generali merged the companies INA and Assitalia (of which INA has in the meantime become the sole shareholder) into a single company: INA Assitalia S.p.A.

As a result of the corporate reorganization, wanted by the CEO Mario Greco, on 1 July 2013 the Italian insurance activities of Assicurazioni Generali are incorporated into INA Assitalia; the latter in turn changes its name to Generali Italia S.p.A. and moves the registered office from Rome to Mogliano Veneto.

== Buildings ==
INA built many palaces and buildings in Italy. Most are in the Novecento style, an Italian art movement born in Milan at the end of 1922. Some are excellent examples of the rationalist style. Other INA buildings were instead built after the war, in spaces that remained free, once the rubble caused by the bombing had been eliminated. Temporary buildings, created at annual fairs, have been lost.

== Archive ==
The establishment of the INA Historical Archive was deliberated in April 1961 on the occasion of the celebrations for the fiftieth anniversary of the birth of the Institute. Following the privatization of the Institute, on 21 November 1992, the Archival Superintendency for Lazio declared all the documentary production of the INA to be of considerable historical interest. Housed at the headquarters of the institute in via Bissolati in Rome, the historical archive includes, among other things, the Storico Immobiliare fund (historical real estate fund), whose documentation reflects all the building activity of the public entity since its establishment, a fund relating to the INA-Casa management and two funds containing the papers produced, received and used in the course of the activity carried out at INA by Bonaldo Stringher and Alberto Beneduce.

== See also ==
- Roberto Pontremoli
- Torrione INA
