= Crescenzo Alatri =

Italian writer and rabbi (1825–1897)

- Born: 1825; Rome, Papal States
- Died: 12 February 1897 (aged 71–72)
- Occupation: Writer
- Relatives: Samuel Alatri
- Writing career
- Period: fl. 1856–1870
- Genre: History nonfiction
- Subject: Italian Jewry
- Notable work: History of the Jews in Rome

Crescenzo Alatri (1825 – 12 February 1897) was an Italian-Jewish writer most well-known for his publication of "History of the Jews in Rome."

== Biography ==
Born in Rome, Alatri was educated in the Talmud Torah of his native city, the Universita' Israelitica di Roma, and graduated as a rabbi. Later in his life following graduation, he was appointed secretary counselor and remained involved as an educator along with his relative Samuel.

He was the author of "History of the Jews in Rome," several extracts of which were published in the Educatore Israelita (1856). He is widely recognized for his Italian and French translator of Israel Moses Hazan's Hebrew poems, and as one of the founders of the Società di Fratellanza, a Jewish philanthropic organization dedicated to youth education and the promotion of artisanship among Italian Jewry.

Alatri was active in the Italian-Jewish community and was a supporter of traditional Jewish education, similar to the one he had growing up. He was described in an obituary as "the most active and authoritative collaborator of the late Samuel Alatri in the struggle sustained until 1870 for the improvement of the fate of the Jew of the Papal States..."

He died on 12 February 1897 after a long illness.
