= Tower of San Martino della Battaglia =

Italian monument

The Tower of San Martino della Battaglia is a monumental building erected in 1878, to commemorate the Battle of San Martino, a portion of the Battle of Solferino in 1859, located near San Martino, province of Brescia, region of Lombardy, Italy.

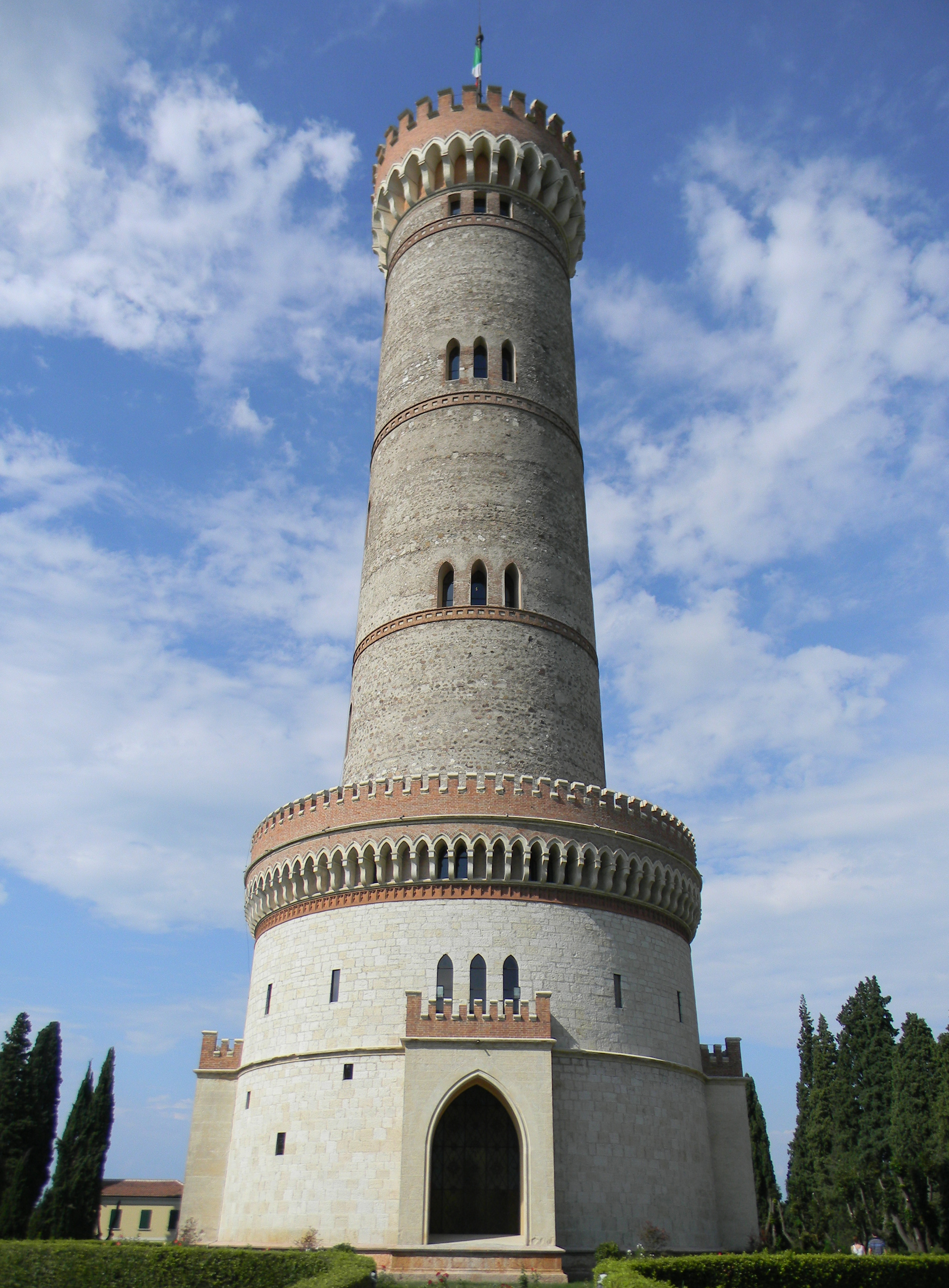
Tower of San Martino della Battaglia

The 74 meter high tower was constructed in the form of a Neo-Gothic turret, atop the hill of San Martino. Nearby is an Ossuary that collected the bodies of soldiers who died in the battle there between the Austrian and the Piedmontese army. The larger engagement, which also included French troops, led to the cession of Lombardy to the Kingdom of Sardinia (Piedmont). The Battle of Solferino took place near the villages of Solferino and San Martino della Battaglia in Lombardy, south of Lake Garda between Milan and Verona. The adjoint Battle of San Martino was fought north from Solferino, near the lakeshore, between San Martino and Pozzolengo villages.

The architect was Giacomo Frizzoni of Bergamo, and engineers were Luigi Fattori of Solferino, Antonio Monterumici of Treviso, and Ducati Cavalieri of Bologna. At the hall at the base is a bronze statue of Vittorio Emanuele II sculpted by Antonio Dal Zotto. The walls have large frescoes by Vittorio Bressanin of Venice, but also Vincenzo De Stefani (born in Verona, March 6, 1859), Alberti Giuseppe Vizzotto of Oderzo, and Raffaello Pontremoli, with panels depicting events surrounding the battle. The tower can be ascended by a spiraling ramp. At the top of the tower there is a lookout panel highlighting important towns that can be viewed from that vantage point.

The architecture seems to have been influenced by the Neoclassic marble tower built in the Cemetery of Brescia in 1815 by the architect Rodolfo Vantini; however, this monument in hewn stone projects a rustic gothic castle appearance.

== Sources ==
- City of Desenzano del Garda, website on tower.
- Società Solferino e San Martino.
