= Lelio Cantoni =

Italian rabbi (1802–1857)

Rabbi Lelio Cantoni
- Title: Chief Rabbi

Personal life
- Born: 1802 Gazzuolo, Department of the Mincio, Italian Republic
- Died: 18 January 1857 (aged 54–55) Turin, Kingdom of Sardinia
- Education: Istituto Rabbinico at Padua

Religious life
- Religion: Judaism

Jewish leader
- Main work: Nuovo Ordinamento del Culto Israelitico nes Regi Stati
- Other: Chief rabbi of Turin, advocate for Jewish emancipation and internal administration

Lelio Cantoni (1802 – 18 January 1857) was an Italian rabbi who served as the chief rabbi of Turin from 1833 until his death.

== Early life and education ==
Lelio Cantoni was born in Gazzuolo, Duchy of Mantua. In 1829, he enrolled at the newly established Istituto Rabbinico at Padua, graduating as a rabbi in 1832. After completing his studies, he was commissioned by the government to draft statutes concerning Jewish communities.

== Career ==
In 1845, Cantoni formed the Committee of the Jewish Communities of the Kingdom of Sardinia and Piedmont, which gained him the support of Massimo d'Azeglio and Roberto d'Azeglio.

In 1848 war broke out with Austria and Cantoni recruited among Turin's Jews and organized volunteers into three battalions of sharpshooters to fight for Piedmont-Sardinia.

He advocated for the emancipation of Jews in the Kingdom of Sardinia which helped to bring it about in the Constitution of 1848, a development that later extended to united Italy. Following the emancipation of Jews in the Kingdom of Sardinia in 1848, Cantoni worked on organizing the internal administration of Jewish religious matters. He published his Nuovo Ordinamento del Culto Israelitico ne' Registrati, in which he proposed the establishment of consistories by the government and outlined means of supporting them.

Cantoni had contributed to Educatore Israelita and Archives Israélites. He supported initiatives to establish asylums for children as well as contributing to the founding of schools and societies in Turin.

== Death ==
He had intended to create an organization which was to include Jewish communities and rabbis across Italy, however he died on 18 January 1857 in Turin before this could be realised.
