= Vittorio Emanuele Bressanin =

Italian painter

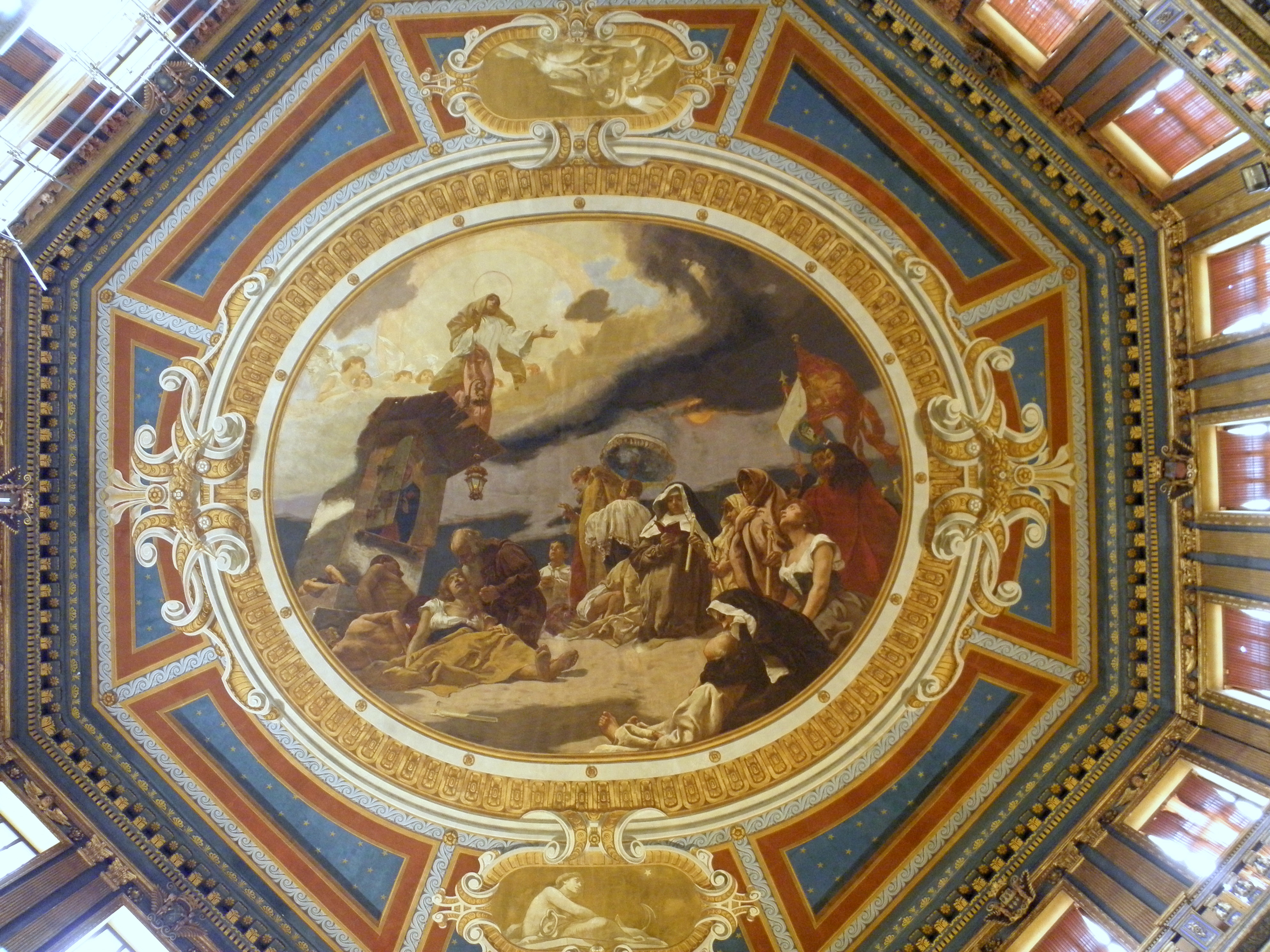
Church of Madonna del Soccorso (La Rotonda), Rovigo

Vittorio Emanuele Bressanin (November 22, 1860 – August 16, 1941) was an Italian painter.

== Biography ==
He was born in Musile di Piave. He moved to study at the Academy of Fine Arts in Venice under Pompeo Molmenti, and soon became instructor at the academy, working with colleagues such as Ettore Tito, Ludovico Cadorin, and Emilio Paggiato. He exhibited works at the Biennale of Venice in 1897, 1899, 1901, 1905, and 1922. among his early prize winning works were L'ultimo senato in 1887, and Fuoco Spento (awarded Prince Umberto Prize in 1894 at Milan).

In 1887, he was commissioned to paint the ceiling of the Church of Madonna del Soccorso (La Rotonda) of Rovigo. He painted the Theological virtues: Faith, Hope and Charity. For the latter, he painted a scene of intercession for those afflicted with the plague. He also painted in 1899–1900, along with Vincenzo De Stefani, the lunettes of a chapel in the Sanctuary of Monte Berico in Vicenza. He painted Christianity and Heresy now found in the Art Museum of Ravenna. In 1890, he also painted the walls of the parish church of Santi Francesco e Giustina in Rovigo, depicting St Francis before Pope Honorius III and the Martyrdom of Saint Giustina. He painted altarpieces for the churches of San Marco in Rovereto; and the church in Casale di Scodosia.

He also painted many costume genre subjects, of individuals in gallant poses and antique elaborate attire. His Ore liete is a genre work painted in 1886. Bressanin also painted sweeping historic and battle frescoes for the walls of the Tower of San Martino della Battaglia.

Bressanin died in 1941 in Venice.
