= Esdra Pontremoli =

Italian poet and rabbi

Chakam Esdra Pontremoli Cavaliere della Corona Italiana
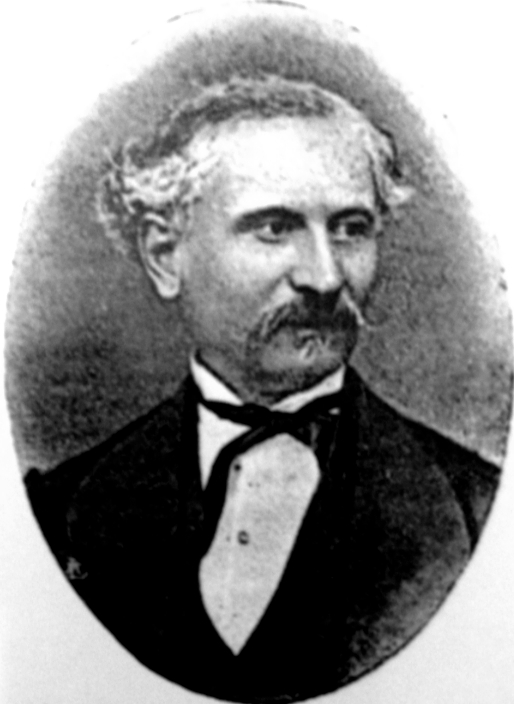
- Title: Prof. Esdra Pontremoli

Personal life
- Born: Esdra Pontremoli; 10 January 1818 Chieri
- Died: 1 February 1888 (aged 70) Vercelli
- Children: Pio Pontremoli, Enrico Graziadio Pontremoli
- Parent: Eliseo Pontremoli
- Dynasty: Pontremoli
- Occupation: Rabbi, professor, editor, pedagogist, poet, writer

Religious life
- Religion: Judaism
- Profession: Rabbi, poet

Jewish leader
- Position: Chief rabbi of Vercelli
- Dynasty: Pontremoli

Esdra Pontremoli (Chieri, 10 January 1818 – Vercelli, 1 February 1888) was an Italian rabbi, poet, writer, editor, teacher, pedagogist and member of the Pontremoli dynasty. He founded with Giuseppe Levi L'Educatore Israelita, the first Jewish journal in Italy.

== Biography ==
Ezra Pontremoli was born in Ivrea in 1888, the son of rabbi Eliseo Graziado Pontremoli (born in Casale Monferrato in 1778 and died in Nice in 1851) and Bella Eleonora Olivetti (died in Nice in 1874, nephew of the banker Laudadio Formiggini), exponent of a wealthy family of bankers from Modena. On his mother's side, he was related to Angelo Fortunato Formiggini and to Camillo Olivetti, founder of the eponymous typewriter manufacturer. He was the brother of Raffaele Pontremoli, uncle of Emmanuel Pontremoli, Roberto Pontremoli and grandfather of Aldo Pontremoli, Mario Pontremoli. Influenced by the figure of his father, an exponent of an important dynasty of rabbis, he decided to undertake theological studies and become a rabbi. In 1844 Esdra Pontremoli became professor of Hebrew and French in the Foa College of Vercelli. In the following years he also became a professor of French language at the technical institute of Vercelli. In January 1853, he founded with Rabbi Cav. Giuseppe Levi (1814–1874), the newspaper "L'educatore Israelita", the first in Italy, which initially reports as a subtitle "Journal for Jewish families". From 1859 the subtitle will change to "Journal for the history and spirit of Judaism" which will remain until July 1874. On 2 January 1882, he was awarded, upon decision of King Umberto I, the honor of Knight of the Order of the Italian crown as recognition of the important propaganda in favor of the unification of Italy carried out through the newspaper "L'educatore Israelita".

== Bibliography ==
- "Esdra Pontremoli". In: Jewish Encyclopedia, Vol. XIX, 1888 Isidore Singer (on-line)
- "Esdra Pontremoli". In: I Rabbini Italiani, 2012 David Bruno e Pellegrino Polacco (on-line)
- L'epistolario di Marco Mortara (1815–1894): un rabbino italiano tra riforma ...Di Marco Mortara, Asher Salah (on-line)
- Seduta della Camera dei Deputati del 30 Gennaio 1854
- "Les Pontremoli, deux dynasties rabbiniques en Turquie et en Italie" Parigi, 1997
- Corriere Della Sera: "Una storia di carattere, 150 anni di stampa ebraica in Italia"

== See also ==
- Pontremoli (disambiguation)
