= Pietro Perreau =

Italian priest, librarian and orientalist (1827–1911)

Cav. Uff. Abate Prof. Pietro Perreau
- Born: 27 October 1827; Piacenza, Duchy of Parma
- Died: 1911 (aged 83–84); Florence, Italy

Academic background
- Education: Alberoni College

Academic work
- Discipline: Oriental studies
- Sub-discipline: Rabbinic literature
- Institutions: National Library of Parma

Pietro Perreau (27 October 1827 – 1911) was an Italian librarian, academic, writer, and Hebraist.

== Biography ==
Pietro Perreau was born in Piacenza on 27 October 1827. His father was an engineer with origins in Franche-Comté, and his mother a member of the local aristocracy. He studied in the Alberoni College of his native town from 1844 to 1849, and continued to study philology and philosophy until 1853. In 1854 he became a teacher of Greek, German, and history at the Collegio Carlo Alberto in Moncalieri, and between 1855 and 1856 he taught Greek and German at the Maria Luigia College in Parma.

Perreau was appointed director of the Landiana Library in his native city in 1857. Three years later, he was placed at the head of the Oriental collection in the National Library of Parma, of which he was made chief librarian in 1876. He was a member of the Deputazione di storia patria, and active in a number of Orientalist societies. Notably, Perreau was one of two vice-presidents at the Fourth International Congress of Orientalists in Florence in 1878.

Though himself a Catholic priest, he was an avowed philosemite who published historical, literary and scientific studies in various Jewish journals, including the Antologia Israelitica and the Vessillo Israelitico. Prior to 1860 Perreau had written on various subjects, but from then on he devoted himself exclusively to rabbinical Jewish literature.

Among other works, Perreau published a polygraphic edition of the commentary of Immanuel of Rome on the Psalms (Parma, 1879–82), on Esther (1880), and on Lamentations (1881). He also published the Ma'amar Gan 'Eden of Rabbi Ḥayyim Israel, in the Zunz Jubelschrift, and Oceano dello abbreviature e sigle ebraiche, caldaiche, rabbiniche, talmudiche, cabalistiche, geographiche, etc. (Parma, 1883; polygraphic edition), a lexicon of Hebrew abbreviations.

== Selected publications ==
- Hebräische Handschriften in Parma (in German). Vol. 7–8. Berlin. 1864–1865.
- "Comento sopra Giobbe del Rab. Immanuel ben Salomo". Annuario della societa Italiana per gli studi orientali. 1. 1872.
- Berliner, Abraham (1874). Dalle biblioteche italiane. Translated by Perreau, Pietro. Rome: Tipografia delle scienze matematiche e fisiche. Originally published in Il Buonarroti, 1873.
- Della medicina teorico-pratica del Rabbi Natan Ben Joel Palquera. 1878.
- Relazione intorno al Comento ebreo-rabbinico del R. Immanuel ben Selomo sopra la Cantica. Parma. 1878.
- Zunz, Leopold (1879). Storia degli Ebrei in Sicilia. Translated by Perreau, Pietro. Parma.
- Relazione intorno al libro di Daniele. Corfu. 1879.
- Intorno all'opera Chovoth ha-Levavoth e la teologia di Bachia Ibn Pakuda. Padua. 1879.
- Educazione e coltura degli Israeliti in Francia e Germania. Corfu: G. Nacamulli. 1880.
- Intorno alle esposizioni mistiche in lingua ebreo-rabbinica del Rabbi Nathan ben Abigdor. Padova: Crescini. 1880.
- Catalogo dei codici Ebraici della biblioteca di Parma non descritti dal de Rossi. Firenze. 1880.
- Comento ebreo-rabbinico sopra il libro di Ester del Rabbi Immanuel ben Selomo. Parma. 1880.
- Comento ebreo-rabbinico sopra il volume di Treni del R. Immanuel ben Selomo. Parma. 1881.
- Comento ebreo-rabbinico sopra Rut del R. Immanuel ben Selomo. Parma. 1881.
- Intorno agli atti del IV congresso internazionale degli Orientalisti tenuto in Firenze nel Septembre 1878. Vol. 1. Corfu. 1881.
- Oceano delle abbreviature e sigle ebraiche, caldaiche, rabbiniche, talmudiche, cabalistiche, geografiche, de' titoli di libri, de' nomi d'autori, delle iscrizioni sepolcrali, etc., colle loro varie soluzioni raccolte ed ordinate (2nd ed.). Parma. 1883. hdl:2027/hvd.32044100005669.
- Intorno al comento inedito ebreorabbinico del Rabbi' Immanuel ben Selomo' sopra Giobbe. Vol. 1–2. Corfu: G. Nacamulli. 1884. hdl:2027/hvd.hwh1r9.
- Educazione e contra degl'Israeliti in Italia nel Medio Evo. Corfu: G. Nacamulli. 1885.
- "Intorno ad alcune donne Ebree letterate". Corriere Israelitico. Trieste: 3–8. 1886.
- Guida storica antica e monumentale della città di Parma. 1887.
