= Battle of Solferino =

Battle of the Second Italian War of Independence

- Part of the Second Italian War of Independence
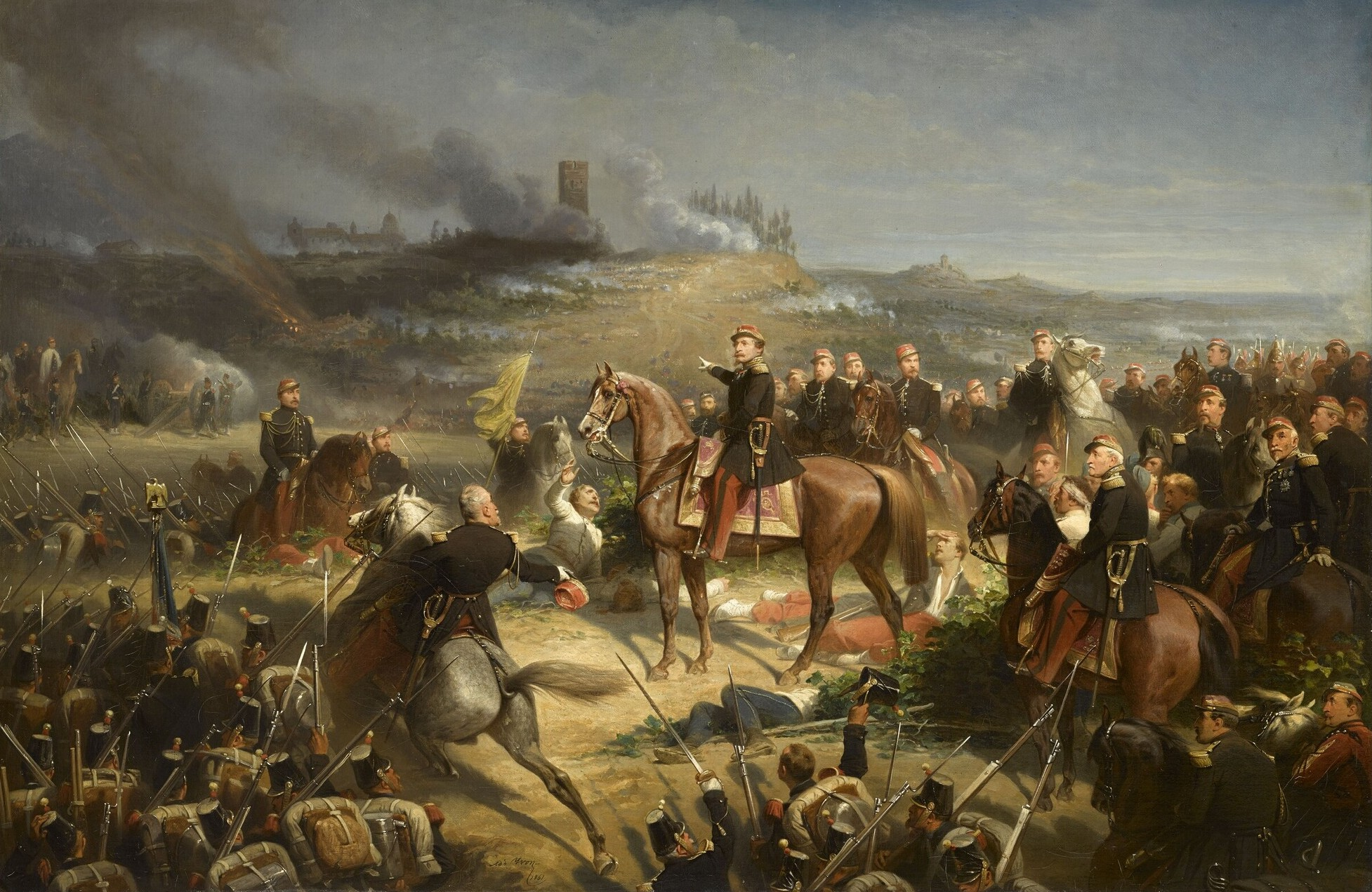
- The Battle of Solferino by Adolphe Yvon, 1861
Date	24 June 1859
Location	Solferino, Kingdom of Lombardy–Venetia (present-day Lombardy, Italy) 45°22′2″N 10°33′59″E
Result	Franco-Sardinian victory: End of the Italian War of Independence; Armistice of Villafranca

Belligerents
France (Kingdom of Sardinia) Sardinia	(Austrian Empire) Austria

Commanders and leaders
(France) Napoleon III (Kingdom of Sardinia) Victor Emmanuel II	(Austrian Empire) Franz Joseph I

Strength
(France); 82,935 infantry 9,162 cavalry 240 guns (Kingdom of Sardinia) (Note: Figures known for the 5 Brigades at San Martino, excluding the 3 Brigades of Durando and Fanti, 21.842 infantry, 765 cavalry and 48 guns link text p. 20-21); 37,174 infantry 1,562 cavalry 80 guns Total: 130,833–133,000; 320 guns	(Austrian Empire); 119,783 infantry 9,490 cavalry 429 guns Total: 129,273; 429 guns: Present: 102,500 men

Casualties and losses
France: 1,622 killed Including 117 officers 8,530 wounded 1,518 missing Sardinia: (Note: Figures for the 5 Brigades at San Martino only, excluding the 3 Brigades of Durando and Fanti engaged at Madonna della Scoperta, 729 killed, 298 died of wounds, 3,305 wounded and 671 missing or captured link text p. 21-22); 1,027 killed Including 49 officers 3,305 wounded 671 missing Total: 16,673	2,386 killed Including 94 officers 10,634 wounded 9,290 missing Total: 22,310

The Battle of Solferino (referred to in Italy as the Battle of Solferino and San Martino) on 24 June 1859 was the climactic battle of the Second Italian War of Independence and resulted in the victory of the allied French army under Napoleon III and the Piedmont-Sardinian army under Victor Emmanuel II (together known as the Franco-Sardinian alliance) against the Austrian army under Emperor Franz Joseph I. It was the last major battle in world history in which all the armies were under the personal command of their monarchs. There were approximately 300,000 soldiers on both sides in the most important battle, the largest since the Battle of Leipzig in 1813. The number of soldiers present was about 130,000 Austrian troops and a combined total of 140,000 French and allied Piedmontese troops, but not all were actually involved in the battle. After the battle, the Austrian emperor stopped directly commanding his army.

The battle led the Swiss Henry Dunant to write his book A Memory of Solferino. Although he did not witness the battle (his statement is contained in an "unpublished page" included in the 1939 English edition published by the American Red Cross), he toured the field following the battle and was greatly moved by what he saw. Dunant was staying in Castiglione delle Stiviere at that time in today's House Bondoni Pastorio near the Duomo of Castiglione. It is said that with his carriage he took many wounded soldiers from both sides to the Duomo of Castiglione delle Stiviere where they were cared for by the local women. Horrified by the suffering of wounded soldiers left on the battlefield, Dunant set about a process that led to the Geneva Conventions and the establishment of the International Red Cross. Today in Castiglione there is a Red Cross museum.

Napoleon III was similarly affected by the carnage he saw after the battle. He decided that the war was not worth the cost in suffering and negotiated an end to the war later in the year.

== Background ==
The early weeks of the war went well for the Piedmontese and French, and they largely pushed Austria out of northern Italy. Pressing their advantage, they took Milan and marched further east to finish off Austria before Prussia could get involved in the war.

On 22 June, the French (96,000 men) and Piedmontese (37,000 men) allied army advanced from the Chiese to the Mincio river in northern Italy. The left wing consisted of four Piedmontese divisions, the right wing consisted of the French III and IV corps, while the center consisted of the I and II corps, with the Imperial Guard held in reserve. On 23 June, Franz Josef moved his 1st Army (57,000 men) and 2nd Army (45,500 men) across the Mincio. Both forces were converging on Medole, Solferino, and San Martino.

== Battle ==
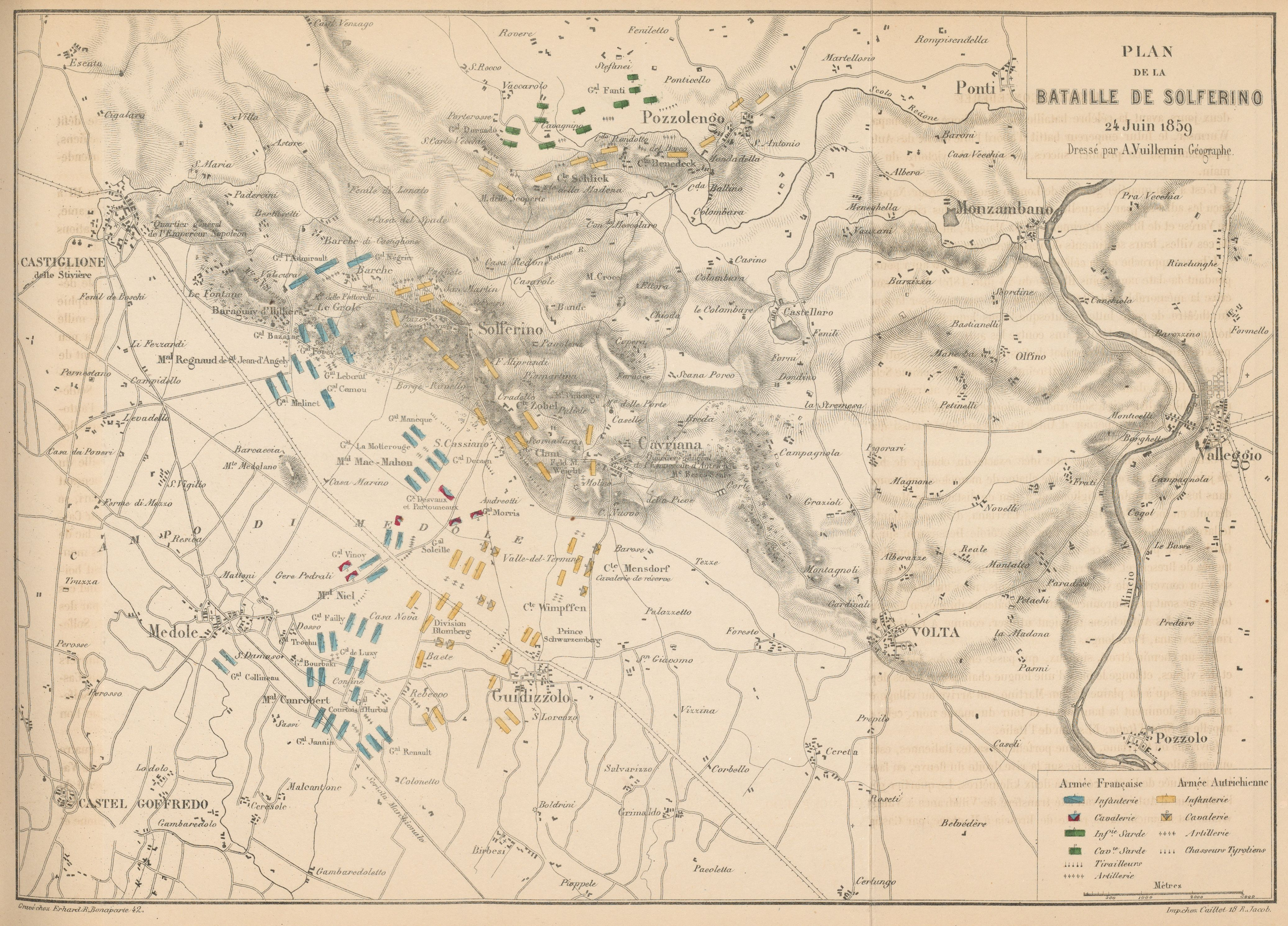
19th century map of the battle

The Battle of Solferino was a decisive engagement in the Second Italian War of Independence, a crucial step in the Italian Risorgimento. The war's geopolitical context was the nationalist struggle to unify Italy, which had long been divided among France, Austria, Spain and numerous independent Italian states. The battle took place near the villages of Solferino and San Martino, Italy, south of Lake Garda between Milan and Verona.

The confrontation was between the Austrians, on one side, and the French and Piedmontese forces, who opposed their advance. In the morning of 23 June, after the arrival of emperor Franz Joseph, the Austrian army changed direction to counterattack along the river Chiese. At the same time, Napoleon III ordered his troops to advance, causing the battle to occur in an unpredicted location. While the Piedmontese fought the Austrian right wing near San Martino, the French battled to the south of them near Solferino against the main Austrian corps.

=== Opposing forces ===
The Austrian forces were personally led by Emperor Franz Joseph, consisting of the 1st Army, containing four corps (II, III, IX and XI) under Franz von Wimpffen, and the 2nd Army, containing four corps (I, V, VII and VIII) under Franz von Schlick.

The French army at Solferino, personally led by Napoleon III, was divided in four Corps plus the Imperial Guard. Many of its men and generals were veterans of the French conquest of Algeria and the Crimean War, but its commander-in-chief had very limited military experience of note. The Sardinian army had four divisions on the field.

Although all three combatants were commanded by their monarchs, each was seconded by professional soldiers. Marshal Jean-Baptiste Philibert Vaillant served as Chief of Staff to Napoleon III, while Victor Emmanuel was accompanied by his Minister of War, Lieutenant General Alfonso Ferrero La Marmora. The Austrian high command was hindered by the rivalry between the Chief of Staff, Heinrich von Heß, and the Emperor's Adjutant General Karl Ludwig von Grünne.

=== Battle commences ===
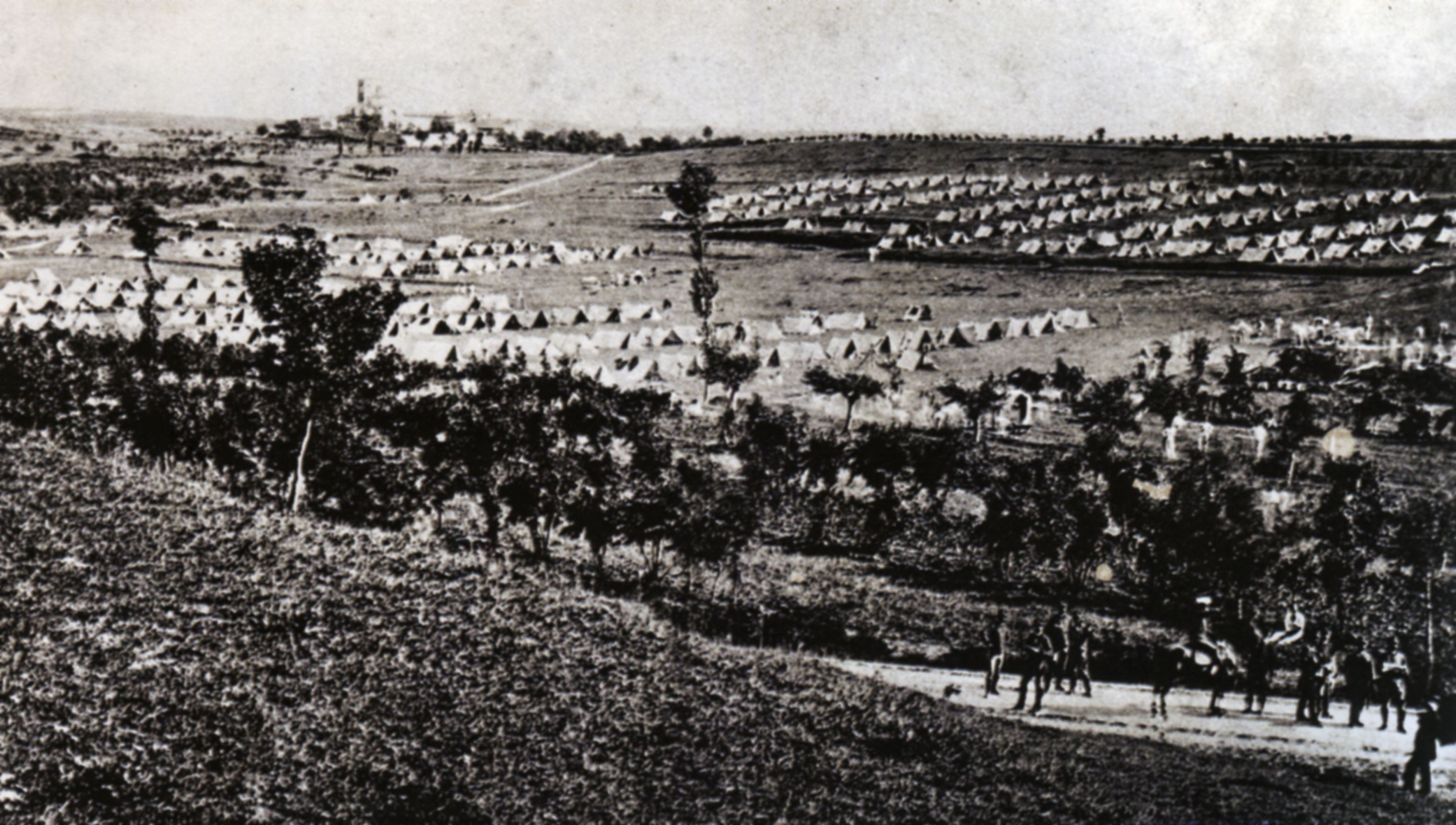
Photo of the Piedmontese camp made one day before the battle at Solferino

According to the allied battle plan formulated on 24 June, the Franco-Sardinian army moved east to deploy along the right river banks of the Mincio. The French were to occupy the villages of Solferino, Cavriana, Guidizzolo and Medole with, respectively, the 1st Corps (Baraguey d'Hilliers), 2nd Corps (Mac-Mahon), 3rd Corps (Canrobert), and 4th Corps (Niel). The four Sardinian divisions were to take Pozzolengo. After marching a few kilometers, the allies came into contact with the Austrian troops, who had entrenched themselves in those villages. In the absence of a fixed battle plan, the fighting which took place was uncoordinated, which is why so many casualties occurred, and it fell into three separate engagements, at Medole (south), Solferino (centre) and San Martino (north).

=== Battle of Campo di Medole ===
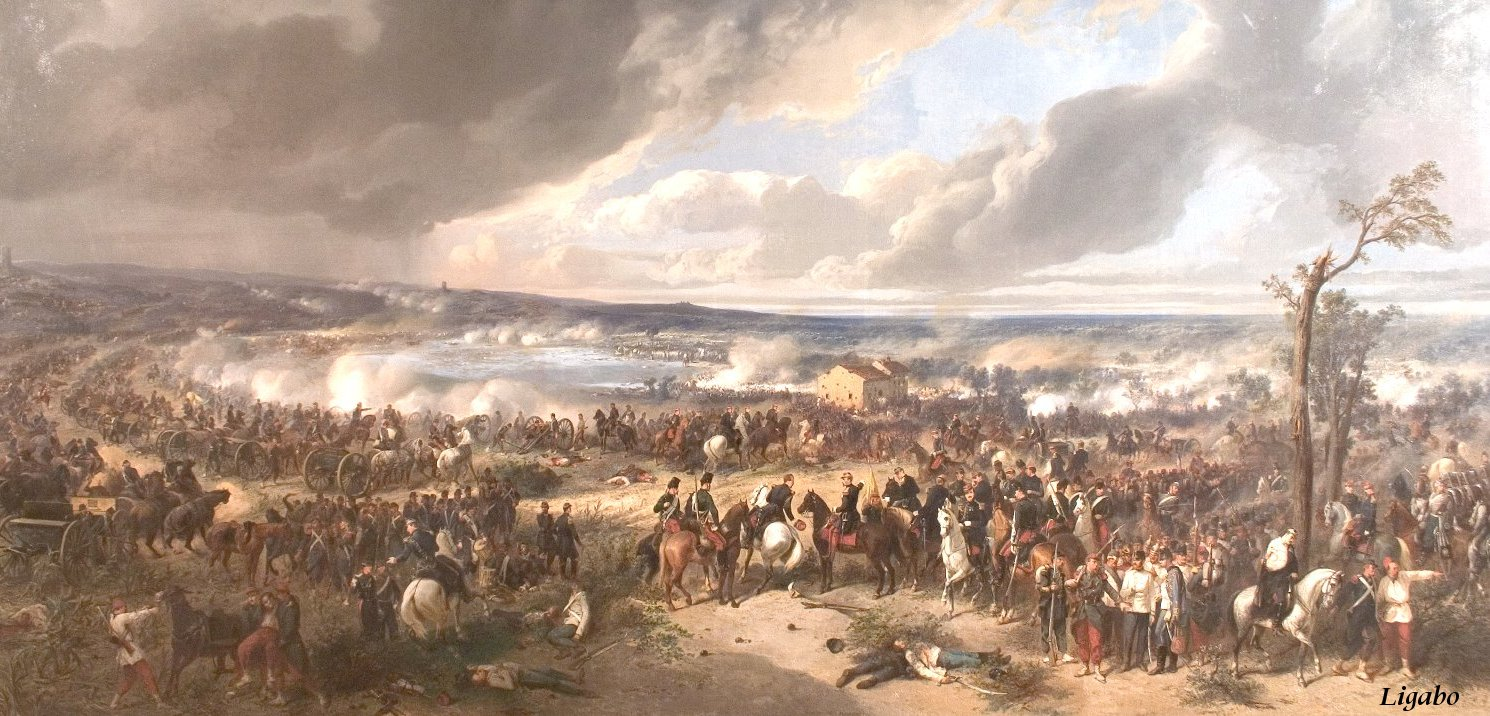
Battle of Campo di Medole

The battle started at Medole around 4 am. Marching towards Guidizzolo, the 4th Corps encountered an Austrian infantry regiment of the Austrian 1st Army. General Niel immediately decided to engage the enemy and deployed his forces east of Medole. This move prevented the three corps (III, IX and XI) of the Austrian 1st Army from aiding their comrades of the 2nd Army near Solferino, where the main French attacks took place.

The French forces were numerically inferior to the Austrians'. The 4th Corps contained three infantry divisions under de Luzy, Vinoy and Failly and a cavalry brigade. Niel, holding a thin line of 5 kilometres (3.1 mi) in length, was able to stop the Austrian assaults on his position by ably warding off attacks and counterattacking at opportune moments.

According to Schneid, "By early afternoon, the Austrian attack had failed and Niel pushed beyond Robecco and Casa Nova halfway to Guidizzolo. At 3:00 pm General Renault's division of Canrobert's III Corps arrived at Robecco. Niel, now reinforced, launched a coordinated attack on Guidizzolo." However, the arrival of the Austrian III and XI Korps stopped the French assault, and after two hours, Niel withdrew.

=== Battle of Solferino ===
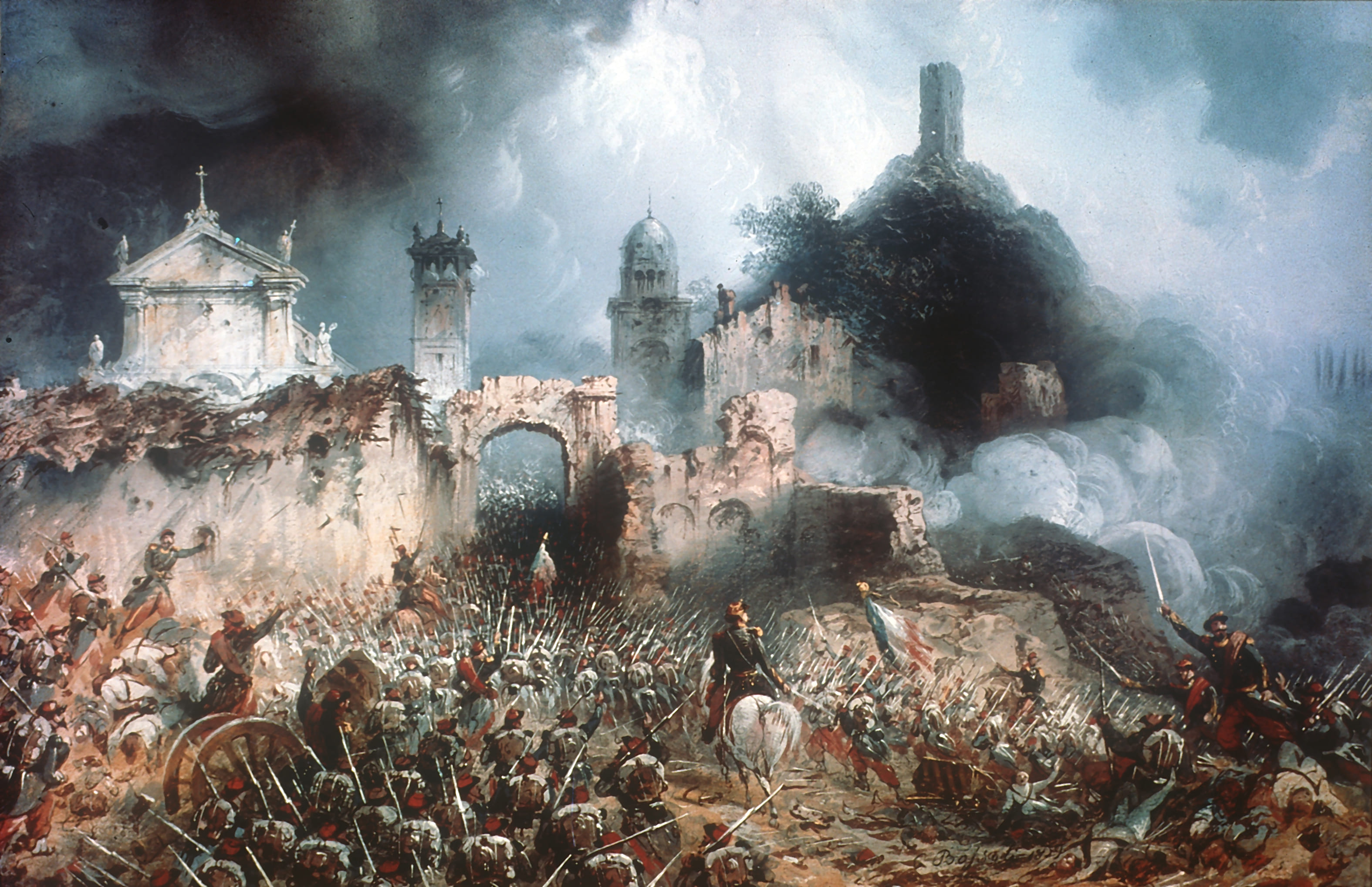
French infantry advances (by Carlo Bossoli)

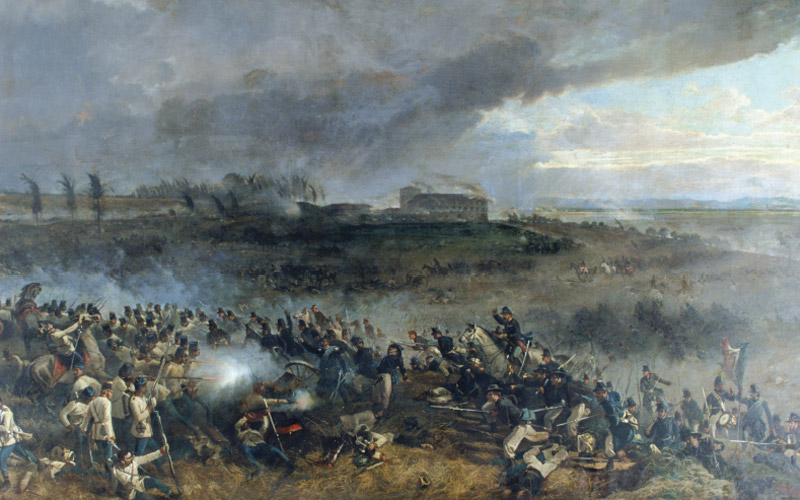
Sardinian troops charge at San Martino
(by Luigi Norfini)

Around 4:30 am the advance guard of the 1st Corps (three infantry divisions under Forey, de Ladmirault, and Bazaine, and a cavalry division under Desvaux) came into contact with the Austrian V Corps under Stadion near Castiglione delle Stiviere.

Around 5 am 2nd Corps under Mac-Mahon (two infantry divisions and a cavalry brigade under La Motterouge, Decaen and Gaudin) encountered Hungarian units posted near Ca’Morino (Medole). The Austrian forces were three corps strong (I, V and VII) and positioned on the towns of Solferino, Cavriana and Volta Mantovana. The Austrians were able to hold these positions all day against repeated French attacks.

According to Schneid, "Stadion received reinforcements from Clam Gallas' I Korps but Napoleon III fed the Imperial Guard divisions into the combat and by 2:00 pm the cemetery and town were surrounded.

Near 3 pm the French reserves, formed by Canrobert's 3rd Corps and the Imperial Guard under Regnaud, attacked Cavriana, which was defended by the Austrian I Corps under Clam-Gallas, finally occupying it at 6 pm and thereby breaking through the Austrian center. This breakthrough forced a general retreat of both Austrian armies.

=== Battle of San Martino ===
On the northern side of the battlefield the Sardinians, four divisions strong, encountered the Austrians around 7 am. A long battle erupted over control of Pozzolengo, San Martino and Madonna della Scoperta. The Austrian VIII Corps under Benedek had 39,000 men and 80 guns and was repeatedly attacked by a Sardinian force of 22,000 men with 48 guns. From 7:00 AM to 17:00 PM San Martino was seized three times by various Piedmontese units, but the Austrians recaptured it as many times, inflicting heavy losses upon the attackers; at the end of the day Benedek was ordered to retreat with the rest of the Austrian army, but ignored the order and kept resisting. At 8:00 pm a fourth Sardinian assault conquered San Martino again and secured the contested hills, with the Austrians withdrawing after a final and failed counterattack. The main Sardinian contribution in the overall battle consisted in keeping Benedek's corps deeply engaged throughout the day, forcing two brigades fighting between Solferino and Madonna della Scoperta to rush to the scene and preventing the sending of another two brigades as reinforcement to the troops attacked by the French in Solferino.

=== Results ===
The battle was a particularly gruelling one, lasting over nine hours and resulting in 2,386 Austrian troops killed with 10,634 wounded and 9,290 missing. The Allied armies suffered a total of 2,313 killed, 12,102 wounded and 2,776 captured or missing. Reports of wounded and dying soldiers being shot or bayonetted on both sides added to the horror. In the end, the Austrian forces were forced to yield their positions, and the Allied French-Piedmontese armies won a tactical, but costly, victory. The Austrians retreated to the four fortresses of the Quadrilateral, and the campaign essentially ended.

== Aftermath ==
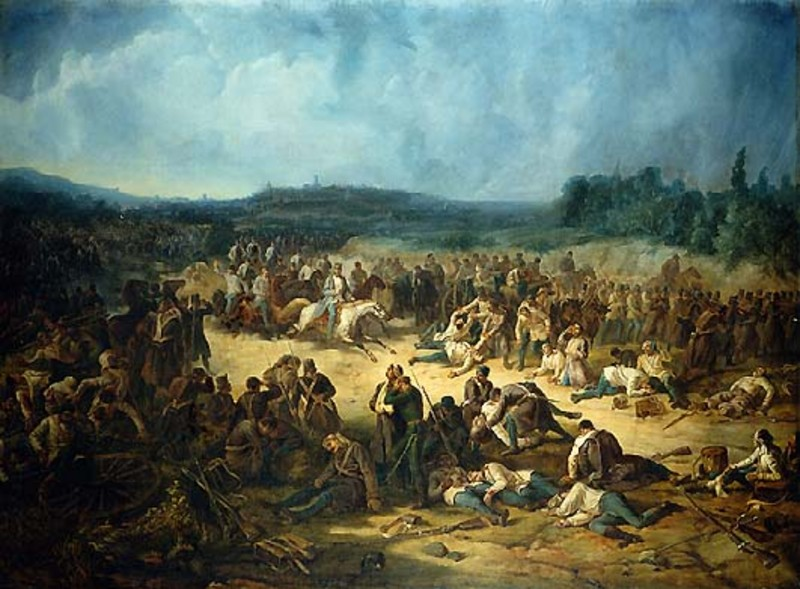
Henry Dunant at Solferino

Napoleon III was moved by the losses, as he had argued back in 1852 "the French Empire is peace", and for reasons including the Prussian threat and domestic protests by the Roman Catholics, he decided to put an end to the war with the Armistice of Villafranca on 11 July 1859. The Piedmontese won Lombardy but not Venetia. Camillo Benso, conte di Cavour, resigned. The Kingdom of Italy was proclaimed in 1861.

This battle would have a long-term effect on the future conduct of military actions. Jean-Henri Dunant, who witnessed the aftermath of the battle in person, was motivated by the horrific suffering of wounded soldiers left on the battlefield to begin a campaign that would eventually result in the Geneva Conventions and the establishment of the International Red Cross. The Movement organized the 150th anniversary commemoration of the battle between 23 and 27 June 2009. The Presidency of the European Union adopted a declaration on the occasion stating that "This battle was also the grounds on which the international community of States has developed and adopted instruments of International Humanitarian Law, the international law rules relevant in times of armed conflict, in particular the four Geneva Conventions of 1949, the 60th anniversary of which will be celebrated this year."

In 2019, an important memorial event took place on the former battlefield in the presence of Karl von Habsburg, the head of the House of Habsburg, representatives of the Order of St. George and the presidents of the Society of Solferino and San Martino to emphasize the peace of the nations. Wreaths were laid in the cemeteries and the museum was honored. During the event, the battle was re-enacted by hundreds of volunteers.

== The battlefield today ==
The area contains a number of memorials to the events surrounding the battles.

There is a circular tower, Tower of San Martino della Battaglia, dominating the area, a memorial to Victor Emmanuel II. It is 70 m high and was built in 1893. In the town there is a museum, with uniforms and weapons of the time, and an ossuary chapel.

At Solferino there is also a museum, displaying arms and mementos of the time, and an ossuary, containing the bones of thousands of victims.

Nearby Castiglione delle Stiviere, where many of the wounded were taken after the battle, is the site of the museum of the International Red Cross, focusing on the events that led to the formation of that organization.

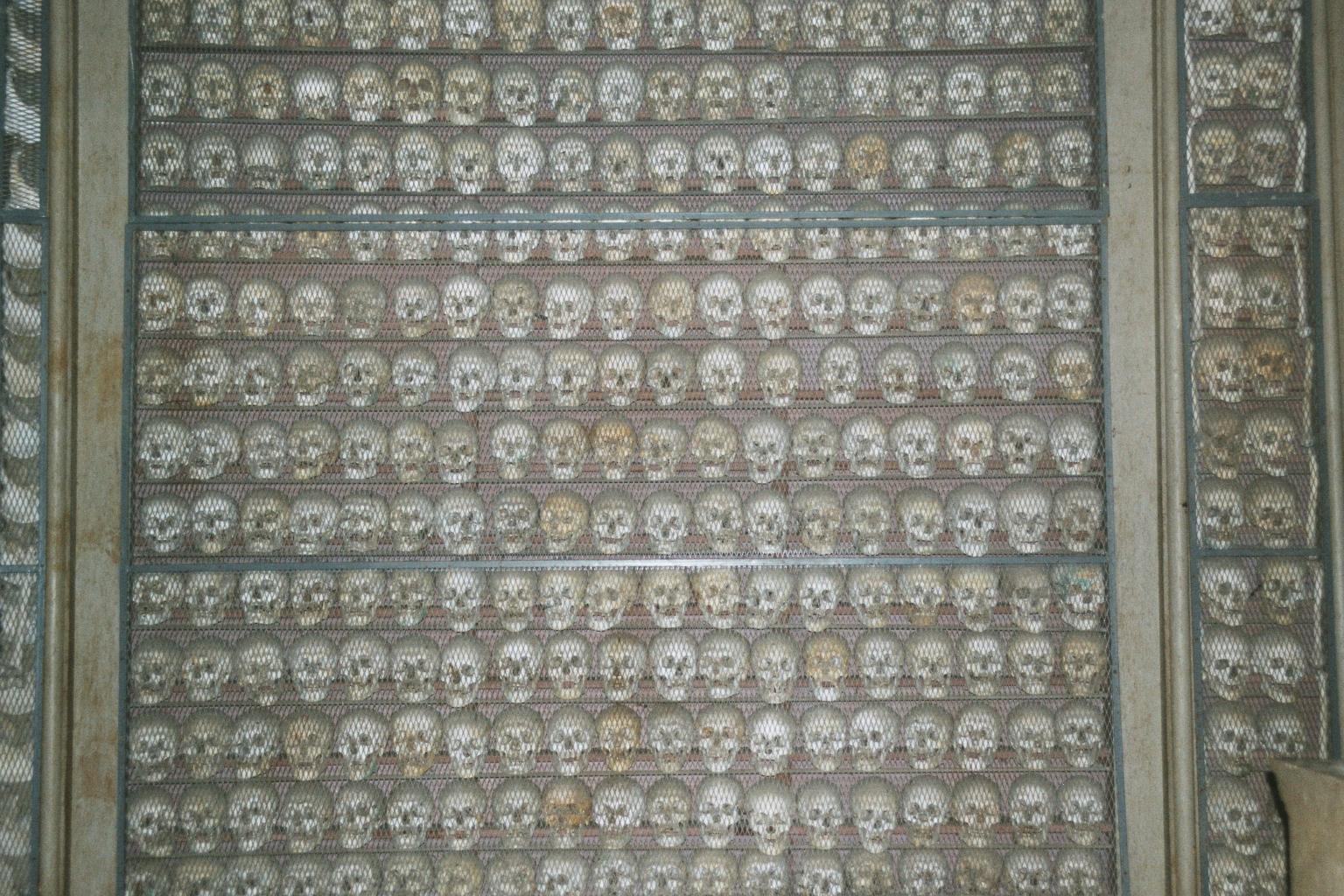
The ossuary of Solferino

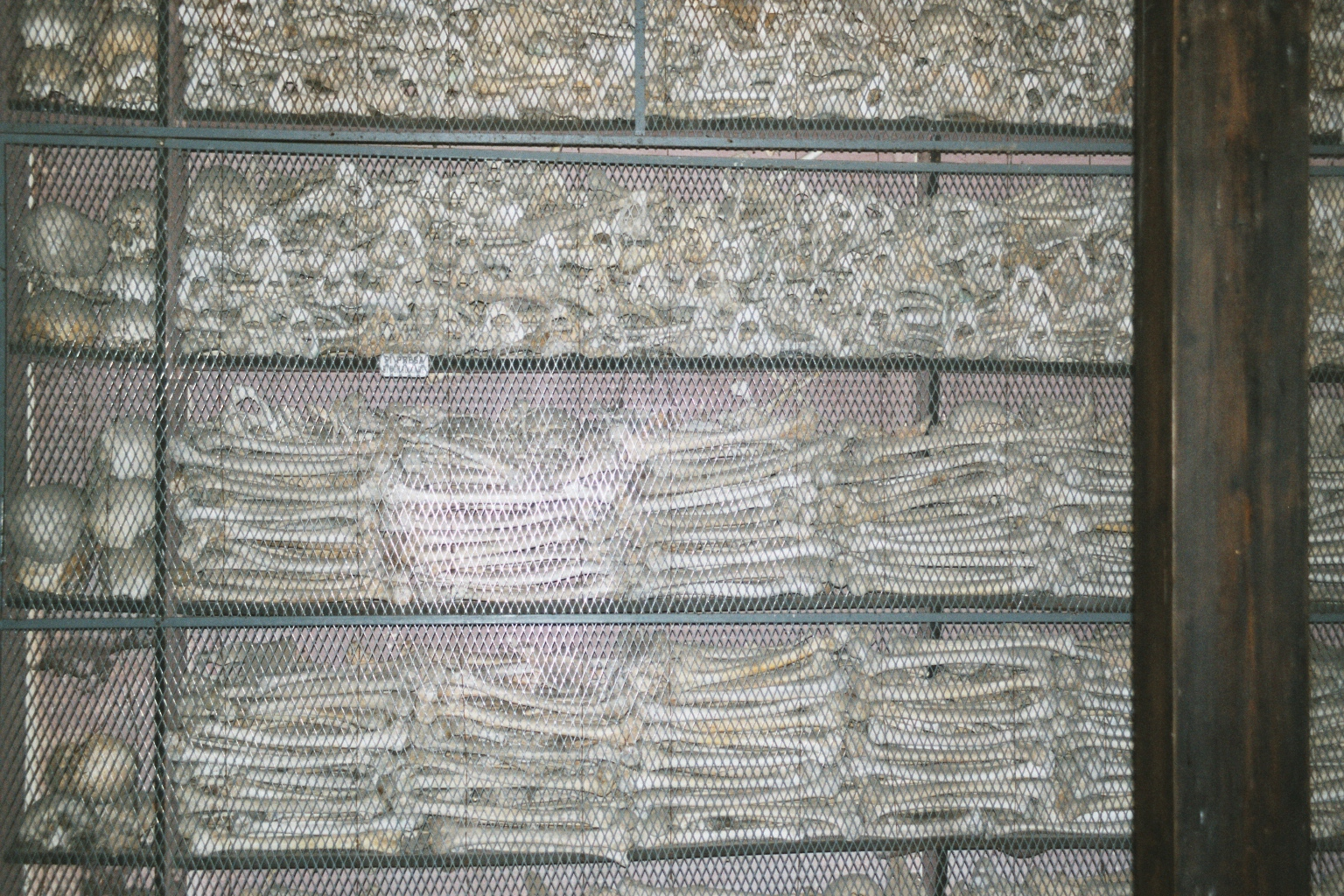
The ossuary of Solferino

== References in popular culture ==
Elizabeth Barrett Browning's poem "The Forced Recruit at Solferino" commemorates this battle (Last Poems 1862). Joseph Roth's 1932 novel Radetzky March opens at the Battle of Solferino. There, the father of the novel's Trotta dynasty is immortalized as the Hero of Solferino.

The Battle of Solferino was depicted also in a 2006 television drama Henry Dunant: Du rouge sur la croix (English title: "Henry Dunant: Red on the Cross"), which tells the story of the signing of the Geneva Conventions and the founding of the Red Cross.

A Memory of Solferino, the battle, and the town itself are discussed in 2010's Chang-Rae Lee's novel The Surrendered.
