= Flaminio Servi =

Personal life
- Born: 24 December 1841 Pitigliano, Tuscany
- Died: 23 January 1904 (aged 62) Casale Monferrato, Italy
- Spouse: Elisa Osimo

Religious life
- Religion: Judaism
- Position: Chief Rabbi of Casale Monferrato
- Began: 1872
- Ended: 1904

Flaminio Ephraim Servi (Hebrew: אפרים בן שלמה נחמיה סרוִי, romanized: Efra'im ben Shlomo Neḥemiah Servi; 24 December 1841 – 23 January 1904) was an Italian rabbi, writer, and editor.

== Biography ==
Title page of Gli israeliti d’Europa nella civiltà (1871)

Flaminio Servi was born in Pitigliano, Tuscany, to Fiore (née Castelnuovo) Samuele Servi. At the age of eleven he translated the Book of Proverbs, and completed a version of Psalms left unfinished by an elder brother who had died early in life. He obtained the degree of chaver in his native town in 1864. He afterwards studied at the Collegio Rabbinico Italiano and the University of Padua, receiving the degree of hakham from Rabbi Moses Sorani in 1867.

Servi served as rabbi in Monticelli from 1864 to 1867, after which he held the rabbinate of Mondovì. He was finally appointed chief rabbi of Casale Monferrato in 1872, a position he held until his death.

Servi was a prolific writer, contributing a great number of essays on literature and Jewish studies to the Jewish journals of Italy, such as L'Educatore Israelita and Corriere Israelitico. He succeeded Giuseppe Levi as editor of L'Educatore upon the latter's death in 1874. He edited also the almanac Annuario della Famiglia Israelitica (Corfu, 1870–74) and Lunario Israelitico (Casale, 1881–1904).

He was created a Chevalier of the Crown of Italy in 1877.

== Selected publications ==
- Dell'istruzione e del culto nella università israelitica di Pitigliano. Florence. 1861.
- Statistica degli Israeliti Italiani. Vercelli. 1866.
- Elogio funebre di E. Osimo. Parma. 1867.
- Parolle sulla tomba di A. Momigliano. Turin. 1867.
- Versi per l'infanzia. Mondovi. 1868.
- Elogio funebre di A. Momigliano. Turin. 1868.
- Angelo Paggi e le sue opere. Corfu. 1871.
- Gli israeliti d'Europa nella civiltà: memorie storiche, biografiche e statistiche dal 1789 al 1870. Turin: Foa. 1871. hdl:2027/uc2.ark:/13960/t2k64tp3j.
- La Maggiorità religiosa. Casale. 1872.
- Dante e gli Ebrei. Casale: G. Pane. 1893.
- Studii sulla Missione della Donna Israelità. Casale: G. Pane. 1903.
- Versi in Ebraicæ in Italiano.
