= Benjamin Pontremoli =

Turkish rabbi and poet

Personal life
- Born: Bejamin Pontremoli c. 1740 Smyrna
- Died: c. 1784 Smyrna
- Children: Hiyya Pontremoli Isiah Joseph Pontremoli
- Dynasty: Pontremoli
- Occupation: Rabbi

Religious life
- Religion: Judaism
- Profession: Rabbi, Poet

Jewish leader
- Position: Chief rabbi of Smyrna
- Dynasty: Pontremoli

Benjamin Pontremoli (Smyrna, 1740 – Smyrna, 1784) was a Turkish rabbi and poet, member of the Pontremoli dynasty.

== Biography ==
Benjamin Pontremoli was an important rabbi of the Turkish Jewish community in the 19th century. He was an excellent author, among his most famous works is "Shebeṭ Binyamin" (Salonica, 1824) describing the laws of finances and financial documents. He was descended from a branch of an important family of rabbis of Italian origin who immigrated from Casale Monferrato in the seventeenth century. From the Italian branch important rabbis were born such as Rav.Eliseo Graziadio Pontremoli (Great Rabbi of Nice), Rav.Gabriel Pontremoli (Chief Rabbi of Turin), Rav.Chakam Esdra Pontremoli (Rabbi of Vercelli).

== Bibliography ==
- "Les Pontremoli, deux dynasties rabbiniques en Turquie et en Italie" Parigi, 1997 (on-line)
- «Benjamin Pontremoli». In: Jewish Encyclopedia, Vol. XIX, 1888 Isidore Singer (on-line)
