= Roberto Pontremoli =

Italian insurer

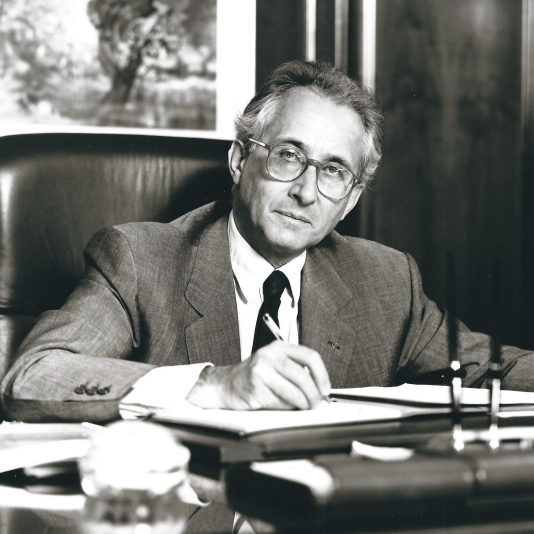
- Born: Roberto Giovanni Pio Pontremoli; May 5, 1937 (age 89); Milan, Italy
- Occupation: insurance executive
- Spouses: Laura Sagona

Roberto Pontremoli (born June 5, 1937) is an Italian insurance executive. From 1993 to 1999, he was CEO of the Istituto Nazionale delle Assicurazioni (INA), and in 1994, founded the Rotary International club of Milan.

== Biography ==
Roberto Pontremoli was born to Mario Pontremoli and Maria Spangher (born in 1889 in Bari and died in Milan), member of a wealthy family of Venetian origin; her ancestor Cav. Giovanni Spangher (son of Johann Spangher) was an important manager of Credito Italiano. Pontremoli is related to his namesake Roberto Pontremoli. In 1943, due to the imminent war, he moved with his family to Switzerland where his father was already residing for work reasons, and at the end of the war in 1946, he returned to Milan.

Graduated in law, he worked in a law firm and then joined the RAS company in May 1960. In 1972, he became managing director of the Padana Assicurazioni and Agip assicurazioni Spa companies belonging to the ENI group. In 1973 he convinced the top management of Eni to join the Oil Insurance Ltd. mutual company with headquarters in Bermuda, where he represents the interests of the group on the board of directors. In 1977 Pontremoli left Eni to join the SAI in Turin as general manager, and then in 1979 he took on the role of general manager of the insurance company La Fondiaria.

In 1981, he moved from the Fondiaria to La previdente Spa as CEO. During his assignment to the Previdente, the income was significantly increased (by 22%) with the consequent listing on the stock exchange. In 1991 he left "La Previdente" to assume the position of president of the company Fenice Riassurance Spa for one year. In 1992 he was appointed extraordinary commissioner of the insurance company MAA by the insurance supervisory body ISVAP on the recommendation of the Minister of Industry Paolo Savona, with the task of saving the company from bankruptcy. Once the company was reorganized, SAI took over the main restructured company branch, with the consequent change of top management.

At the beginning of 1993, he was appointed president of the brokerage company Nikols Aon., and in November 1993 he accepted the appointment as chief executive officer of the Istituto Nazionale delle Assicurazioni (INA) from the Treasury Minister Lamberto Dini. As CEO of Assitalia SpA, he promoted the development of international relations and worked on the Boards of the investee companies in Italy, France, Spain, Russia and (Germany), freeing the group from some investors with results deemed inadequate. In 1999, the sale of INA to Assicurazioni Generali led to a change of top management.

In 1998, he was appointed vice-president of the Treccani Institute. Since 2003 he has been president of the Lombardy section of the AIDA company (position transferred by his friend Giorgio Sacerdoti), organizing conferences on the digitization of banking and insurance companies in this role. Since 2006 he has been managing director of Ergo Assicurazioni Spa. Since 2014 he has been collaborating with PRB S.r.l to try to implement the process of digitizing the organizational processes of insurance companies.

== Honors ==
- PH Fellow of Rotary Club International

== See also ==
- Esdra Pontremoli
