= Raffaele Pontremoli =

Italian painter (1832–1906)

Raffaele Pontremoli, also known as Raffaello Pontremoli (1832 in Chieri – 1906 in Milan), was an Italian painter, mainly as a battle painter.

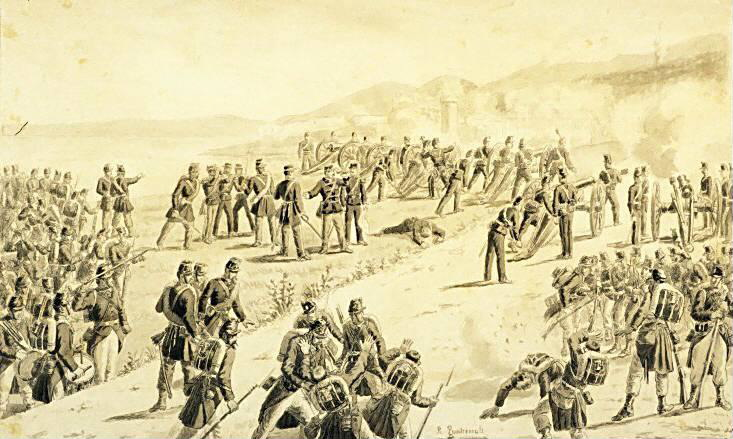
Manfredo Fanti a Mola di Gaeta.

== Biography ==
Pontremoli studied at the Academy of Arts in Nice, where his father was rabbi for the local community. He then moved to Turin to study at the Accademia Albertina under Carlo Arienti. In 1852, at the Albertina, one of Pontremoli's works won an award. In 1855, he painted An attack of the Outposts. He traveled to Paris, where he studied with Horace Vernet, and in 1859 with the War of Independence renewed, he returned to Italy and worked as correspondent for the journal Illustration of Paris. He assisted the Battalion of Palestro and San Martino; one of his drawings was purchased by Emperor Napoleon III, and presented to King Victor Emanuel II. Among his works is a large canvas depicting La presa di Mola di Gaeta, found at the Officer's Club of the 5th Artillery; Il passaggio del Gorigliano; and a large canvas of Prince Carignano at the batteries of Cappuccini, during the Siege of Gaeta (1860). In 1866 he followed the armies again, and illustrated two events: Prince Umberto at Villafranca amid the quadrato of the 49th infantry and Prince Amedeo wounded at the attack of Cavalchina near Custoza, now found in Palazzo Pitti of Florence. In 1869, he was nominated Vice-Inspector of the Royal Pinacoteca of Turin, and in 1876 Inspector.

He painted the portrait of Count Cibrario, who was Grand Master of the Order of Saints Maurizio e Lazzaro, of which Pontremoli was also an officer. For his canvas Umberto and the Quadrato del 1866, exhibited at Turin in 1880, he was awarded knighthood and the medal of commander of the Order of the Crown of Italy. In 1891, he painted frescoes for the Tower of San Martino, which serves as a monument dedicated to those who fought in the Battle of Solferino.

Lombardy institutions have many sketches by the artist of events and places used in his paintings.

== Honours ==
- Commendatore of the order of the crown of Italy. (On request of the king Umberto I)
