= Giacomo Alatri =

Italian banker and philanthropist

Giacomo Alatri (1833 in Rome – 9 March 1889 in Rome) was an Italian banker and philanthropist, the son of Samuel Alatri. He was for several years president of the Banca Romana, which position he resigned when, in 1881, his propositions for the reorganization of the bank were rejected. The subsequent history of that institution, its ultimate bankruptcy in 1893, and the grave political disturbances occasioned by it throughout Italy known as the Banca Romana scandal, fully justified the courageous stand taken by Alatri. His chief philanthropic efforts were directed toward organizing kindergartens for the Jewish poor, to the success of which he devoted all his energies. Alatri died at the age of fifty-six, two months before his father. His work on bank reform, entitled Sul Riordinamento delle Banche d'Emissione in Italia, was published in Rome in 1888.
