= Samuel Alatri =

Italian politician (1805–1889)

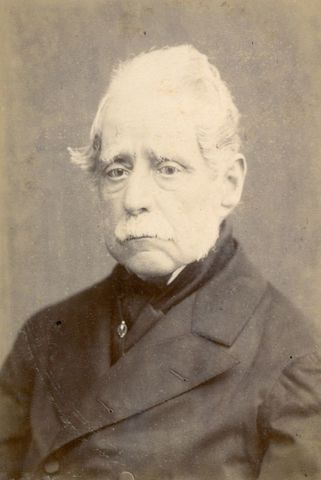
Samuele Alatri

Samuel Alatri (1805 in Rome – May 20, 1889 in Rome) was an Italian politician, communal worker, and orator. For more than sixty years he led the Jewish community of his native city, and bore the brunt of its contests for religious and political freedom.

== Career ==
His public career began at an early age. When only twenty-three years old he was called upon to enter the council of the community, the material and spiritual interests of which he thereafter served with zeal and devotion. From 1840 to 1865, he made annual tours to foreign countries, coming thereby in contact with prominent Jews in France and England, who inspired him with new hopes and encouraged him to persevere in the struggle for justice. Knowing, however, that, in order to lead to happiness, freedom must be supplemented by education, Alatri devoted his special attention to foreign scholastic institutions, accumulating experience which he used for the benefit of the Talmud Torah in Rome. The Roman Jews looked upon him as their legitimate leader and chose him as spokesman of the deputations that annually waited on the pope (Pope Gregory XVI). The latter, though hostile to all progress, could not help being charmed by the oratorical gifts of Alatri, whom he nicknamed "our Cicero," and to whom, on one occasion, he said: "Whenever you have to defend a case of liberty and humanity, come to me." Alatri's influence with the pontiff proved effective only in individual cases, the general position of the Jews remaining as precarious as before.

With the election of Pope Pius IX, who at first showed himself a friend of progress, Alatri redoubled his activities and entered into association with some of the most influential men of Rome. In appreciation of his intellectual and moral qualities he was elected a director of the Pope's Bank, later the Banca Romana; and it is an undisputed fact that the crisis which threatened that institution in 1853 was warded off by Alatri's foresight.

Alatri's efforts on behalf of his brethren were crowned with success in 1870, when King Victor Emmanuel entered Rome and put an end to the temporal power of the pope. On Oct. 2 of that year a deputation, of which Alatri was a member, handed over to the king the result of the plebiscite by which the inhabitants of the Papal Territories declared in favor of annexation to the Kingdom of Italy. Alatri was then appointed one of the commissioners to reduce to order the chaotic finances of the city. He acquitted himself with conspicuous success and was elected to Parliament of Italy by the second district of the city of Rome. He was entrusted with the task of adjusting the Italian budget. Party life, however, was not congenial to him, and after a few years of parliamentary activity he returned to the narrower sphere of the city and the Jewish community.

== Personal life ==
Alatri's son Giacomo Alatri was born in Rome in 1833.

== Death ==
The services rendered by Alatri to his native city were acknowledged by the syndic of Rome, who at Alatri's funeral said: "The city of Rome loved him like a father, and now she mourns his death like that of a father." The following are some of his published speeches: "Discorsi al Dottor Albert Cohn," 1870; "Discorso Pronunziato nella Scuola del Tempio il 23 Aprile, 1881"; "Parole in Occasione della Professione di Fede," 1883; "Per la Inaugurazione del Collegio Rabbinico Italiano Celebrata il 15 Gennaio, 1887, nella Scuola del Tempio."
