= Moses Soave =

Moses Soave was an Italian Hebraist; born in Venice 28 March 1820; died there 27 November 1882. He supported himself as a private tutor in Venetian Jewish families, and collected a library containing many rare and valuable works. Two years before his death he gave up teaching, and devoted himself entirely to study. In addition to numerous articles which appeared in Italian Jewish periodicals he wrote biographies of Sara Copia Sullam, Amatus Lusitanus, Abraham de Balmes, Shabbethai Donnolo and Leon de Modena. He was, besides, the editor of Isacco Israelita's Guida dei Medici (Manhig ha-Rofe'im), translated from an old Hebrew manuscript (Venice, 1861); and wrote Dei Soncino, Celebri Tipografi Italiani nel Secoli XV.-XVI. (Venice, 1878).
