= Hiyya Pontremoli =

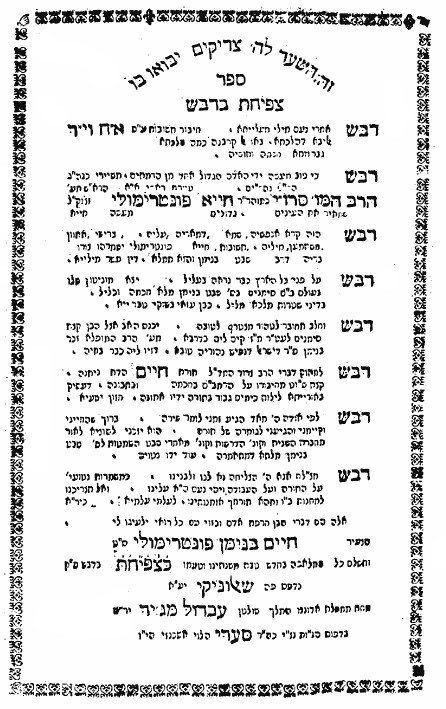

Personal life
- Born: Hiyya Pontremoli; XVIII century Smyrna
- Died: 1823 Smyrna
- Parent: Benjamin Pontremoli
- Dynasty: Pontremoli
- Occupation: Rabbi

Religious life
- Religion: Judaism
- Profession: Rabbi, Poet

Jewish leader
- Predecessor: Benjamin Pontremoli
- Position: Chief rabbi of Smyrna
- Dynasty: Pontremoli

Hiyya Pontremoli (Smyrna, 1764 - Smyrna, 1831) was a Turkish rabbi and poet, member of the Pontremoli dynasty.

== Biography ==
Hiyya Pontremoli was born in Smyrna to the famous rabbi Benjamin Pontremoli; he was an important rabbi of the Turkish Jewish community in the 19th century. He was an excellent and prolific author, among his most important works include "Ẓappiḥit bi-Debash" and the collection of works on "Oraḥ Ḥayyim". He was descended from the branch of an important family of rabbis of Italian origin who had immigrated to Casale Monferrato in the seventeenth century. From the Italian branch important rabbis were born such as Rav.Eliseo Graziadio Pontremoli (Great Rabbi of Nice), Rav. Gabriel Pontremoli (Chief Rabbi of Turin), Rav.Chakam Esdra Pontremoli (Rabbi of Vercelli).

== Bibliography ==
- "Les Pontremoli, deux dynasties rabbiniques en Turquie et en Italie" Parigi, 1997 (on-line)
- «Benjamin Pontremoli». In: Jewish Encyclopedia, Vol. XIX, 1888 Isidore Singer (on-line)
