= Portrait of Napoleon III (Cabanel) =

Painting by Alexandre Cabanel

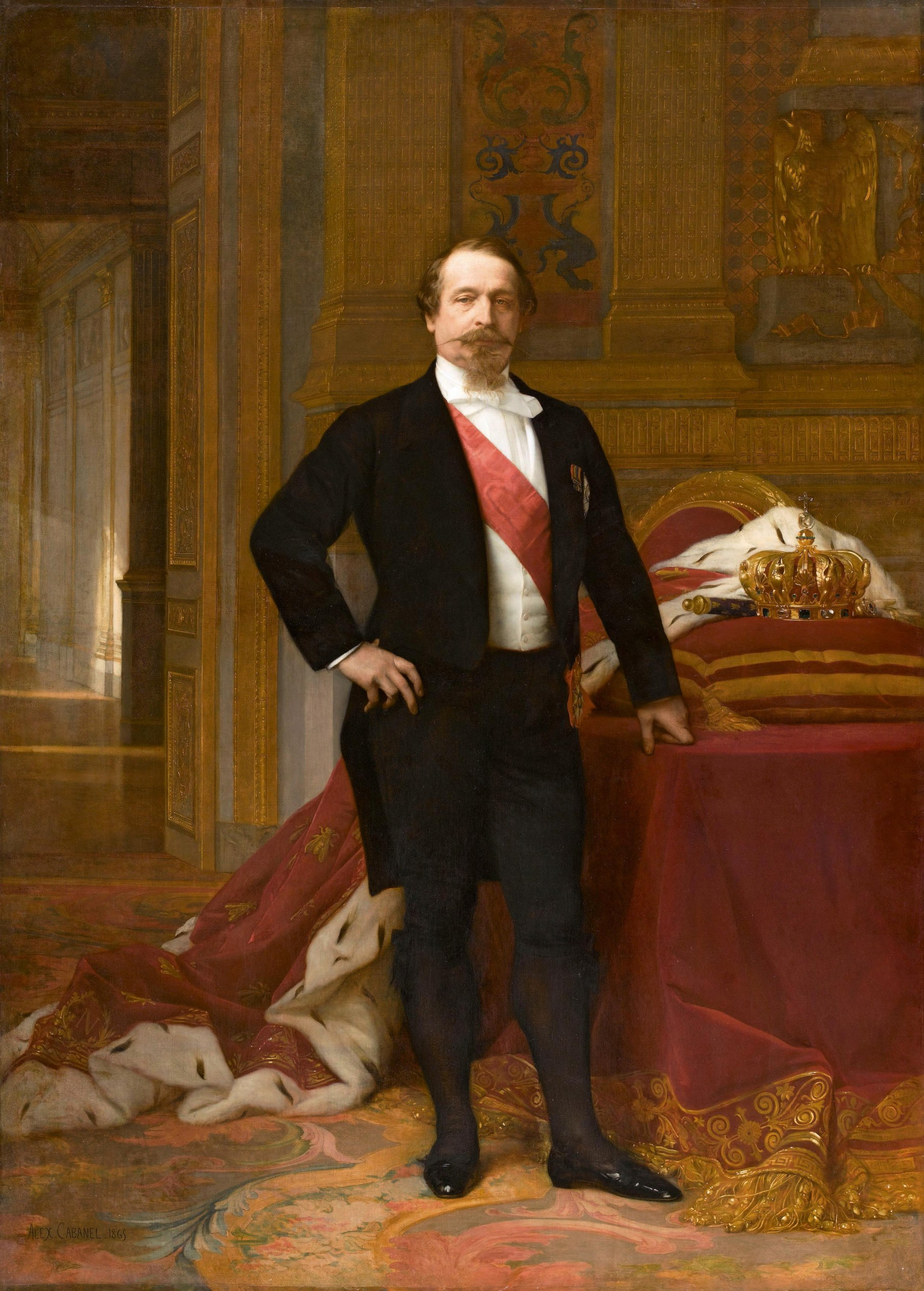
- Artist: Alexandre Cabanel
- Year: 1865
- Medium: Oil on canvas
- Dimensions: 238 cm × 170 cm (94 in × 67 in)
- Location: Château de Compiègne, Compiègne, France

Portrait of Napoleon III is an oil-on-canvas painting by the French painter Alexandre Cabanel, from 1865. It is now in the collection of the Château de Compiègne.

== Description ==
In a vertical format, canvas is a full-length portrait of Napoleon III, Emperor of the French, who is depicted standing inside a room at the Tuileries Palace, in Paris. The emperor faces the viewer, while he rests his right hand on his hip and his left on a piece of furniture draped in red fabric, upon which lie a crown, a sceptre and the mantle, as symbols of imperial authority.

The painting was commissioned by the emperor in 1864, at a time when he already owned Nymph and Satyr and The Birth of Venus, both by Cabanel. It was exhibited at the Salon that same year under the title Portrait of the Emperor.

It was well received in the inner circle of the emperor and was Empress Eugénie de Montijo's favourite portrait of him.

Acquired in 2008, the painting is housed at the Château de Compiègne in Compiègne, Oise. A preparatory sketch is held at the Musée Fesch, in Ajaccio. A copy is part of the collection of the Walters Art Museum, in Baltimore.

Various copies were made and are held in several public collections.
