= Capdeville =

Capdeville, Capdevielle, Capdevilla or Capdevila is a surname, and may refer to:

Capdeville means head of town in Gascon dialect.

- Colette Capdevielle (born 1958), French politician
- Constança Capdeville, Portuguese pianist, percussionist, music educator and composer
- Georges Capdeville, French football referee
- Jean-Patrick Capdevielle, French singer and songwriter
- Joan Capdevila, Spanish footballer
- Juana Capdevielle, Spanish educator and librarian
- Louis Capdevielle, French painter
- Marc Capdevila, Spanish swimmer
- Paul Capdevielle, mayor of New Orleans
- Paul Capdeville, Chilean tennis player
- Pierre Capdevielle (rugby union), French rugby player
- Pierre Capdevielle (musician), French conductor, composer, and music critic
- Pierre Capdeville, French entomologist

== See also ==
- Appeville
