= Phaedra (Cabanel) =

Painting by Alexandre Cabanel

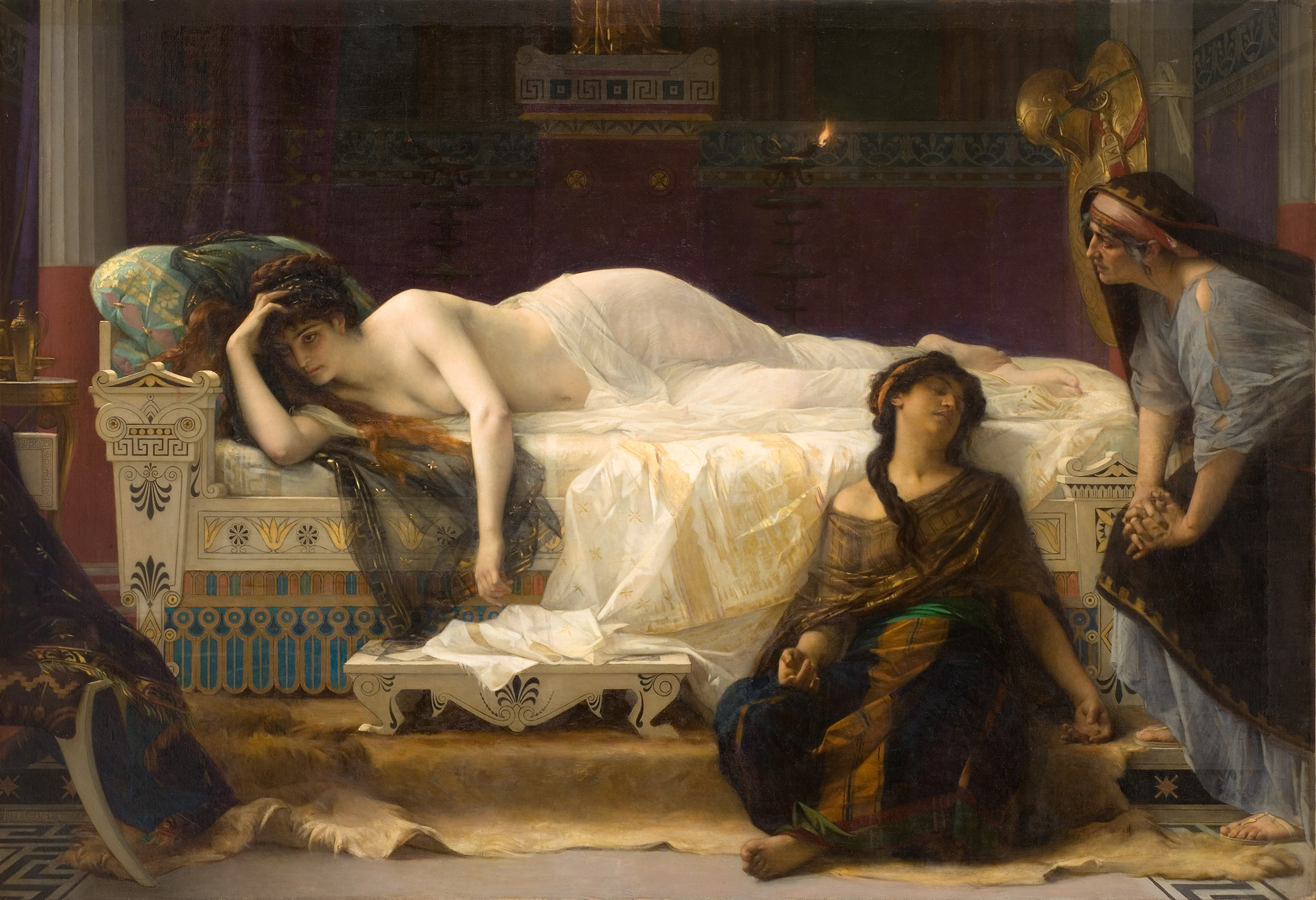
- Artist: Alexandre Cabanel
- Year: 1880
- Medium: Oil on canvas
- Dimensions: 194 cm × 286 cm (76 in × 113 in)
- Location: Musée Fabre, Montpellier

Phaedra is an oil-on-canvas painting executed in 1880 by the French academic painter Alexandre Cabanel. It was exhibited in the Salon of 1880 and later donated by Cabanel to the Musée Fabre, located in his hometown of Montpellier. Phaedra is a large painting of a classical subject in literature, which can be attributed to Cabanel's studies in the Paris École des Beaux-Arts. As Cabanel's painting career developed, he expanded his style to preserve the French Academy while appealing to his personal interests in literature, often depicting new perspectives in contradiction with tradition. Alexandre Cabanel's painting of Phaedra exemplifies his depiction in academic paintings of theatrical heroines.

== Description ==
The painting depicts Phaedra stretched out on her side in a lavishly decorated bed, one arm at supporting her head and one hanging off the edge fingering the expensive drapery. She stares out of the left side of the picture plane, her face dark and resolute, while her unkempt hair is splayed on the decorated pillow. Her pale nude body covered by a sheer white sheet contrasts with the deep red, black, and gold tones around her. Two ladies in waiting are on the right. One is standing, but crouched over slightly, and active. Her body is half out of the picture plane as she peers over at Phaedra, hands clasped as if silently imploring the woman to move. The second lady sits at Phaedra's bedside sleeping, eyes closed, head leaned back, as if resting from the exhaustion of some heavy emotion. The luxurious fabrics on the bed are scattered and slipping off. On the floor is a fur rug, its golden tones reminiscent of the shield, helmet, and sword tied to a column before Phaedra's bed. The furniture and architecture are adorned with oriental designs, creating a foreign look of drama and wealth. The light source for the painting comes from outside of the picture plane on the left, contrasting with the dimly lit lantern in the background.

The size of the painting, a little over six by nine feet, is congruent with a traditional history painting, or a work depicting a historical event in monumental size in order to convey the importance and influence of that moment. This painting type was preferred by Cabanel and other academic painters not only for historical subjects but also for subjects from literature and mythology, as exemplified in Phaedra.

== Subject ==
The painting reveals Cabanel's predilection for literature, which began during his studies at the Paris École des Beaux-Arts. Cabanel spent time at the school as a student and teacher, where he was exposed to classical works of literature, as well as important French writers of the past centuries. Cabanel would have studied Euripides' Hippolytus, written in 429 BCE, a play that details Phaedra's love and betrayal of her stepson, Hippolytus, who denies his stepmother's love. In her sorrow, Phaedra hangs herself, but leaves a suicide note of sorts calling Hippolytus her seducer. Theseus, her husband, banishes and ultimately kills his son, although the truth is revealed and their relationship reconciled before Hippolytus finally dies. However, a more recent version of the subject had been written by Racine in 1677, and was performed and celebrated during Cabanel's life. Sylvain Amic suggests that, because of the contemporary attention to the play, Cabanel was likely trying to revive an interest in antiquity among progressive artists who preferred contemporary subjects.

The Salon program's description of Phaedra contained an excerpt from Euripides' classical play: "Consumed with love's sorrow, Phaedra has locked herself in her palace. A delicate veil covers her head. This is the third day she has gone without food as she is intent on ending her wretched existence." This excerpt places Cabanel's Phaedra in a weakened and emotional moment, in contrast to the often heroic and instructive works of the Academy. While Cabanel opposed new, anti-academic modes of painting, such as Impressionism, he attempted to reconcile his artistic ideals with the artistic developments of his time.

== Rome and theatricality ==
This work relays a certain level of theatricality, which can be attributed to the main source of the work being a play, but also to the result of Cabanel's time spent painting in Italy. Cabanel received the Prix de Rome award for his accomplishments in history painting in 1845. He spent the next five years in Rome, absorbing the dramatic Renaissance and Baroque works that permeate the city. Upon his return to Paris, Cabanel was commissioned to help decorate the Salon des Cariatides in the Hôtel de Ville. The final work was destroyed, but his cartoons show influences of Michelangelo's heroic and thoughtful figures of the Sistine Chapel ceiling, Raphael's introspective philosophers and mathematicians of the School of Athens, and the theatrical compositions and movement of Annibale Carracci's Farnese Gallery decorations. These cartoons are evidence of the effect that Roman works of the past had on Cabanel. The heroic figures are absent from Phaedra, but there is an air of brooding tension and drama that can reasonably be attributed to his influence by the Renaissance and Baroque masters.

== Elements from his past works ==
Cabanel incorporates various elements of his earlier works into Phaedra, namely the aforementioned dramatic literature (see Subject), portraiture, and the female nude.

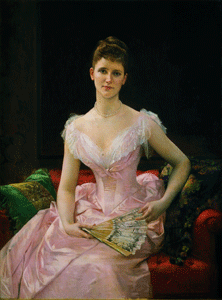
Alexandre Cabanel, Olivia Peyton Murray Cutting, 1887. Oil on canvas, 276 x 149 cm. Museum of the City of New York.

Cabanel produced many works of portraiture throughout his painting career. His soft and precise depictions of women were very popular among the upper classes, establishing the artist as a viable resource for beautiful likenesses. In his painting Olivia Peyton Murray Cutting, Cabanel utilized a dark background in order to emphasize the light skin of the woman. Her dress is shiny and ornate, scrunched up where the fabric meets the furniture. Her chair and pillows are lavish and decorated, adding a luxurious effect. These elements can all be seen in Phaedra in the dark background illuminating her pale body, the luscious fabrics that shine and ripple, and the opulent luxury of her bedchamber's adornments.

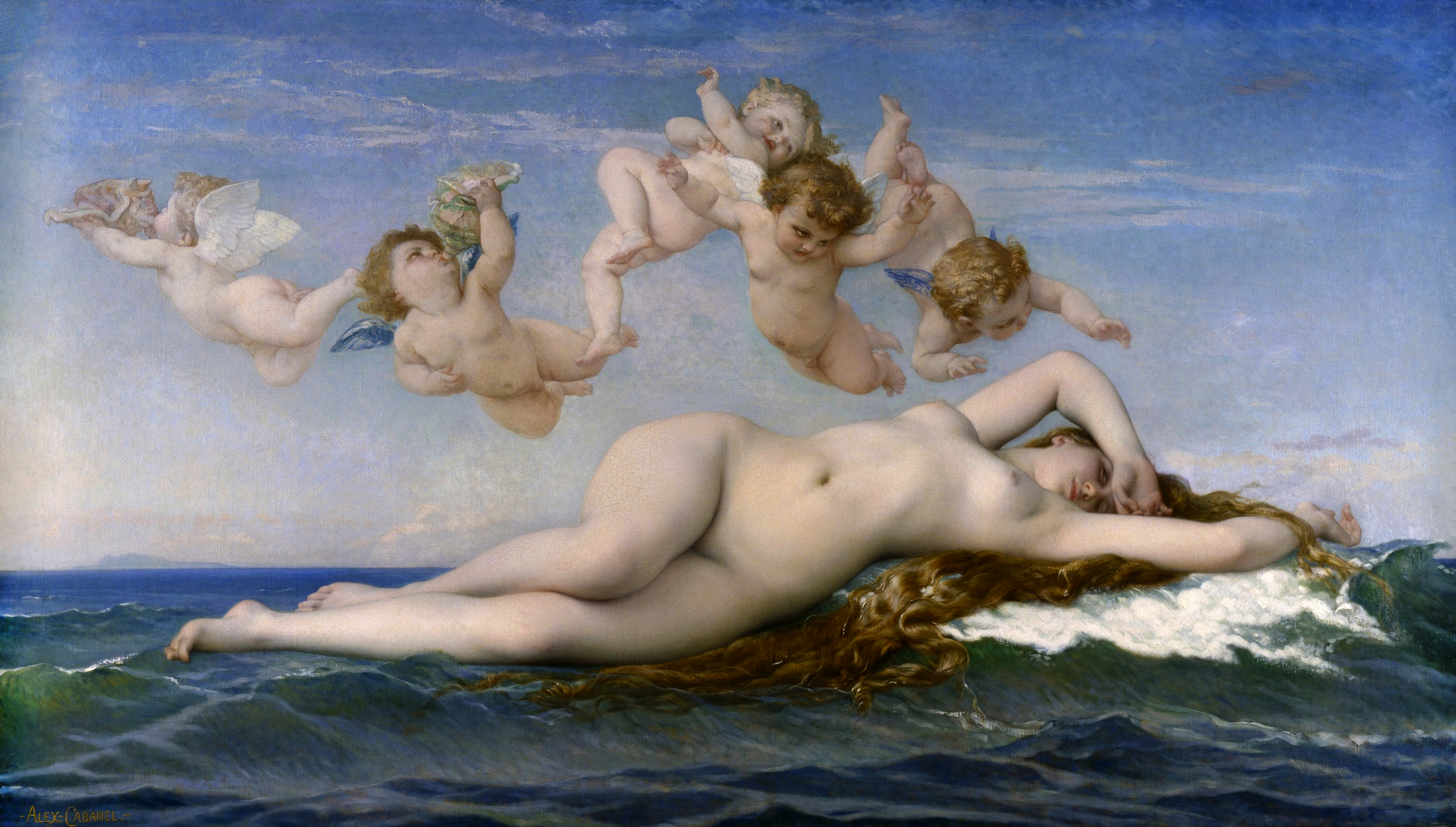
Alexandre Cabanel, Birth of Venus, 1863. Oil on canvas, 130 x 225 cm. Musée d'Orsay, Paris.

Cabanel's most famous female nude figure is his Birth of Venus. This work shows a reclining female nude with her hands above her head, harkening back to Titian's Bacchanal of the Andrians. Her sexualized pose emphasizes the erotic nature of Venus, while her overlapped legs suggest a soft modesty. While Phaedra is not overtly sexual, she is a horizontal nude whose character is associated with lustful love, showing continuity between Cabanel's past works and this one.

== Critical reception ==
Cabanel reached the height of his popularity when he showed the Birth of Venus, receiving critical acclaim for its innovation and beauty, recognizable even by Napoleon III who purchased the work. However, by the time he painted Phaedra, admiration for his style had dramatically lessened. Critics called the work lackluster and confusing. This was likely due to the odd mixture of Cabanel's wish to please the public while retaining the academic style and adding a personal, unique perspective. Academic critics thought Cabanel's portrayal of the classical Phaedra in a weak state was unbefitting, and his composition boring, especially in contrast to the luxurious setting. The avant-gardists completely rejected the academic style as a part of their struggle for artistic progression. Further, his public was either strictly academic or progressive, so Cabanel's in-between style appeared flat and uninteresting to his contemporaries. Even after his death in 1889, later critics looked back on Cabanel's works with disdain. Camille Mauclair in The Great French Painters described other of Cabanel's works from the Salon of 1880 as "unpleasant", "without life or emotion", and "pictures that do not take their proper place in the building". Phaedra can be seen as a culmination of the artist's practices and experiences melding together as a retrospective of his past, while struggling to retain a foothold in a changing art world.
