= Pierre Capdevielle =

Pierre Capdevielle may refer to:

- Pierre Capdevielle (musician) (1906–1969), French conductor, composer, and music critic
- Pierre Capdevielle (rugby union) (born 1974), French rugby union footballer

== See also ==
- Pierre Capdeville (1908–1980), French entomologist
