= The Glorification of Saint Louis =

Painting by Alexandre Cabanel

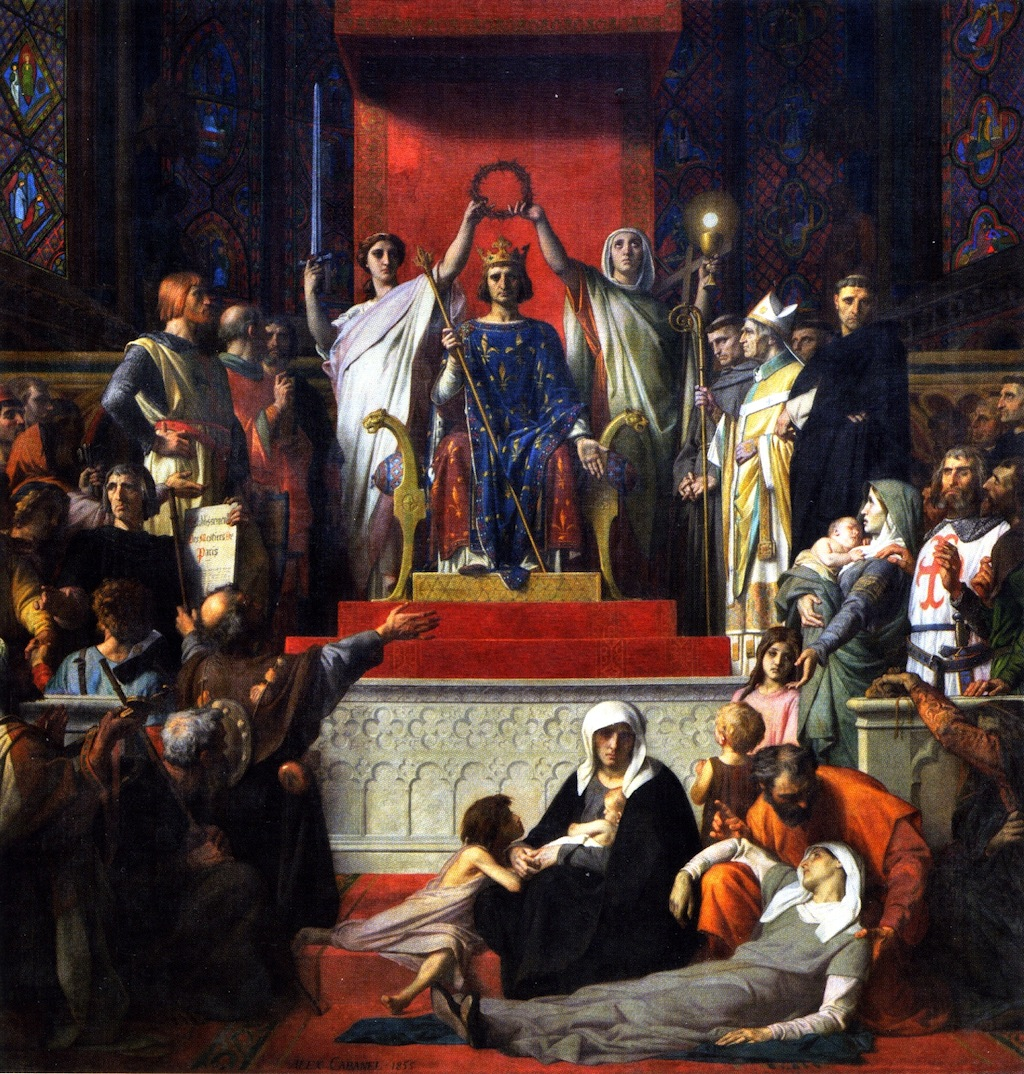
- Artist: Alexandre Cabanel
- Year: 1853
- Type: Oil on canvas, history painting
- Dimensions: 442 cm × 432 cm (174 in × 170 in)
- Location: Palace of Versailles; Versailles

The Glorification of Saint Louis (French: La Glorification de Saint Louis) is an oil on canvas large allegorical history painting by the French artist Alexandre Cabanel, from 1853.

It depicts the thirteenth century French monarch Louis IX, known for his participation in the Seventh Crusade and his death during the Eighth Crusade. He was elevated to sainthood by the Catholic Church. He sits in a throne, with a laurel crown displayed above his head. He appears surrounded by members of clergy and nobility.

The painting was first displayed at the Salon of 1855, held at the Palace of Industry in Paris during the Universal Exposition. It was commissioned for 8,000 francs for the chapel of the Château de Vincennes, a historic residence of the king. In 1862 it appeared at the International Exhibition in London. Today is in the collection of the Museum of French History at the Palace of Versailles.

== Bibliography ==
- Jordan, William Chester. Ideology and Royal Power in Medieval France: Kingship, Crusades and the Jews. Taylor & Francis, 2024.
- Ventura, Gal. Maternal Breast-Feeding and Its Substitutes in Nineteenth-Century French Art. BRILL, 2018.
