= Albaydé =

Painting by Alexandre Cabanel

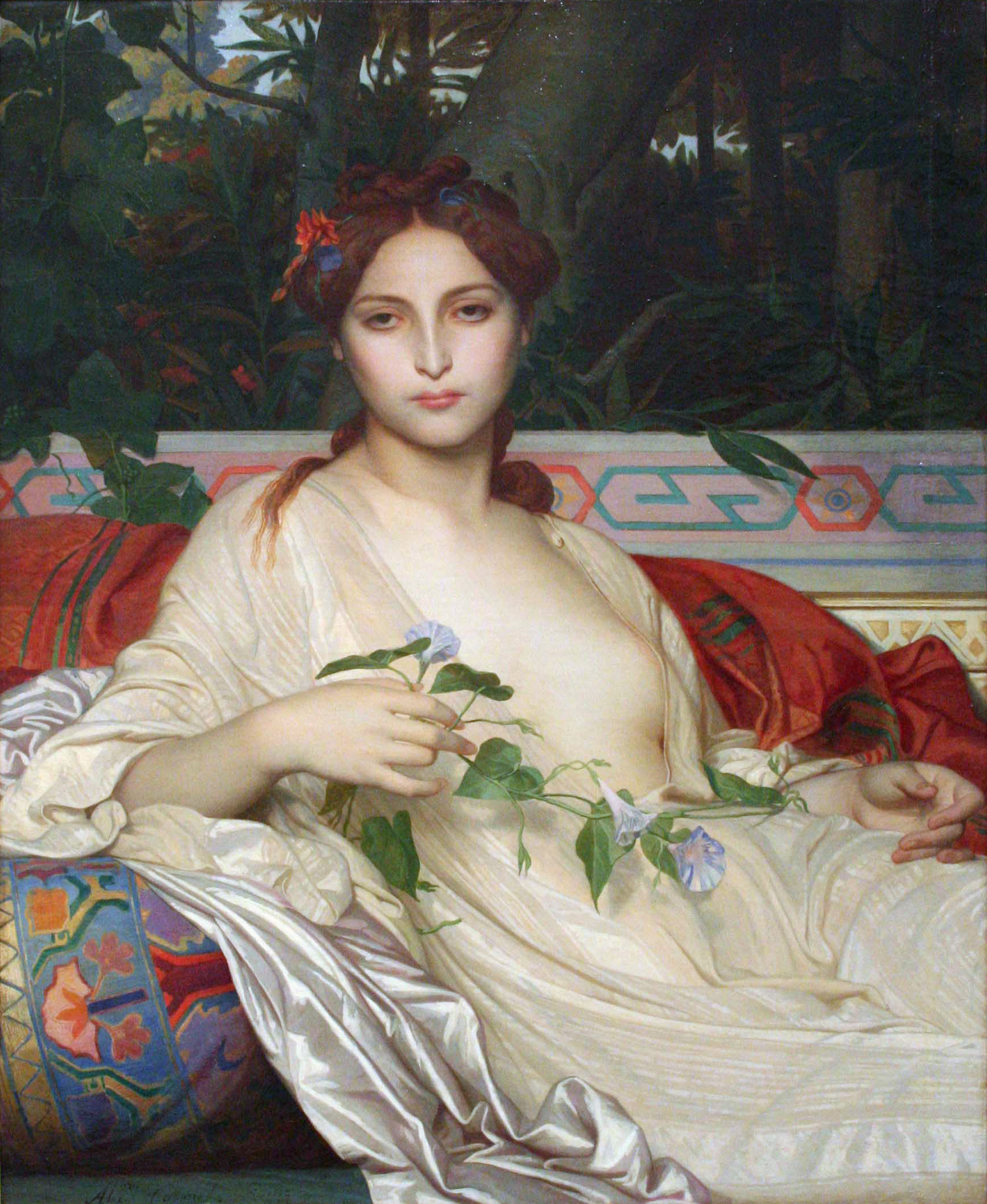
- Artist: Alexandre Cabanel
- Year: 1848
- Medium: oil on canvas
- Dimensions: 90 cm × 80.5 cm (35 in × 31.7 in)
- Location: Musée Fabre, Montpellier

Albaydé is an oil on canvas painting by French artist Alexandre Cabanel, from 1848. It is held at the Musée Fabre, in Montpellier.

== History and description ==
The painting was made when the artist was living in Rome. It depicts a girl dressed in a low-cut blouse set against dense vegetation. The subject is Albaydé, which translates to "The white one (female)" in Arabic, a character from Victor Hugo’s collection of poems, Les Orientales, about the Greek War of Independence. Her premature death at the age of fifteen is recounted in his poem "Les Tronçons du serpent".

In the orientalist style, she is portrayed in a seductive way, as a reclining odalisque, dressed in a simple gown, on a harem divan, holding a blooming bindweed flower. She was actually a slave held prisioner there. Her expression seems absent and the excessive whiteness of her skin seems to anticipate her premature death.

== Provenance ==
Donated by Alfred Bruyas in 1868, the artwork is housed in the Musée Fabre in Montpellier.
