= Louis Capdevielle =

French painter

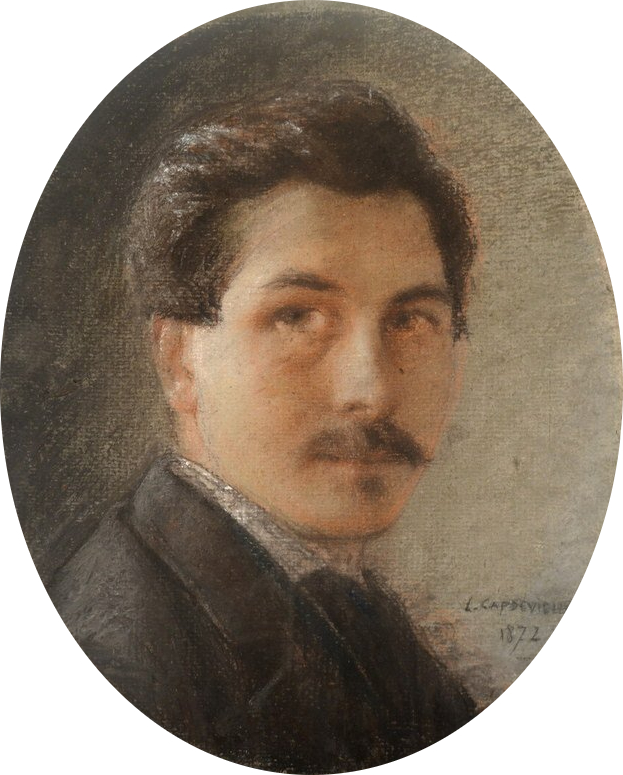
Self-portrait (1872)

Louis Antoine Capdevielle (9 May 1849, Lourdes - 27 July 1905, Lourdes) was a French genre painter.

== Biography ==
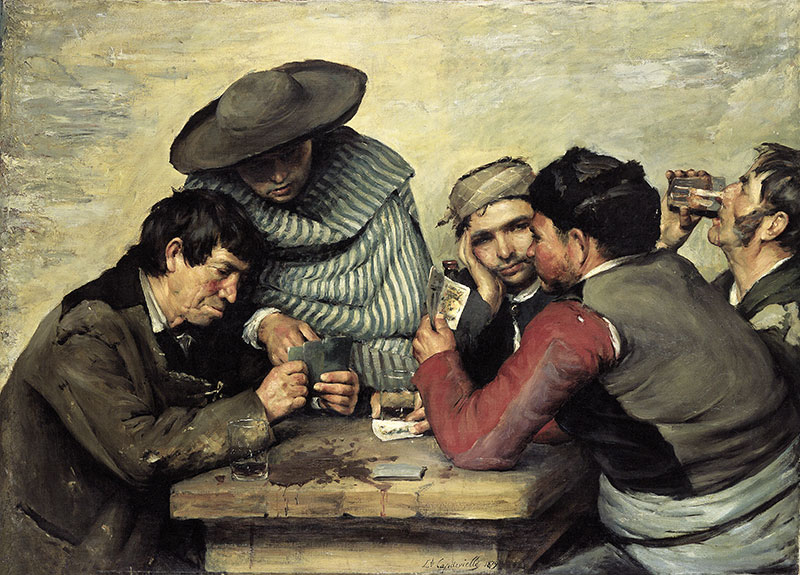
Spaniards

His father was a slate quarrier. He showed an early talent for drawing and took lessons from a local artist named Couthouly before enrolling at the École nationale supérieure des Beaux-Arts in 1868, with financial assistance from a local magistrate (coincidentally also named Capdevielle, although not related) and a subsidy from the Lourdes Municipal Council.

His primary instructor there was the painter and sculptor, Aimé Millet. In 1870, absorbed in his studies, he neglected to present himself for the sortition at the beginning of the Franco-Prussian War. As a result, he was arbitrarily assigned to an infantry regiment and served in the Armée de la Loire.

After being demobilized, he returned to the École; pursuing studies with Alexandre Cabanel and Léon Bonnat. He got married in 1873 and, the following year, had his first showing at the Salon. In 1876, he was awarded a travel grant to study in Spain and displayed the works he created there at the Salon of 1877.

His wife died prematurely in 1878, shortly after he had been called up for a new round of military exercises. He remarried in 1880 and one of his sons from this marriage, Raoul (1880–1910), also became a painter.

In 1886, anticipating a special "Salon Triennal", he obtained a grant from the city of Lourdes to create a large canvas depicting the Miracle in the Grotto. Despite his working continuously for a year, it was not ready in time. Faced with a stalled career and chronic financial problems, he returned to Lourdes in 1890.

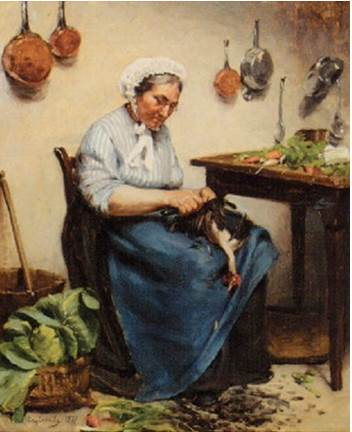
Plucking a Chicken

Once settled there, he turned to portrait painting. Most of his sitters were from the local bourgeoisie, but he also painted Émile Zola, during his visit there in 1892 to do research for his novel Lourdes. About that same time, he met Cyprien Pintat, a restaurant and hotel owner from Luz-Saint-Sauveur. He and his prominent Andorran family became major patrons.

Apart from brief trips to Spain and London, he lived a quiet life in the Hautes-Pyrénées until his death in 1905.

== Sources ==
- Jean Cambon, Un grand peintre bigourdan, Louis Antoine Capdevielle 1849-1905, Académie de Lourdes 2001
- Jean Cassou and Geneviève Marsan, Louis Capdevielle, Société Académique des Hautes-Pyrénées, Musée Pyrénéen ISBN 2-9520538-0-4
- Pierre Pintat, La légende de "La Fée du Lac", 2010, 142 p., ISBN 2-9526249-6-8
