= Nymph and Satyr (Cabanel) =

Painting by Alexandre Cabanel

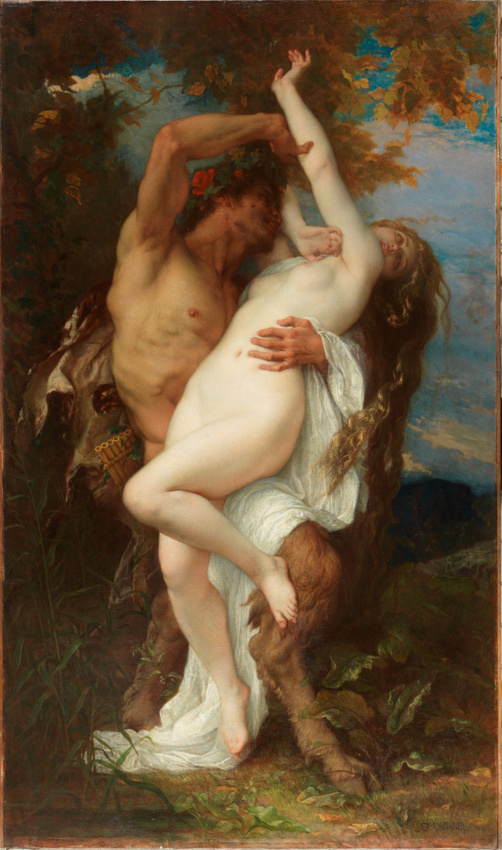
- Artist: Alexandre Cabanel
- Year: 1860
- Medium: Oil on canvas
- Dimensions: 240 cm × 140 cm (94 in × 55 in)
- Location: Palais des Beaux-Arts de Lille, Lille

Nymph and Satyr is an oil on canvas painting by French painter Alexandre Cabanel, made in 1860. It is owned by the Musée d'Orsay, in Paris, but it is on loan in the Palais des Beaux-Arts de Lille.

== History ==
The painting was exhibited at the Salon of Paris of 1861, and was for a long time kept in the private collection of the French royal family. In fact, it was bought the same year, when Emperor Napoleon III was visiting the Salon, he immediately decided to buy it and spent in the purchase 15,000 francs.

== Description ==
The canvas depicts a satyr while attempting to kidnap a nymph in a forest, of which only part of the lawn and foliage can be glimpsed, in a clear reference to the Greek mythology so admired by the artist. In the nude depiction of the nymph, its noticeable the same complexion and elegance, in her pale skin, physical shapes and hair color, of the Venus that appears in his famous painting The Birth of Venus. Cabanel also shows the typical features of a Greek satyr, with his goat's legs, man's bust and with a classic pan flute tied alongside.

It is unclear whether the depiction is of a kidnapping on the part of the satyr or rather a mutual encounter, with the nymph's facial expression and body language reading ambiguously as either ecstasy or distress.
