= Thamar (Cabanel) =

Painting by Alexandre Cabanel

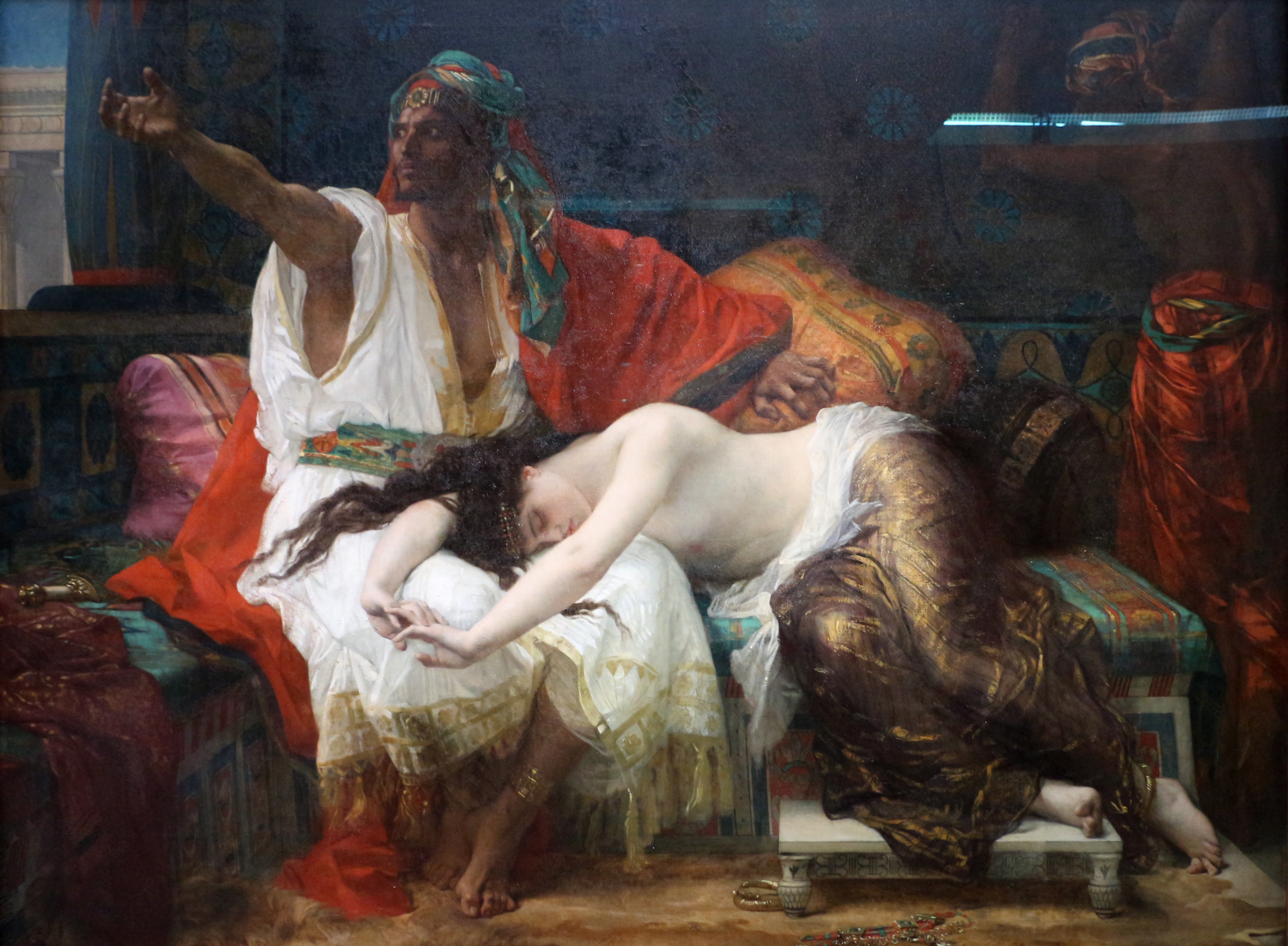
- Artist: Alexandre Cabanel
- Year: 1875
- Medium: Oil on canvas
- Dimensions: 180 cm × 248 cm (71 in × 98 in)
- Location: Musée d'Orsay, Paris

Thamar, sometimes also called Tamar and Absalom is a painting by Alexandre Cabanel. It was first exhibited at the Salon of 1875 and is currently in the Musée d'Orsay, Paris.

== Provenance ==
The painting was purchased by the French Ministry of Education from the 1875 salon for the Musée du Luxembourg where it remained until 1892. Transferred to the Louvre, it remained there until 1927. Then from 1927 to 2013 it was exhibited at the Musée des Beaux-Arts de Nice before being transferred to the Musée d'Orsay in Paris.

The painting became widely known through an 1878 lithograph printed by Charles Baude for "The chefs-d'oeuvre d'art of the International exhibition," by Earl Shinn. A lithograph printed in colour was published in Le Petit Journal on 4 February 1893 and there were many other copies and reproductions.

== Composition ==
In this work, Cabanel depicts a dramatic episode in the biblical tale of Tamar and Absalom (2 Samuel 13). Tamar, daughter of King David, has just been raped by her half-brother Amnon and thrown out of his house. She has fled in distress to her brother Absalom who comforts her and vows revenge.

The composition gave Cabanel scope to demonstrate his skill at rendering textiles and interiors, as well as for portraiture and the expressive use of the body. The interior setting includes a black female attendant in the right background wearing a scarf around her head and fabric around her waist. Her arms are raised and pressed against the wall, suggesting anguish in response to Tamar's plight.

Tamar herself has rended her garments in anguish and now swoons over Absalom’s knees with her arms extended, fingers entwined, her eyes closed and her head buried in shame. Her legs are covered in translucent gauze and fine silk and her feet rest on a low stool.

Above her, sitting on a divan decorated with Assyrian motifs, Absalom reaches out with his right palm up and fingers curling while he grips a cushion with his left hand. As he gazes into the distance imagining his revenge, his dark eyes glare with fury, his mouth trembles with rage against his half-brother.

One notable contrast in the painting is between Tamar’s very white skin and the very Arab appearance of her brother, just as her gentle and delicate form contrasts with the robust masculine physique of her brother. Indeed Cabanel used a study he had painted of an Arab for the head of Absalom.

The painting technique is particularly vigorous for the artist, and there is some evidence of overcleaning on the lower part of Tamar’s torso, making that part of the canvas harder to interpret.

== Exhibition history ==
- 1875 – Salon – Palais des Champs Elysées, Paris
- 1878 – Exposition Universelle – Palais du Trocadéro, Paris
- 1883 – Internationalen Kunstausstellung – Glaspalast, Munich
- 1979 – Chers maîtres & Cie – Peintures françaises de 1818 à 1914 dans les collections des musées de Nice – Galerie des Ponchettes, Nice
- 1982 – Od Courbeta k Cezannovi – National Gallery Prague
- 1982 – Od Courbeta k Cézannovi. Obrazy z let 1848–1886 ze sbírek francouzských muzeí- Valdstejnska Jizdarna, Prague,
- 1982-3 – de: Von Courbet bis Cézanne – Französische Malerei 1848–1886 – National Gallery, Berlin
- 2010–11 – Alexandre Cabanel, la tradition du beau – Musée Fabre, Montpellier
- 2011 – Alexandre Cabanel. Die Tradition des Schönen – Wallraf–Richartz Museum & Fondation Corboud, Cologne
- 2014 – Musée d'Orsay. Capolavori – Victor Emmanuel II Monument, Rome
- 2015 – El canto del cisne. Pinturas académicas del Salón de Paris. Colecciones Musée d'Orsay- es: Fundación Mapfre, Madrid
- 2017–18 – Gefeiert und verspottet : französische Malerei 1820–1880 – Kunsthaus Zürich
- 2026 – Youssef Nabil. De rêver encore- Musée d'Orsay, Paris

== Critical reception ==
Critical views on the work were very divided. fr:Théodore Véron was fulsome in his praise, describing it as a splendid tableau full of drama, feeling, expression, pain, and a richness of fabrics, combined with an original style that surpassed the efforts of Renaissance artists. Albert Patin de La Fizelière described the work as a masterpiece of grand style, noting the exquisite qualities of Tamar’s attitude, movement and expression and summing up the composition as both touching and energetic.

Georges Dufour said that Cabanel had put all of his creative energy unto this work, which, if perhaps not perfect, was very interesting. The posing of Tamar lacks nothing in natural quality or suppleness; Absalom’s expression might be criticised as too academic and lacking in immediacy, but as he reminds us, Absalom concealed his desire for vengeance for two years before the murder if Amnin, so an overly expressive face would not have been appropriate.

The fr:Bibliothèque universelle et revue suisse took a balanced but broadly positive view. It noted that the work had been criticised for its abundance of visually distracting background detail and for its clash of colours with obscure darker areas. These criticisms were less valid in the author’s view than the overly theatrical posing of Absalom; one might expect the tragic verse of Voltaire from him rather than deadly revenge.

Some felt that the garish medley of different colours in the painting was a fault, while the composition overall seemed staged and too deliberate. As a result the work neither pleased the eye nor satisfied the spirit. Jules Arsène Arnaud Claretie described the painting as a violent effort to attract attention with intense but flashy colours, which he described as a “biblical polychromy.” In his view the black woman in the background, whom he described as an ‘inevitable’ element in oriental scenes, was the best drawn figure in the work.

Georges Street commented that although the exhibition catalogue tells us that Tamar was “withered with troubles and pain”, her languorous manner seemed quite at odds with this description. He also noted that Absalom hardly seemed to take much interest in his sister’s misfortune as he is depicted turning away from her. The Spectator described it tersely as “a very inferior painting.” William Wetmore Story wrote that in this painting, Cabanel had “failed to rise to the dignity of history or the tragedy of his subjects.” He described it as “forcibly feeble, exaggerated in action and falsely conceived. It is impossible to recognise Thamar in the half-naked woman in Absalon’s lap, and it is equally difficult to recognise Absalom in the modern, violent, scowling and overdressed Oriental who is clutching the air in so impotent a rage. There is nothing Biblical in the sentiment, the character or the facts of this picture. It is rather like a modern harem.”

L’Union médicale was even more scathing.

”if Absalom could see how much Cabanel had violated the form of his unfortunate sister, he would have raised his left hand to the same height as his right against the misguided painter. The exposed areas of Tamar are as badly drawn as possible and the line of her neck and shoulder is completely unbelievable. Her entire body is devoid of expression with its pasty tone.”

Emile Zola was one of Cabanel’s harshest and most enduring critics. Of Thamar he said:

”[Cabanel] can be original with discretion. He is not of the party of ferocious persons who go to excess. He is always decent. He is always classical after all, he never scandalizes the public, deviating so violently from the conventional ideal. In one of his paintings exhibited this year, he confessed everything. The title is Thamar. Tamar, insulted by Amnon, weeps on the lap of her brother Absalom. The painting depicts a half-naked woman. She sobs, her head hidden in the lap of a man who is also half-naked. Cabanel wanted to shine through the perfection of his craft and eclipse Delacroix. He painted a room of rare oriental splendor, with tapestries, jewels, and lighting effects. For added depth, he placed a Black woman in the background. And all these efforts come to nothing: the painting remains pretentious and characterless. It doesn't even strike the eye. The gray stamp of the government is applied to all the figures and washes them out. It is a composition without flaw or merit; the most deadly mediocrity speaks through it; it is an art composed of all the old formulas, renewed by the skillful hand of an apprentice craftsman.”
