= Cleopatra Testing Poisons on Condemned Prisoners =

Painting by Alexandre Cabanel, 1887

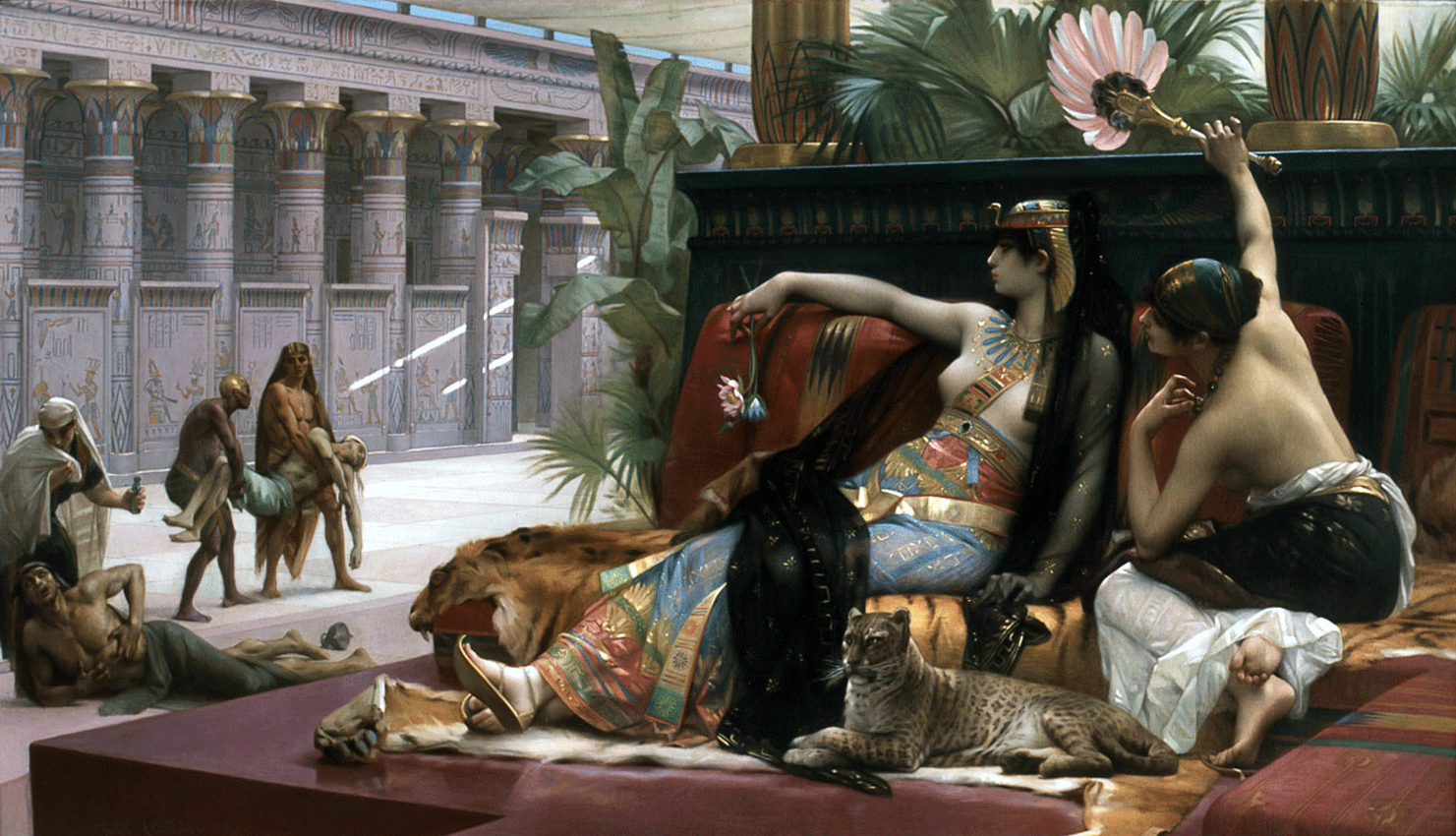
- Artist: Alexandre Cabanel
- Year: 1887
- Medium: oil on canvas
- Dimensions: 165 cm × 290 cm (65 in × 110 in)
- Location: Royal Museum of Fine Arts, Antwerp

Cleopatra Testing Poisons on Condemned Prisoners (Cléopâtre essayant des poisons sur des condamnés à mort) is an 1887 painting by the French artist Alexandre Cabanel. It is held by the Royal Museum of Fine Arts Antwerp. It shows Cleopatra VII reclining on a banquette and observing the effects of poisons on prisoners condemned to death, as described in Plutarch's biography of Mark Antony. It is considered a canonical work of 19th-century orientalism and has been used as a model for plays and early films.

Cabanel had always had a taste for historical and orientalist themes and when the painting was first seen by the Parisian public he was fêted by the critics and showered with honours. Several international collectors attempted to buy the painting.

== Description ==
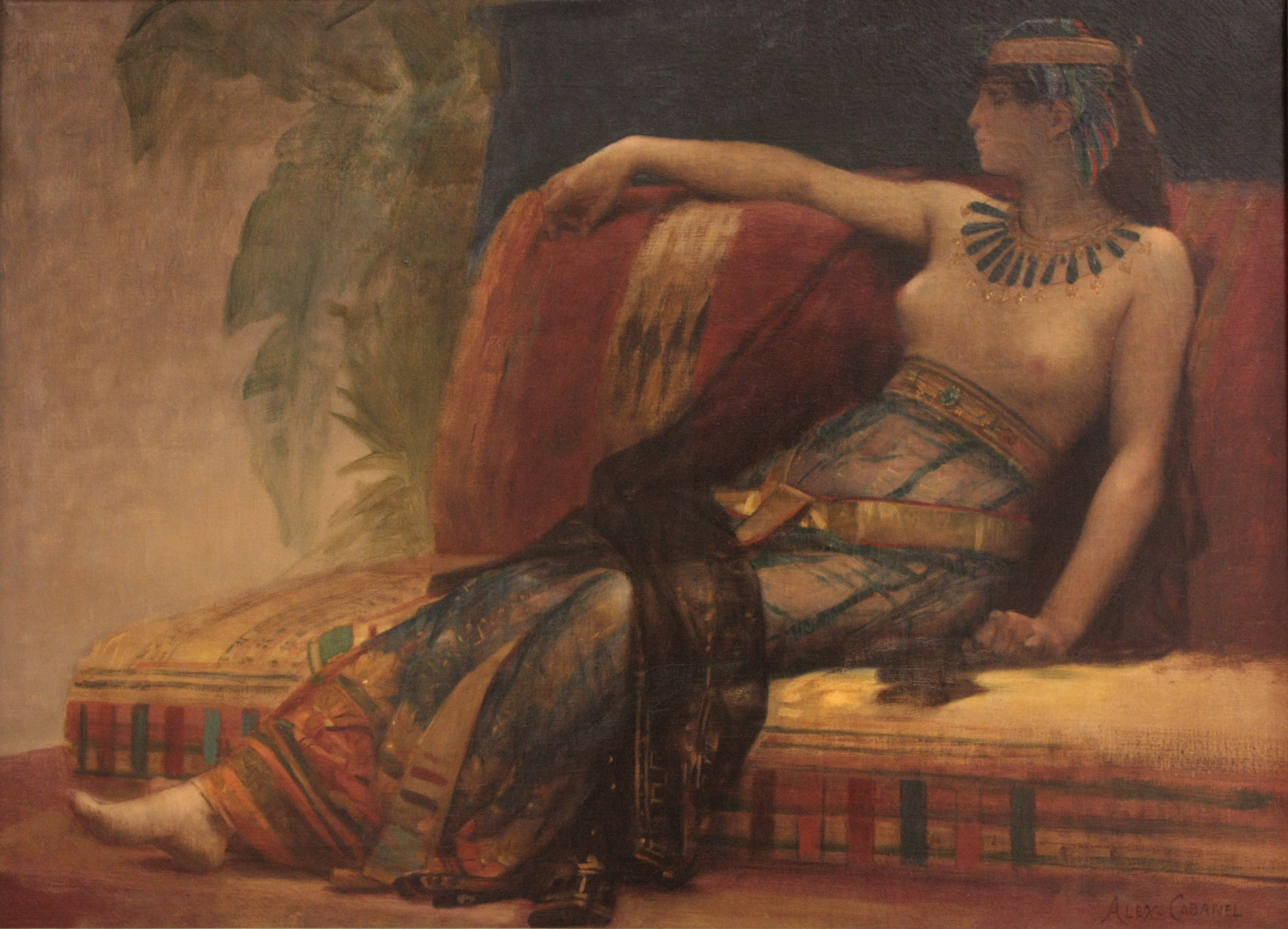
Study for the painting (Musée des Beaux-Arts de Béziers).

The painting has two parts, and it presents in the foreground Queen Cleopatra seated on a bench on which have been placed fabrics and a tiger skin whose head has been preserved. Seen in profile, she recalls Ancient Egyptian paintings. Cleopatra wears the Néret crown which was the regalia of Egyptian queens since the 4th dynasty. This crown represents a vulture: the bird's head juts out slightly above her forehead while the wings frame her face. Placed on the right side of the canvas, the queen is accompanied by a largely undressed courtesan waving a fly swatter. At her feet lies a majestic leopard, an animal whose company Cleopatra was reportedly very fond.

To the left of the painting is the second plane which contrasts with the sensuous pose of the queen. It depicts people who were condemned to death, who writhe in pain under the effect of the poisons given to them. A woman stands with a bottle of poison in her right hand, above a slave who just took it, holding his stomach, with his face marked by suffering. Behind them, two men carry the corpse of a condemned man, who died of poisoning. The cruelty of the scene is reinforced by the splendor of the palace where these atrocities are committed. In full light, at the feet of sumptuously colored hieroglyphs, slaves are being killed just to improve the quality of the Queen's poisons.

Cleopatra watches the scene from afar. Her gaze has been described as cold and indifferent to the pain of these dying slaves.

A first version of the painting of smaller dimensions was produced by the painter in 1883 and submitted to the sponsors for approval. This completed study, kept in a private collection, was presented at the exhibition "Flower Power", at the Museum of Impressionisms, in Giverny.

A preparatory study for the painting, with the figure of Cleopatra, is kept at the Béziers Museum of Fine Arts.
