= The Fallen Angel (painting) =

Painting by Alexandre Cabanel

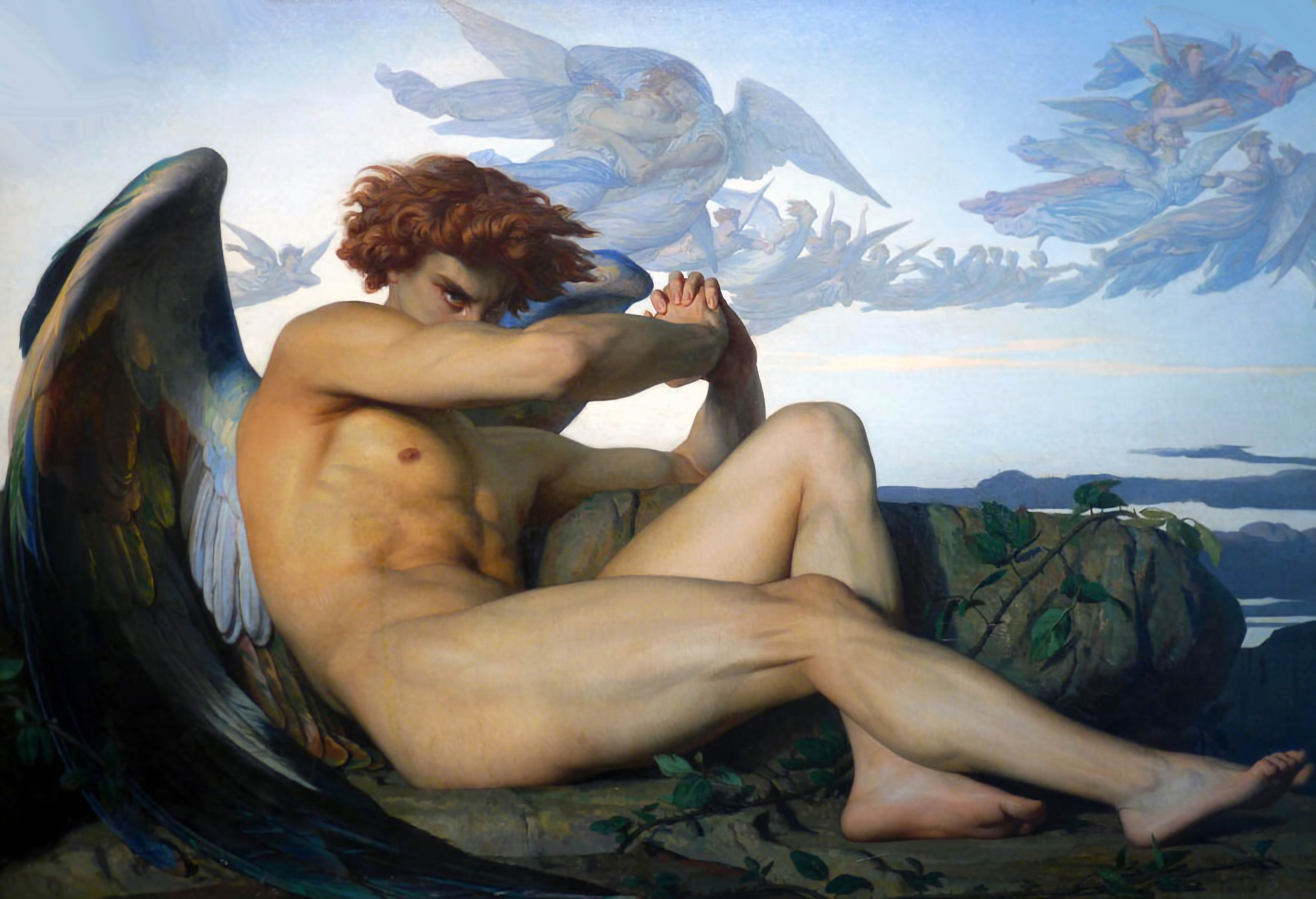
- Artist: Alexandre Cabanel
- Year: 1847
- Medium: oil on canvas
- Dimensions: 120.50 cm × 196.50 cm (47.44 in × 77.36 in)
- Location: Musée Fabre, Montpellier

The Fallen Angel (French: L'Ange déchu) is a painting by the French artist Alexandre Cabanel. It was painted in 1847, when the artist was 24 years old, and depicts the Devil after his fall from Heaven. The painting is at the Musée Fabre in Montpellier.

== History and description ==
In 1845, while he was at the National School of Fine Arts, Cabanel won the second Grand Prix de Rome, which allowed him to move to Italy for a few years. Like all the other residents, he had to send paintings back regularly to testify the progress he was making during his stay in Rome. It was in this context that he painted The Fallen Angel, in 1847. Cabanel opted for a subject not often represented in French painting: the fall from Heaven of the Fallen Angel, who went on to become the Devil.

Depicting an angel expelled from heaven by God, the painting shows an enraged Lucifer, with his hands crossed and tears running from his eyes. He lies on the ground, naked, while angels fly in the sky above to show the glory of God.

Cabanel painted the work at the Villa Médicis in Rome as his second official envoi to Paris.

The painting has been in the collection of the Musée Fabre since 1889. The Musée Fabre collection record gives the unframed dimensions as 120.50 × 196.50 cm (framed: 160 × 223 cm).

== Analysis ==
A Romantic work, the figure of Lucifer is shown as a nude, handsome young man reclining, hands clasped, his face partially obscured by his arm. His wings are mostly white at the scapulars but dappled with blue and gold, while the primary feathers are a rich dark navy that blends into the dark foreground. A thorny blackberry vine trails behind his legs and near his feet. In the sky numerous less detailed angels are in flight all moving in the same direction Lucifer faces. Lucifer glares out angrily from behind his arm, tears visible in his eyes.

In Rome, Cabanel meditated at length on the theme of the fallen angel. In this depiction, the angel is dressed in a large drape and faces the viewer.

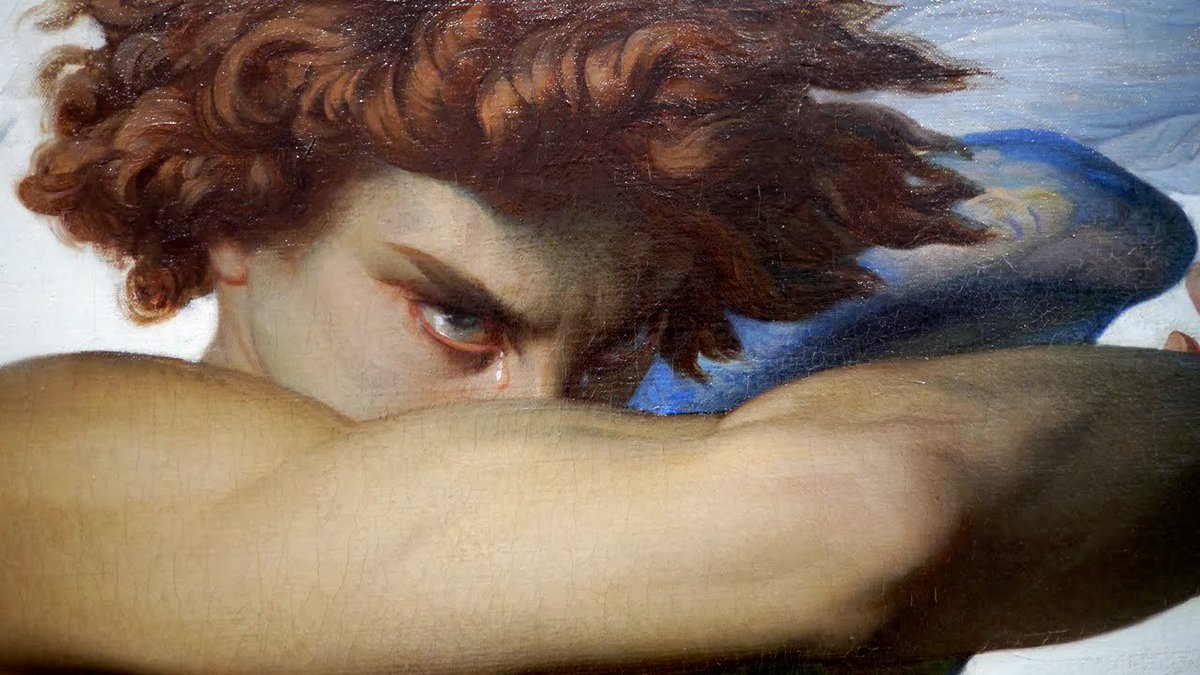
Detail, depicting Lucifer in a state of rage.

== See also ==
- Anakin Skywalker
