= Alexandre Cabanel =

French painter (1823–1889)

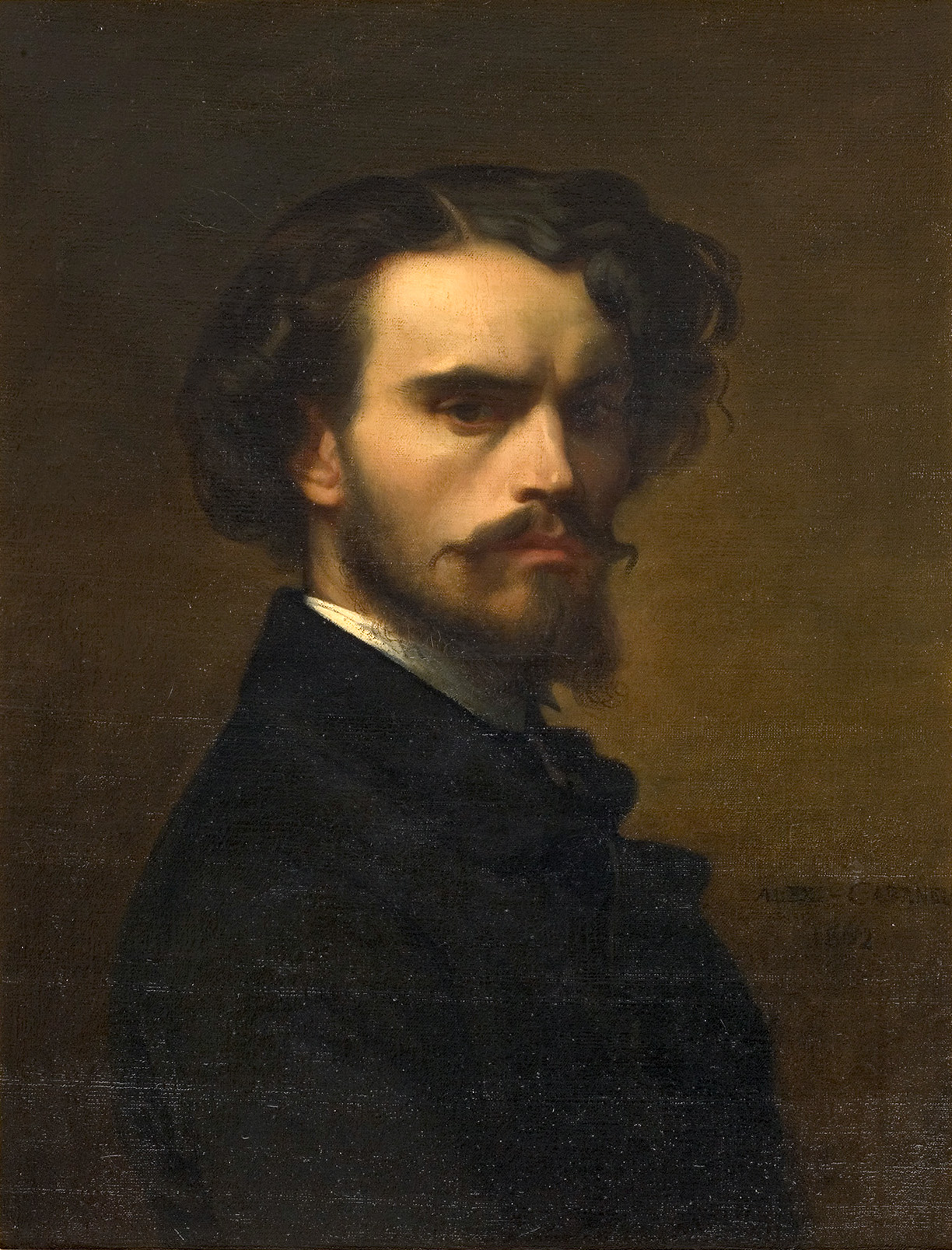
- Self-Portrait, 1852, Musée Fabre
- Born: 28 September 1823; Montpellier, France
- Died: 23 January 1889 (aged 65); Paris, France
- Education: François-Édouard Picot
- Known for: Painting
- Notable work: Birth of Venus; The Fallen Angel
- Movement: Academicism
- Awards: Prix de Rome

Signature
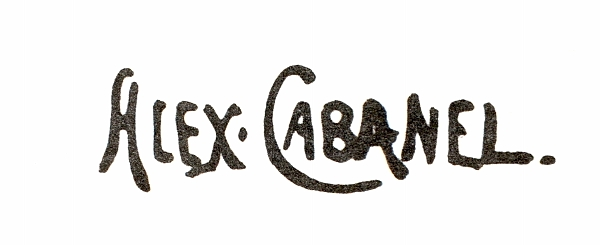

Alexandre Cabanel (French: [alɛksɑ̃dʁ(ə) kabanɛl]; 28 September 1823 – 23 January 1889) was a French painter. He painted historical, classical and religious subjects in the academic style. He was also well known as a portrait painter. He was Napoleon III's preferred painter and, with Gérôme and Meissonier, was one of "the three most successful artists of the Second Empire."

== Career ==
Cabanel was the son of a modest carpenter, and he began his apprenticeship at the Montpellier School of Fine Arts in the class of Charles Matet, curator of the Musée Fabre. Equipped with a scholarship, he moved to Paris in 1839.

Cabanel entered the École des Beaux-Arts in Paris at the age of seventeen, in 1840, where he studied with François-Édouard Picot.

After two failures, with the paintings Cincinnatus receiving the ambassadors of Rome, in 1843, and Christ in the Garden of Olives, in 1844, he won the Prix de Rome scholarship, in 1845 at the age of 22. He would be a resident of the Villa Medici until 1850.

Cabanel was both a history painter and a genre painter, and he evolved over the years towards romantic themes, like Albaydé (1848), inspired by Les Orientales, by Victor Hugo (1829).

He received the insignia of knight of the Legion of Honor, in 1855.

Also in 1855, he married Marie-Clémentine Legrand, with whom he had three children. Legrand and two of the children died in 1867. He remarried in 1869, but his second wife also died just four years later.

He gained more recognition with The Birth of Venus, exhibited at the Salon of 1863, and which was immediately purchased by Napoleon III for his personal collection. The acclaimed painting entered the Luxembourg Museum, in 1881, and is now held at the Musée d'Orsay, in Paris. He signed a contract with the Goupil house for the marketing of engraved reproductions of this painting. There is a smaller replica, painted in 1875 for a banker, John Wolf, now at the Metropolitan Museum of Art, in New York City. It was offered to the museum by Wolf in 1893. The classical composition embodies ideals of Academic art: a mythological subject, graceful modeling, silky brushwork, and perfected forms. This style was perennially popular with collectors, even as when it was challenged by artists seeking a more realistic approach, such as Gustave Courbet. He was also criticized by writers and critics like Émile Zola and Joris-Karl Huysmans, who were more open to the modern artistic tendencies.

== French Academy of Fine Arts ==
Cabanel was elected a member of the Academy of Fine Arts in the 10th chair, in 1863. He was appointed professor at the École des Beaux-Arts in 1864, where he taught until his death. He was in the same year promoted to the rank of officer of the Legion of Honor.

Between 1868 and 1888, he was a member of the Salon jury seventeen times: "He was elected regularly to the Salon jury and his pupils could be counted by the hundred at the Salons. Through them, Cabanel did more than any other artist of his generation to form the character of the belle époque French painting". His refusal together with William-Adolphe Bouguereau to allow the impressionist painter Édouard Manet, and other painters, to exhibit their work in the Salon of 1863 led to the establishment of the Salon des Refusés by the French government. Cabanel won the Great Medal of Honour at the Salons of 1865, 1867, and 1878.

The Salon jury was not liberal, they accepted and promoted only academic-style paintings with the intention of securing this art in the memory of the public for eternity. Cabanel intervened in 1881 during the presentation of Pertuiset, Le chasseur de lions, by Édouard Manet, and defended it by saying: "Gentlemen, there is not one among us who is capable of doing a head like that in the open air!". At the Universal Exhibition of 1867, Cabanel was awarded the Knight's Cross of the First Class of the Order of Merit of Saint Michael of Bavaria, following his Paradise Lost, commissioned for the Maximilianeum, in Munich, by Ludwig II of Bavaria. He was promoted to the rank of Commander of the Legion of Honor in 1884, and was elected associate of the Royal Academy of Belgium on 6 January 1887.

He died on 23 January 1889, in his hotel at 14 rue Alfred de Vigny, in the 8th arrondissement of Paris. His funeral took place in Paris, on 26 January 1889, in the Saint-Philippe du Roule church, then his body was transported to Montpellier, where it was buried in the Saint-Lazare on 28 January 1889. A monument was erected to him in 1892 by the architect Jean Camille Formigé, decorated with a marble bust by Paul Dubois and a sculpture, Regret, by Antonin Mercié.

== Selected works ==
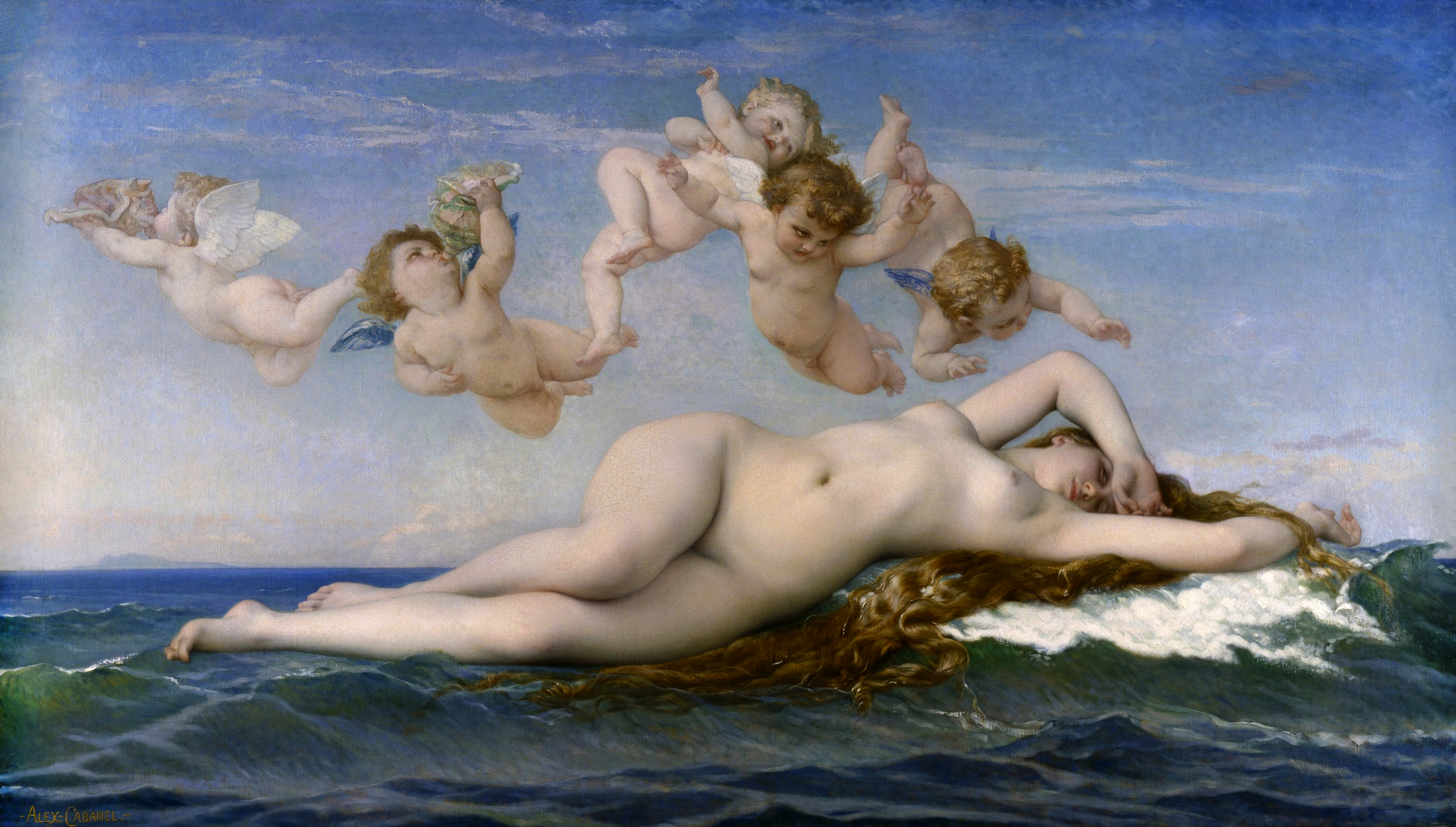
The Birth of Venus (1863)

- The Fallen Angel (L'ange déchu, 1847), Musée Fabre, Montpellier
- Aglaé and Boniface (Aglaé et Boniface, 1857), The Cleveland Museum of Art, Cleveland, Ohio US
- The Birth of Venus (La naissance de Vénus, 1863), Musée d'Orsay, Paris
- Napoleon III (1865), Musée national du château de Compiègne, Écouen, France
- The Death of Francesca da Rimini and Paolo Malatesta (La mort de Francesca de Rimini et de Paolo Malatesta, 1870), Musée d'Orsay, Paris
- Portrait de la comtesse de Keller (1873), Musée d'Orsay, Paris
- Thamar (1875)
- Phèdre (1880), Musée Fabre, Montpellier
- Ruth glanant dans les champs de Booz (1886), Musée Garinet, Châlons-en-Champagne
- Portrait de Mary Victoria Leiter (1887), Kedleston Hall, England
- Cleopatra Testing Poisons on Condemned Prisoners (Cléopâtre essayant des poisons sur des condamnés à mort, 1887), Royal Museum of Fine Arts, Antwerp
- Portrait of Napoleon III (Cabanel)

== Gallery ==
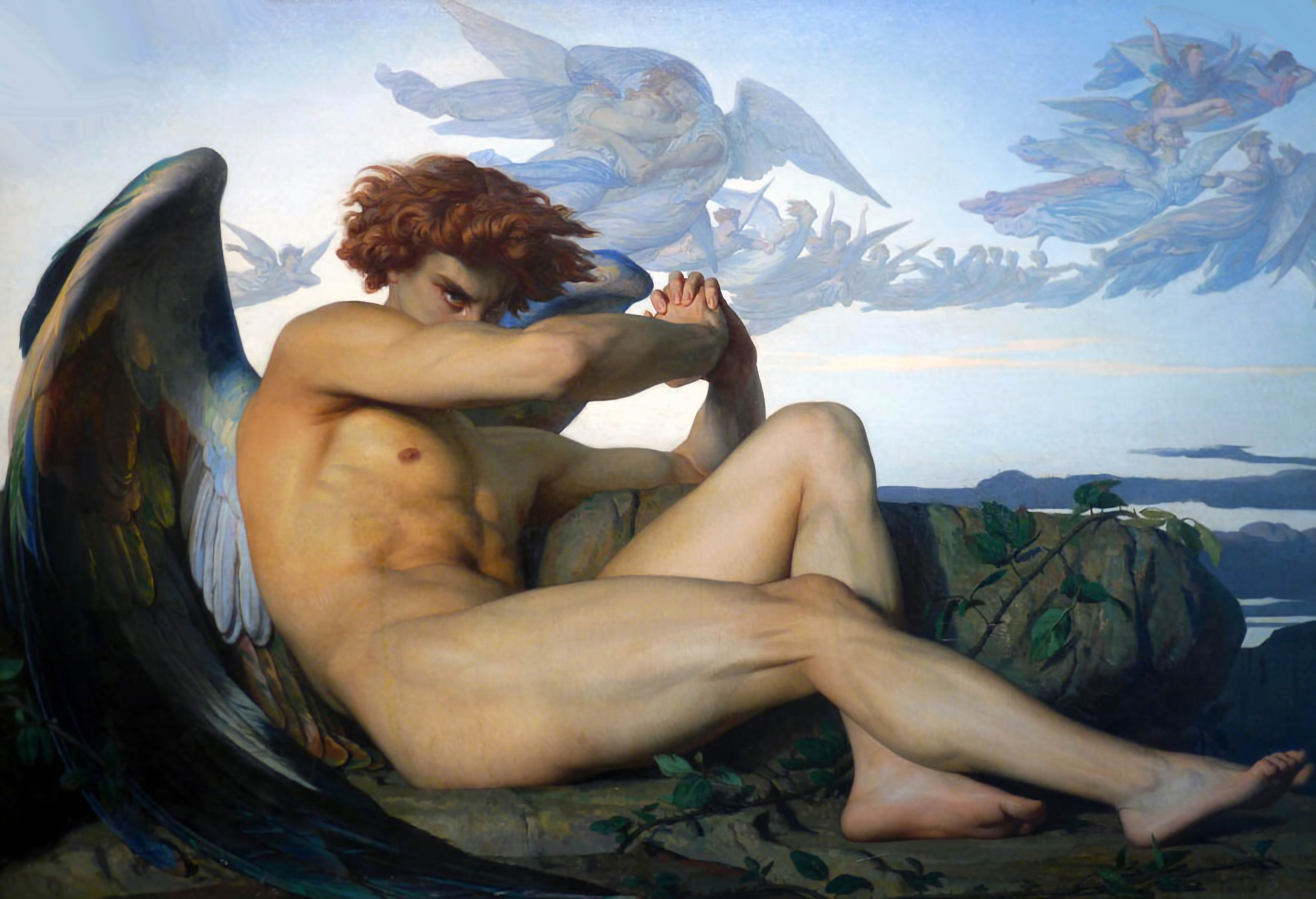
The Fallen Angel (1847)

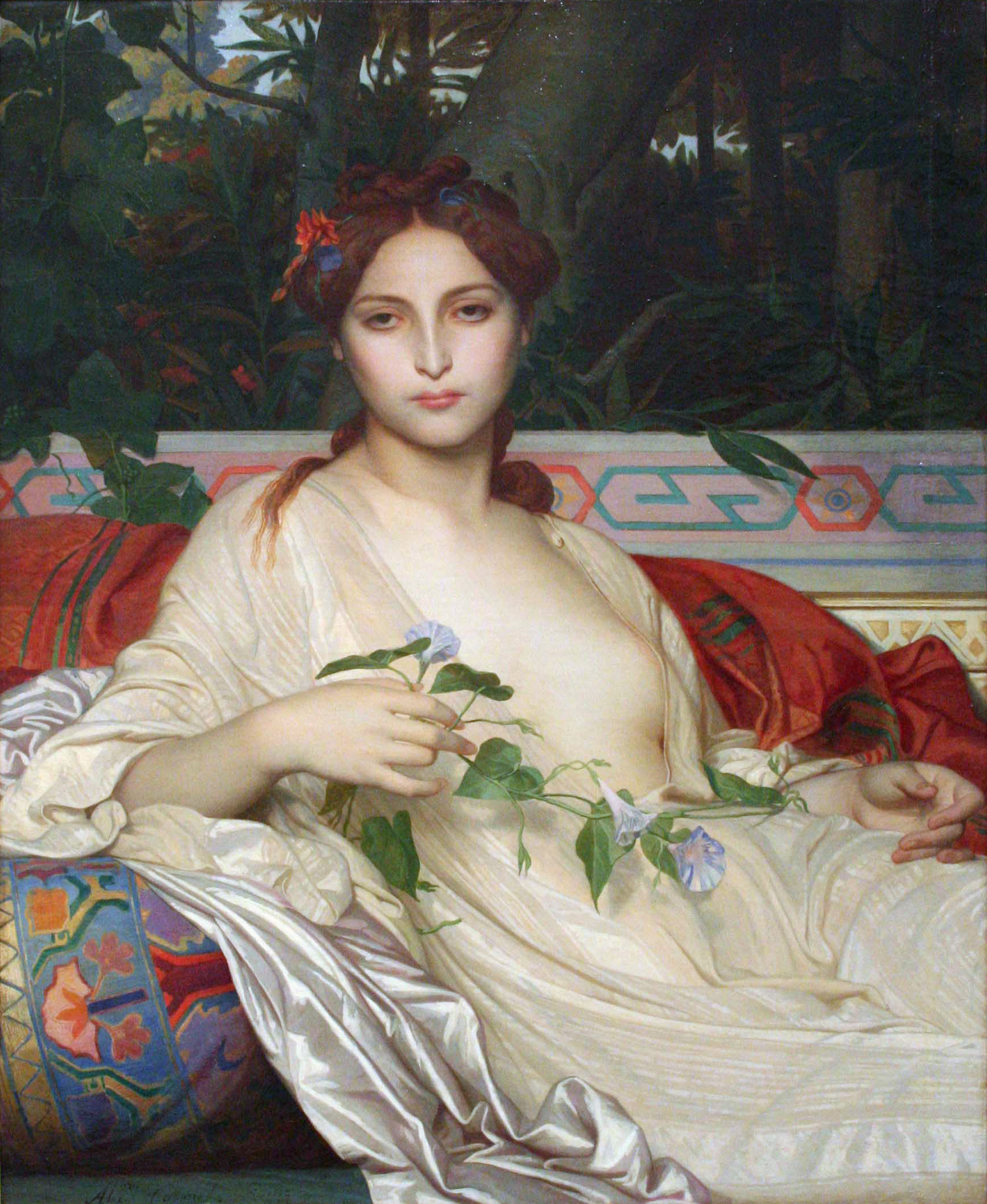
Albaydé (1848)

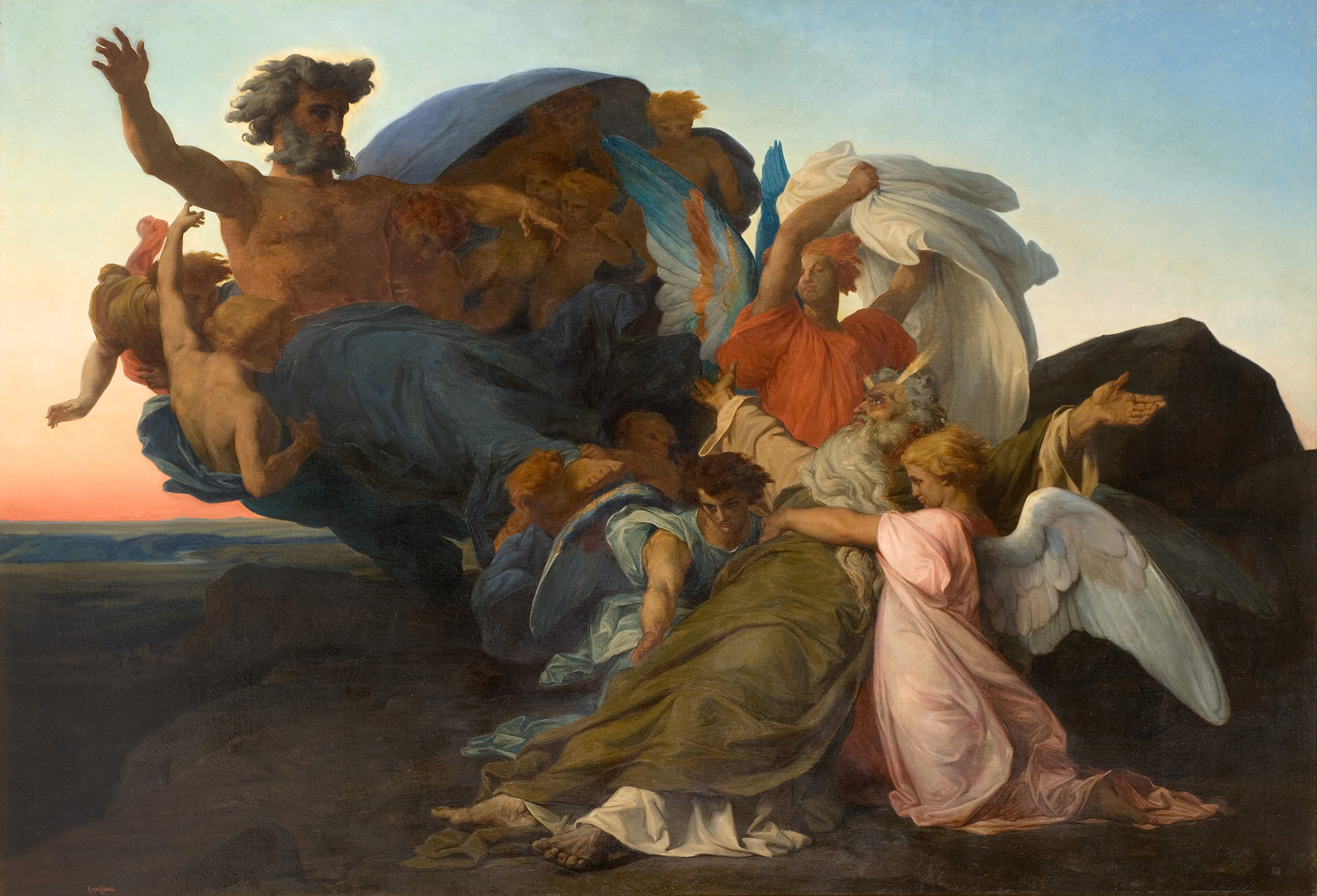
The Death of Moses (1850)

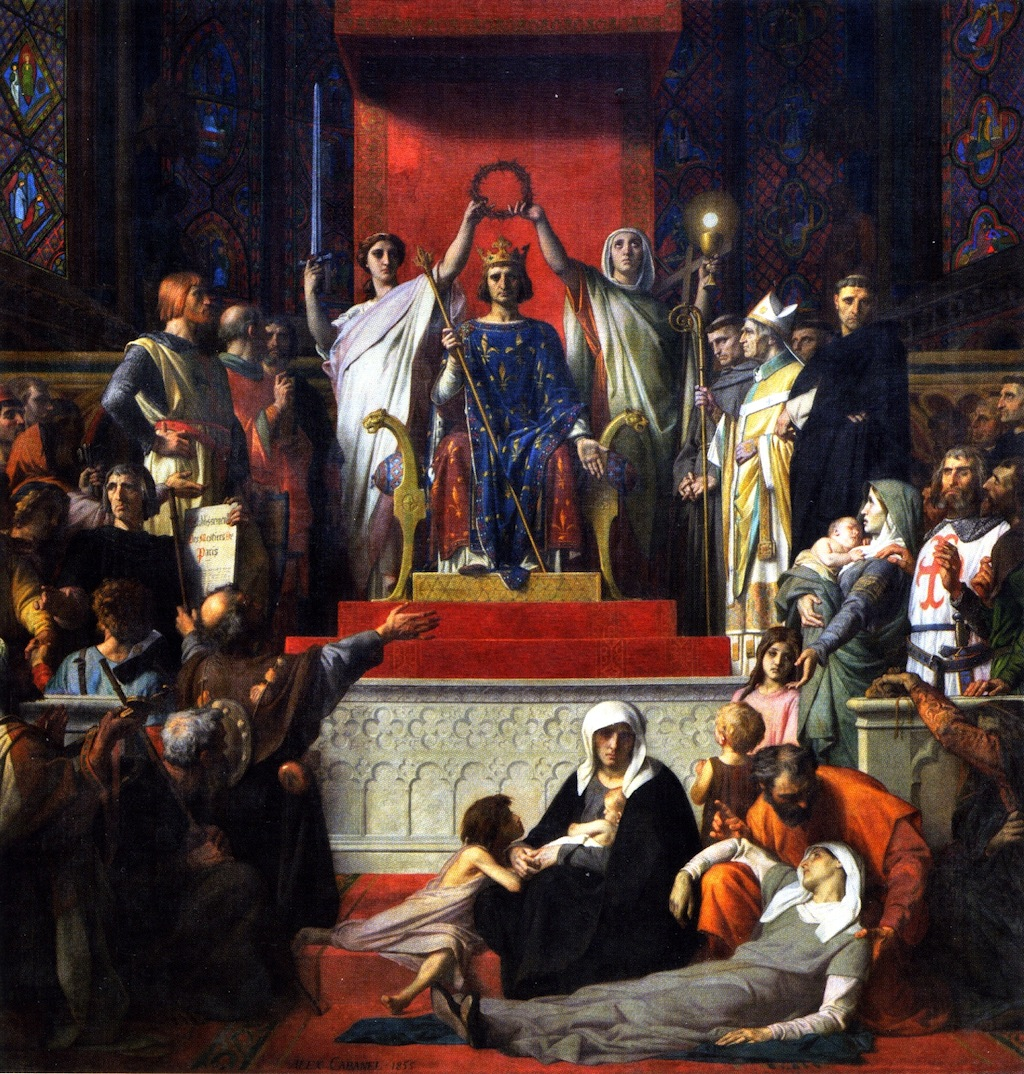
The Glorification of Saint Louis (1853)

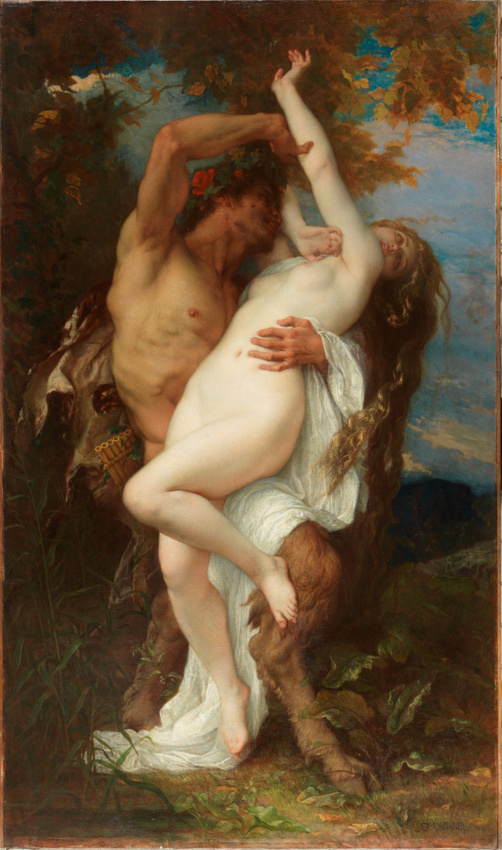
Nymph and Satyr (1860)

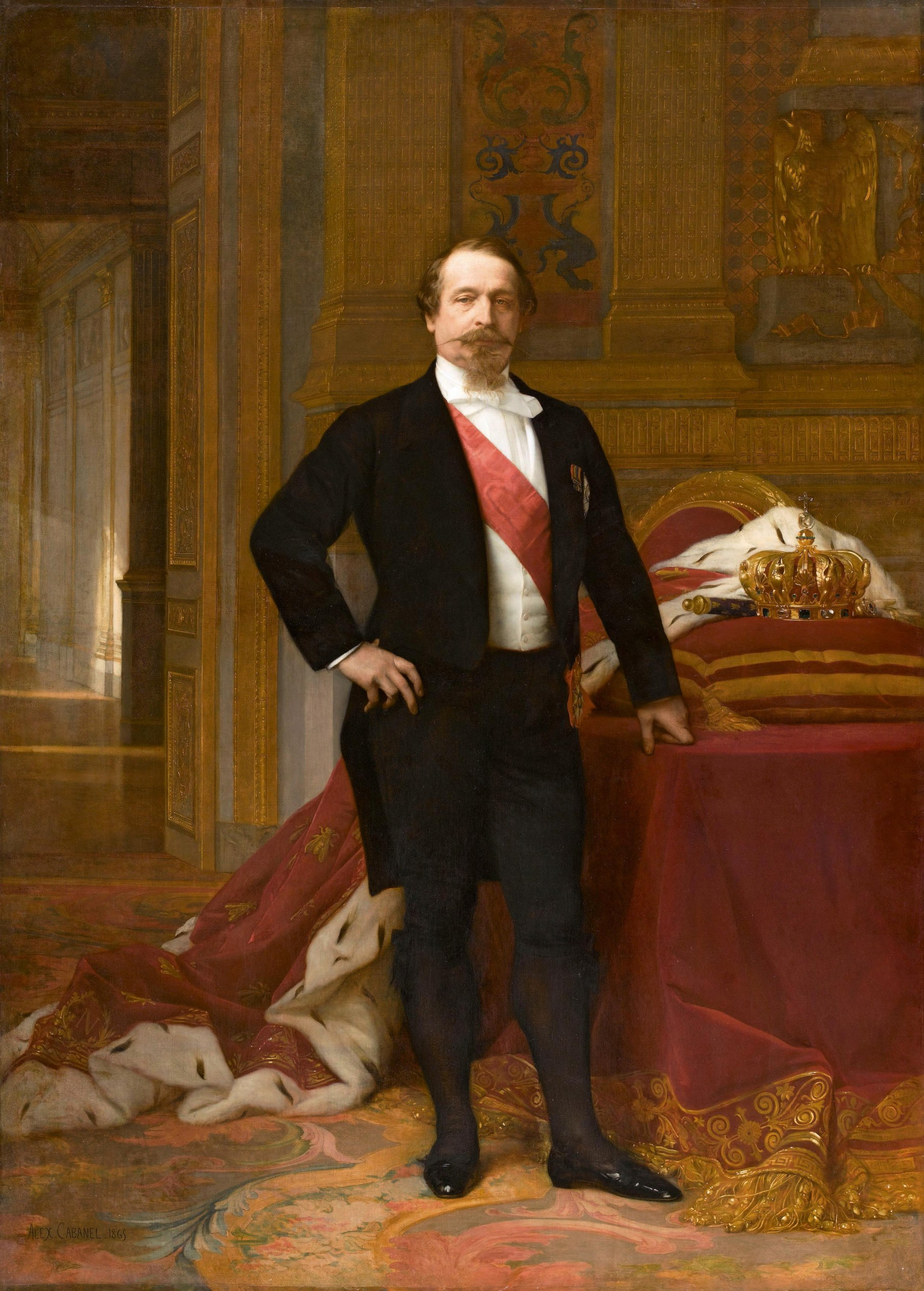
Portrait of Napoleon III (c. 1865)

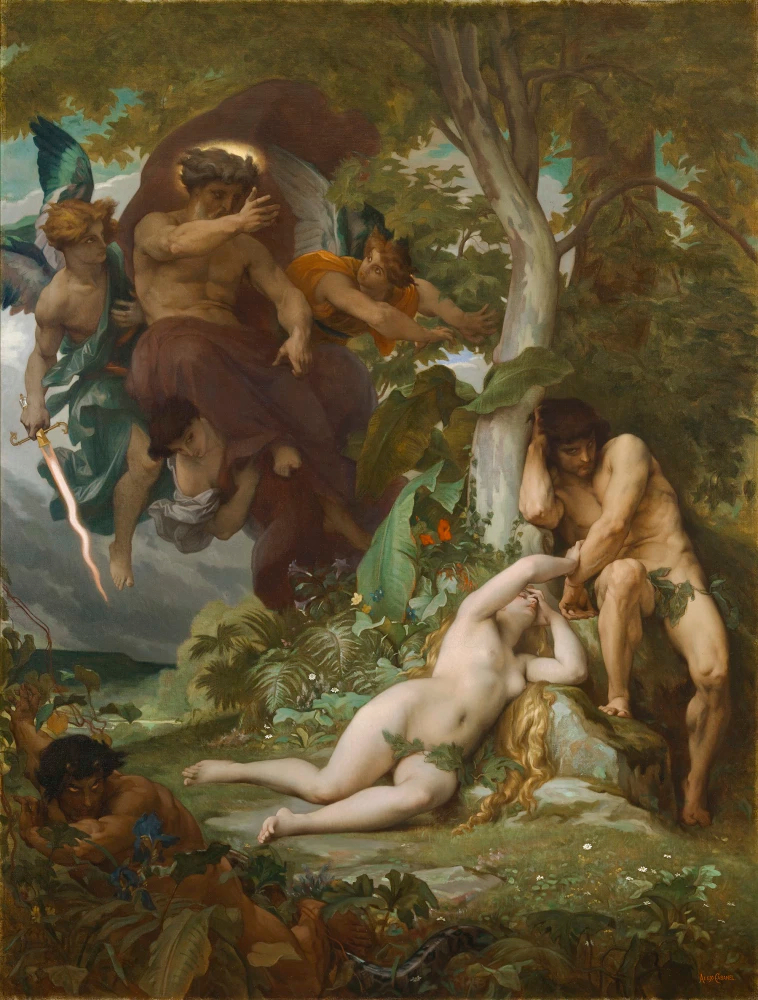
The Expulsion of Adam and Eve from the Garden of Paradise (1867)

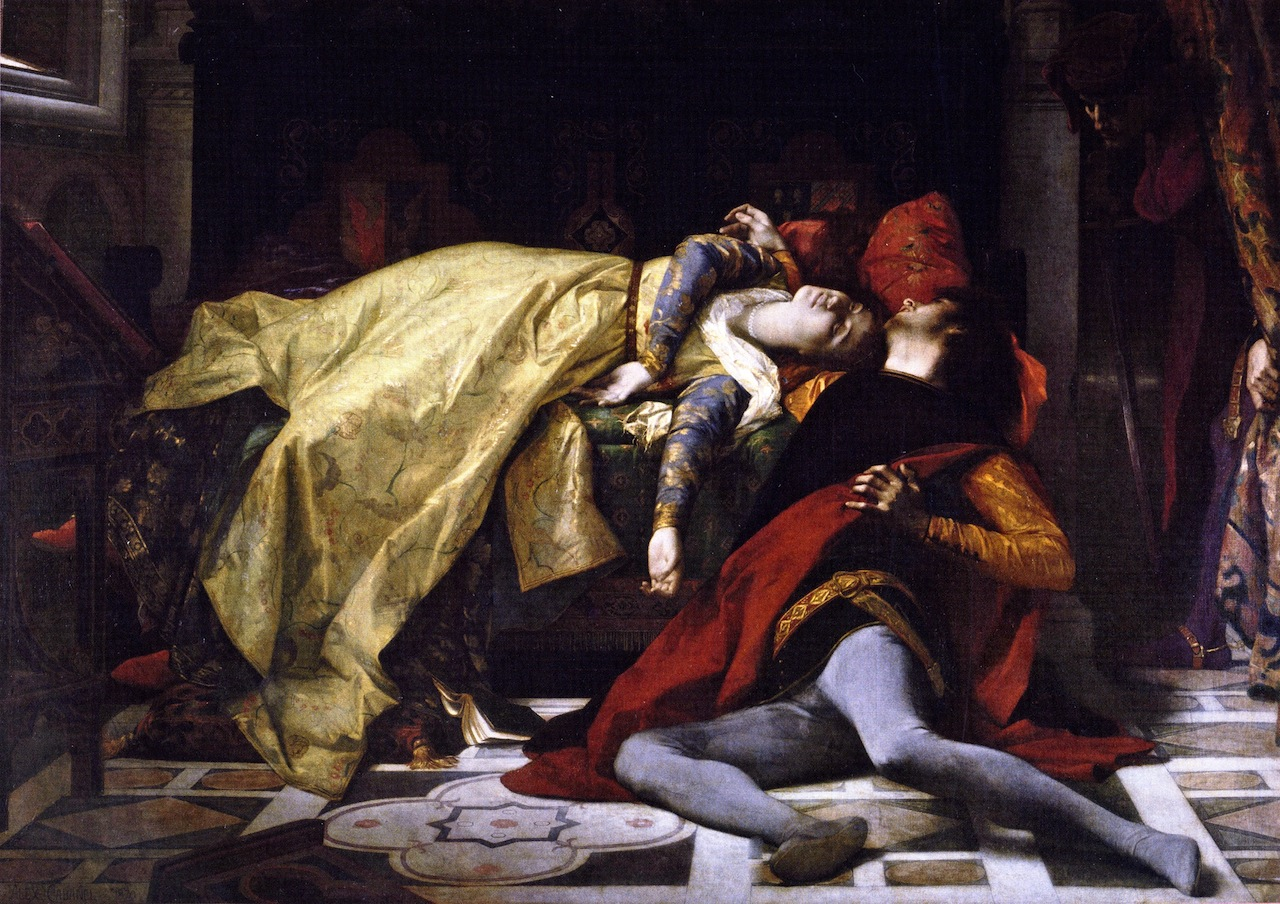
The Death of Francesca of Rimini and Paolo Malatesta (1870)

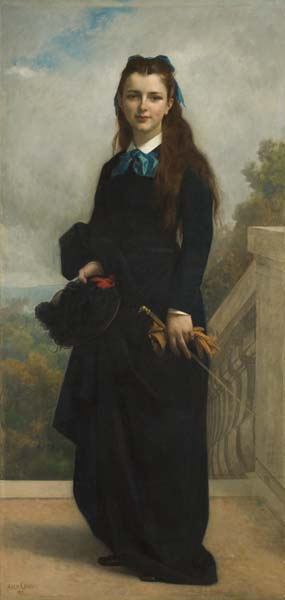
Portrait of Cornelia Lyman Warren (1871)

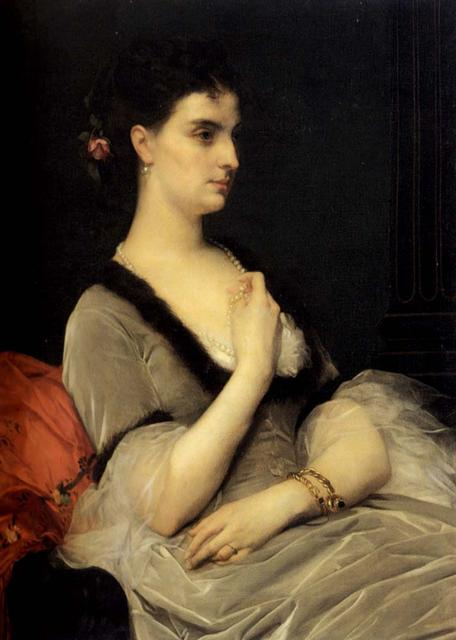
Portrait of Countess Elizabeth Vorontsova-Dashkova (1873)

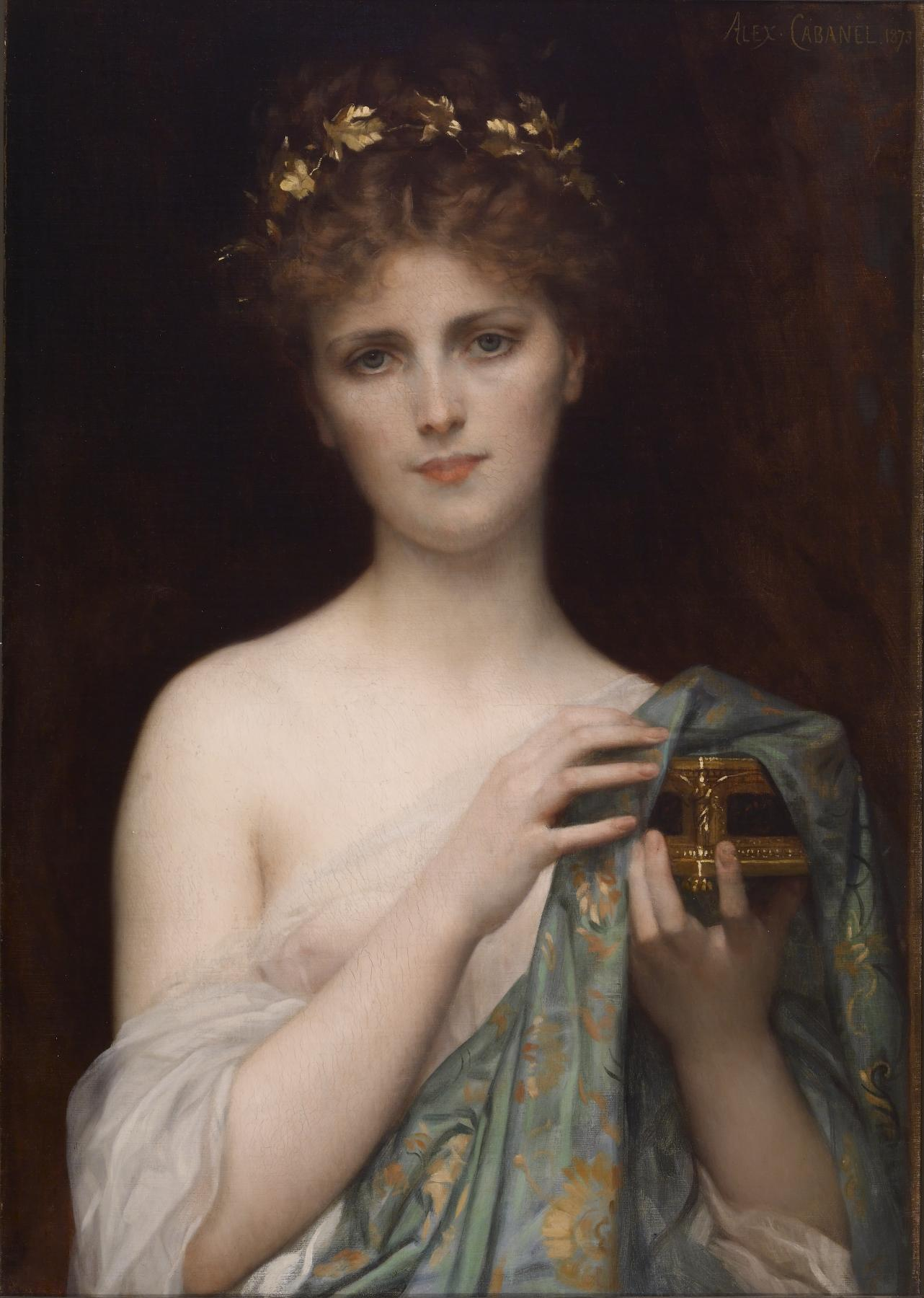
Pandora (1873), The Walters Art Museum

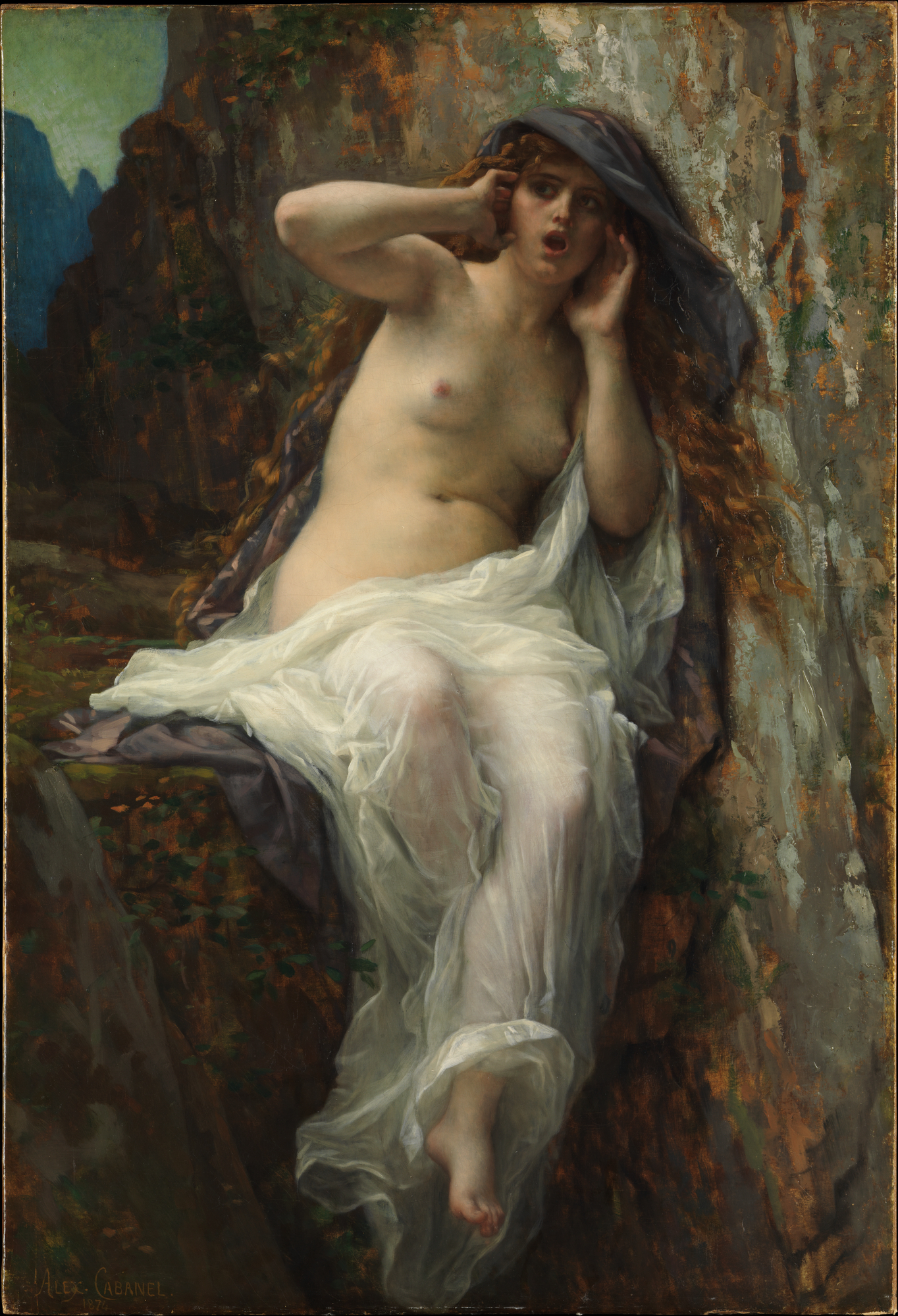
Echo (1874)

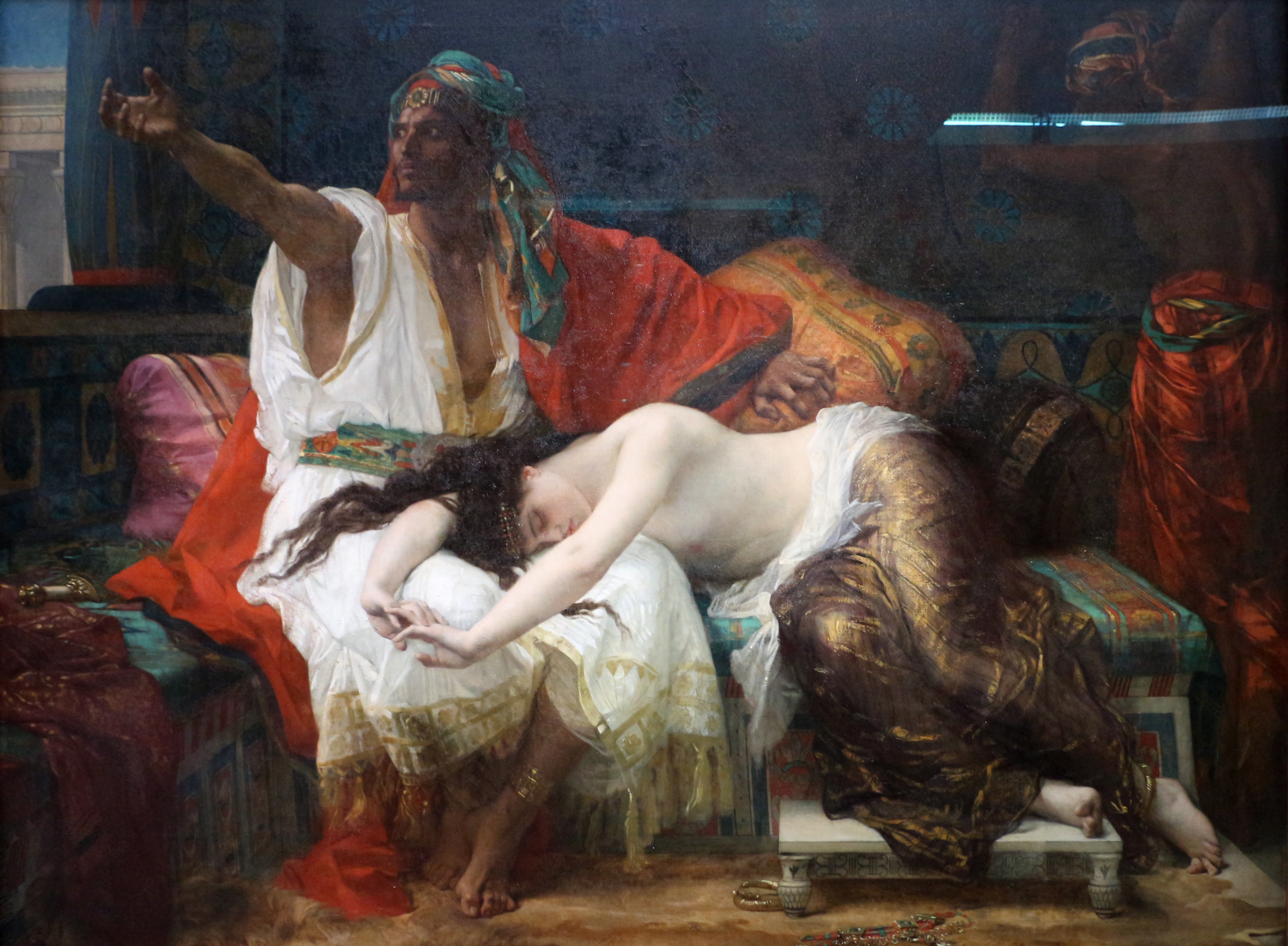
Thamar (1875)

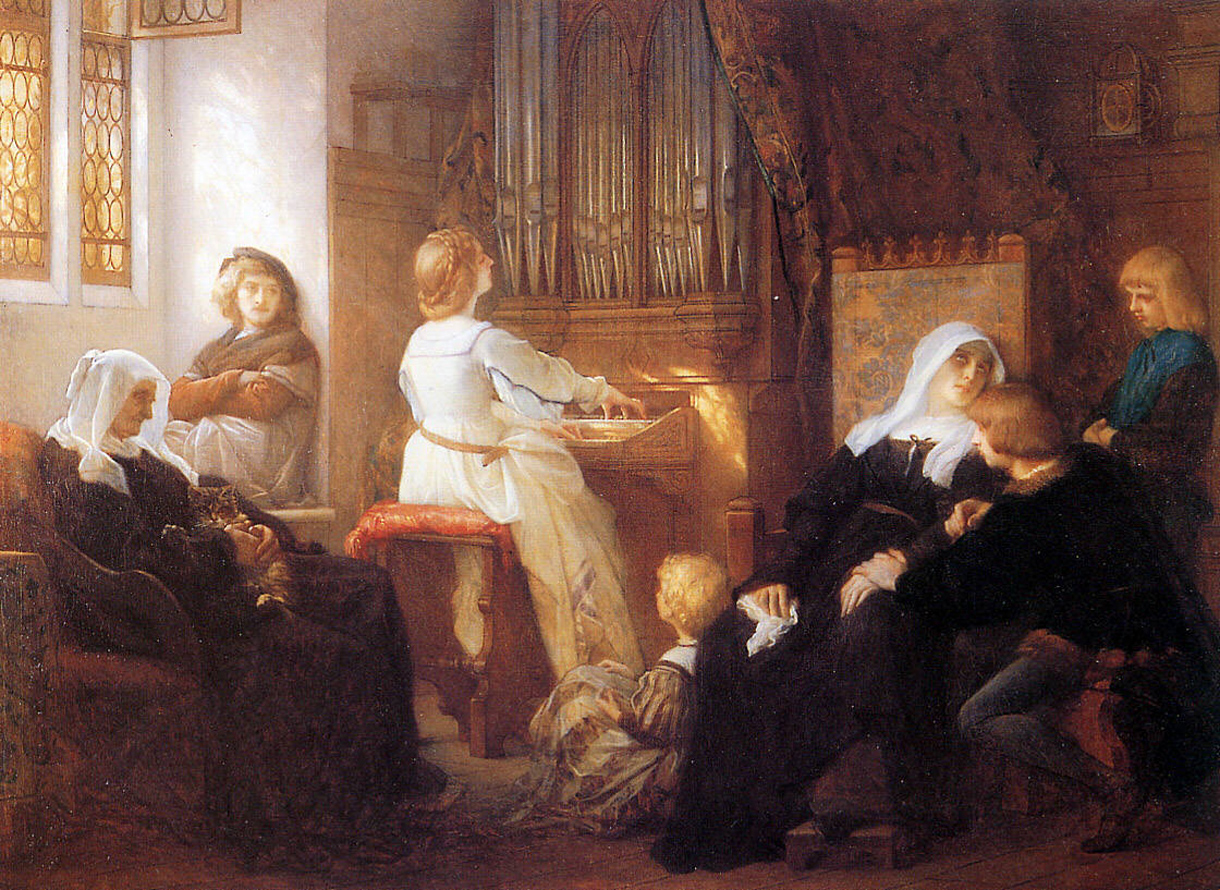
Harmonie (1877)

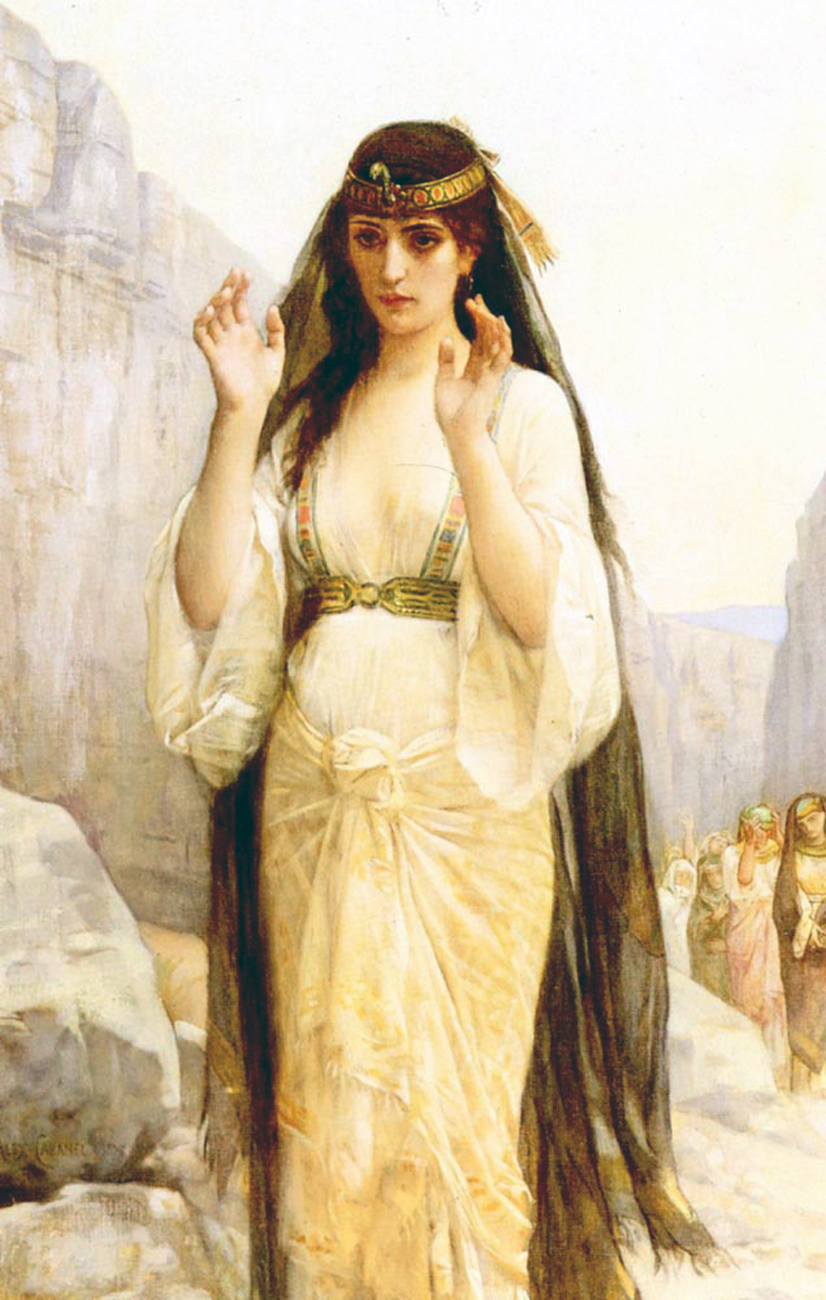
The daughter of Jephthah (1879)

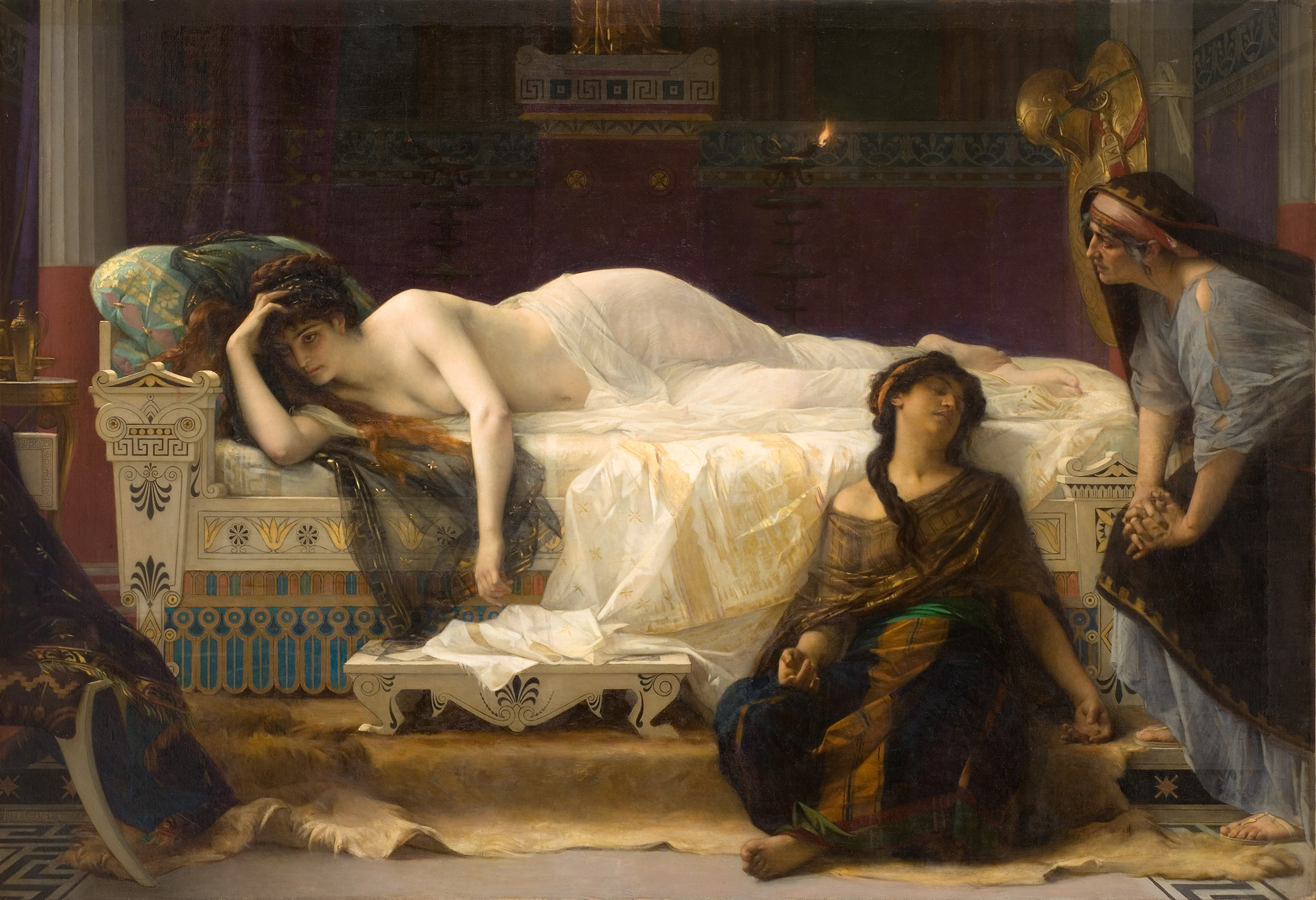
Phaedra (1880)

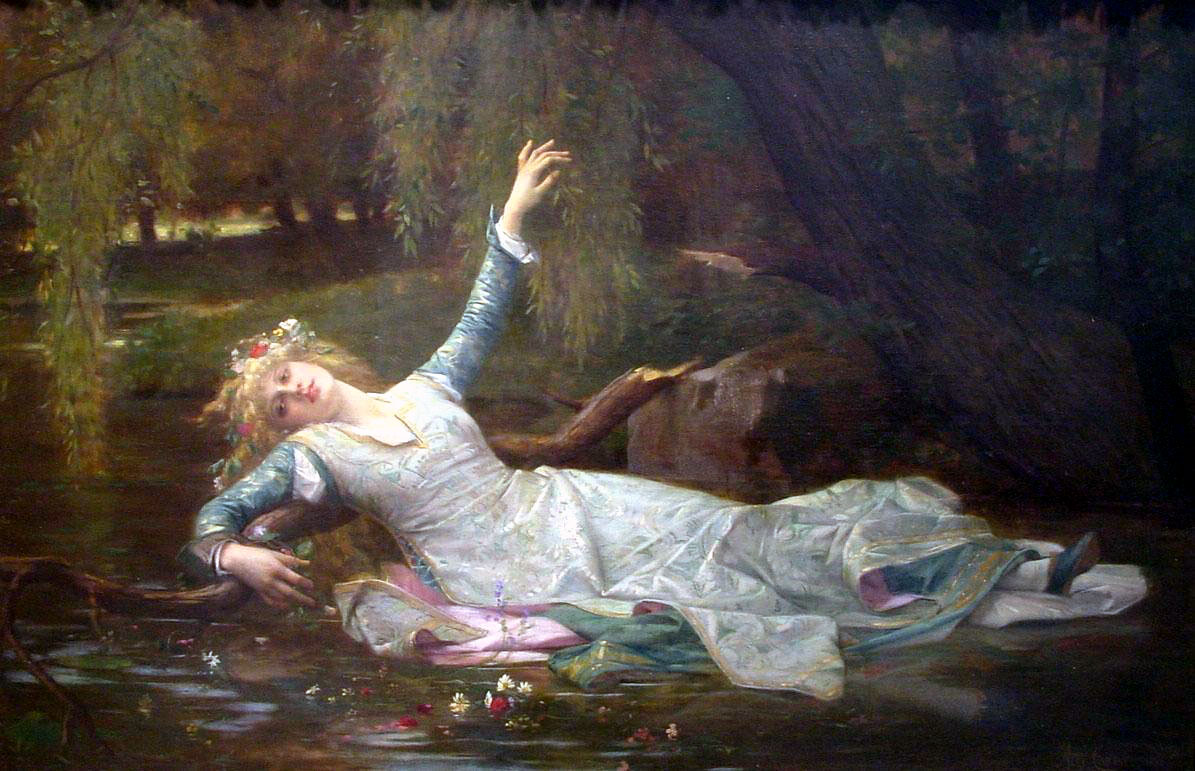
Ophelia (1883)

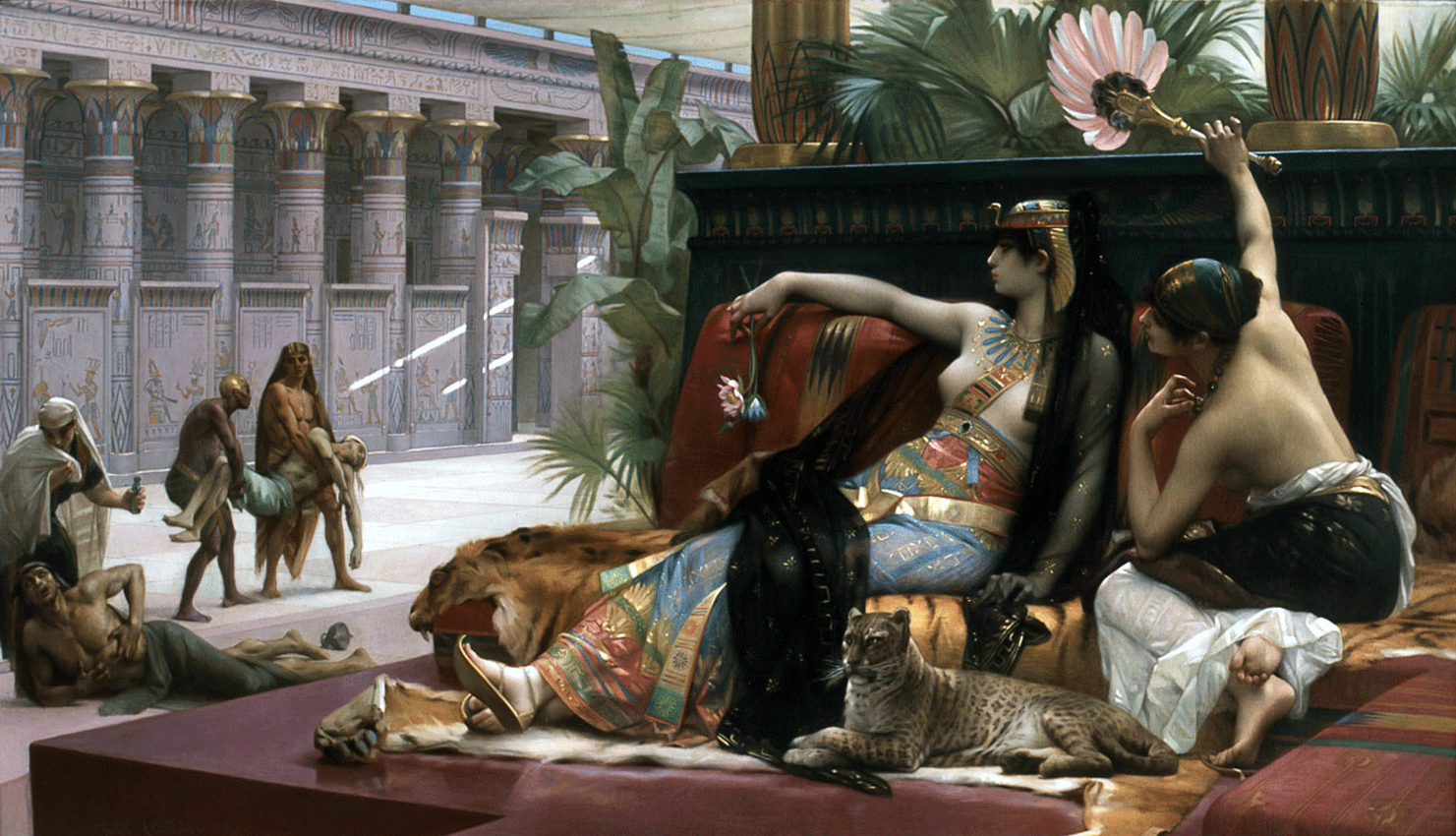
Cleopatra Testing Poisons on Condemned Prisoners (1887)

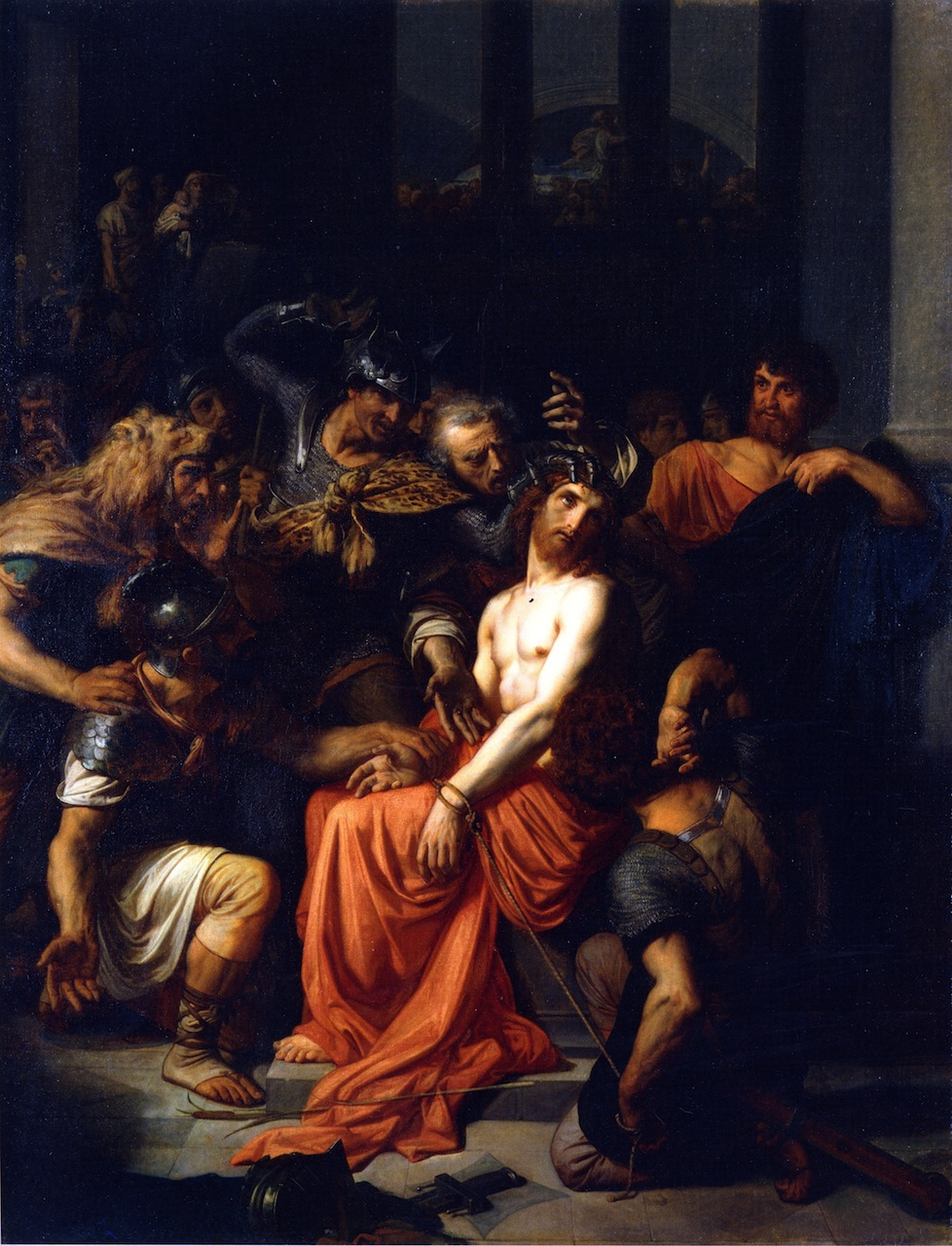
The Mocking of Christ (1845)

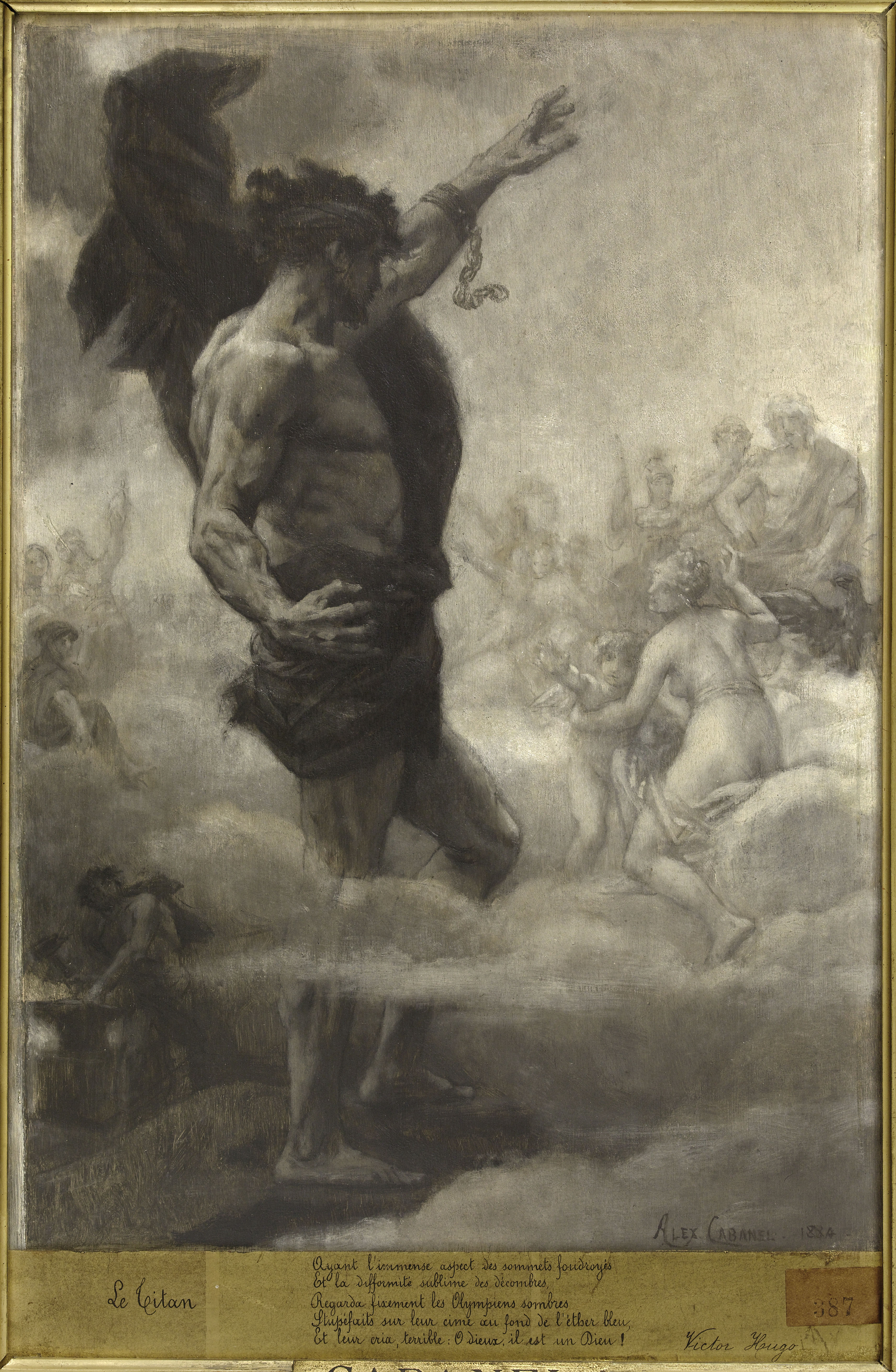
Le Titan (1884)
