= Pierre Capdeville =

French entomologist (1908–1980)

Pierre Capdeville (1908 – 2 March 1980) was a French entomologist. He specialised in Lepidoptera of the Parnassiinae subfamily.

== His life ==
A short necrology has been published by Jacques Rigout.

He was a technician of value, an alumnus of the École polytechnique.

== Works ==
After a first note published in the journal Alexanor, Pierre Capdeville wished to publish a more detailed study on the Parnassius apollo. Jean Bourgogne, then director of the publication, found the work too voluminous. He contacted then the company Sciences Nat which looked for authors. This work was published in 6 parts bilingual French-German. As author, Pierre Capdeville took care himself of all the part illustration, maps and photography of specimens of his collection.

He had in preparation two other works, one on the individual variations of Parnassius apollo, the other one on the genus Parnassius of the Palearctic realm.

Towards the end of his life it is the artist who overrode the technician. He realized watercolors of lepidoptera, with which a series of 4 were published.

His important collection was bequeathed to the National Museum of Natural History in Paris.

== Entomological terms named after him ==
- Imbrasia capdevillei Rougeot, 1979
- Parnassius epaphus capdevillei Epstein, 1979
- Peridinium capdevillei Balech, 1959
- Protoperidinium capdevillei Balech, 1959
