= The Birth of Venus (Cabanel) =

Painting by Alexandre Cabanel

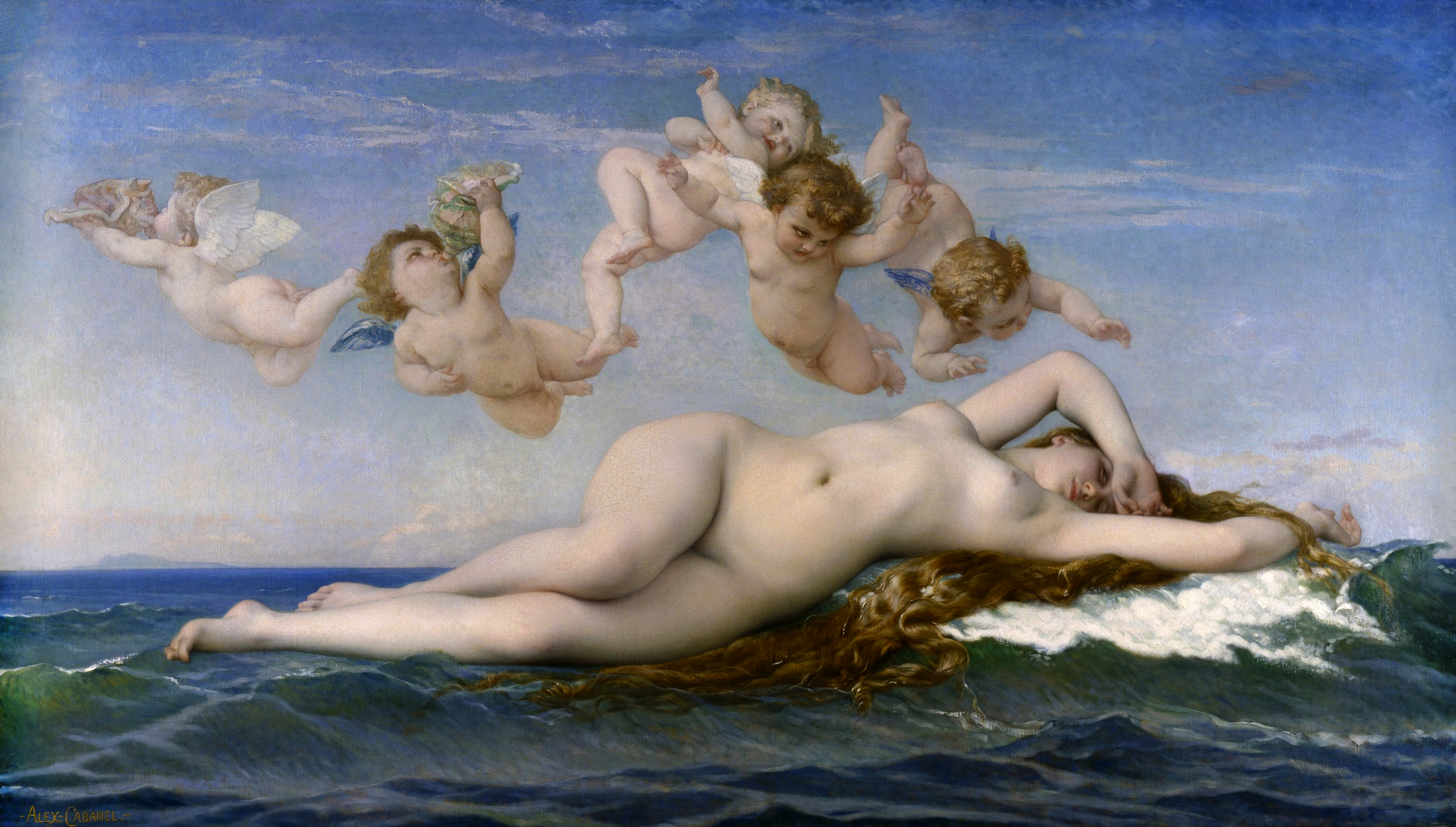
- Artist: Alexandre Cabanel
- Year: 1863
- Medium: Oil on canvas
- Dimensions: 150 cm × 250 cm (59 in × 98 in)
- Location: Musée d'Orsay, Paris

The Birth of Venus (French: La Naissance de Vénus) is a painting by the French artist Alexandre Cabanel. It was painted in 1863, and is now in the Musée d'Orsay in Paris. A second and smaller version (85 x 135.9 cm) from c. 1864 is in the Dahesh Museum of Art. A third (106 x 182.6 cm) version dates from 1875; it is in the Metropolitan Museum of Art in New York City.

Shown to great success at the Paris Salon of 1863, The Birth of Venus was immediately purchased by Napoleon III for his own personal collection. That same year Cabanel was made a professor of the École des Beaux-Arts.

Cabanel's sensual goddess exemplifies the graceful forms and classically-derived subject matter valued by the conservative French Salon, which was beginning to be challenged by artists focusing on scenes and ideas from modern life. Art historian and curator Robert Rosenblum wrote of Cabanel's The Birth of Venus that "This Venus hovers somewhere between an ancient deity and a modern dream"; he described "the ambiguity of her eyes, that seem to be closed but that a close look reveals that she is awake ... A nude who could be asleep or awake is specially formidable for a male viewer."

== Background ==
At the Salon of 1863, The Birth of Venus was one of a multitude of female nudes. Bathed in opalescent colors, the goddess Venus looks to the viewer from beneath the crook of her elbow. Two years later, Édouard Manet presented Olympia at the Salon as well. James Rubin writes of the two works: "The Olympia is often compared to Cabanel's Birth of Venus, for the latter is a far more sexually appealing work, despite its mythological guise… It is evident Manet's demythologizing of the female nude was foremost a timely reminder of modern realities."

Cabanel produced a seductive image of a mythological goddess in an academic style that was associated with traditional artistic standards of the French Salon.

Cabanel trained at the Ecole des Beaux Arts under the painter François-Edouard Picot. Following his tutelage, he entered his first Salon in 1843 and won second place in the Prix de Rome in 1845. Famed for his mythological paintings, Cabanel also made a name for himself in Europe and abroad through his portraits.

Cabanel was a favored portraitist of the Emperor Napoleon, and he refused to travel outside France to accept a commission. C.H Stranahan summarized the appeal of Cabanel's style shortly before his death saying: "…He is especially the master of every grace attractive to woman; great judiciousness in rendering what his subtle reading of the human face gives him; great power and knowledge of hands, which leads to his throwing a veil of mystery over the expression, even leaving a softening vagueness".

== See also ==
- The Birth of Venus. Other paintings on the same subject.
- The Pearl and the Wave
