= Women in the Bible =

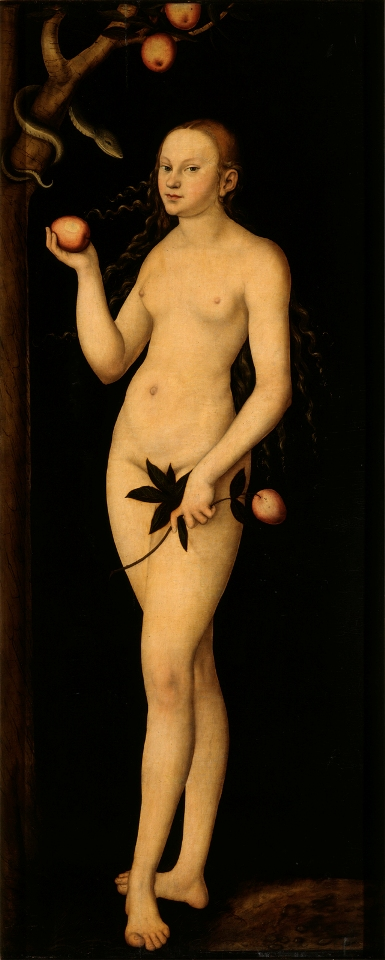
Eva by Lucas Cranach the Elder (1531)

Women in the Bible include wives, mothers and daughters, servants, slaves and prostitutes. As both victors and victims, some women in the Bible change the course of important events while others are powerless to affect even their own destinies. The majority of women in the Bible are anonymous and unnamed. Individual portraits of various women in the Bible show women in various roles. The New Testament refers to a number of women in Jesus' inner circle, and scholars generally see him as dealing with women with respect and equality.

Ancient Near Eastern societies have traditionally been described as patriarchal, and the Bible, as a document written by men, has traditionally been interpreted as patriarchal in its overall views of women. Marital and inheritance laws in the Bible favor men, and women in the Bible exist under much stricter laws of sexual behavior than men. In ancient biblical times, women were subject to strict laws of purity, both ritual and moral.

Recent scholarship accepts the presence of patriarchy in the Bible, but shows that heterarchy is also present: heterarchy acknowledges that different power structures between people can exist at the same time, that each power structure has its own hierarchical arrangements, and that women had some spheres of power of their own separate from men. There is evidence of gender balance in the Bible, and there is no attempt in the Bible to portray women as deserving of less because of their "naturally evil" natures.

While women are not generally in the forefront of public life in the Bible, those women who are named are usually prominent for reasons outside the ordinary. For example, they are often involved in the overturning of human power structures in a common biblical literary device called "reversal". Abigail, David's wife, Esther the Queen, and Jael who drove a tent peg into the enemy commander's temple while he slept, are a few examples of women who turned the tables on men with power. The founding matriarchs are mentioned by name, as are some prophetesses, judges, heroines, and queens, while the common woman is largely, though not completely, unseen. The slave Hagar's story is told, and the prostitute Rahab's story is also told, among a few others.

The New Testament names women in positions of leadership in the early church as well. Views of women in the Bible have changed throughout history and those changes are reflected in art and culture. There are controversies within the contemporary Christian church concerning women and their role in the church.

== Women, sex, and law in surrounding cultures ==
Almost all Near Eastern societies of the Bronze Age (3000–1200 BCE) and Axial Age (800 to 300 BCE) were established as patriarchal societies by 3000 BCE. Eastern societies such as the Akkadians, Hittites, Assyrians and Persians relegated women to an inferior and subordinate position. There are very few exceptions, but one can be found in the third millennium BC with the Sumerians who accorded women a position which was almost equal to that of men. However, by the second millennium, the rights and status of women were reduced.

In the West, the status of Egyptian women was high, and their legal rights approached equality with men throughout the last three millennia BCE. A few women even ruled as pharaohs. However, historian Sarah Pomeroy explains that even in those ancient patriarchal societies where a woman could occasionally become queen, her position did not empower her female subjects.

Classics scholar Bonnie MacLachlan writes that Greece and Rome were patriarchal cultures.

The roles women were expected to fill in all these ancient societies were predominantly domestic with a few exceptions such as Sparta, who fed women equally with men, and trained them to fight in the belief women would thereby produce stronger children. The predominant views of Ancient and Classical Greece were patriarchal; however, there is also a misogynistic strain present in Greek literature from its beginnings. A polarized view of women allowed some classics authors, such as Thales, Socrates, Plato, Aristotle, Aristophanes and Philo, and others, to write about women as "twice as bad as men", a "pernicious race", "never to be trusted on any account", and as an inherently inferior race of beings separate from the race of men.

Rome was heavily influenced by Greek thought. Sarah Pomeroy says "never did Roman society encourage women to engage in the same activities as men of the same social class." In The World of Odysseus, classical scholar Moses Finley says: "There is no mistaking the fact that Homer fully reveals what remained true for the whole of antiquity: that women were held to be naturally inferior..."

Pomeroy also states that women played a vital role in classical Greek and Roman religion, sometimes attaining a freedom in religious activities denied to them elsewhere. Wayne Meeks writes that there is no evidence this went beyond the internal practices of the religion itself. The mysteries created no alternative in larger society to the established patterns, but there is some evidence of a disruption of traditional women's roles within some of the mystery cults. Priestesses in charge of official cults such as that of Athena Polias in ancient Athens were paid well, were looked upon as role models, and wielded considerable social and political power. In the important Eleusinian Mysteries in ancient Greece, men, women, children and slaves were admitted and initiated into its secrets on a basis of complete equality. In Rome, priestesses of state cults, such as the Vestal Virgins, were able to achieve positions of status and power. They were able to live independently from men, made ceremonial appearances at public events and could accrue considerable wealth. Both ancient Greece and Rome celebrated important women-only religious festivals during which women were able to socialize and build bonds with each other. Although the "ideal woman" in the writings and sayings of male philosophers and leaders was one who would stay out of the public view and attend to the running of her household and the upbringing of her children, in practice some women in both ancient Greece and Rome were able to attain considerable influence outside the purely domestic sphere.

Laws in patriarchal societies regulated three sorts of sexual infractions involving women: rape, fornication (which includes adultery and prostitution), and incest. There is a homogeneity to these codes across time, and across borders, which implies the aspects of life that these laws enforced were established practices within the norms and values of the populations. The prominent use of corporal punishment, capital punishment, corporal mutilation, 'eye-for-an-eye' talion punishments, and vicarious punishments (children for their fathers) were standard across Mesopotamian Law. Ur-Nammu, who founded the Sumerian Third Dynasty of Ur in southern Mesopotamia, sponsored the oldest surviving codes of law dating from approximately 2200 BCE. Most other codes of law date from the second millennium BCE including the famous Babylonian Laws of Hammurabi which dates to about 1750 BCE. Ancient laws favored men, protecting the procreative rights of men as a common value in all the laws pertaining to women and sex.

In all these codes, rape is punished differently depending upon whether it occurs in the city where a woman's calls for help could be heard or the country where they could not be (as in Deuteronomy 22:23–27). The Hittite laws also condemn a woman raped in her house presuming the man could not have entered without her permission. Fornication is a broad term for a variety of inappropriate sexual behaviors including adultery and prostitution. In the code of Hammurabi, and in the Assyrian code, both the adulterous woman and her lover are to be bound and drowned, but forgiveness could supply a reprieve. In the Biblical law, (Leviticus 20:10; Deuteronomy 22:22) forgiveness is not an option: the lovers must die (Deuteronomy 22:21,24). No mention is made of an adulterous man in any code. In Hammurabi, a woman can apply for a divorce but must prove her moral worthiness or be drowned for asking. It is enough in all codes for two unmarried individuals engaged in a sexual relationship to marry. However, if a husband later accuses his wife of not having been a virgin when they married, she will be stoned to death.

Until the codes introduced in the Hebrew Bible, most codes of law allowed prostitution. Classics scholars Allison Glazebrook and Madeleine M. Henry say attitudes concerning prostitution "cut to the core of societal attitude towards gender and to social constructions of sexuality." Many women in a variety of ancient cultures were forced into prostitution. Many were children and adolescents. According to the 5th century BCE historian Herodotus, the sacred prostitution of the Babylonians was "a shameful custom" requiring every woman in the country to go to the precinct of Venus, and consort with a stranger. Some waited years for release while being used without say or pay. The initiation rituals of devdasi of pre-pubescent girls included a deflowering ceremony which gave Priests the right to have intercourse with every girl in the temple. In Greece, slaves were required to work as prostitutes and had no right to decline. The Hebrew Bible code is the only one of these codes that condemns prostitution.

In the code of Hammurabi, as in Leviticus, incest is condemned and punishable by death, however, punishment is dependent upon whether the honor of another man has been compromised. Genesis glosses over incest repeatedly, and in 2 Samuel and the time of King David, Tamar is still able to offer marriage to her half brother as an alternative to rape. Exodus, Leviticus, and Numbers condemn all sexual relations between relatives.

== Hebrew Bible (Old Testament) ==
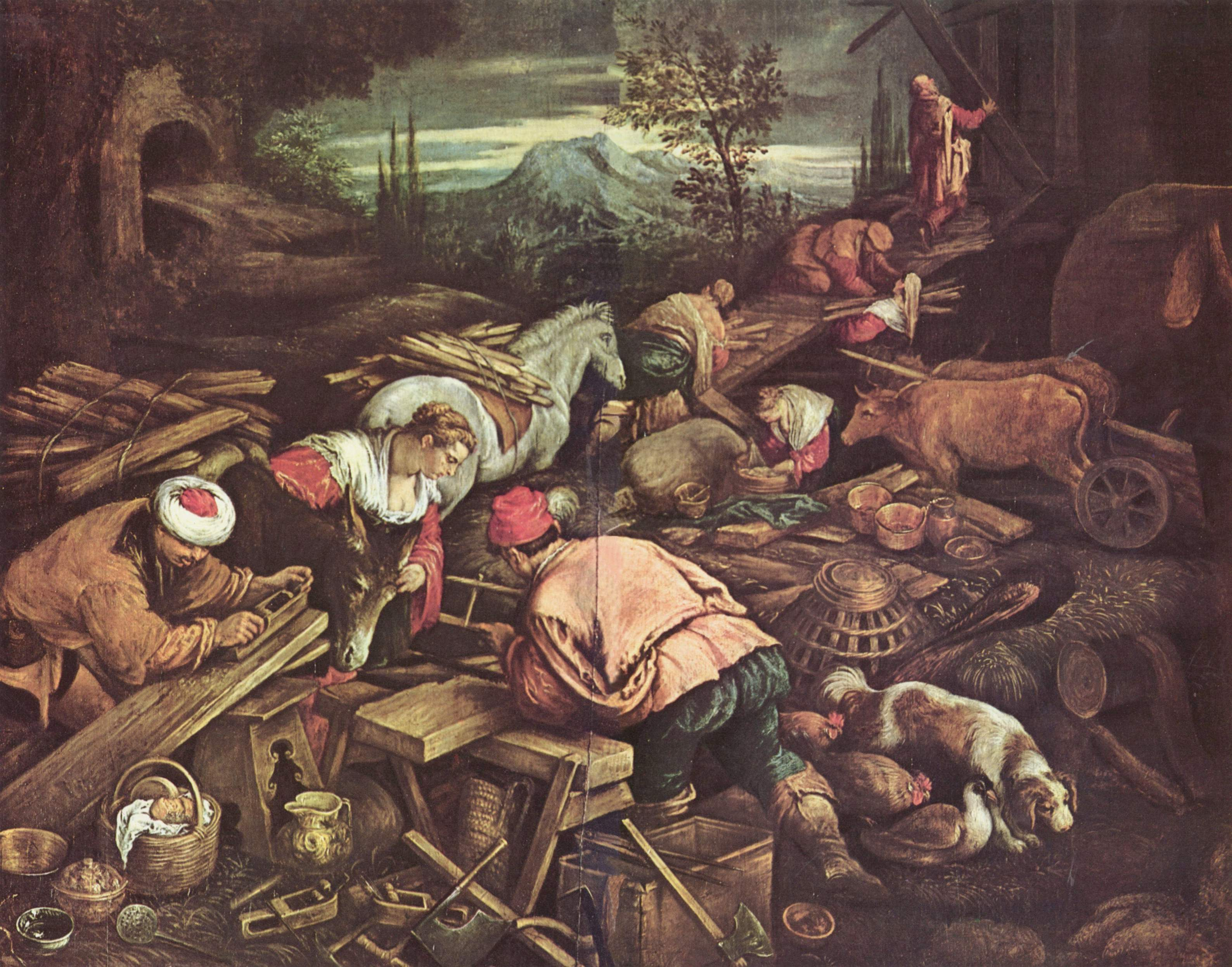
The Construction of Noah's Ark depicts the eight people said to be on the ark, including the four wives, who are all unnamed in the Book of Genesis. Jacopo Bassano, 16th century

According to traditional Jewish enumeration, the Hebrew canon is composed of 24 books written by various authors, using primarily Hebrew and some Aramaic, which came into being over a span of almost a millennium. The Hebrew Bible's earliest texts reflect a Late Bronze Age Near Eastern civilization, while its last text, thought by most scholars to be the Book of Daniel, comes from a second century BCE Hellenistic world.

Compared to the number of men, few women are mentioned in the Bible by name. The exact number of named and unnamed women in the Bible is somewhat uncertain because of a number of difficulties involved in calculating the total. For example, the Bible sometimes uses different names for the same woman, names in different languages can be translated differently, and some names can be used for either men or women. Professor Karla Bombach says one study produced a total of 3000–3100 names, 2900 of which are men with 170 of the total being women. However, the possibility of duplication produced the recalculation of a total of 1700 distinct personal names in the Bible with 137 of them being women. In yet another study of the Hebrew Bible only, there were a total of 1426 names with 1315 belonging to men and 111 to women. Seventy percent of the named and unnamed women in the Bible come from the Hebrew Bible. "Despite the disparities among these different calculations, ... [it remains true that] women or women's names represent between 5.5 and 8 percent of the total [names in the Bible], a stunning reflection of the androcentric character of the Bible." A study of women whose spoken words are recorded found 93, of which 49 women are named.

The common, ordinary, everyday Hebrew woman is "largely unseen" in the pages of the Bible, and the women that are seen, are the unusual who rose to prominence. These prominent women include the Matriarchs Sarah, Rebecca, Rachel and Leah, Miriam the prophetess, Deborah the Judge, Huldah the prophetess, Abigail (who married David), Rahab, and Esther. A common phenomenon in the Bible is the pivotal role that women take in subverting man-made power structures. The result is often a more just outcome than what would have taken place under ordinary circumstances. Law professor Geoffrey Miller explains that these women did not receive opposition for the roles they played, but were honored instead.

=== Views on gender ===
There has been substantial agreement for over one hundred years, among a wide variety of scholars, that the Hebrew Bible is a predominantly patriarchal document from a patriarchal age. New Testament scholar Ben Witherington III says it "limited women's roles and functions to the home, and severely restricted: (1) their rights of inheritance, (2) their choice of relationship, (3) their ability to pursue a religious education or fully participate in a synagogue, and (4) limited their freedom of movement." Recent scholarship is calling some aspects of this into question.

the validity and appropriateness of [patriarchy] to designate both families and society have recently been challenged in several disciplines: ... Taken together, these challenges provide compelling reasons for abandoning the patriarchy model as an adequate or accurate descriptor of ancient Israel.

Carol Meyers, feminist biblical scholar, argues for heterarchy over patriarchy as the appropriate term to describe ancient Israelite attitudes toward gender. Heterarchy acknowledges that different "power structures can exist simultaneously in any given society, with each structure having its own hierarchical arrangements that may cross-cut each other laterally". Meyers says male dominance was real but fragmentary, with women also having spheres of influence of their own. Women were responsible for "maintenance activities" including economic, social, political and religious life in both the household and the community. The Old Testament lists twenty different professional-type positions that women held in ancient Israel. Meyers references Tikva Frymer-Kensky as saying that Deuteronomic laws were fair to women except in matters of sexuality.

Frymer-Kensky says there is evidence of "gender blindness" in the Hebrew Bible. Unlike other ancient literature, the Hebrew Bible does not explain or justify cultural subordination by portraying women as deserving of less because of their "naturally evil" natures. The Biblical depiction of early Bronze Age culture up through the Axial Age, depicts the "essence" of women, (that is the Bible's metaphysical view of being and nature), of both male and female as "created in the image of God" with neither one inherently inferior in nature. Discussions of the nature of women are conspicuously absent from the Hebrew Bible. Biblical narratives do not show women as having different goals, desires, or strategies or as using methods that vary from those used by men not in authority. Judaic studies scholar David R. Blumenthal explains these strategies made use of "informal power" which was different from that of men with authority. There are no personality traits described as being unique to women in the Hebrew Bible. Most theologians agree the Hebrew Bible does not depict the slave, the poor, or women, as different metaphysically in the manner other societies of the same eras did.

Theologians Evelyn Stagg and Frank Stagg say the Ten Commandments of Exodus 20 contain aspects of both male priority and gender balance. In the tenth commandment against coveting, a wife is depicted in the examples of things, possessions, belonging to a man that are not to be coveted: house, wife, male or female slave, ox or donkey, or 'anything that belongs to your neighbour.' On the other hand, the fifth commandment to honor parents does not make any distinction in the honor to be shown between one parent and another.

The Hebrew Bible often portrays women as victors, leaders, and heroines with qualities Israel should emulate. Women such as Hagar, Tamar, Miriam, Rahab, Deborah, Esther, and Yael/Jael, are among many female "saviors" of Israel. Tykva Frymer-Kensky says "victor stories follow the paradigm of Israel's central sacred story: the lowly are raised, the marginal come to the center, the poor boy makes good." She goes on to say these women conquered the enemy "by their wits and daring, were symbolic representations of their people, and pointed to the salvation of Israel."

The Hebrew Bible portrays women as victims as well as victors. For example, in Numbers 31, the Israelites slay the people of Midian, except for 32,000 virgin women who are kept as spoils of war. Phyllis Trible, in Texts of Terror, tells four Bible stories of suffering in ancient Israel where women are the victims. Tribble describes the Bible as "a mirror" that reflects humans, and human life, in all its "holiness and horror". Frymer-Kensky says the Bible's authors use vulnerable women symbolically as "images of the Israel that is [also] small and vulnerable..." For Frymer-Kensky, "this is not misogynist story-telling but something far more complex in which the treatment of women becomes the clue to the morality of the social order." Professor of Religion J. David Pleins says these tales are included by the Deuteronomic historian to demonstrate the evils of life without a centralized shrine and single political authority.

Women did have some role in the ritual life of religion as represented in the Bible though they could not be priests; but then neither could just any man. Only male Levites could be priests. Women (as well as men) were required to make a pilgrimage to the Temple in Jerusalem once a year (men each of the three main festivals if they could) and offer the Passover sacrifice. They would also do so on special occasions in their lives such as giving a todah ("thanksgiving") offering after childbirth. Hence, they participated in many of the major public religious roles that non-Levitical men could, albeit less often and on a somewhat smaller and generally more discreet scale. Old Testament scholar Christine Roy Yoder says that in the Book of Proverbs, the divine attribute of Holy Wisdom is presented as female. She points out that "on the one hand" such a reference elevates women, and "on the other hand" the "strange" woman also in Proverbs "perpetuates the stereotype of woman as either wholly good or wholly evil."

==== Economics ====
In traditional agrarian societies, a woman's role in the economic well-being of the household was an essential one. Ancient Israel had no developed market economy for most of the Iron Age, so a woman's role in commodity production was essential for survival. Meyer's says that "women were largely responsible for food processing, textile production, and the fashioning of various household implements and containers (grinding tools, stone, and ceramic vessels, baskets, weaving implements, and sewing tools). Many of these tasks were not only time-consuming and physically demanding but also technologically sophisticated. ... As anthropologist Jack Goody noted, because women could transform the raw into the cooked and produce other essential commodities, they were seen as having the ability to "work ... wonders."

This translated into a share of power in the household. According to Meyer, women had a say in activities related to production and consumption, the allocation of household spaces and implements, supervision and assignment of tasks, and the use of resources in their own households and sometimes across households. Meyers adds that "in traditional societies comparable to ancient Israel, when women and men both make significant economic contributions to household life, female–male relationships are marked by interdependence or mutual dependence. Thus, for many—but not all—household processes in ancient Israel, the marital union would have been a partnership. The different gendered components of household life cannot be lumped together; men dominated some aspects, women others.

A number of biblical texts, even with their androcentric perspective, support this conclusion. Women's managerial agency can be identified in some legal stipulations of the Covenant Code, in several narratives, and in Proverbs". This assessment relies on "ethnographic evidence from traditional societies, not on how those tasks are viewed today in industrialized societies".

==== Sex, marriage and family ====
Talmudic scholar Judith Hauptman says marriage and family law in the Bible favored men over women. For example, a husband could divorce a wife if he chose to, but a wife could not divorce a husband without his consent. The law said a woman could not make a binding vow without the consent of her male authority, so she could not legally marry without male approval. The practice of levirate marriage applied to widows of childless deceased husbands, not to widowers of childless deceased wives. If either he or she did not consent to the marriage, a different ceremony called chalitza was done instead; this involves the widow removing her brother-in-law's shoe, spitting in front of him, and proclaiming, "This is what happens to someone who will not build his brother's house!".

Laws concerning the loss of female virginity have no male equivalent. Women in biblical times depended on men economically. Women had the right to own property jointly with their husbands, except in the rare case of inheriting land from a father who did not bear sons. Even "in such cases, women would be required to remarry within the tribe so as not to reduce its land holdings." Property was transferred through the male line and women could not inherit unless there were no male heirs (Numbers 27:1–11; 36:1–12). These and other gender-based differences found in the Torah suggest that women were seen as subordinate to men; however, they also suggest that biblical society viewed continuity, property, and family unity as more important than any individual.

Philosopher Michael Berger says, the rural family was the backbone of biblical society. Women did tasks as important as those of men, managed their households, and were equals in daily life, but all public decisions were made by men. Men had specific obligations they were required to perform for their wives including the provision of clothing, food, and sexual relations. Ancient Israel was a frontier and life was "tough". Everyone was a "small holder" and had to work hard to survive. A large percentage of children died early, and those that survived, learned to share the burdens and responsibilities of family life as they grew. The marginal environment required a strict authority structure: parents had to not just be honored but not be challenged. Ungovernable children, especially adult children, had to be kept in line or eliminated. Respect for the dead was obligatory, and sexual lines were rigidly drawn. Virginity was expected, adultery the worst of crimes, and even suspicion of adultery led to trial by ordeal.

Adultery was defined differently for men than for women: a woman was an adulteress if she had sexual relations outside her marriage, but if a man had sexual relations outside his marriage with an unmarried woman, a concubine or a prostitute, it was not considered adultery on his part. A woman was considered "owned by a master". The deuterocanonical law regarding the beautiful captive woman regulates the rape of a female slave taken in war.

The zonah of the Hebrew Bible is a woman who is not under the authority of a man; she may be a paid prostitute, but not necessarily. In the Bible, for a woman or girl who was under the protection of a man to be called a "zonah" was a grave insult to her and her family. The zonah is shown as lacking protection, making each zonah vulnerable and available to other men; the lack of a specific man governing her meant that she was free to act in ways that other women were not. According to David Blumenthal, the Bible depicts the zonah as "dangerous, fearsome and threatening by her freedom, and yet appealing and attractive at the same time." Her freedom is recognized by biblical law and her sexual activity is not punishable. She is the source of extra-institutional sex. Therefore, she is seen as a threat to patriarchy and the family structure it supports. Over time, the term "zonah" came to be applied to a married woman who committed adultery, and that sense of the term was used as a metaphor for the Jewish people being unfaithful to Yahweh, especially in the Book of Hosea and the Book of Ezekiel, where the descriptions of sexual acts and punishments are both brutal and pornographic.

=== Hagar and Sarah ===
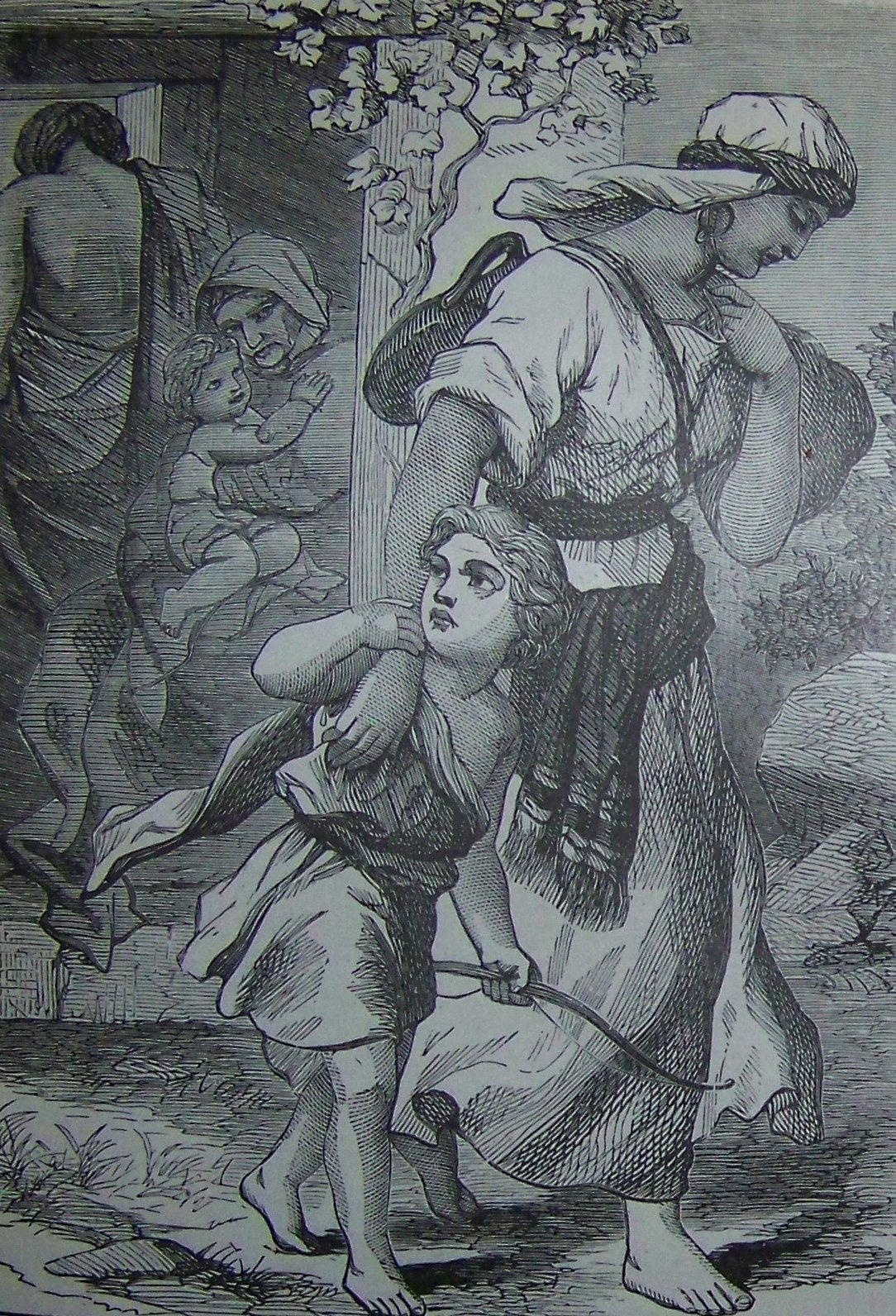
Hagar and Ishmael cast out, 1890 illustration

Abraham is an important figure in the Bible, yet "his story pivots on two women." Sarah was Abraham's wife and Hagar was Sarah's personal slave who became Abraham's concubine. Sarah is introduced in the Bible with only her name and that she is "barren" and without child. She had borne no children though God had promised them a child. Sarah is the first of barren women introduced, and the theme of infertility remains present throughout the matriarch narratives (Genesis 11:30, 25:21; 30:1–2).

Later in the story Sarah overhears God's promise that she is to bear a child, and she does not believe it. "Abraham and Sarah were already very old, and Sarah was past the age of childbearing. Sarah laughed to herself as she thought, "After I am worn out and my lord is old, will I now have this pleasure?" (Genesis 18:10–15). Sarah's response to God's promise could imply different interpretations including the lack of Abraham's sexual response to Sarah, Sarah's emotional numbness due to infertility has put her in disbelief, or more traditionally, Sarah is relieved, and God has brought "joy out of sorrow through the birth of Issac". Later on, Sarah relies on her beauty and gives her slave Hagar to Abraham as a concubine. Abraham then has sexual relations with her and Hagar becomes pregnant.

Sarah hopes to build a family through Hagar, but Hagar "began to despise her mistress" (Genesis 16:4). Then Sarah mistreated Hagar, who fled. God spoke to the slave Hagar in the desert, sent her home, and she bore Abraham a son, Ishmael, "a wild donkey of a man" (Genesis 16:12). The text suggests that Sarah had made a mistake which could have been avoided if there had been a strong maternal-type presence to guide her.

When Ishmael was 13, Abraham received the covenant practice of circumcision, and circumcised every male of his household. Sarah became pregnant and bore a son that they named Isaac when Abraham was a hundred years old. When Isaac was eight days old, Abraham circumcised him as well. Hagar and Ishmael are sent away again, and this time they do not return (Genesis 21:1–5). Frymer-Kensky says "This story starkly illuminates the relations between women in a patriarchy." She adds that it demonstrates the problems associated with gender intersecting with the disadvantages of class: Sarah has the power, her actions are legal, not compassionate, but her motives are clear: "she [Sarah] is vulnerable, making her incapable of compassion toward her social inferior."

=== Lot's daughters ===
Genesis 19 narrates that Lot and his two daughters live in Sodom, and are visited by two angels. A mob gathers, and Lot offers them his daughters to protect the angels, but the angels intervene. Sodom is destroyed, and the family goes to live in a cave. Since there are no men around except Lot, the daughters decide to make him drink wine and have him unknowingly impregnate them. They each have a son, Moab and Ben-Ammi.

=== Other women in Genesis and Exodus ===
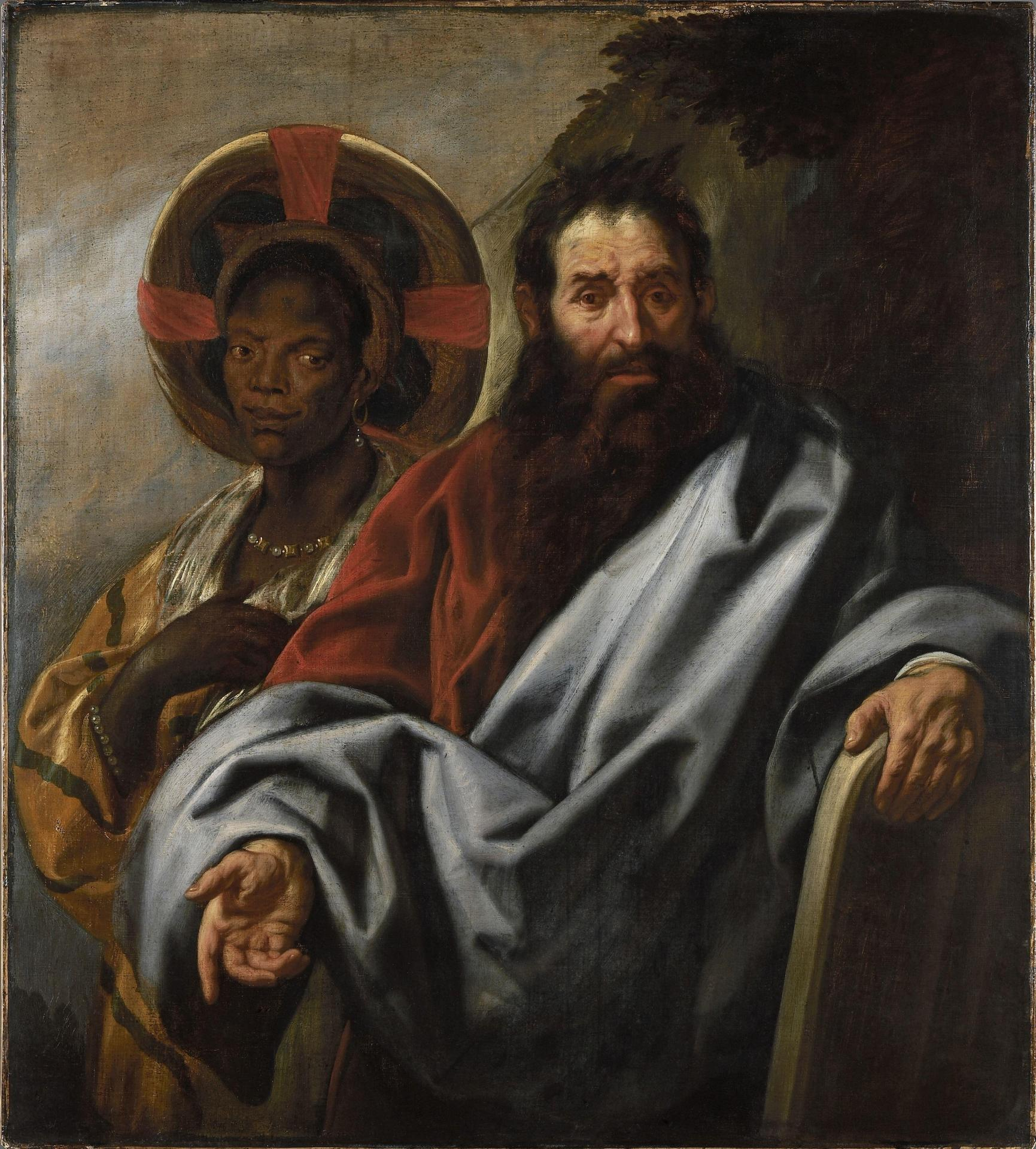
Moses and his Ethiopian wife Zipporah (Mozes en zijn Ethiopische vrouw Sippora). Jacob Jordaens, c. 1650

Potiphar's wife makes a false accusation against Joseph, leading to his imprisonment.

Pharaoh's Daughter rescues and cares for the infant Moses.

Shiphrah and Puah, two Hebrew midwives who disobey Pharaoh's command to kill all newborn Hebrew boys. God favors them for this. Moses' wife Zipporah, who saves his life when God intends to kill him. Miriam, Moses' sister, a prophetess. Cozbi, a woman slain by Phinehas shortly before the Midian war.

=== Rahab ===
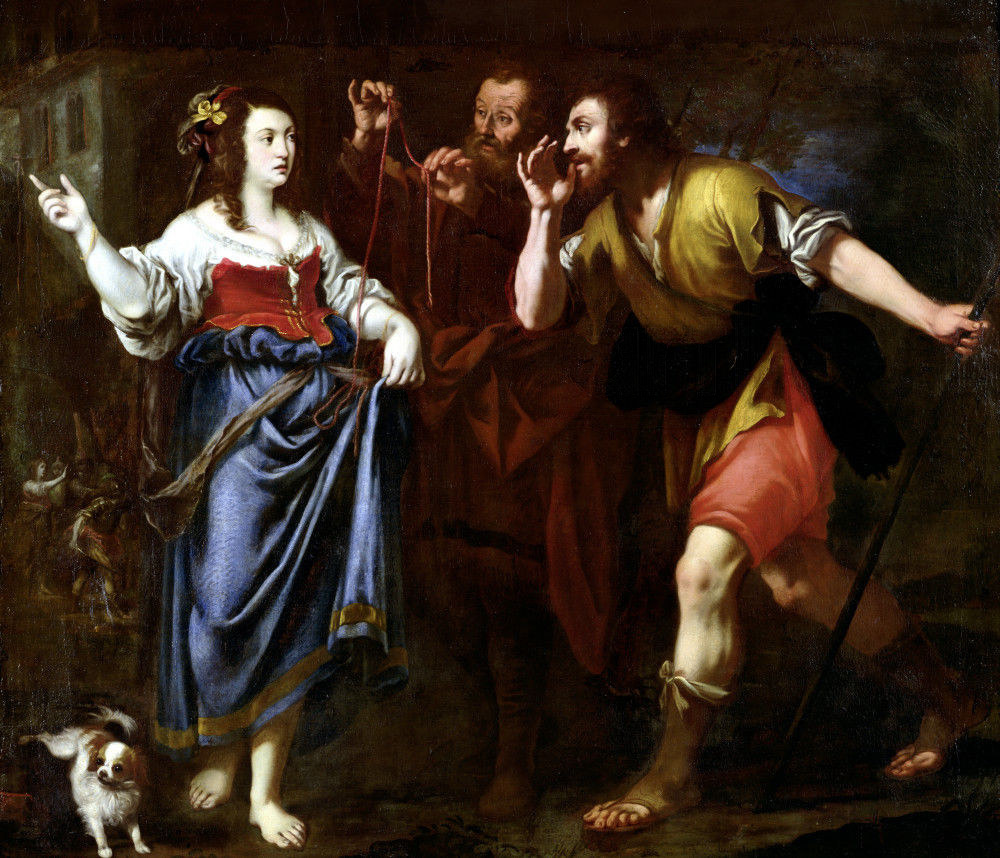
Rahab and the Emissaries of Joshua, 17th century

The book of Joshua tells the story of Rahab the prostitute (zonah), a resident of Jericho, who houses two spies sent by Joshua to prepare for an attack on the city. The king of Jericho knew the spies were there and sent soldiers to her house to capture them, but she hid them, sent the soldiers off in misdirection, and lied to the King on their behalf. She said to the spies, "I know that the Lord has given you this land and that a great fear of you has fallen on us, so that all who live in this country are melting in fear because of you. We have heard how the Lord dried up the water of the Red Sea for you when you came out of Egypt, and what you did to Sihon and Og, the two kings of the Amorites east of the Jordan, whom you completely destroyed. When we heard of it, our hearts melted in fear and everyone's courage failed because of you, for the Lord your God is God in heaven above and on the earth below. Now then, please swear to me by the Lord that you will show kindness to my family, because I have shown kindness to you. Give me a sure sign that you will spare the lives of my father and mother, my brothers and sisters, and all who belong to them—and that you will save us from death." (Joshua 2:9–13) She was told to tie a scarlet cord in the same window through which she helped the spies escape, and to have all her family in the house with her and not to go into the streets, and if she did not comply, their blood would be on their own heads. She did comply, and she and her whole family were saved before the city was captured and burned (Joshua 6).

=== Delilah ===
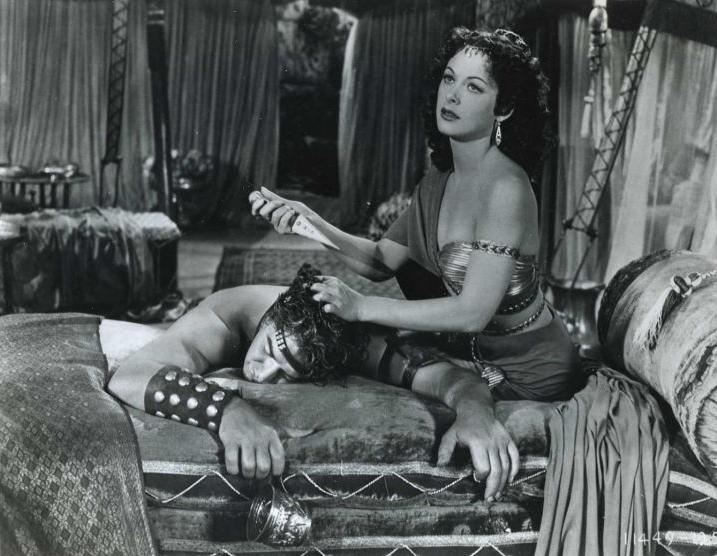
Still photo from Samson and Delilah (1949)

Judges chapters 13 to 16 tell the story of Samson who meets Delilah and his end in chapter 16. Samson was a Nazarite, a specially dedicated individual, from birth, yet his story indicates he violated every requirement of the Nazarite vow. Long hair was only one of the symbolic representations of his special relationship with God, and it was the last one that Samson violated. Nathan MacDonald explains that touching the carcass of the lion and Samson's celebration of his wedding to a Philistine can be seen as the initial steps that led to his end. Samson travels to Gaza and "fell in love with a woman in the Valley of Sorek whose name was Delilah. The rulers of the Philistines went to her and said, "See if you can lure him into showing you the secret of his great strength and how we can overpower him so we may tie him up and subdue him. Each one of us will give you eleven hundred shekels of silver." Samson lies to her a couple of times then tells her the truth. "Then the Philistines seized him, gouged out his eyes and took him down to Gaza. Binding him with bronze shackles, they set him to grinding grain in the prison. But the hair on his head began to grow again after it had been shaved."

"Now the rulers of the Philistines assembled to offer a great sacrifice to Dagon their god and to celebrate, saying, "Our god has delivered Samson, our enemy, into our hands." And they brought Samson out to entertain each other. But Samson prayed, "O Lord, remember me" and he pushed the columns holding up the Temple and killed everyone there.

The story does not call Delilah a Philistine. The valley of Sorek was Danite territory that had been overrun by Philistines, so the population there would have been mixed. Delilah was likely an Israelite or the story would have said otherwise. The Philistines offered Delilah an enormous sum of money to betray Samson. Art has generally portrayed Delilah as a type of femme fatale, but the biblical term used (pattî) means to persuade with words. Delilah uses emotional blackmail and Samson's genuine love for her to betray him. No other Hebrew biblical hero is ever defeated by an Israelite woman. Samson does not suspect, perhaps because he cannot think of a woman as dangerous, but Delilah is determined, bold and very dangerous indeed. The entire Philistine army could not bring him down. Delilah did, but it was Samson himself who made that possible.

=== The Levite's concubine ===
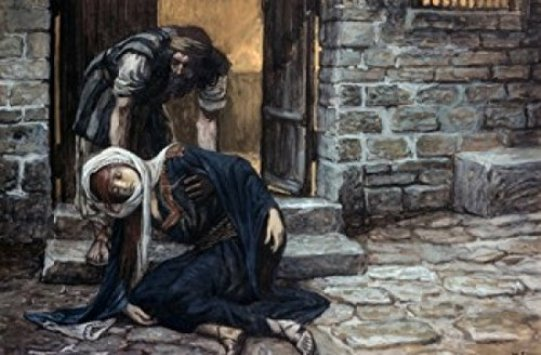
The Levite finds his concubine lying on the doorstep, James Tissot, 19th century

The Levite's concubine in the book of Judges is "vulnerable as she is only a minor wife, a concubine". She is one of the biblical nameless. Frymer-Kensky says this story is also an example of class intersecting with gender and power: when she is unhappy she runs home, only to have her father give her to another, the Levite. The Levite and his concubine travel to a strange town where they are vulnerable because they travel alone without extended family to rescue them; strangers attack. To protect the Levite, his host offers his daughter to the mob and the Levite sends out his concubine. Trible says "The story makes us realize that in those days men had ultimate powers of disposal over their women." Frymer-Kensky says the scene is similar to one in the Sodom and Gomorrah story when Lot sent his daughters to the mob, but in Genesis the angels save them, and in the book of Judges God is no longer intervening. The concubine is raped to death.

The Levite butchers her body and uses it to rouse Israel against the tribe of Benjamin. Civil war follows nearly wiping out an entire tribe. To resuscitate it, hundreds of women are captured and forced into marriage. Fryman-Kensky says, "Horror follows horror." The narrator caps off the story with "in those days there was no king in Israel and every man did as he pleased." The decline of Israel is reflected in the violence against women that takes place when government fails and social upheaval occurs.

According to Old Testament scholar Jerome Creach, some feminist critiques of Judges say the Bible gives tacit approval to violence against women by not speaking out against these acts. Frymer-Kensky says leaving moral conclusions to the reader is a recognized method of writing called gapping used in many Bible stories. Biblical scholar Michael Patrick O'Connor attributed acts of violence against women described in the Book of Judges to a period of crisis in the society of ancient Israel before the institution of kingship. Yet others have alleged such problems are innate to patriarchy.

=== Tamar, daughter-in-Law of Judah ===
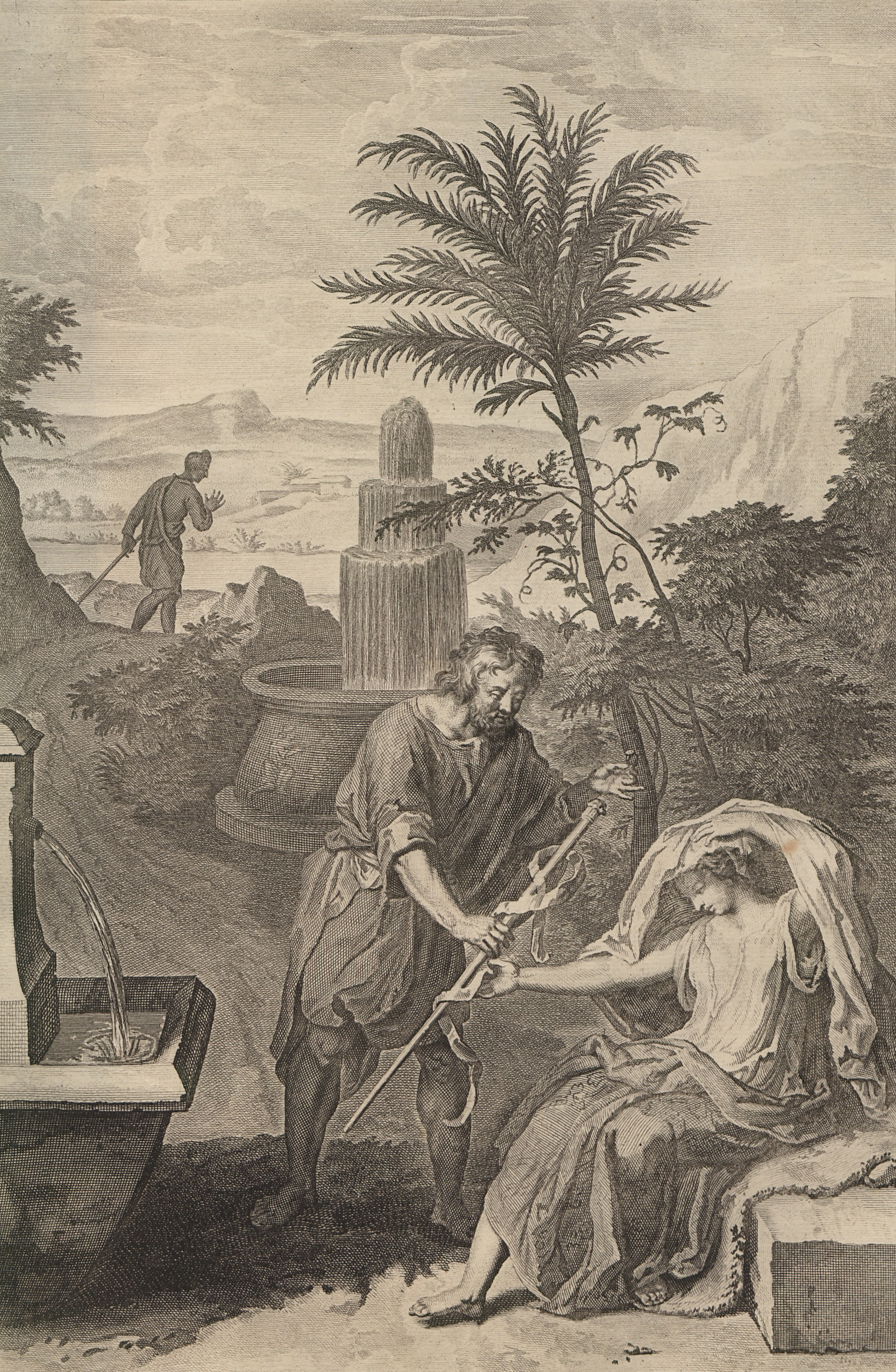
Judah Gives his Pledge to Tamar, 16th century illustration

In the Book of Genesis, Tamar is Judah's daughter-in-law. She was married to Judah's son Er, but Er died, leaving Tamar childless. Under levirate law, Judah's next son, Onan, was told to have sex with Tamar and give her a child, but when Onan slept with her, he "spilled his seed on the ground" rather than give her a child that would belong to his brother. Then Onan died too. "Judah then said to his daughter-in-law Tamar, 'Live as a widow in your father's household until my son Shelah grows up.' For he thought, 'He may die too, just like his brothers'." (Genesis 38:11) But when Shelah grew up, she was not given to him as his wife. One day Judah travels to town (Timnah) to shear his sheep. Tamar "took off her widow's clothes, covered herself with a veil to disguise herself, and then sat down at the entrance to Enaim, which is on the road to Timnah. When Judah saw her, he thought she was a prostitute, for she had covered her face. Not realizing that she was his daughter-in-law, he went over to her by the roadside and said, 'Come now, let me sleep with you'."(Genesis 38:14) He said he would give her something in return and she asked for a pledge, accepting his staff and his seal with its cord as earnest of later payment. So Judah slept with her and she became pregnant. Then she went home and put on her widow's weeds again. Months later when it was discovered she was pregnant, she was accused of prostitution (zonah), and was set to be burned. Instead, she sent Judah's pledge offerings to him saying "I am pregnant by the man who owns these." Judah recognized them and said, "She is more righteous than I, since I wouldn't give her to my son Shelah."

=== Jephthah's daughter ===
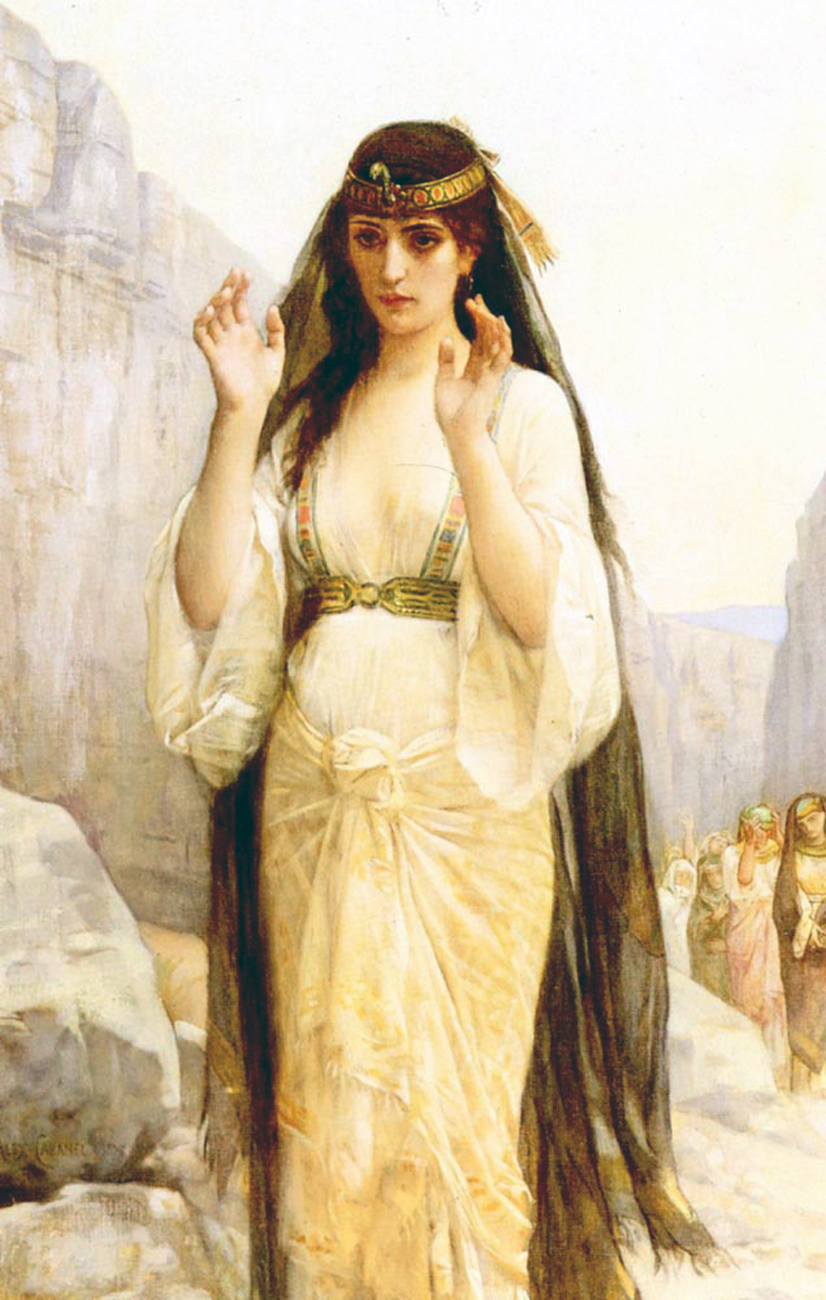
The Daughter of Jephthah, by Alexandre Cabanel (1879)

The story of Jephthah's daughter in Book of Judges begins as an archetypal biblical hagiography of a hero. Jephthah is the son of a marginal woman, a prostitute (zonah), and as such he is vulnerable. He lives in his father's house, but when his father dies, his half-brothers reject him. According to Frymer-Kensky, "This is not right. In the ancient Near East prostitutes could be hired as surrogate wombs as well as sex objects. Laws and contracts regulated the relationship between the child of such a prostitute and children of the first wife... he could not be disinherited. Jephthah has been wronged, but he has no recourse. He must leave home." Frymer-Kensky says the author assumes the biblical audience is familiar with this, will know Jephthah has been wronged, and will be sympathetic to him.

Nevertheless, Jephthah goes out into the world and makes a name for himself as a mighty warrior—a hero of Israel. The threat of the Ammonites is grave. The brothers acknowledge their wrongdoing to gain his protection. Frymer-Kensky says Jephthah's response reveals negotiation skills and deep piety. Then he attempts to negotiate peace with Ammon but fails. War comes, with all of Israel vulnerable. Before the battle he makes a battle vow: "If you give the Ammonites into my hand...the one who comes out of the doors of my house...I will offer to YHWH." This turns out to be his daughter. Jephthah's reaction expresses his horror and sense of tragedy in three key expressions of mourning, utter defeat, and reproach. He reproaches her and himself, but foresees only his doom in either keeping or breaking his vow. Jephthah's daughter responds to his speech and she becomes a true heroine of this story. They are both good, yet tragedy happens. Frymer-Kensky summarizes: "The vulnerable heroine is sacrificed, the hero's name is gone." She adds, the author of the book of Judges knew people were sacrificing their children and the narrator of Judges is in opposition. "The horror is the very reason this story is in the book of Judges."

Some scholars have interpreted this story to mean that Jephthah's daughter was not actually sacrificed, but kept in seclusion.

=== Asenath ===
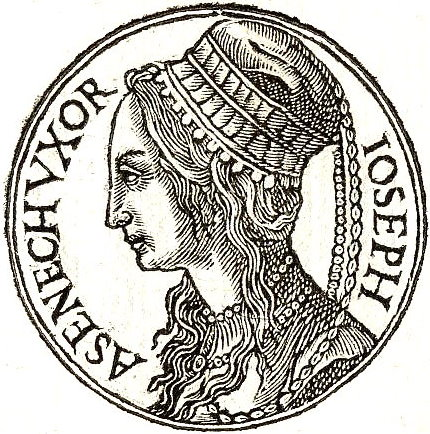
Asenath from Guillaume Rouillé's Promptuarii Iconum Insigniorum

First mentioned in Genesis 41:45, Asenath is said to be the wife of Joseph and the mother of his sons, Manasseh and Ephraim. In the Book of Genesis, she is referred to as the daughter of Potipherah priest of On (Gk. Heliopolis). In the Book of Jubilees, she is said to be given to Joseph to marry by Pharaoh, a daughter of Potiphar, a high priest of Heliopolis, with no clarification as to whether or not this Potiphar is the same Potiphar whose wife falsely accused Joseph of attempting to rape her. While in the Midrash and Targum Pseudo-Jonathan, she is said to be the daughter of Dinah, Joseph's sister, and Shechem, born of an illicit union, described as either premarital sex or rape, depending on the narrative.

=== Tamar, daughter of David ===
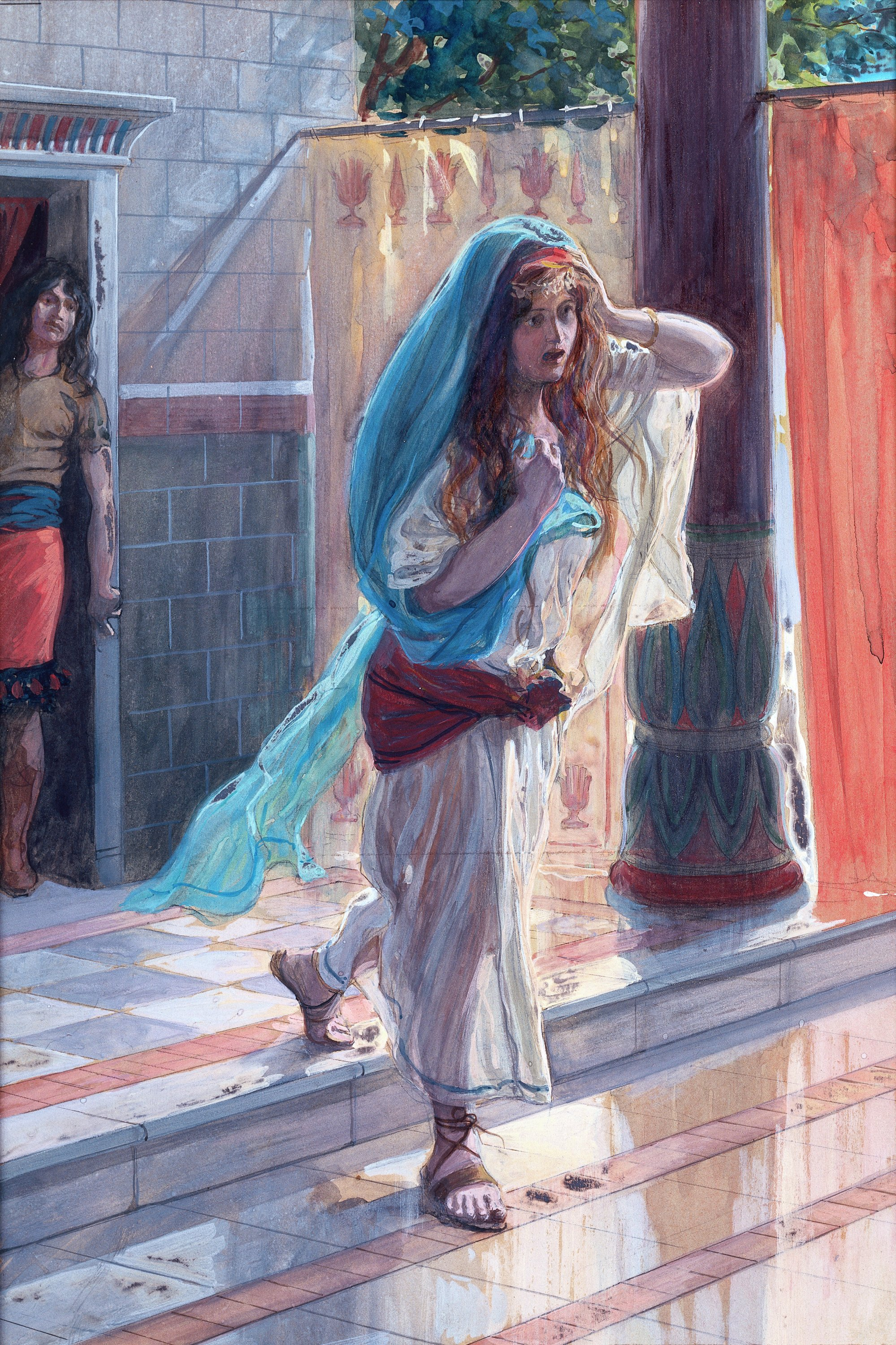
Desolation of Tamar by James Tissot, c. 1900

The story of Tamar is a literary unit consisting of seven parts. According to Frymer-Kensky, the story "has received a great deal of attention as a superb piece of literature, and several have concentrated on explicating the artistry involved." This story (2 Samuel) focuses on three of King David's children, Amnon the first born, Absalom the beloved son, and his beautiful sister Tamar.

Amnon desires Tamar deeply. Immediately after explaining Amnon's desire the narrator first uses the term sister to reveal Tamar is not only Absalom's sister but is also Amnon's sister by another mother. Phyllis Trible says the storyteller "stresses family ties for such intimacy exacerbates the coming tragedy." Full of lust, the prince is impotent to act; Tamar is a virgin and protected. Then comes a plan from his cousin Jonadab, "a very crafty man".

Jonadab's scheme to aid Amnon pivots on David the king. Amnon pretends to be sick and David comes to see him. He asks that his sister Tamar make him food and feed him. The king orders it sending a message to Tamar. Amnon sends the servants away. Alone with her brother she is vulnerable, but Tamar claims her voice. Frymer-Kensky says Tamar speaks to Amnon with wisdom, but she speaks to a foolish man. She attempts to dissuade him, then offers the alternative of marriage, and tells him to appeal to the king. He does not listen, and rapes her.

Amnon is immediately full of shame and angrily throws Tamar out. "No!" she said to him. "Sending me away would be a greater wrong than what you have already done to me." But he refuses to listen. Tamar is desolate: ruined and miserable. King David is furious but he does nothing to avenge his daughter or punish his son. Frymer Kensky says "The reader of the story who expects that the state will provide protection for the vulnerable now sees that the state cannot control itself." Absalom is filled with hatred, and kills Amnon two years later. Absalom then rebels against his father and is also killed.

=== Bathsheba ===
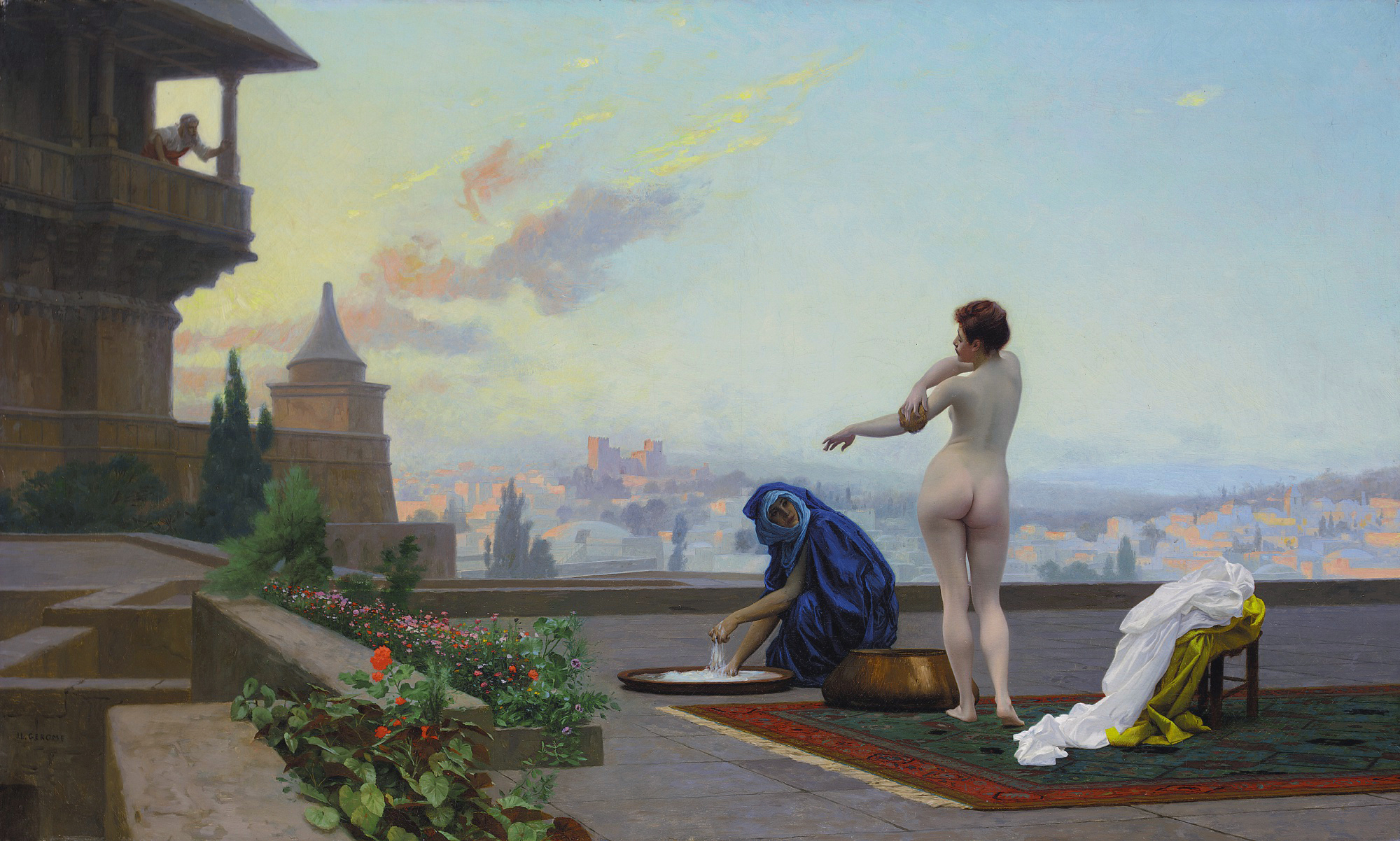
Jean-Léon Gérôme's depiction of Bathsheba bathing watched by David

In the Book of Samuel, Bathsheba is a married woman who is noticed by king David while she is bathing. He has her brought to him, and she becomes pregnant. The text in the Bible does not explicitly state whether Bathsheba consented to sex. David successfully plots the death of her husband Uriah, and she becomes one of David's wives. Their child is killed as divine punishment, but Bathsheba later has another child, Solomon. In the Book of Kings, when David is old, she and the prophet Nathan convince David to let Solomon take the throne instead of an older brother.

=== Susanna ===
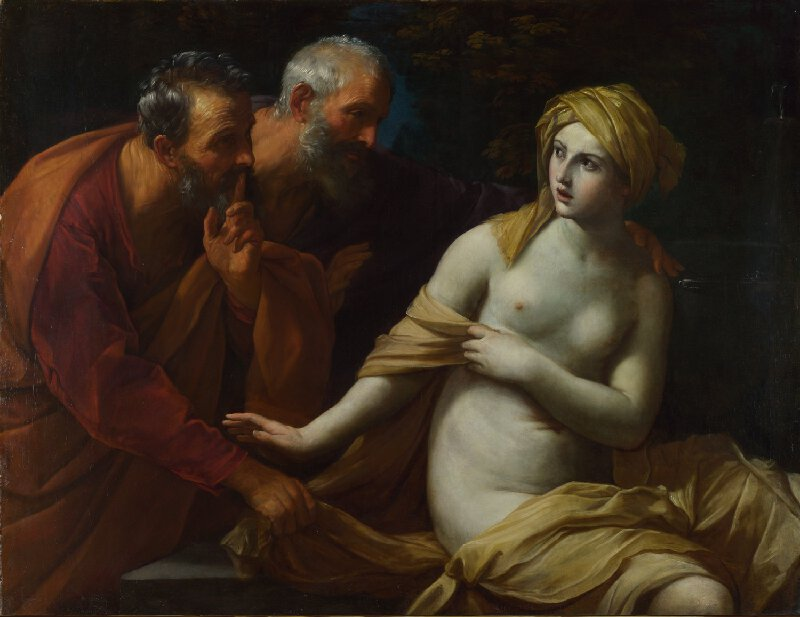
Susanna and the Elders by Guido Reni

The tale of Susanna is included in the Old Testament of the Roman Catholic and Eastern Orthodox churches. Susanna is a married, beautiful and law-abiding woman. Two elders, newly appointed judges, lust for her, and attempt to coerce her to have sex with them. She refuses, and the elders falsely testify that she has committed adultery with a young man. Susanna is condemned to death, and cries to God for help. God hears her, and makes Daniel come to her aid. Daniel exposes the lies of the elders, and they are put to death instead.

=== Hannah ===
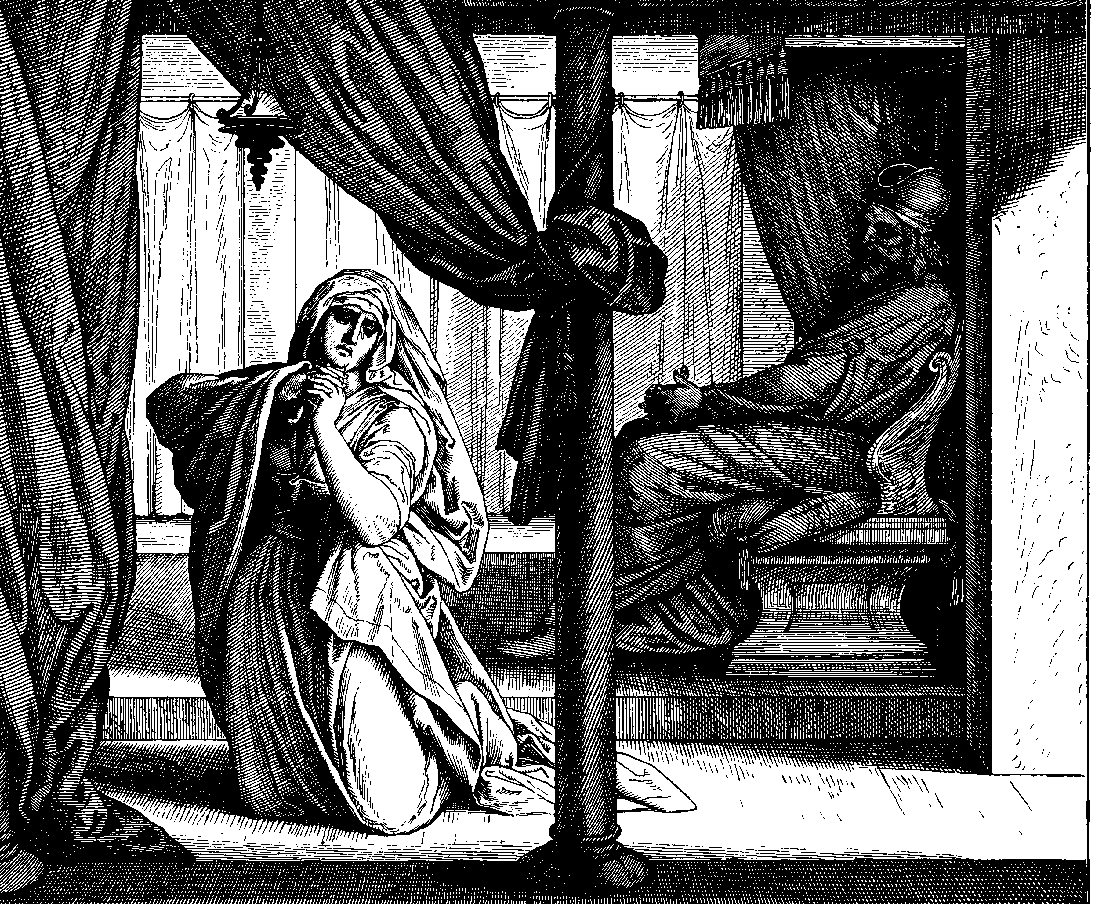
Hannah's prayer, 1860 woodcut by Julius Schnorr von Karolsfeld

Hannah is one of two wives of Elkanah. The other, Peninnah, had given birth to Elkanah's children, but Hannah remained childless. Nevertheless, Elkanah preferred Hannah. According to Lillian Klein, the use of this chiasmus underscores the standing of the women: Hannah is the primary wife, yet Peninnah has succeeded in bearing children. Hannah's status as primary wife and her barrenness recall Sarah and Rebecca in Genesis 17 and Genesis 25 respectively. Klein suggests that Elkanah took Peninnah as a second wife because of Hannah's barrenness.

Every year, Elkanah would offer a sacrifice at the Shiloh sanctuary, and give Peninnah and her children a portion but he gave Hannah a double portion "because he loved her, and the LORD had closed her womb" (1 Samuel 1:5, NIV). One day Hannah went up to the Tabernacle and prayed with great weeping (I Samuel 1:10), while Eli the High Priest was sitting on a chair near the doorpost. In her prayer, she asked God for a son and in return she vowed to give the son back to God for the service of God. She promised he would remain a Nazarite all the days of his life. According to Lillian Klein, the value of women is demonstrably enhanced by their child-bearing capacities. The narrative takes her pain and places it in her personal failure and then draws it out in a communal context. The desperation of Hannah's vow indicates that merely bearing a male child would establish her in the community.

=== Eve ===
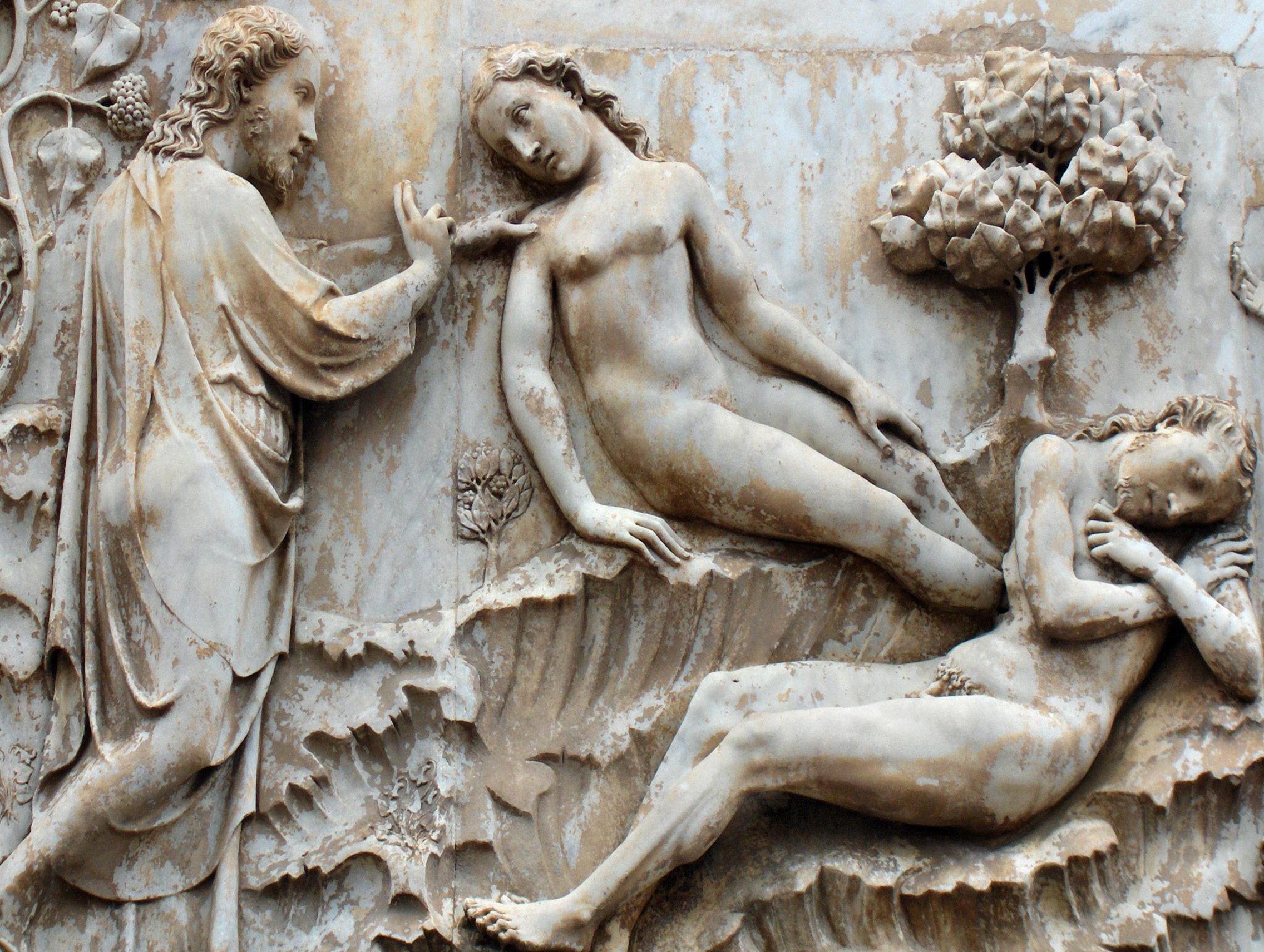
Creation of Eve, marble relief by Lorenzo Maitani, Orvieto Cathedral, Italy, c. 1300

The story of Eve begins in Genesis 2:18 with "The Lord God said, 'It is not good for the man to be alone. I will make a helper suitable for him'... Then the Lord God made a woman from the rib he had taken out of the man, and he brought her to the man... That is why a man leaves his father and mother and is united to his wife, and they become one flesh. Adam and his wife were both naked, and they felt no shame." (Genesis 2:18–25) Eve is deceived, tempted and indulges, then shares with her husband who apparently neither questions nor argues. Their eyes are opened and they realize they are naked, and they make coverings from fig leaves. When God comes to the garden, they hide, and God knows something is wrong. Both attempt to shift the blame, but they end up bearing the responsibility, each receiving their own curses, and getting thrown out of the garden together. (Genesis 2)

According to Meyers, "Perhaps more than any other part of the Bible, [the story of Eve] has influenced western notions of gender and identity." Sociologist Linda L. Lindsey says "women have born a greater burden for 'original sin'... Eve's creation from Adam's rib, second in order, with God's "curse" at the expulsion is a stubbornly persistent frame used to justify male supremacy." Trible and Frymer-Kensky find the story of Eve in Genesis implies no inferiority of Eve to Adam; the word helpmate (ezer) connotes a mentor in the Bible rather than an assistant and is used frequently for the relation of God to Israel (not Israel to God). Trible points out that, in mythology, the last-created thing is traditionally the culmination of creation, which is implied in Genesis 1 where man is created after everything else—except Eve. However, New Testament scholar Craig Blomberg says ancient Jews might have seen the order of creation in terms of the laws of primogeniture (both in their scriptures and in surrounding cultures) and interpreted Adam being created first as a sign of privilege.

=== Deborah and Jael ===
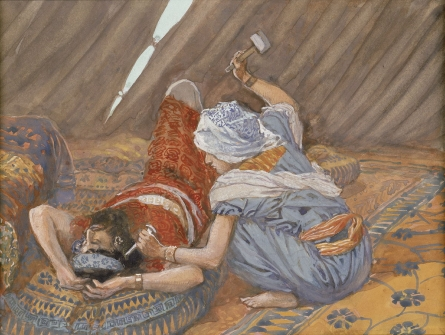
Jael smiting Sisera, James Tissot, c. 1900

The Book of Judges tells the story of Deborah, as a prophet (Judges 4:4), a judge of Israel (Judges 4:4–5), the wife of Lapidoth and a mother (Judges 5:7). She was based in the region between Ramah in Benjamin and Bethel in the land of Ephraim. Deborah could also be described as a warrior, leader of war, and a leader of faith. (Judges 4:6–22).

The narrative describes the people of Israel as having been oppressed by Jabin, the king of Canaan, for twenty years. Deborah sends a prophetic message to Barak to raise an army and fight them, but Barak refuses to do so without her. Deborah declares his refusal means the glory of the victory will belong to a woman. A battle is fought (led by Barak), and Sisera, the enemy commander, is defeated.

Sisera had summoned all his men and 900 iron chariots, but he was routed and fled on foot. "Barak pursued the chariots and army as far as Harosheth Haggoyim, and all Sisera's troops fell by the sword; not a man was left. Sisera, meanwhile, fled on foot to the tent of Jael, the wife of Heber the Kenite, because there was an alliance between Jabin king of Hazor and the family of Heber the Kenite." Jael gave him drink, covered him with a blanket, and when, exhausted from battle, Sisera slept, Jael picked up a tent peg and a hammer and drove the peg into his temple all the way into the ground and he died.

=== The Witch of Endor ===
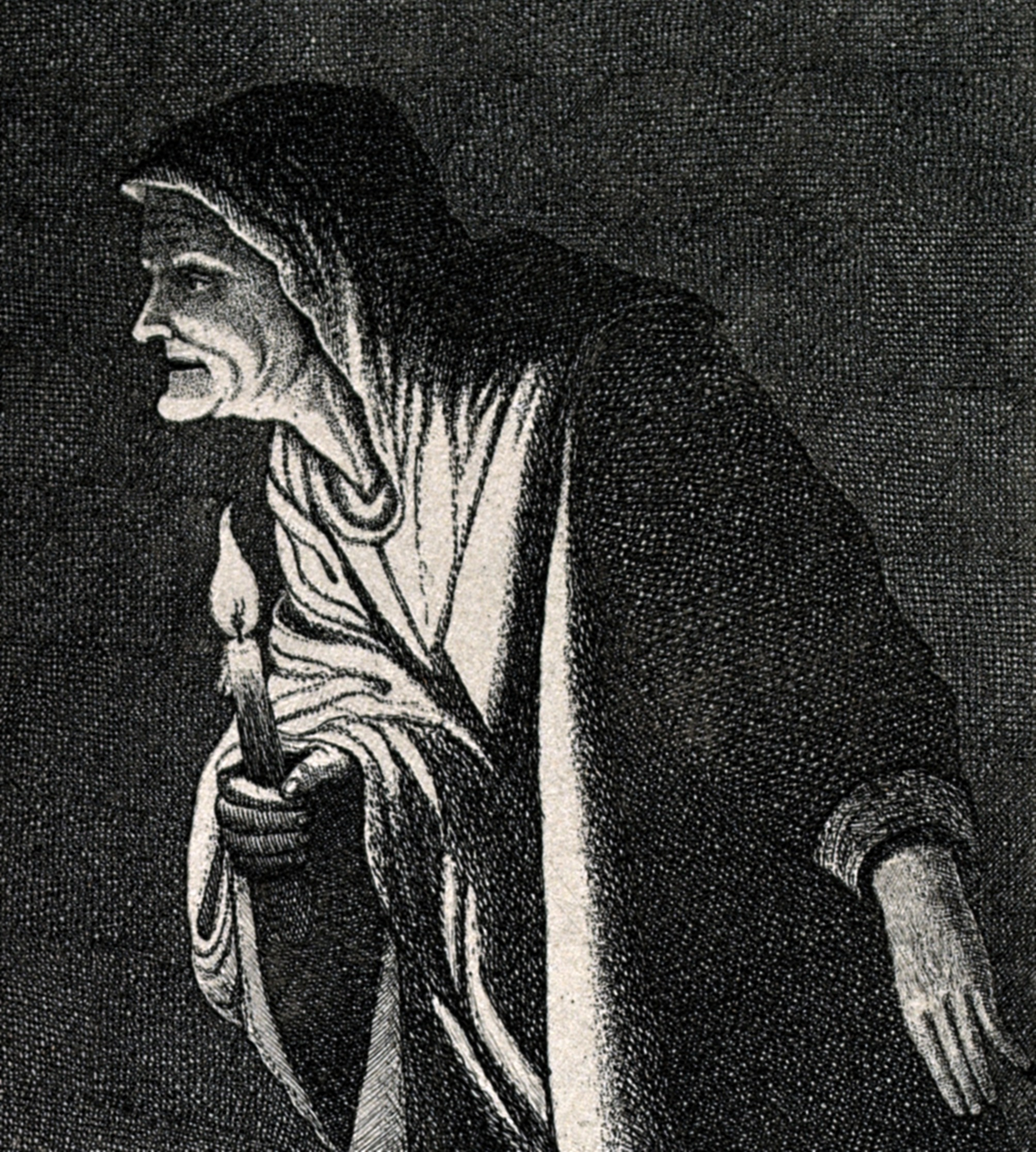
Witch of Endor by Adam Elsheimer

The Witch of Endor is a woman who summons the prophet Samuel's spirit, at the demand of King Saul of the Kingdom of Israel in the 28th chapter of the First Book of Samuel. Saul, the current King of Israel, seeks wisdom from God in choosing a course of action against the assembled forces of the Philistines. He receives no answer from dreams, prophets, or the Urim and Thummim. Having driven out all necromancers and magicians from Israel, Saul searches for a witch anonymously and in disguise. His search leads him to a woman of Endor, who claims that she can see the ghost of the deceased prophet Samuel rising from the abode of the dead.

The voice of the prophet's ghost at first frightens the witch of Endor, and after complaining of being disturbed, berates Saul for disobeying God, and predicts Saul's downfall. The spirit reiterates a pre-mortem prophecy by Samuel, adding that Saul will perish with his whole army in battle the next day. Saul is terrified. The next day, his army is defeated as prophesied, and Saul commits suicide.

Although Saul is depicted as an enemy to witches and diviners, the Witch of Endor comforts Saul when she sees his distress and insists on feeding him before he leaves.

=== Jezebel ===
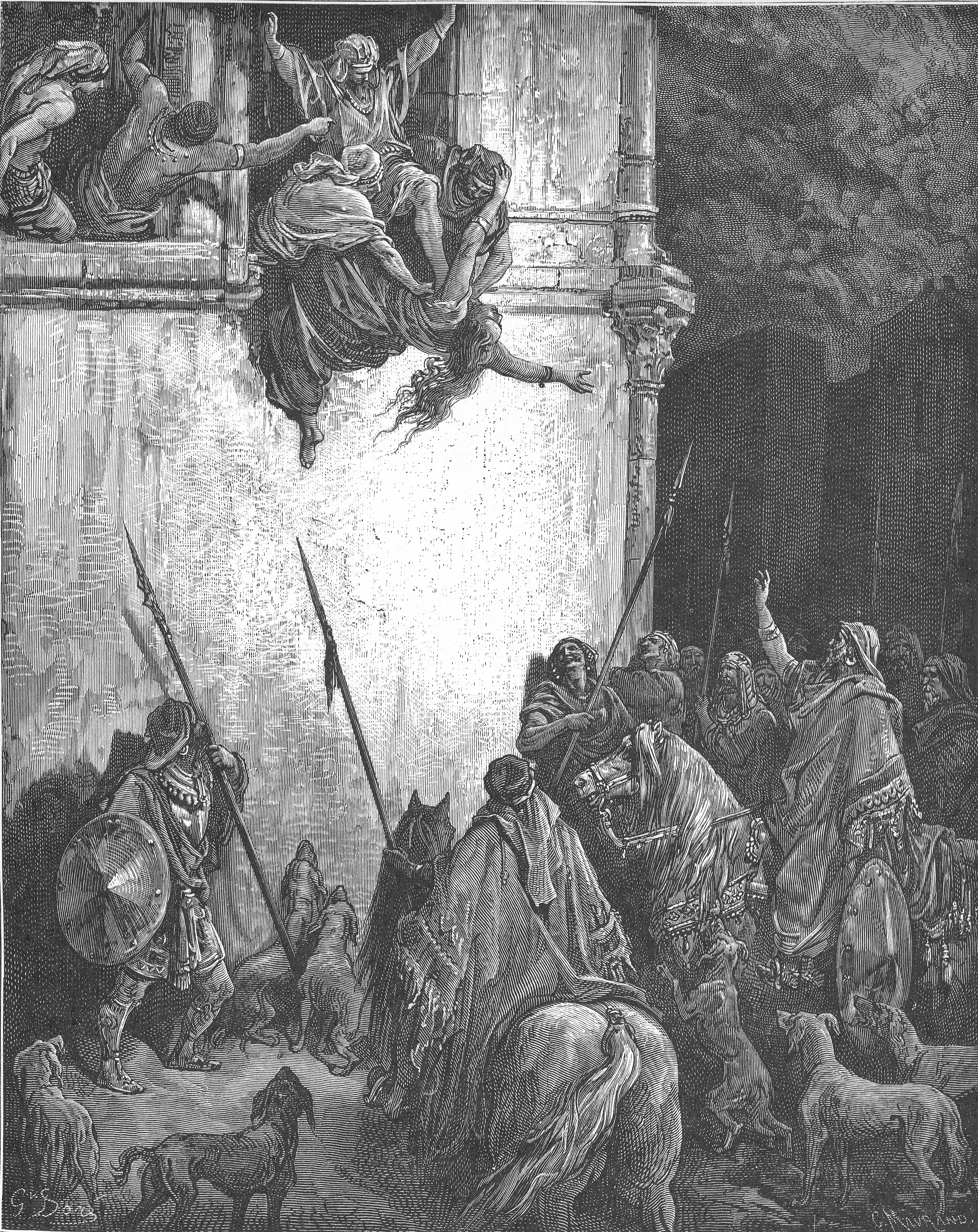
The Death of Jezebel, by Gustave Doré

Jezebel is described in the Book of Kings (1 Kings 16:31) as a queen who was the daughter of Ithobaal I of Sidon and the wife of Ahab, King of Israel.

According to the Books of Kings, Jezebel incited her husband King Ahab to abandon the worship of Yahweh and encourage worship of the deities Baal and Asherah instead. Jezebel persecuted the prophets of Yahweh, and fabricated evidence of blasphemy against an innocent landowner who refused to sell his property to King Ahab, causing the landowner to be put to death. For these transgressions against the God and people of Israel, Jezebel met a gruesome death—thrown out of a window by members of her own court retinue, and the flesh of her corpse eaten by stray dogs.

In the biblical story, Jezebel became associated with false prophets. In some interpretations, her dressing in finery and putting on makeup led to the association of the use of cosmetics with "painted women" or prostitutes.

=== Athaliah ===
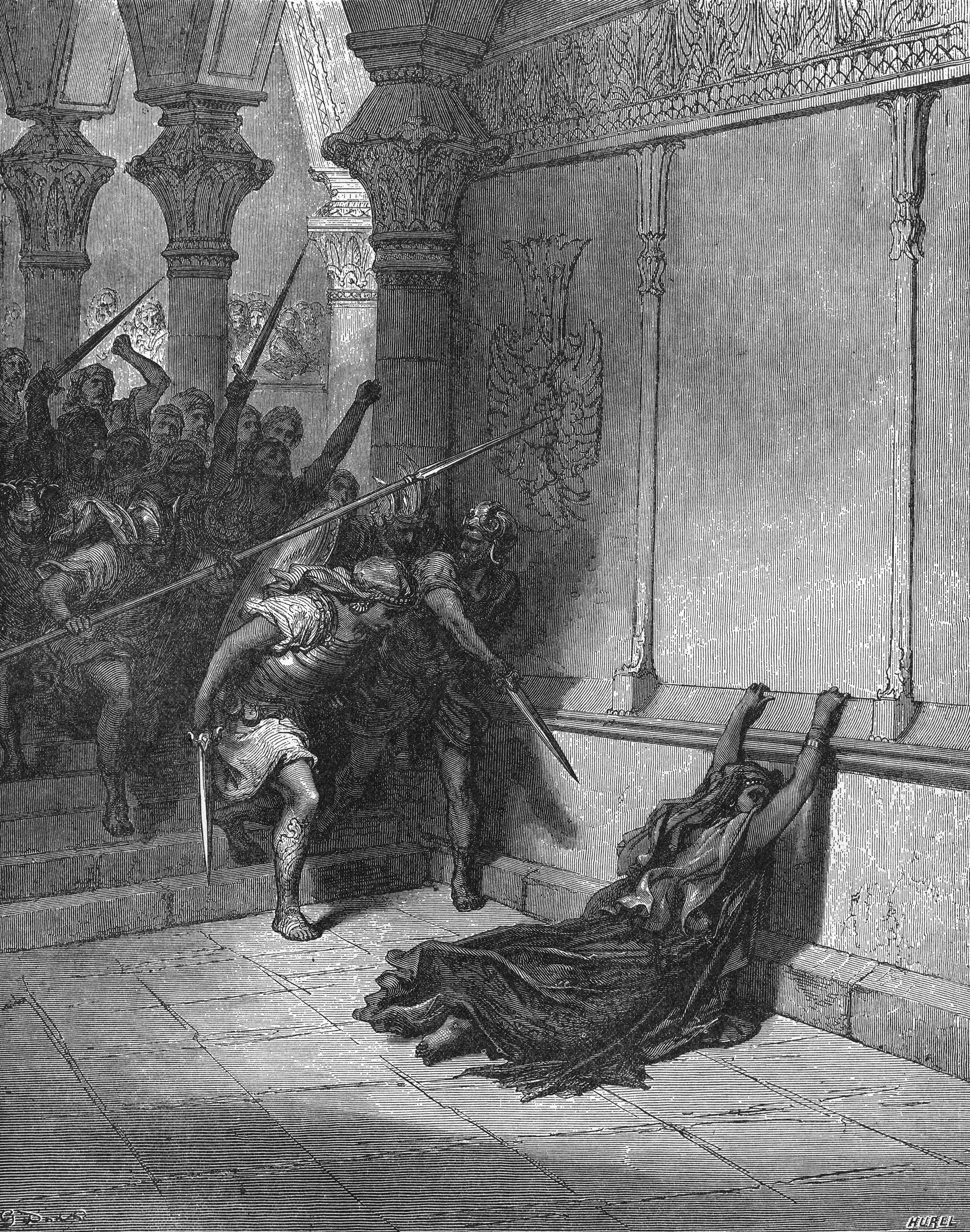
The Death of Athaliah by Gustave Doré

Athaliah was the daughter of Jezebel and King Ahab. Her story is told in 2 Kings 8:16 – 11:16 and 2 Chronicles 22:10–23:15. According to these passages, Athaliah married Jehoram, King of Judah. After her husband died, Athaliah's son Ahaziah came to the throne of Judah, but he reigned for only a year before being killed. When he died, Athaliah usurped the throne and ruled as Queen of Judah for six years. In an attempt to consolidate her position, she ordered all the royal house of Judah to be put to death, but unbeknownst to her, Jehosheba, Ahaziah's sister, managed to rescue from the purge one of Athaliah's grandsons with Jehoram of Judah, named Jehoash, who was only one year old. Jehoash was raised in secret by Jehosheba's husband, a priest named Jehoiada.

After six years of raising the boy in secret, Jehoiada revealed his existence and had him proclaimed King. Athaliah denounced this as treason, but a successful revolt was organised in his favour and Athaliah was put to death at the entrance of her palace.

=== The Shunammite woman ===
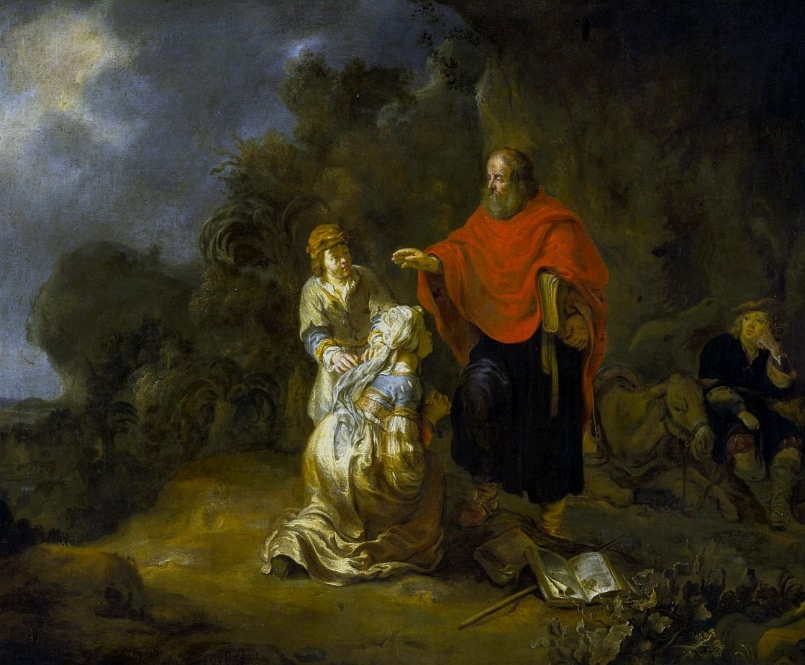
Elisha and the Shunammite woman. Gerbrand van den Eeckhout, 1649.

2 Kings 4 tells of a woman in Shunem who treated the prophet Elisha with respect, feeding him and providing a place for him to stay whenever he traveled through town. One day Elisha asked his servant what could be done for her and the servant said, she has no son. So Elisha called her and said, this time next year she would have a son. She does, the boy grows, and then one day he dies. She placed the child's body on Elisha's bed and went to find him. "When she reached the man of God at the mountain, she took hold of his feet. Gehazi came over to push her away, but the man of God said, 'Leave her alone! She is in bitter distress, but the Lord has hidden it from me and has not told me why.' 'Did I ask you for a son, my lord?' she said. 'Didn't I tell you, 'Don't raise my hopes'?" And she refuses to leave Elisha who goes and heals the boy.

Biblical scholar Burke Long says the "great woman" of Shunnem who appears in the Book of Kings acknowledges and respects the prophet Elisha's position yet is also a "determined mover and shaper of events." According to Frymer-Kensky, this narrative demonstrates how gender intersects with class in the Bible's portrayal of ancient Israel. The Shunammite's story takes place among the rural poor, and against this "backdrop of extreme poverty, the Shunammite is wealthy, giving her more boldness than poor women or sometimes even poor men." She is well enough off she is able to extend a kind of patronage to Elisha, and is independent enough she is willing to confront the prophet and King in pursuit of the well-being of her household.

=== Huldah ===
2 Kings 22 shows it was not unusual for women to be prophetesses in ancient Israel even if they could not be priests. Josiah the King was having the Temple repaired when the High Priest Hilkiah found the Book of the Law which had been lost. He gave it to Shaphan, the king's scribe, who read it, then gave it to King Josiah. The king tore his robes in distress and said "Go and inquire of the Lord for me ..." So they went to the prophet Huldah, the wife of Shallum. The text does not comment on the fact this prophet was a woman, but says only that they took her answer back to the king (verse 20) thereby demonstrating there was nothing unusual in a female prophet.

=== Abigail ===
Abigail was the wife of Nabal, a man who refused to assist the future king David after having accepted his help. Abigail, realizing David's anger will be dangerous to the entire household, acts immediately. She intercepts David bearing gifts and, with what Frymer-Kensky describes as Abigail's "brilliant rhetoric", convinces David not to kill anyone. When Nabal later dies, David weds her. Frymer-Kensky says "Once again an intelligent determined woman is influential far beyond the confines of patriarchy" showing biblical women had what anthropology terms informal power.

=== Ruth ===
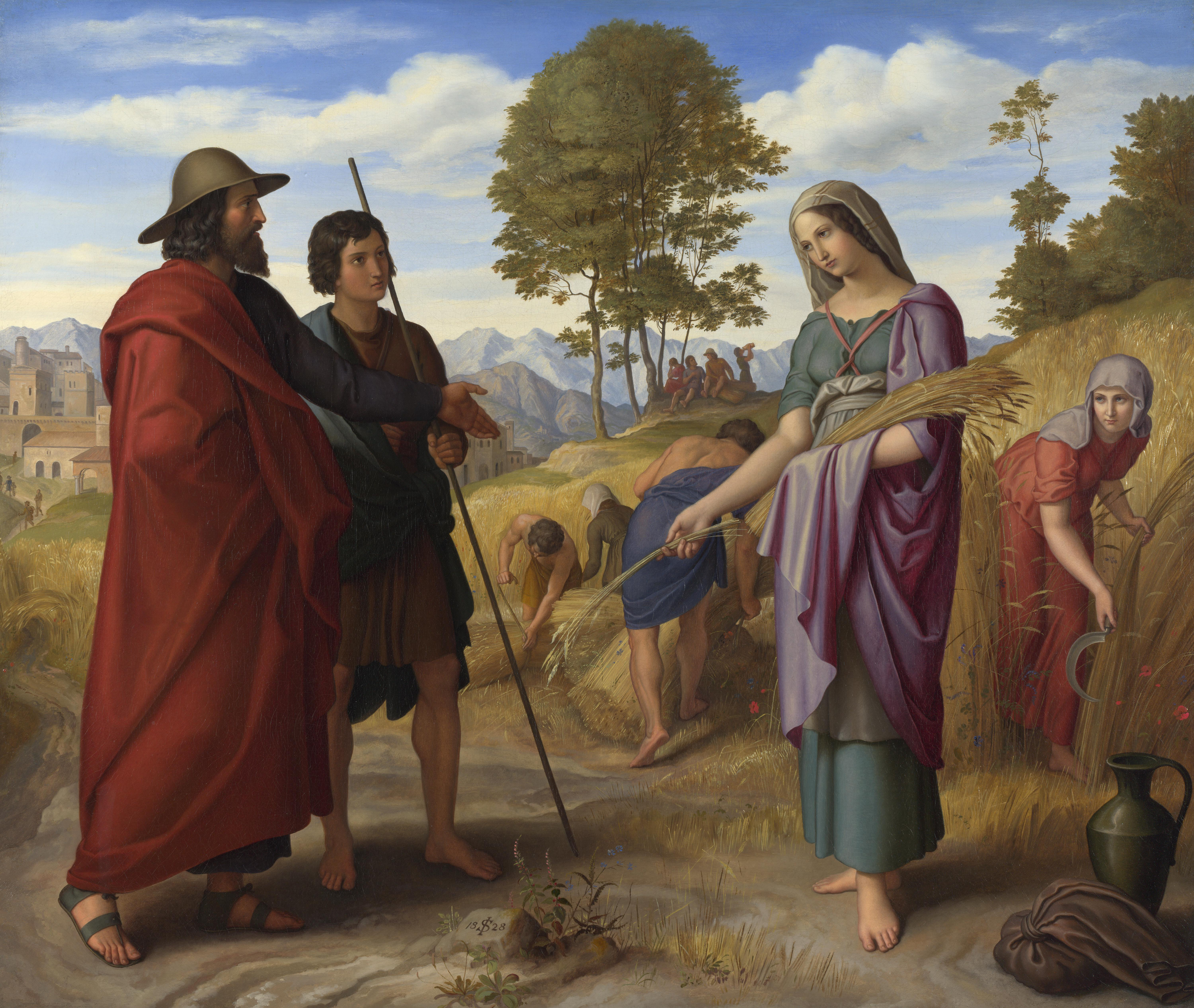
Ruth on the fields of Boaz by Julius Schnorr von Carolsfeld

Ruth is the title character of the Book of Ruth. In the narrative, she is not an Israelite but rather is from Moab; she marries an Israelite. Both her husband and her father-in-law die, and she helps her mother-in-law, Naomi, find protection. The two of them travel to Bethlehem together, where Ruth wins the love of Boaz through her kindness.

She is one of five women mentioned in the genealogy of Jesus found in the Gospel of Matthew, alongside Tamar, Rahab, the "wife of Uriah" (Bathsheba), and Mary.

=== Esther ===
Esther is described in the Book of Esther as a Jewish queen of the Persian king Ahasuerus. In the narrative, Ahasuerus seeks a new wife after his queen, Vashti, refuses to obey him, and Esther is chosen for her beauty. The king's chief advisor, Haman, is offended by Esther's cousin and guardian, Mordecai, and gets permission from the king to have all the Jews in the kingdom killed. Esther foils the plan, and wins permission from the king for the Jews to kill their enemies, and they do so. Her story is the traditional basis for the Jewish holiday Purim, which is celebrated on the date given in the story for when Haman's order was to go into effect, which is the same day that Jews kill their enemies after the plan is reversed.

== New Testament ==
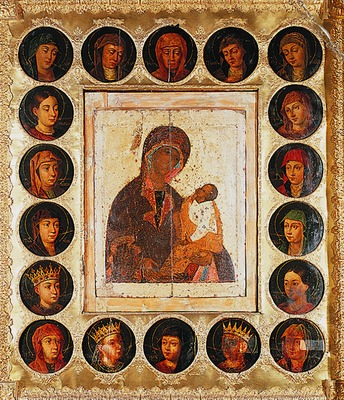
Eleusa icon, 15th century, with late 16th century frame of Old Testament women

The New Testament is the second part of the Christian Bible. It tells about the teachings and person of Jesus, as well as events in first-century Christianity. It consists of four narratives called gospels about the life, teaching, death and resurrection of Jesus. It includes a record of the Apostolic ministries in the early church, called the Acts of the Apostles; twenty-one letters called "epistles" written by various authors to specific groups with specific needs concerning Christian doctrine, counsel, instruction, and conflict resolution; and one Apocalyptic book, the Book of Revelation, which is a book of prophecy, containing some instructions to seven local congregations of Asia Minor, but mostly containing prophetical symbology about the end times.

=== Sex, Roman Empire and the early church ===
Sexuality (especially female sexuality) was at the heart of the early clash over Christianity's place in the world. Views on sexuality in the early church were diverse and fiercely debated within its various communities; these doctrinal debates took place within the boundaries of the ideas in Paul's letters and in the context of an often persecuted minority seeking to define itself from the world around it. In his letters, Paul often attempted to find a middle way between those who saw the gospel as liberating them from all moral boundaries, and those who took the position of total celibacy. For Paul, "the body was a consecrated space, a point of mediation between the individual and the divine", and in Paul's letters, porneia was a single name for the array of sexual behaviors outside marital intercourse. Paul's concept became the central defining concept of Christian sexual morality. Early Church Fathers advocated against adultery, polygamy, homosexuality, pederasty, bestiality, prostitution, and incest while advocating for the sanctity of the marriage bed.

Both the ancient Greeks and the Romans cared and wrote about sexual morality within categories of good and bad, pure and defiled, and ideal and transgression. But the sexual ethical structures of Roman society were built on its concepts of status and gender; sexual modesty meant something different for men than it did for women, and for the well-born, than it did for the poor, and for the free citizen, than it did for the slave—for whom the concepts of honor, shame and sexual modesty were said to have no meaning at all. Slaves were not thought to have an interior ethical life because they could go no lower socially and were commonly used sexually; the free and well born who used them were thought to embody social honor and the fine sense of shame suited to their station regardless. Roman literature indicates the Romans were aware of these dualities.

Shame was a profoundly social concept that was, in ancient Rome, always mediated by gender and status. "It was not enough that a wife merely regulate her sexual behavior in the accepted ways; it was required that her virtue in this area be conspicuous." Men, on the other hand, were allowed sexual freedoms, such as live-in mistresses and sex with slaves. This permitted Roman society to find both a husband's control of a wife's sexual behavior a matter of intense importance and at the same time see his own sex with young slave boys as of little concern.

The central Christian prohibition against porneia "collided with the deeply entrenched patterns of Roman permissiveness" and exploitation. Harper writes that Christianity sought to establish equal sexual consideration for both men and women within the sanctity of marriage, and to protect all from exploitation whatever their circumstance. This was a transformation in the "deep logic" of sexual morality, a revolution in the rules of behavior, but also, a true transformation in the very image of the human being as free, with power and responsibility for one's own self.

Christian sexual ideology is inextricably interwoven with its larger concept of freewill. "In its original form, Christian freewill was a cosmological claim—an argument about the relationship between God's justice and the individual... [but] as Christianity became intermeshed with society, the discussion shifted in revealing ways to the actual psychology of volition and the material constraints on sexual action". The Greeks and Romans said a human being's deepest moralities depended upon their social position, which is given by fate and must, therefore, be simply accepted. Christianity preached freedom, and the power and responsibility that goes with it, no matter what a person's status or position in society.

As a result, Harper says

...the triumph of Christianity not only drove profound cultural change, it created a new relationship between sexual morality and society... The legacy of Christianity lies in the dissolution of an ancient system where social and political status, power, and inherited inequality with no hope to better one's self scripted the terms of sexual morality. ... There are risks in over-estimating the change in old patterns Christianity was able to begin bringing about; but there are risks, too, in underestimating Christianization as a watershed.

=== Early Christian views on gender ===
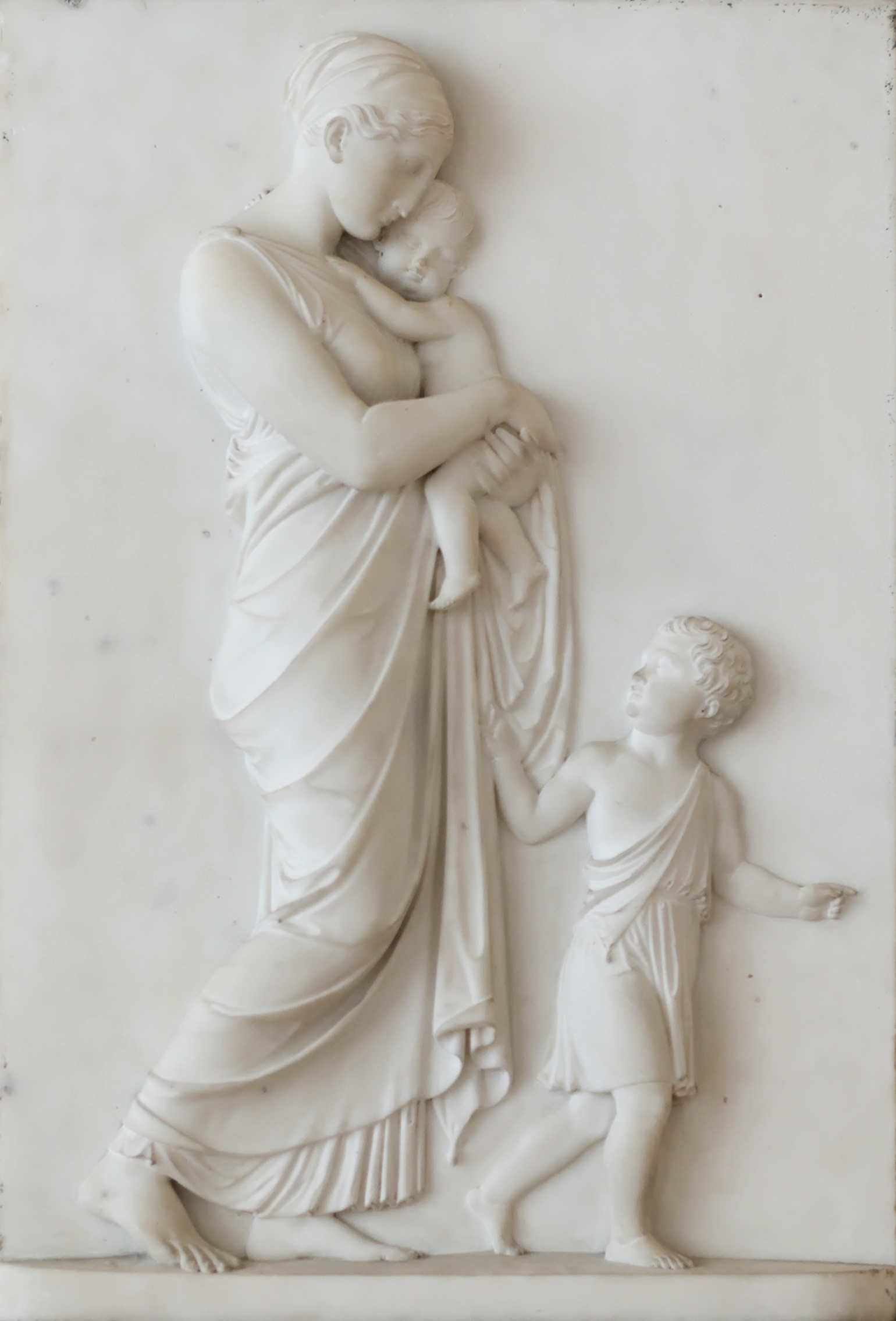
Christian Charity, 19th-century work by Bertel Thorvaldsen

Sociologist Linda L. Lindsey says "Belief in the spiritual equality of the genders (Galatians 3:28) and Jesus' inclusion of women in prominent roles, led the early New Testament church to recognize women's contributions to charity, evangelism and teaching." The women named as leaders in the Pauline epistles contributed directly to that endeavor by acting in roles like those of men. New Testament scholar Linda Belleville says "virtually every leadership role that names a man also names a woman. In fact there are more women named as leaders in the New Testament than men. Phoebe is a 'deacon' and a 'benefactor' (Romans 16:1–2). Mary, mother of John Mark, Lydia and Nympha are overseers of house churches (Acts 12:12; 16:15; Colossians 4:15). Euodia and Syntyche are among 'the overseers and deacons' at Philippi (Philippians 1:1; cf, 4:2–3). The only role lacking specific female names is that of 'elder – but there, male names are lacking as well." Professor of religious studies at Brown University, Ross Kraemer, argues that early Christianity offered women of the first centuries a new sense of worth.

Christianity offered a framework for influential women exercising new and different roles. Lieu affirms that women of note were attracted to Christianity as evidenced in the Acts of the Apostles where mention is made of Lydia, the seller of purple at Philippi, and of other noble women at Thessalonica, Berea and Athens ( 17.4, 12, 33–34). Lieu writes that, "In parts of the Empire, influential women were able to use religion to negotiate a role for themselves in society that existing conceptual frameworks did not legitimate". There is some evidence of a similar disruption of traditional women's roles in some of the mystery cults, such as Cybele, but there is no evidence this went beyond the internal practices of the religion itself. The mysteries created no alternative in larger society to the established patterns. There is no evidence of any effort in Second Temple Judaism to harmonize the roles or standing of women with that of men. Roman Empire was an age of awareness of the differences between male and female. Social roles were not taken for granted. They were debated, and this was often done with some misogyny. Paul uses a basic formula of reunification of opposites, (Galatians 3:28; 1 Corinthians 12:13; Colossians 3:11) to simply wipe away such social distinctions. In speaking of slave/free, male/female, Greek/Jew, circumcised/uncircumcised, and so on, he states that "all" are "one in Christ" or that "Christ is all". This became part of the message of the early church.

According to MacDonald, much of the vociferous pagan criticism aimed against the early church is evidence of this "female initiative" which contributed to the reasons Roman society saw Christianity as a threat. In Roman culture, widows were required to remarry within a few years of their husband's death, but Christian widows were not required to remarry and could freely choose to remain single, and celibate, with the church's support. Many widows and single women were choosing not to marry, and were encouraging other women to follow. Accusations that Christianity undermined the Roman family and male authority in the home were used to stir up opposition to Christianity and negatively influence public opinion. Pagan response to this female activity was negative and sometimes violent toward Christianity as a whole and played a part in the persecution of Christians in the Roman Empire.

A survey of the literature of the early period shows female converts as having one thing in common: that of being in danger. Women took real risks to spread the gospel. Ordinary women moved in and out of houses and shops and marketplaces, took the risk of speaking out and leading people, including children, outside the bounds of the "proper authorities". This is evident in the sanctions and labels their antagonists used against them. Power resided with the male authority figure, and he had the right to label any uncooperative female in his household as insane or possessed, to exile her from her home, and condemn her to prostitution. Kraemer theorizes that "Against such vehement opposition, the language of the ascetic forms of Christianity must have provided a strong set of validating mechanisms", attracting large numbers of women.

New Testament scholar Craig Blomberg and other complementarians assert three primary texts in the New Testament that are essential to understanding what is generally seen as the traditional view of women and women's roles: "1 Corinthians 14:34–35, where women are commanded to be silent in the church; 1 Timothy 2:11–15 where women (according to the TNIV) are not permitted to teach or have authority over a man; and 1 Corinthians 11:2–16 where the male and female relationship is defined in terms of kephalē commonly translated head."[69] Margaret MacDonald believes the dangerous circumstances surrounding reaction to the roles of women were likely the catalysts for the "shift in perspective concerning unmarried women from Paul's [early] days to the time of the Pastoral epistles", however, while 1 Timothy is considered one of the Pastoral Epistles, 1 Corinthians is not.

=== Jesus' interactions with women ===
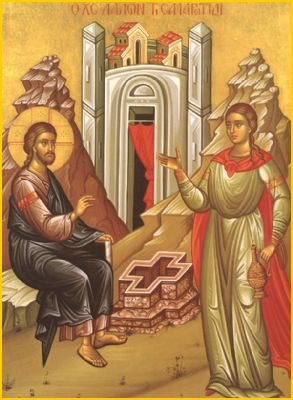
A Greek Orthodox icon depicting the Samaritan woman at the well meeting Jesus

The New Testament refers to a number of women in Jesus' inner circle. Jesus often spoke directly to women in public. The disciples were astonished to see Jesus talking with the Samaritan woman at the well of Sychar (John 4:7–26). He spoke freely with the woman taken in adultery (John 8:10–11), with the widow of Nain (Luke 7:12–13), the woman with the bleeding disorder (Luke 8:48; cf. Matt. 9:22; Mark 5:34), and a woman who called to him from a crowd (Luke 11:27–28). Similarly, Jesus addressed a woman bent over for eighteen years (Luke 13:12) and a group of women on the route to the cross (Luke 23:27–31). Jesus spoke in a thoughtful, caring manner. Each synoptic writer records Jesus addressing the woman with the bleeding disorder tenderly as "daughter" and he refers to the bent woman as a "daughter of Abraham" (Luke 13:16). Theologian Donald G. Bloesch infers that "Jesus called the Jewish women 'daughters of Abraham' (Luke 13:16), thereby according them a spiritual status equal to that of men."

Jesus held women personally responsible for their own behavior as seen in his dealings with the woman at the well (John 4:16–18), the woman taken in adultery (John 8:10–11), and the sinful woman who anointed his feet (Luke 7:44–50 and the other three gospels). Jesus dealt with each as having the personal freedom and enough self-determination to deal with their own repentance and forgiveness. There are several Gospel accounts of Jesus imparting important teachings to and about women: his public admiration for a poor widow who donated two copper coins to the Temple in Jerusalem, his friendship with Mary of Bethany and Martha, the sisters of Lazarus, and the presence of Mary Magdalene, his mother, and the other women as he was crucified. New Testament scholar Ben Witherington III says "Jesus broke with both biblical and rabbinic traditions that restricted women's roles in religious practices, and he rejected attempts to devalue the worth of a woman, or her word of witness."

=== Women in the New Testament ===
==== Mary, mother of Jesus ====
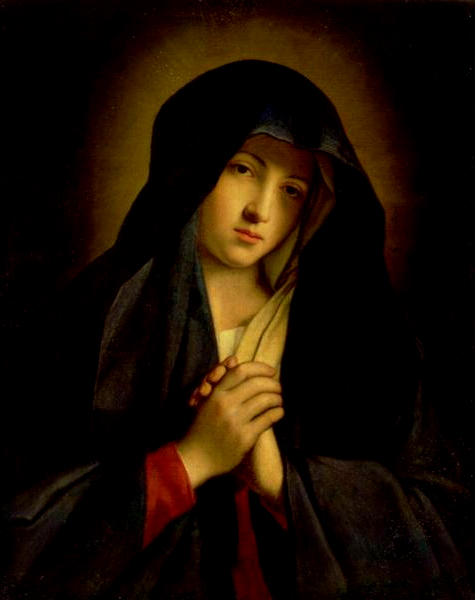
Il Sassoferrato, The Madonna in Prayer

Outside of the infancy narratives, Mary is mentioned infrequently after the beginning of Jesus' public ministry. The Gospels say Mary is the one "of whom Jesus was born" (Matthew 1:16) and that she is the "favored one" (Luke 1:28). Some scholars believe the infancy narratives were interpolations by the early church. Bart Ehrman explains that Jesus is never mentioned by name in the Talmud, but there is a subtle attack on the virgin birth that refers to the illegitimate son of a Roman soldier named "Panthera". (Ehrman says, "In Greek the word for virgin is parthenos").

Mary is not introduced in the Gospels in a way that would make her seem noteworthy or deserving of special honor. She is young, resides in an insignificant town, far from the centers of power, with no special social position or status, yet she is the one granted the highest of all statuses, demonstrating the supreme reversal. When she receives the announcement of Jesus' birth, she asks "How can this be?" Then, "...let it be" (1:38).

In the Gospel of Luke, Mary visits Elizabeth, her cousin, twice, and twice Elizabeth calls her blessed (Luke 1:42,45). Mary herself states all future generations will call her blessed (1:48). Mary "ponders" Simeon's warning that "a sword would pierce her soul" in Luke 2:34,35. She is troubled by Jesus staying behind in the Temple at Jerusalem at 12 and his assumption his parents would know where he was (Luke 2:49). Mary "ponders all these things in her heart."

In all three synoptic gospels, Mark, Matthew and Luke, Mary and Jesus' brothers are disowned by Jesus. The Matthew version has it as "Then one said unto him, Behold, thy mother and thy brethren stand without, desiring to speak with thee. But he answered and said unto him that told him, Who is my mother? and who are my brethren? And he stretched forth his hand toward his disciples, and said, Behold my mother and my brethren! For whosoever shall do the will of my Father which is in heaven, the same is my brother, and sister, and mother." In Luke the repudiation is even stronger, there Jesus says his disciples have to hate their mothers. "If any man come to me, and hate not his father, and mother, and wife, and children, and brethren, and sisters, yea, and his own life also, he cannot be my disciple."

The Gospel of John never identifies her by name, referring instead to "the mother of Jesus". Mary appears twice in John, once at the beginning of the Gospel, and once near its end. The first is the wedding feast at Cana where the wine runs out. Mary tells Jesus, and his response is "Woman, what have I to do with you? My hour has not yet come." In spite of this, Mary tells the servants, "Do whatever he says." Jesus orders 6 stone water jars filled with water, and then directs that it be taken to the steward who describes it as the "best" wine.

Jesus' mother appears again in John (19:25–27) at the crucifixion, where Jesus makes provision for the care of his mother in her senior years (John 19:25–27). Mary speaks not a word and the narrator does not describe her.

==== Jesus' sisters ====
According to the New Testament, Jesus had sisters. The name Mary has been suggested for one of them outside the Bible.

==== Junia ====
Paul wrote in Romans 16:7 "Greet Andronicus and Junia, my fellow Jews who have been in prison with me. They are outstanding among the apostles, and they were in Christ before I was." Bible translator Hayk Hovhannisyan says Junia was a woman and there is consensus supporting this view. He says that "Some scholars argue that Junia was really a man by the name of Junias... Whether this name is masculine or feminine depends on how the word was accented in Greek. ...scribes wrote Junia as feminine. Examination of ancient Greek and Latin literature confirms the masculine name Junias is nowhere attested, whereas the female name Junia...is found more than 250 times..." New Testament scholar Craig S. Keener says the early church understood Andronicus and Junia to be a husband and wife apostolic team.

==== Priscilla ====
In Romans 16:3–5 Paul refers to the married couple Priscilla and Aquila as his "fellow workers" saying they risked their lives for him. Paul worked and seemingly lived with them for a considerable time, and they followed him to Ephesus before he left on his next missionary journey. In Acts 18:25,26 Luke says Apollos, a "learned man", came to Ephesus and began speaking in the synagogue. When Priscilla and Aquilla heard him, they took him with them and "explained the way of God more accurately." Hayk Hovhannisyan says "either Priscilla was unaware of [Paul's doctrine that a woman shouldn't teach a man], which is virtually impossible; or she knew about it and decided to rebel—or the doctrine did not exist."

==== Mary of Bethany ====
In Luke 10:39, the author says Mary sat "at Jesus feet". The author "chooses terminology associated with rabbinic study (compare Acts 22:3), suggesting that Mary became Jesus' student."

==== Mary Magdalene ====
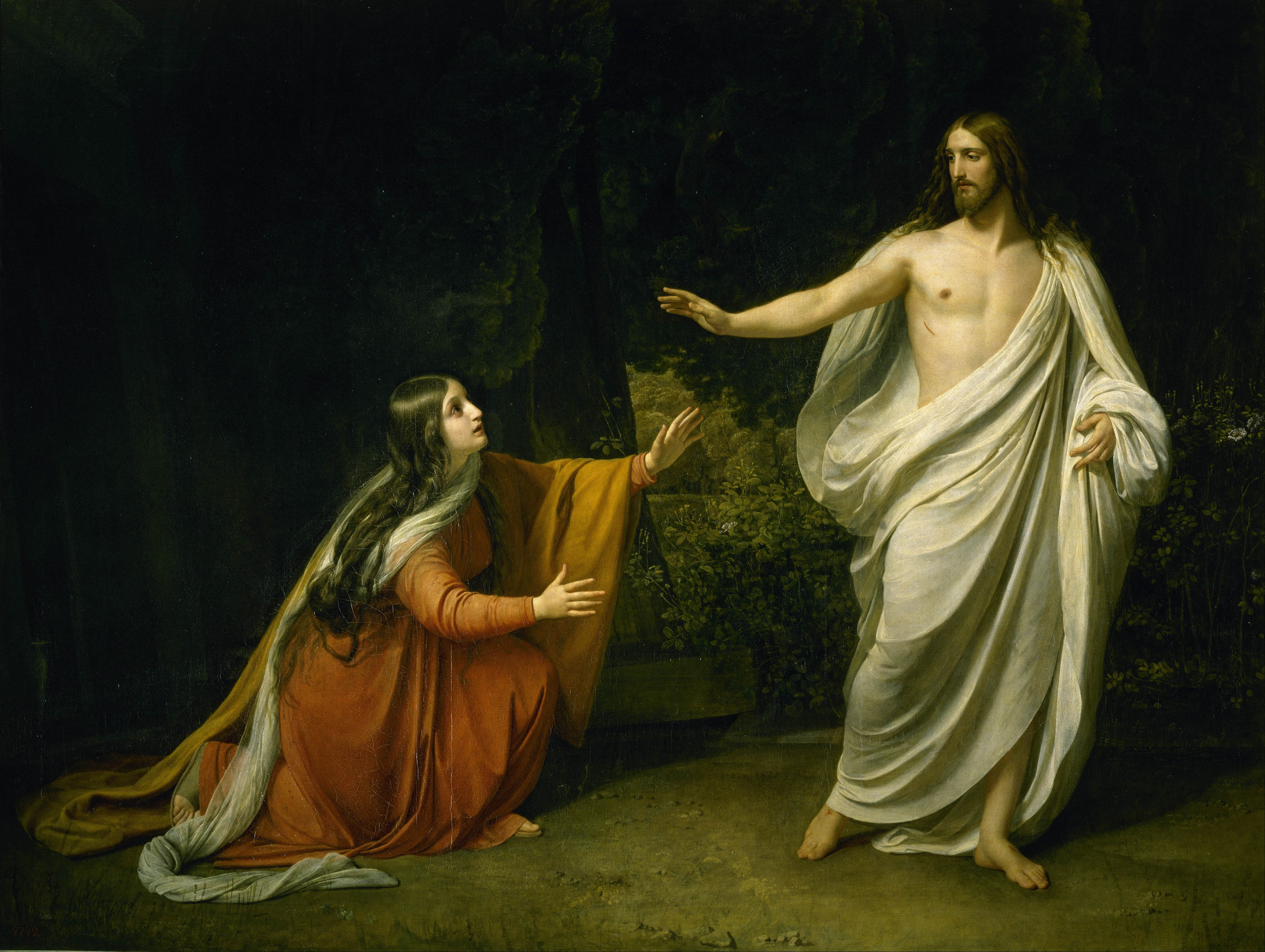
Appearance of Jesus Christ to Mary Magdalene (1835) by Alexander Andreyevich Ivanov

New Testament scholar Mary Ann Getty-Sullivan says Mary Magdalene, or Mary from the town of Magdala, is sometimes "erroneously identified as the sinner who anointed Jesus according to Luke's description in Luke 7:36–50. She is at times also confused with Mary of Bethany, the sister of Martha and Lazarus (John 12:1–8)", and is sometimes assumed to be the woman caught in adultery (John 7:53–8:11), though there is nothing in the text to indicate that. Luke qualifies her as "one who was healed" but otherwise little is known about her. There is nothing to directly indicate Mary Magdalene was a former prostitute, and some scholars believe she was a woman of means who helped support Jesus and his ministry.

In John 20:1–13, Mary Magdalene sees the risen Jesus alone and he tells her "Don't touch me, for I have not yet ascended to my father." New Testament scholar Ben Witherington III says John is the only evangelist with a "keen interest" in portraying women in Jesus' story, yet, the "only Easter event narrated by all four evangelists concerns the visit of the women to the tomb of Jesus." Mary Magdalene and the other women go to anoint Jesus' body at the tomb, but find the body gone. Mary Magdalene is inconsolable, but she turns and Jesus speaks to her. He calls her by name and she recognizes him. Witherington adds, "There are certain parallels between the story of the appearance to Mary and John 20:24–31 (when Jesus appears to Thomas) [however] Mary is given an apostolic task (to go tell the men) and Thomas is not... There is little doubt the Fourth evangelist wishes to portray Mary Magdalene as important, perhaps equally important for Jesus' fledgling community as Mother Mary herself."

The Roman writer Celsus' On The True Doctrine, circa 175, is the earliest known comprehensive criticism of Christianity and survives exclusively in quotations from it in Contra Celsum, a refutation written in 248 by Origen of Alexandria. Margaret MacDonald says Celsus' study of Christian scripture led him to focus on Mary Magdalene as the witness to the resurrection, as someone deluded by the "sorcery" by which Jesus did miracles, and as someone who then becomes one of Jesus' primary "instigators" and "perpetrators". MacDonald explains that, "In Celsus' work, Mary Magdalene's role in the resurrection story denigrates its credibility... From beginning to end, [Celsus says] the story of Jesus' life has been shaped by the 'fanciful imaginings' of women" thus lending enemy attestation to the importance of women in the early church and of Mary Magdalene herself.

MacDonald sees this negative view of Mary as reflecting a challenge taking place within the church of the second century. This was a challenge to Mary's role as a woman disciple and to leadership roles for women in general. "The challenge to Mary's position has been evaluated as an indication of tensions between the existing fact of women's leadership in Christian communities and traditional Greco-Roman views about gender roles." MacDonald adds that "Several apocryphal and gnostic texts provide evidence of such a controversy."

==== Herodias and her daughter ====
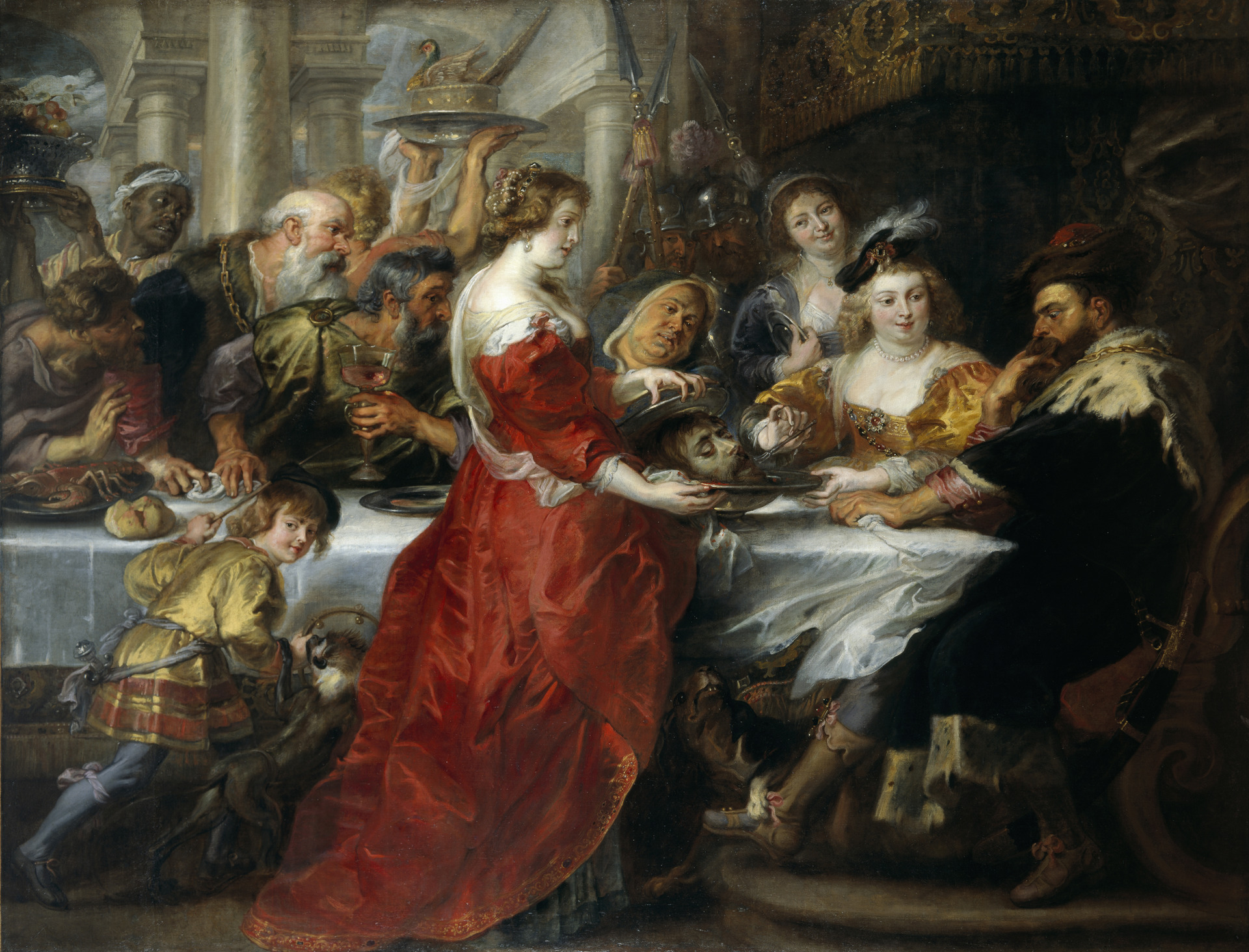
Feast of Herod, Peter Paul Rubens. 17th century

In the Gospels of Matthew and Mark, these women are involved with the execution of John the Baptist. Herodias wanted John dead, because he had called her second marriage unlawful, but her husband king Herod prevented this. On Herod's birthday, Herodias' daughter danced for him, and he was so pleased that he took an oath, in front of witnesses, that he would give her what she wanted. Her mother instructed her to ask for the head of John the Baptist on a plate, and Herod sadly agreed. The imprisoned John was beheaded, the head given to the daughter, and she gave it to her mother.

Herodias' daughter is unnamed in the gospels, but has outside the Bible been referred to as Salome.

==== Sapphira ====
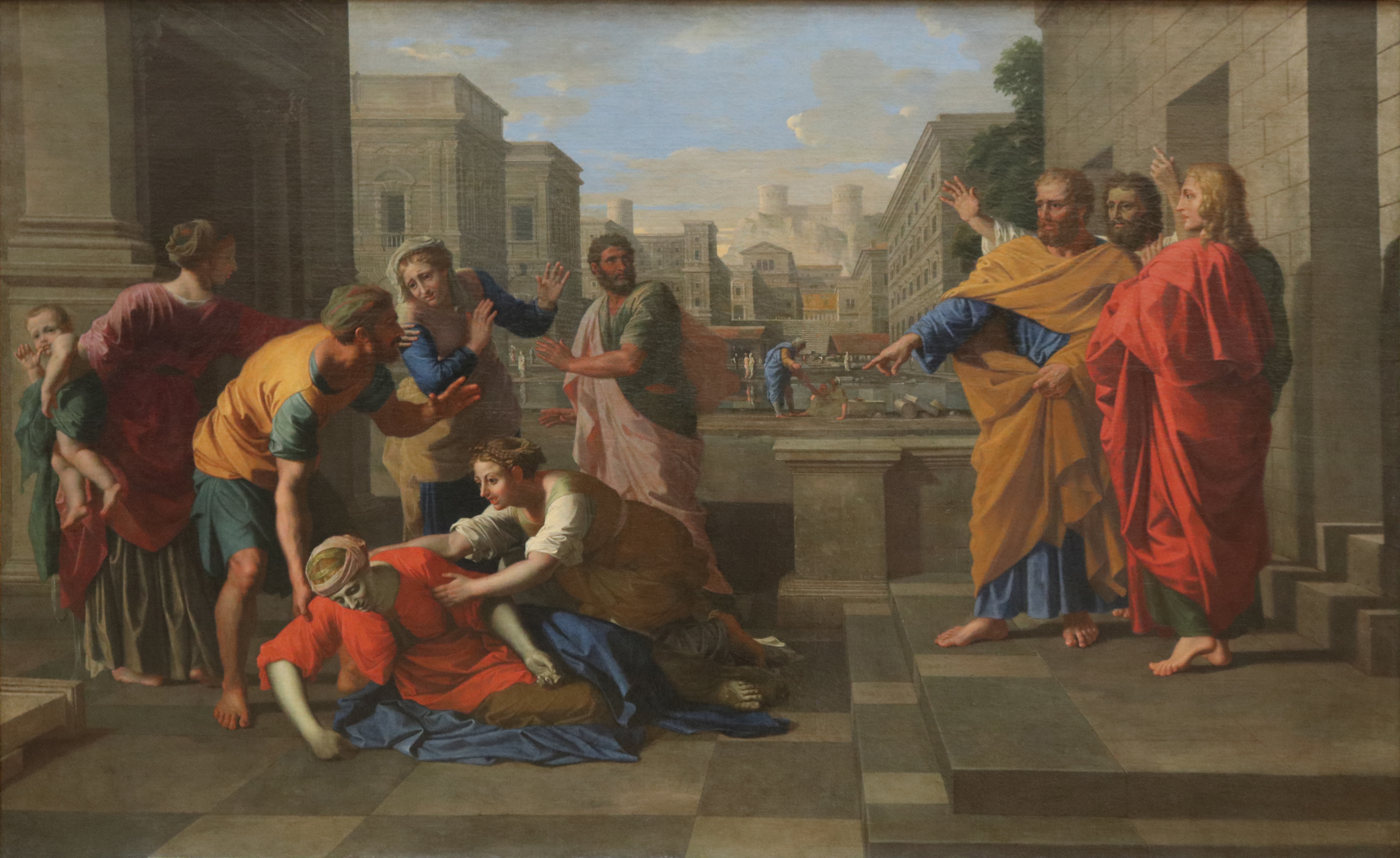
Nicolas Poussin, The Death of Sapphira

Ananias and his wife Sapphira were, according to the Acts of the Apostles chapter 5, members of the early Christian church in Jerusalem. The account records their sudden deaths after lying about money.

Acts chapter 4:32 closes by stating that the first followers of Jesus did not consider their possessions to be their own but rather held in common, in order to use what they had on behalf of those in want. As told at the beginning of Acts chapter 5 Ananias and Sapphira sold their land but secretly withheld a portion of the proceeds. Ananias presented his donation to Peter. Peter replied, "Why is it that Satan has so filled your heart that you have lied to the Holy Spirit?" Peter pointed out that Ananias was in control of the money and could give or keep it as he saw fit, but had withheld a portion of it. Peter stated that Ananias had lied not to men, but to God. Ananias died on the spot and was carried out. Three hours after Ananias' death his wife arrived, unaware of what had happened. Peter asked her the price of the land that she and Ananias had sold, and Sapphira stated the same untruthful price that Ananias had given. She also fell dead.

Theologian James Dunn describes this story as "one of the most unnerving episodes in the whole of the New Testament."

=== The Pauline epistles and women ===
Paul the Apostle was the first writer to give ecclesiastical directives about the role of women in the church. Some of these are now heavily disputed. There are also arguments that some of the writings attributed to Paul are pseudepigraphal post-Pauline interpolations. Scholars agree certain texts attributed to Paul and the Pauline epistles have provided much support for the view of the role of women as subservient. Others have claimed culture has imposed a particular translation upon his texts that Paul did not actually support.

==== 1 Corinthians 14:34–35 ====
These verses read in the Authorized Version "Let your women keep silence in the churches: for it is not permitted unto them to speak; but they are commanded to be under obedience as also saith the law. And if they will learn any thing, let them ask their husbands at home: for it is a shame for women to speak in the church."

==== 1 Timothy 2:11–15 ====
These verses in the King James version read as follows "Let the woman learn in silence with all subjection. But I suffer not a woman to teach, nor to usurp authority over the man, but to be in silence. For Adam was first formed, then Eve. And Adam was not deceived, but the woman being deceived was in the transgression. Notwithstanding she shall be saved in childbearing, if they continue in faith and charity and holiness with sobriety."

==== 1 Timothy 5:3–16 ====
1 Timothy 5:3–16 states in the Authorized Version "Honour widows that are widows indeed. But if any widow have children or nephews, let them learn first to shew piety at home, and to requite their parents: for that is good and acceptable before God. Now she that is a widow indeed, and desolate, trusteth in God, and continueth in supplications and prayers night and day. But she that liveth in pleasure is dead while she liveth. And these things give in charge, that they may be blameless. But if any provide not for his own, and specially for those of his own house, he hath denied the faith, and is worse than an infidel. Let not a widow be taken into the number under threescore years old, having been the wife of one man, well reported of for good works; if she have brought up children, if she have lodged strangers, if she have washed the saints' feet, if she have relieved the afflicted, if she have diligently followed every good work. But the younger widows refuse: for when they have begun to wax wanton against Christ, they will marry; having damnation, because they have cast off their first faith. And withal they learn to be idle, wandering about from house to house; and not only idle, but tattlers also and busybodies, speaking things which they ought not. I will therefore that the younger women marry, bear children, guide the house, give none occasion to the adversary to speak reproachfully. For some are already turned aside after Satan. If any man or woman that believeth have widows, let them relieve them, and let not the church be charged; that it may relieve them that are widows indeed."

==== 1 Corinthians 11:2–16 ====
In the King James translation these verses read as "Now I praise you, brethren, that ye remember me in all things, and keep the ordinances, as I delivered them to you. But I would have you know, that the head of every man is Christ; and the head of the woman is the man; and the head of Christ is God. Every man praying or prophesying, having his head covered, dishonoureth his head. But every woman that prayeth or prophesieth with her head uncovered dishonoureth her head: for that is even all one as if she were shaven. For if the woman be not covered, let her also be shorn: but if it be a shame for a woman to be shorn or shaven, let her be covered. For a man indeed ought not to cover his head, forasmuch as he is the image and glory of God: but the woman is the glory of the man. For the man is not of the woman: but the woman of the man. Neither was the man created for the woman; but the woman for the man. For this cause ought the woman to have power on her head because of the angels. Nevertheless, neither is the man without the woman, neither the woman without the man, in the Lord. For as the woman is of the man, even so is the man also by the woman; but all things of God. Judge in yourselves: is it comely that a woman pray unto God uncovered? Doth not even nature itself teach you, that, if a man have long hair, it is a shame unto him? But if a woman have long hair, it is a glory to her: for her hair is given her for a covering. But if any man seem to be contentious, we have no such custom, neither the churches of God."

=== 1 Peter on women ===
In 1 Peter 3 wives are exhorted to submit to their husbands "so they may be won over." (Wives, in the same way, accept the authority of your husbands, so that, even if some of them do not obey the word, they may be won over without a word by their wives' conduct).

=== Contemporary views ===
There is no contemporary consensus on the New Testament view of women. Psychologist James R. Beck points out that "Evangelical Christians have not yet settled the exegetical and theological issues." Liberal Christianity represented by the development of historical criticism was not united in its view of women either: suffragist Elizabeth Cady Stanton tells of the committee that formed The Woman's Bible in 1895. Twenty six women purchased two Bibles and went through them, cutting out every text that concerned women, pasted them into a book, and wrote commentaries underneath. Its purpose was to challenge Liberal theology of the time that supported the orthodox position that woman should be subservient to man. The book attracted a great deal of controversy and antagonism. Contemporary Christianity is still divided between those who support equality of all types for women in the church, those who support spiritual equality with the compartmentalization of roles, and those who support a more modern equivalent of patriarchy.

== In art and culture ==
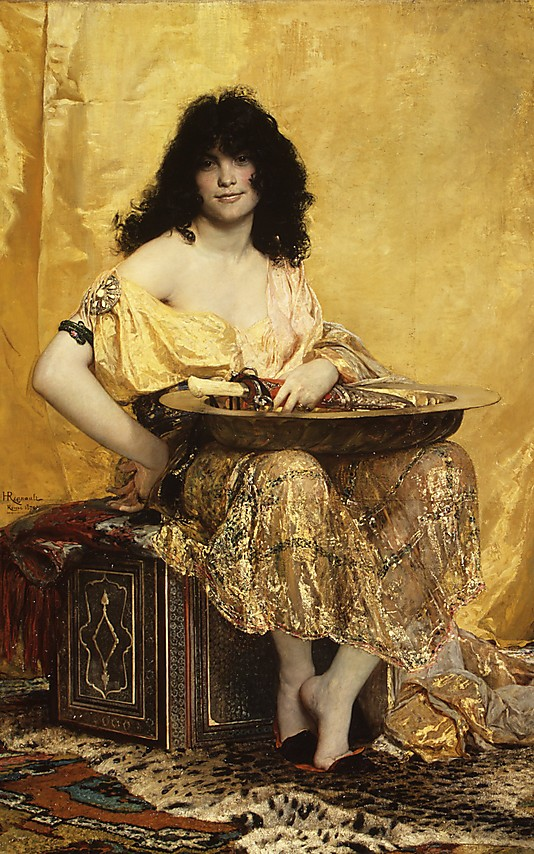
Salomé, by Henri Regnault (1870)

There are hundreds of examples of women from the Bible as characters in painting, sculpture, opera and film. Historically, artistic renderings tend to reflect the changing views on women from within society more than the biblical account that mentions them.

Eve is a common subject. Art historian Mati Meyer says society's views of women are observable in the differing renderings of Eve in art over the centuries. Meyer explains: "Genesis 2–3 recounts the creation of man and the origins of evil and death; Eve, the temptress who disobeys God's commandment, is probably the most widely discussed and portrayed figure in art." According to Mati Meyer, Eve is historically portrayed in a favorable light up through the Early Middle Ages (800s CE), but by the Late Middle Ages (1400s) artistic interpretation of Eve becomes heavily misogynistic. Meyer sees this change as influenced by the writings of the 4th century theologian Augustine of Hippo, "who sees Eve's sexuality as destructive to male rationality". By the seventeenth century, the Fall of man as a male-female struggle emerges, and in the eighteenth century, the perception of Eve is influenced by John Miltons Paradise Lost where Adam's free will is emphasized along with Eve's beauty. Thereafter a secular view of Eve emerges "through her transformation into a femme fatale—a compound of beauty, seductiveness and independence set to destroy the man."

Courageous and victorious women, such as Jael, Esther and the deuterocanonical Judith, were popular "moral" figures in the Middle Ages. The Renaissance, which preferred the sensuous female nude up through the eighteenth century, and the "femme fatale", such as Delilah, from the nineteenth century onward, all demonstrate how the Bible and art both shape and reflect views of women.

The story of the biblical Queen Athaliah was the inspiration for one of the greatest tragedies of French dramatist Jean Racine, Athalie.

The opera Salome by Richard Strauss was highly controversial when first composed due to its combination of biblical theme, eroticism and murder. The story of her dance before Herod with the head of John the Baptist on a silver platter led medieval Christian artists to depict her as the personification of the lascivious woman, a temptress who lures men away from salvation. Strauss' opera is based upon Oscar Wilde's play Salome which depicts her in the role of femme fatale. This biblical story has long been a favorite of painters as well. Notable representations of Salome include Masolino da Panicale, Filippo Lippi, Benozzo Gozzoli, Leonardo da Vinci followers Andrea Solario and Bernardino Luini, Lucas Cranach the Elder, Titian, Caravaggio, Guido Reni, Fabritius, Henri Regnault, Georges Rochegrosse, Gustave Moreau, Lovis Corinth and Federico Beltran-Masses.

Other examples of Biblical women in operas include the story of Samson and Delilah by Camille Saint-Saëns; it is one of the pieces that defines French opera. Ruth is an opera with libretto in English composed by Lennox Berkeley that premiered in London in 1956.

George Frideric Handel composed a series of dramatic oratorios in English on Biblical themes. Among those with major roles for notable women from the Bible are Esther, composed for private performance in a nobleman's home in 1718, revised into a full oratorio in 1732, Deborah, first performed at the King's Theatre in London on 17 March 1733, Athalia, first performed on 10 July 1733 at the Sheldonian Theatre in Oxford, Samson, premiere performance at Covent Garden theatre in London on 18 February 1743, and Jephtha, premiered at Covent Garden on 26 February 1752.

== See also ==
- Christian feminism
- Feminist theology
- Gender and Judaism
- Heresy of Peor
- Jewish feminism
- List of women in the Bible
- Role of Christianity in civilization
- The Three Marys
- Women as theological figures
- Women in the Quran

== Bibliography ==
- Cloke, Gillian (1995). This Female Man of God: Women and Spiritual Power in the Patristic Age, 350–450 AD. Routledge. ISBN 978-0-415-09469-6.
- Harper, Kyle (2011). Slavery in the Late Roman World, AD 275–425. Cambridge University Press. doi:10.1017/CBO9780511973451. ISBN 978-0-521-19861-5.
- Harper, Kyle (2013). From Shame to Sin: The Christian Transformation of Sexual Morality in Late Antiquity. Cambridge, MA: Harvard University Press. ISBN 978-0-674-07277-0.
- Kraemer, Ross S. (1980). "The Conversion of Women to Ascetic Forms of Christianity". Signs. 6 (2): 298–307. doi:10.1086/493798. JSTOR 3173928. S2CID 143202380.
- Lieu, Judith M. (1999). "The'attraction of women'in/to early Judaism and Christianity: gender and the politics of conversion". Journal for the Study of the New Testament. 21 (72): 5–22. doi:10.1177/0142064X9902107202. S2CID 144475695.
- MacDonald, Margaret Y. (1996). Early Christian Women and Pagan Opinion The power of the hysterical woman. NY: Cambridge University Press. ISBN 0-521-56174-4.
- MacDonald, Margaret Y (2003). "Was Celsus right? The role of women in the expansion of early Christianity." Early Christian families in context: An interdisciplinary dialogue. Wm. B. Eerdmans. pp. 157–84. ISBN 0-8028-3986-X.
- Meeks, Wayne A. (2003). The First Urban Christians (second ed.). Yale University. ISBN 978-0-300-09861-7.
- McLynn, Neil B. (1994). Ambrose of Milan: Church and Court in a Christian Capital. Berkeley: University of California Press. ISBN 978-0-520-08461-2.
- Meeks, Wayne A. (April 1998). "Christians on Love". The Great Appeal. PBS.
- Milnor, Kristina (2011). "Women in Roman Society". In Peachin, Michael (ed.). The Oxford Handbook of Social Relations in the Roman World. doi:10.1093/oxfordhb/9780195188004.013.0029. ISBN 978-0-19-518800-4.
