= Woman of Shunem =

Character in the Hebrew Bible

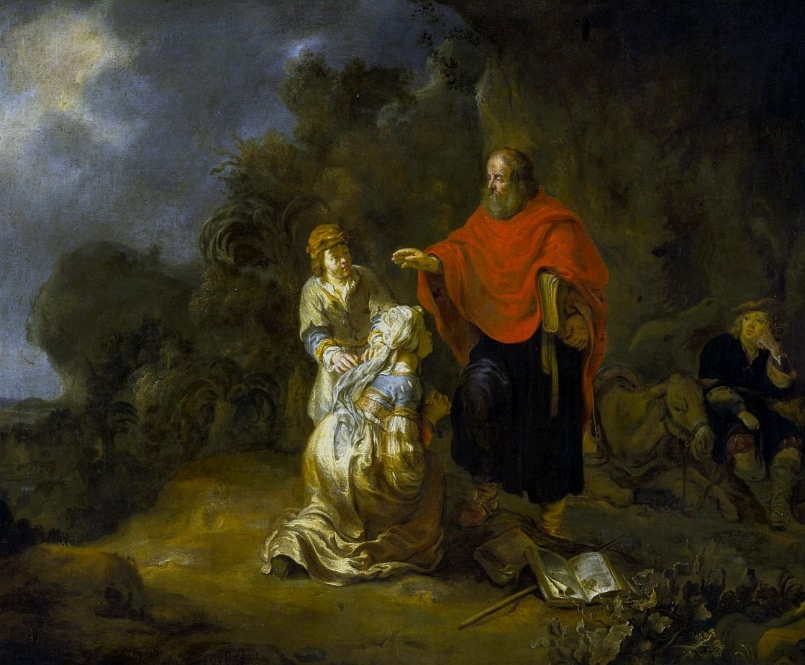
Gerbrand van den Eeckhout, Elisha and the Shunammite woman, 1649.

The woman of Shunem (or Shunammite woman) is a character in the Hebrew Bible. 2 Kings 4:8 describes her as a "great woman" (KJV) in the town of Shunem. Her name is not recorded in the biblical text.

== Hospitality ==
According to 2 Kings 4, she showed hospitality to the prophet Elisha, constructing a room where he could stay whenever he was in the town. She is childless, but Elisha prophesies that she will have a son. A year later she gives birth to a son.

== Raising of her son ==
2 Kings 4:18–37 relates how, when her son had grown up, he became sick and died. She goes to Elisha for help, and he brings her son back to life.

== Land restored ==
The woman of Shunem appears again in 2 Kings 8. At Elisha's advice, she has spent seven years in Philistia to avoid a famine, and has come back to find she no longer has possession of her house and land. She appeals to the king (Jehoram), and her property is restored to her.

== Evaluation ==
Abraham Kuyper views the woman of Shunem as a typical example of pious people in Israel having love and respect for the prophets. Kuyper suggests that the narrative indicates her "independence and readiness". Carol Meyers notes that "unlike virtually all women in biblical narratives, she is not presented as the 'wife' of someone". Claudia Camp says that the woman is "both independent and maternal, powerful and pious." The proposal to build a room for Elisha originates with the woman and is supported by her husband (2 Kings 4:9–10).

== In popular culture ==
The tv-series "The Testaments" features a character named "Shunammite", played by the actress Rowan Blanchard.

== See also ==
- Abishag
- Rahab
