= Claudia Camp =

American biblical scholar

Claudia V. Camp is an American biblical scholar. She is John F. Weatherly Professor of Religion at Texas Christian University. Camp's scholarship emphasizes feminists interpretation and identity formation in the Hebrew Bible and Second Temple period. Her recent scholarship has emphasized the metaphors of the Strange Woman and Lady Wisdom in the Book of Proverbs and the book of Ben Sira.

Camp has degrees from Duke University and Harvard Divinity School.

== Bibliography ==
- 2011 Historiography and Identity: (Re)formulation in Second Temple Historiographical Literature. T&T Clark.
- 2000 Wise, Strange and Holy: The Strange Woman and the Making of the Bible. JSOTSup 320. Sheffield: Sheffield Academic Press.
- 1987 Wisdom and the Feminine in the Book of Proverbs. LHBOTS. Sheffield: Sheffield Academic Press.
