= Absalom =

Third son of the Israelite king David

- Prince of Israel
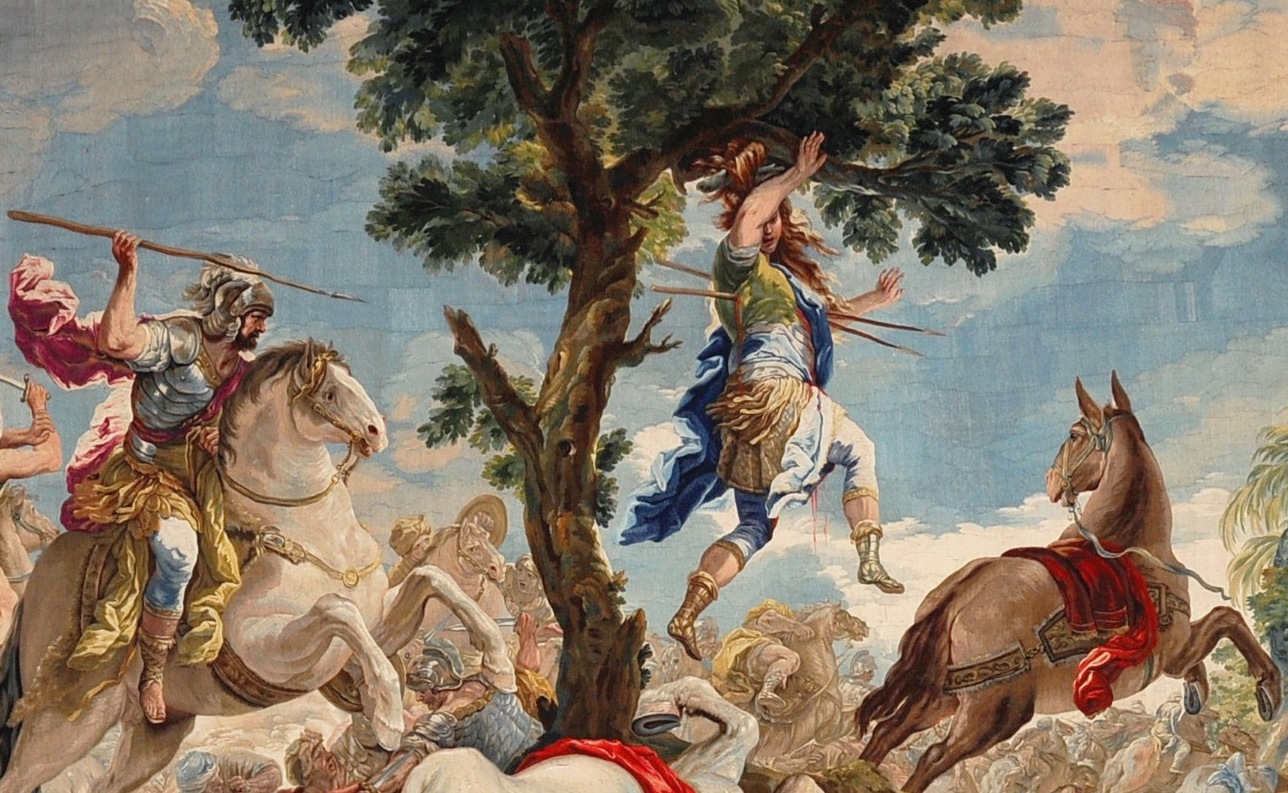
- Death of Absalom (1762) by Corrado Giaquinto
- Born: Hebron, Kingdom of Israel
- Died: c. 1000 BCE; Ephraim, Kingdom of Israel
- Issue: 4 avouched children: 3 unnamed sons; 1 daughter named Tamar
- Dynasty: House of David
- Father: David ben Yishai
- Mother: Maacah bat Talmai
- Religion: Yahwism

Absalom (Hebrew: אַבְשָׁלוֹם, romanized: ʾAḇšālōm, lit. 'Father of Peace'), according to the Hebrew Bible, was an Israelite prince. Born to David and Maacah, who was from Geshur, he was the only full sibling of Tamar. He is described in the Hebrew Bible as being exceptionally beautiful, as is his sister. In the narrative of 2 Samuel 13, his sister Tamar takes refuge at his house after she is raped by their paternal half-brother Amnon (born to David and Ahinoam, who was from Jezreel); David is angered by the incident, but at first does nothing, as Amnon is his heir apparent. Infuriated by the rape and David's inaction, Absalom later kills Amnon and subsequently flees to Geshur, which is ruled by his and Tamar's maternal grandfather Talmai.

Following three years in exile, he returns to Israel and rallies popular support against the House of David. A war ensues when Absalom's rebels mobilize at Hebron and begin fighting David's army in an attempt to overthrow him, but their revolt ends in failure when Absalom is killed by David's nephew and army commander Joab during the Battle of the Wood of Ephraim. In the aftermath of his death, Absalom's sister is described as being left "a desolate woman in her brother's house" and the sole guardian of his orphaned daughter, who is also named Tamar.

== Biblical narrative ==
=== Background ===
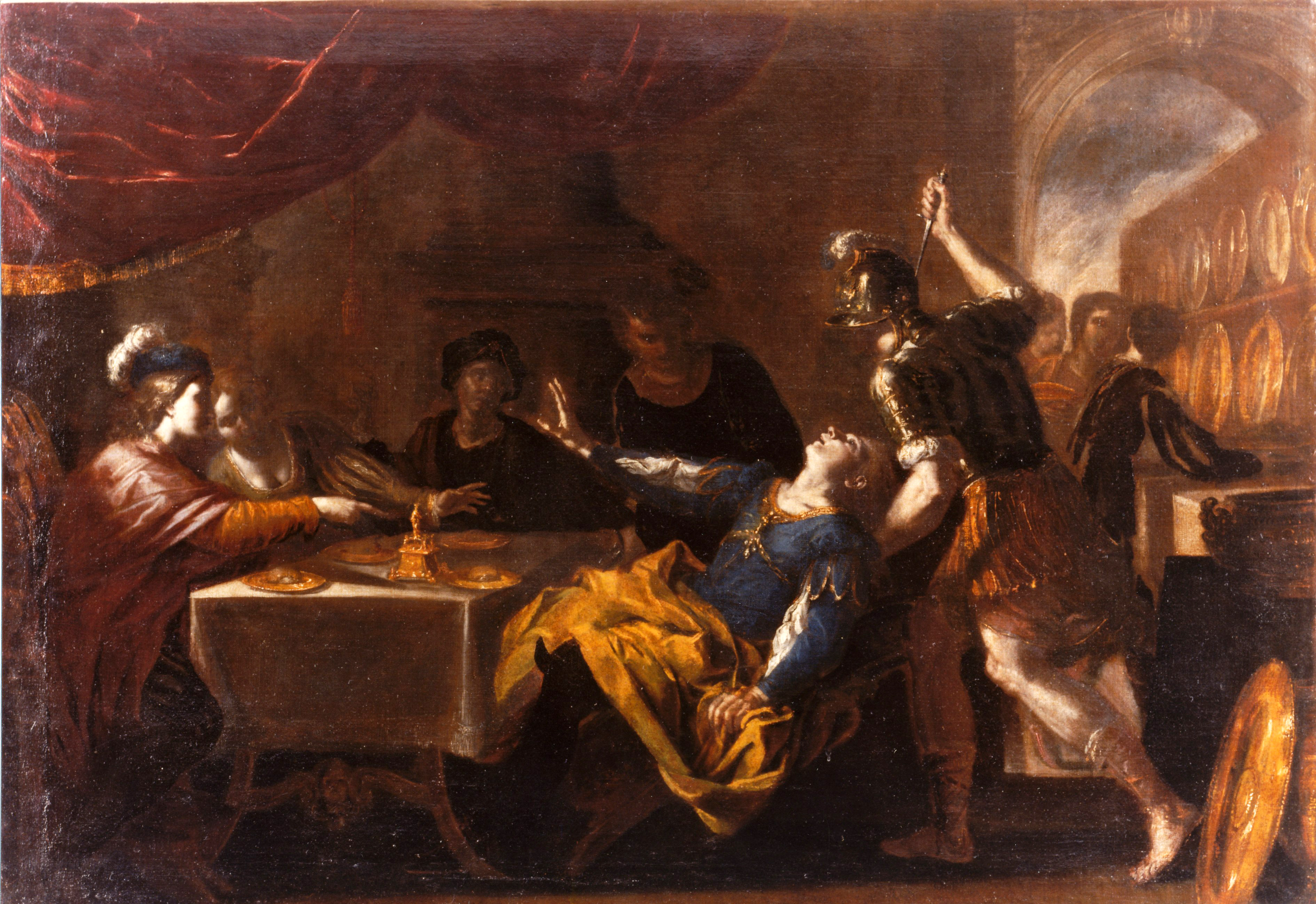
The Banquet of Absalom attributed to Niccolò de Simone around 1650

Absalom, David's third son, by Maacah, was born in Hebron. Absalom was renowned for his beauty and long hair. David had three sons and one daughter, Tamar, who is described as a beautiful woman. From the language of 2 Samuel 18:18, Absalom states, "I have no son to keep my name in remembrance". It may be that his sons died before his statement, or, as Matthew Henry suggests, Absalom's three sons may have been born after his statement.

Aside from his daughter Tamar, Absalom had another daughter or granddaughter, Maacah, who later became the favorite wife of Rehoboam. (Note: A footnote in the New King James Version reads "Literally daughter, but in the broader sense of granddaughter"2 Chron 11:20) Maacah was the mother of Abijah of Judah and the grandmother of Asa of Judah. She served as queen mother for Asa until he deposed her for idolatry.

=== Murder of Amnon ===
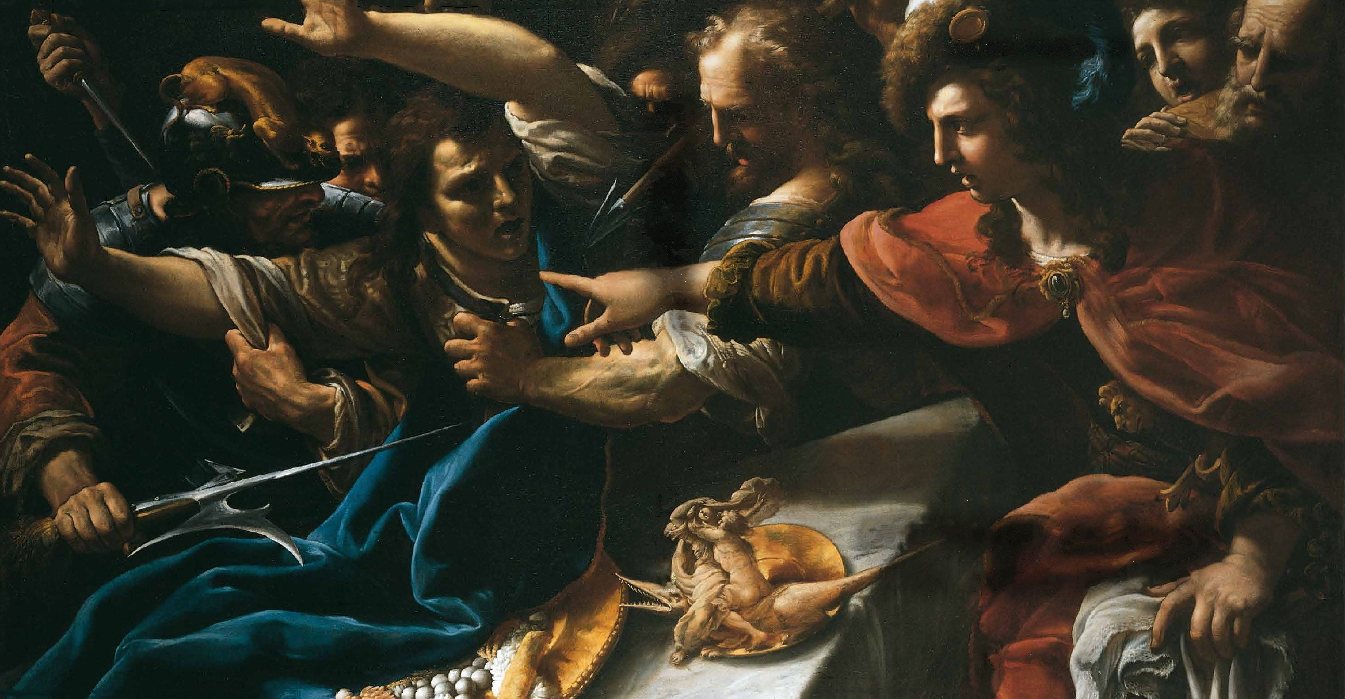
The Feast of Absalom, Niccolò Tornioli, 17th century

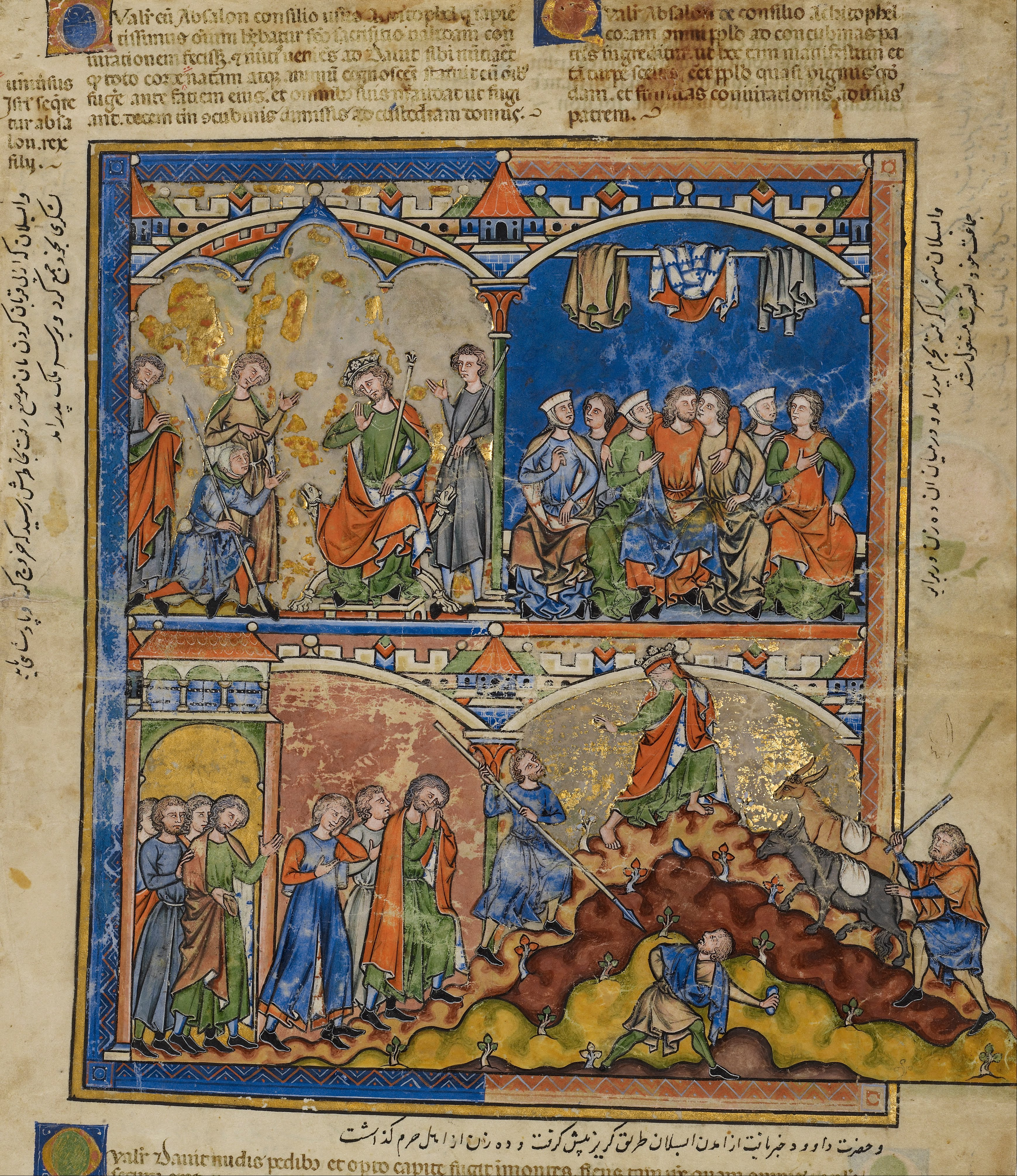
Leaf from the Morgan Picture Bible, "Scenes from the Life of David"

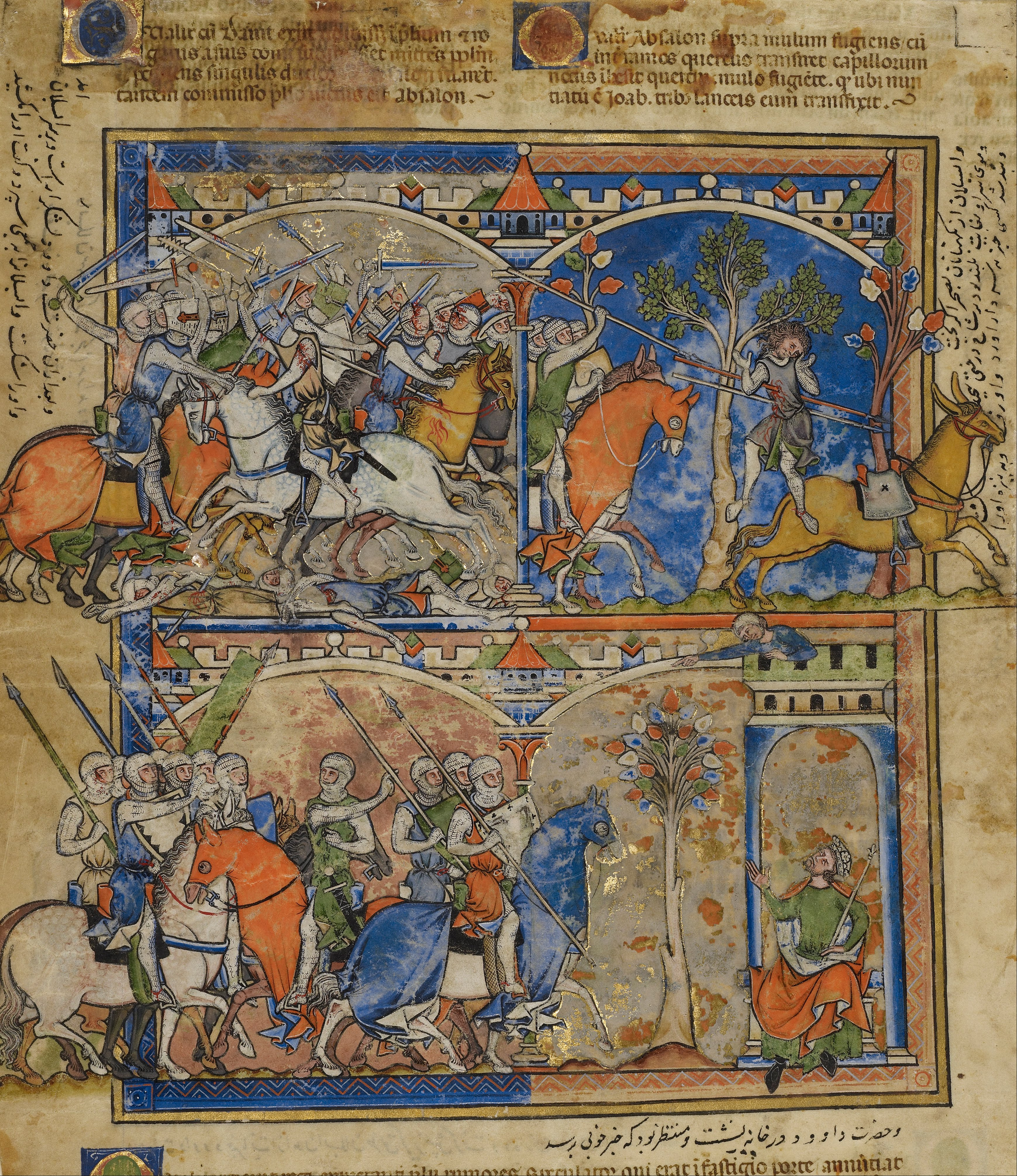
Leaf from the Morgan Picture Bible, "Scenes from the Life of Absalom", c. 1250

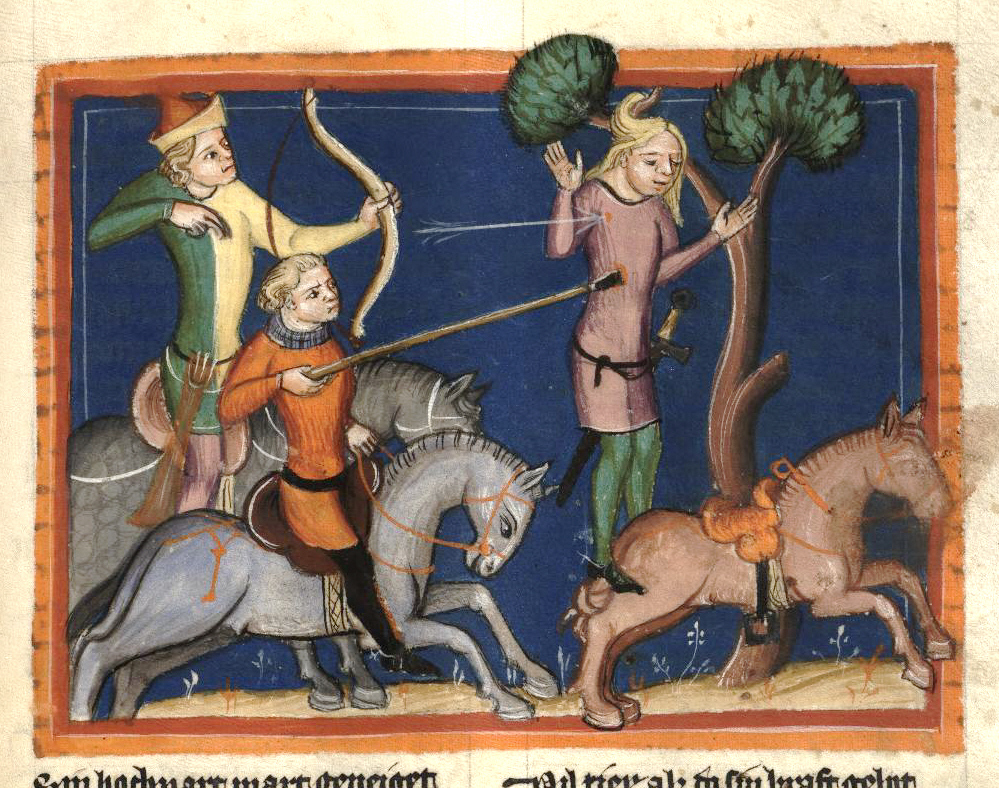
The death of Absalom, hanging from a tree by his hair (14th-century German miniature)

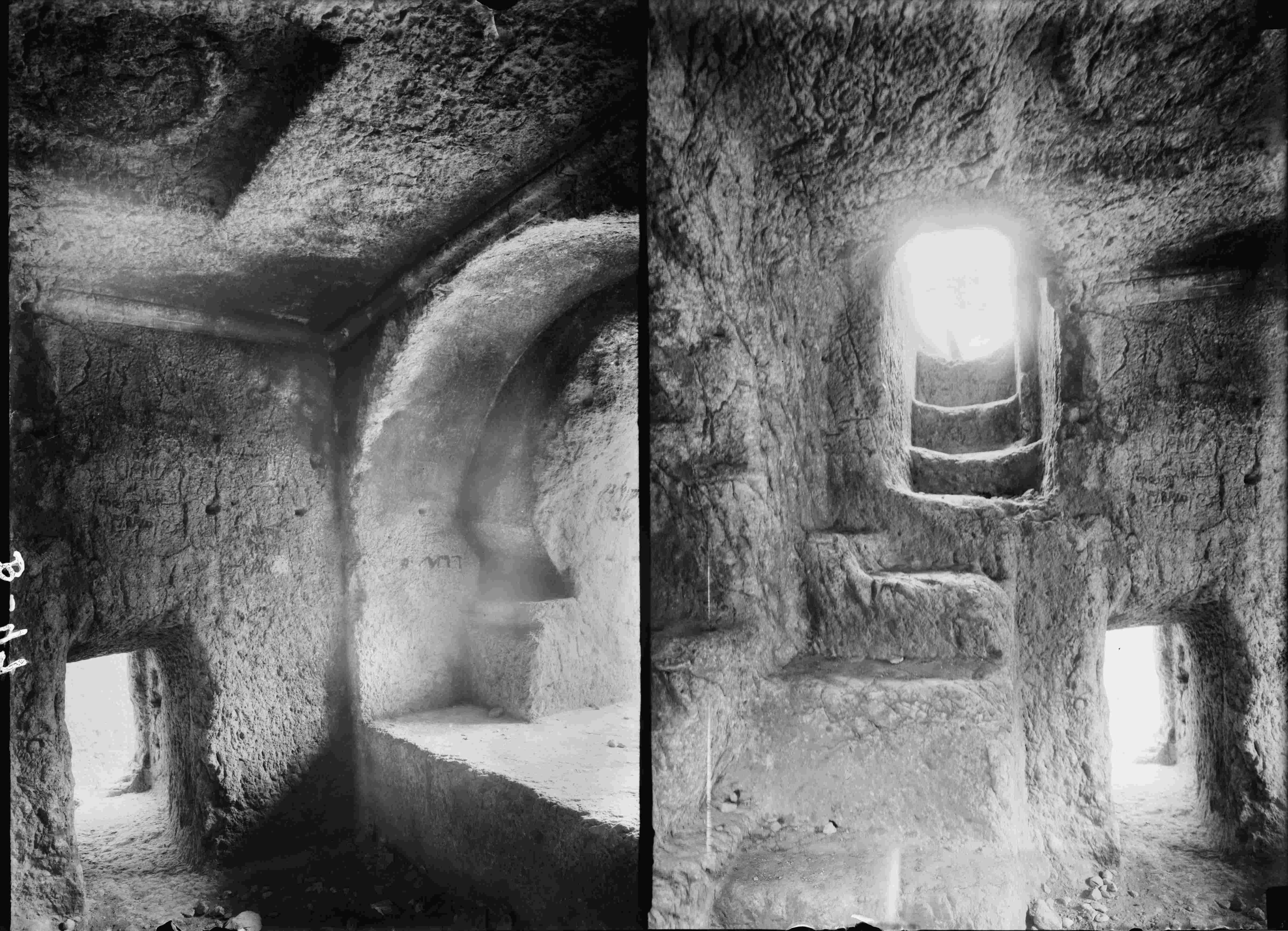
Two views of the burial chamber inside the so-called Tomb of Absalom in the Valley of Jehoshaphat, Jerusalem, which has no connection to biblical Absalom.

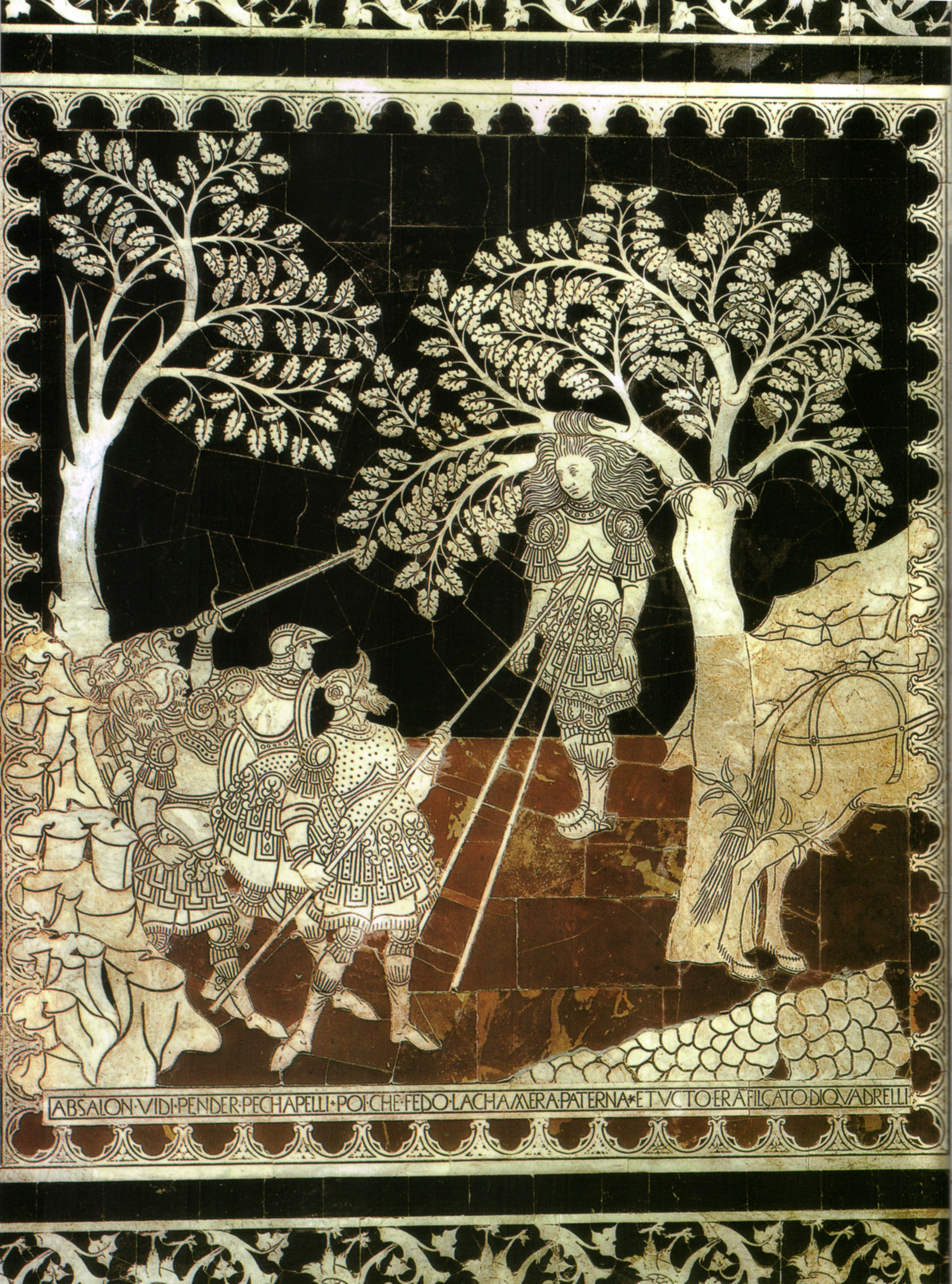
The Death of Absalom (circa 1447), Pietro di Tommaso del Minella (1391–1458), - tiled floor, south transept of Siena Cathedral

Absalom also had a sister named Tamar, who was raped by her half-brother Amnon, David's eldest son. Absalom waited two years after the rape for vengeance, sending his servants to murder a drunken Amnon at a feast to which Absalom had invited all of King David's sons.

After this murder, Absalom fled to his maternal grandfather Talmai, the king of Geshur. Not until three years later was Absalom fully reinstated in David's favour and finally returned to Jerusalem.

=== The revolt at Hebron ===
In Jerusalem, Absalom built support for himself by speaking to those who came to King David for justice, saying, "See, your claims are good and right; but there is no one deputed by the king to hear you", perhaps reflecting flaws in the judicial system of the united monarchy. "If only I were the judge of the land! Then all who had a suit or cause might come to me, and I would give them justice." He made gestures of flattery by kissing those who bowed before him instead of accepting supplication. He "stole the hearts of the people of Israel".

After four years, he declared himself king, raised a revolt at Hebron, the former capital, and publicly raped his father's ten concubines. It is said that this was God punishing David for his sin with Bathsheba tenfold. All Israel and Judah flocked to him, leaving David to be attended only by the Cherethites and Pelethites and his former bodyguard, which had followed him from Gath. The priests Zadok and Abiathar remained in Jerusalem, and their sons Jonathan and Ahimaaz served as David's spies. Absalom reached the capital and consulted with the renowned Ahitophel (sometimes spelled Achitophel). It is also speculated that Ahitophel could have joined Absalom's cause as David had previously committed adultery with Ahitophel's granddaughter, Bathsheba.

David took refuge from Absalom's forces beyond the Jordan River. However, he took the precaution of instructing a servant, Hushai, to infiltrate Absalom's court and subvert it. Once in place, Hushai convinced Absalom to ignore Ahitophel's advice to attack his father while he was on the run, and instead to prepare his forces for a major attack. This gave David critical time to prepare his own troops for the battle. When Ahitophel saw that his advice was not followed, he committed suicide by hanging himself.

=== Battle of Ephraim's Wood ===
A fateful battle was fought in the Wood of Ephraim (the name suggests a locality west of the Jordan) and Absalom's army was completely routed. When Absalom fled from David's army, his head was caught in the boughs of an oak tree as the mule he was riding ran beneath it. He was discovered there still alive by one of David's men, who reported this to Joab, the king's commander. Joab, accustomed to avenging himself, took this opportunity to even the score with Absalom. Absalom had once set Joab's field of barley on fire and then made Amasa Captain of the Host instead of Joab. Killing Absalom was against David's explicit command, "Beware that none touch the young man Absalom". Joab injured Absalom with three darts through the heart and Absalom was subsequently killed by ten of Joab's armor-bearers.

When David heard that Absalom was killed, although not how he was killed, he greatly sorrowed.

O my son Absalom, my son, my son Absalom! Would I had died instead of you, O Absalom, my son, my son!

— 2 Sam 18:33

David withdrew to the city of Mahanaim in mourning, until Joab roused him from "the extravagance of his grief" and called on him to fulfill his duty to his people.

=== Memorial ===
Absalom had erected a monument near Jerusalem to perpetuate his name:

Now Absalom in his lifetime had taken and reared up for himself a pillar, which is in the king's dale: for he said, I have no son to keep my name in remembrance: and he called the pillar after his own name: and it is called unto this day, Absalom's place.

— 2 Sam 18:18

An ancient monument in the Kidron Valley near the Old City of Jerusalem, known as the Tomb of Absalom or Absalom's Pillar and traditionally identified as the monument of the biblical narrative, is now dated by modern archaeologists to the first century AD. The Jewish Encyclopedia reports: "A tomb twenty feet high and twenty-four feet square, which late tradition points out as the resting-place of Absalom. It is situated in the eastern part of the valley of Kidron, to the east of Jerusalem." It existed in the days of Josephus. Conder, in Hastings' Dictionary of the Bible, states it is the tomb of Hasmonean King Alexander Jannæus. In a 2013 conference, Professor Gabriel Barkay suggested that it could be the tomb of Herod Agrippa I, the grandson of Herod the Great, based in part on the similarity to Herod's newly discovered tomb at Herodium. For centuries, it was the custom among passers-by—Jews, Christians and Muslims—to throw stones at the monument. Residents of Jerusalem would bring their unruly children to the site to teach them what became of a rebellious son.

== Rabbinic literature ==
The explanation in Rabbinic literature about why Ahithophel had advised Absalom to act against his father: The Talmud speaks of this counsellor of David as "a man, like Balaam, whose great wisdom was not received in humility as a gift from heaven, and so became a stumbling block to him." He was "one of those who, while casting longing eyes upon things not belonging to them, also lose the things they possess." Accordingly, Ahithophel was granted access by Almighty God into the Divine powers of God. And being thus familiar with Divine wisdom and knowledge as imparted through the Holy Spirit, he was consulted as an oracle like the Urim and Thummim. "..and great as was his wisdom, it was equalled by his scholarship. Therefore, David did not hesitate to submit himself to his instruction, even though Ahithophel was a young man at his death, not more than thirty-three years old. The one thing lacking in him was sincere piety, which proved his undoing in the end, for it induced him to participate in Absalom's rebellion against David. Thus, he forfeited even his share in the world to come. To this dire course of action, he was misled by astrology and other signs, which he interpreted as prophecies of his kingship when in reality, they pointed to the royal destiny of his granddaughter Bath-sheba. Possessed by his erroneous belief, he cunningly urged Absalom to commit an unheard-of crime. Thus, Absalom would profit nothing by his rebellion, for, though he accomplished his father's ruin, he would yet be held to account and condemned to death for his violation of family purity, and the way to the throne would be clear for Ahithophel, the great sage in Israel." The life and death of Absalom offered to the rabbis a welcome theme wherewith to warn the people against false ambition, vainglory, and unfilial conduct. The vanity with which he displayed his beautiful hair, the rabbis say, became his snare and his stumbling-block. "By his long hair the Nazirite entangled the people to rebel against his father, and by it he himself became entangled, to fall a victim to his pursuers". And again, elsewhere: "By his vile stratagem he deceived and stole three hearts, that of his father, of the elders, and finally of the whole nation of Israel, and for this reason three darts were thrust into his heart to end his treacherous life". More striking is the following: "Did one ever hear of an oak-tree having a heart? And yet in the oak-tree in whose branches Absalom was caught, we read that upon its heart he was held up still alive while the darts were thrust through him. This is to show that when a man becomes so heartless as to make war against his own father, nature itself takes on a heart to avenge the deed."

"The knowledge that a part of Absalom's following sided with him in secret,--that, though he was pursued by his son, his friends remained true to him,--somewhat consoled David in his distress. He thought that in these circumstances, if the worst came to the worst, Absalom would at least feel pity for him. At first, however, the despair of David knew no bounds. He was on the point of worshipping an idol, when his friend Hushai the Archite approached him, saying: "The people will wonder that such a king should serve idols." David replied: "Should a king such as I am be killed by his own son? It is better for me to serve idols than that God should be held responsible for my misfortune, and His Name thus be desecrated." Hushai reproached him: "Why didst thou marry a captive?" "There is no wrong in that," replied David, "it is permitted according to the law." Thereupon Hushai: "But thou didst disregard the connection between the passage permitting it and the one that follows almost immediately after it in the Scriptures, dealing with the disobedient and rebellious son, the natural issue of such a marriage." Absalom's end was beset with terrors. When he was caught in the branches of the oak-tree, he was about to sever his hair with a sword stroke, but suddenly he saw hell yawning beneath him, and he preferred to hang in the tree to throwing himself into the abyss alive. Absalom's crime was, indeed, of a nature to deserve the supreme torture, for which reason he is one of the few Jews who have no portion in the world to come.

Popular legend states that the eye of Absalom was of immense size, signifying his insatiable greed. Indeed, "hell itself opened beneath him, and David, his father, cried seven times: 'My son! my son!' while bewailing his death, praying at the same time for his redemption from the seventh section of Gehenna, to which he was consigned". According to R. Meir, "he has no share in the life to come". And according to the description of Gehenna by Joshua ben Levi, who, like Dante, wandered through hell under the guidance of the angel Duma, Absalom still dwells there, having the rebellious heathen in charge; and when the angels with their fiery rods run also against Absalom to smite him like the rest, a heavenly voice says: "Spare Absalom, the son of David, My servant." "That the extreme penalties of hell were thus averted from him, was on account of David's eightfold repetition of his son's name in his lament over him. Besides, David's intercession had the effect of re-attaching Absalom's severed head to his body. An account of Joshua Ben Levi going to the fifth compartment of Paradise reports: "The fifth compartment is of silver, and gold, and refined gold, and of crystal, and bdellium; and through its midst flows the river Gihon. The walls are of silver and gold, and a perfume breathes through it more exquisite than the perfume of Lebanon. And beds of silver and gold are there prepared, covered with violet and purple covers, woven by Eve, and mixed with scarlet and made of hair of goats, woven by angels. Here dwell the Messiah and Elijah in a palanquin of the wood of Lebanon; the pillars thereof of silver, the bottom thereof of gold, the seat of it of purple. Herein lieth the Messiah, the son of David, who is the love of the daughters of Jerusalem, the midst thereof is love. The prophet Elijah takes the head of the Messiah and places it in his bosom and says to him: "Be quiet and wait, for the end draweth nigh." On every Monday and Thursday and Saturday and Holiday the Patriarchs come to him and the fathers of the Tribes and Moses and Aaron and David and Solomon and every king of Israel and of the house of Judah, and they weep with him and comfort him, and say unto him: "Be quiet and wait and rely upon thy Creator, for the end draweth nigh." Also Korah and his company and Dathan and Abiram and Absalom come to him on every Wednesday, and ask him: "When will the end of our misery come? When wilt thou reveal thyself?"16. He answereth them and says: "Go to your fathers and ask them." And when they hear of their fathers they feel ashamed and do not ask any further. King David's prayers granted his rebellious son Avshalom access to the World to Come At his death Absalom was childless, for all his children, his three sons and his daughter, died before him, as a punishment for his having set fire to a field of grain belonging to Joab." Although Absalom avenged his sister's defilement by Amnon, ironically he proved himself to be little different from Amnon. As Amnon had sought the advice of Jonadab in order to rape Tamar, Absalom had sought the advice of Ahitophel who advised Absalom to have incestuous relations with his father's concubines in order to show all Israel how odious he was to his father [2 Samuel 16:20]. Likewise as Amnon had brought two curses on himself for incest with his half sister and failing to fulfill the Torah Law, Absalom brought four curses on himself for dishonoring his father; relations with his father's wives [concubines]; and failing to fulfill the Torah Law twice. [Deuteronomy 27:20 26] The Rabbis explain that the concubines were not punished by God. They were violated by Absalom. Absalom with his own free will, choose to do that. It is true God created a world where we humans can choose good or evil, but the choice in the end remains ours. Although God had told David that his wives would be taken, he did not ordain or force Absalom to violate them. He just foretold it. Is A lesson to be learned of the consequences from Absalom life is that his lust for power was so deep that he engaged in acts of chillul hashem and brought upon himself 4 curses from the Torah? (Dishonoring his father by his revolt; dishonoring his father's wives; and twice bring curses on himself for not fulfilling the Torah law)?Yes. He was a prince who could have had almost anything. The only things he wanted were things he could not have. He lusted after his sister and his father's throne. Wealth is not determined by possessions but by mindset. In his mind, Absalom was a pauper. He only looked at what he did not have.(Lusting after Tamar by Absalom would have brought two more curses on him-a forbidden relationship with his sister and not fulfilling the Torah law)

== Art and literature ==
=== Art ===
- Absalom and Tamar (Guercino)
- Thamar (Cabanel)

=== Poetry ===
- The Love of King David and Fair Bethsabe, with the Tragedie of Absalon, a play by George Peele, written before 1594 and published in 1599.
- Absalom and Achitophel (1681), a satirical poem by John Dryden, uses the biblical story as an allegory for contemporary politics.
- "Absalom" by Nathaniel Parker Willis (1806–1867).
- "Absaloms Abfall" by Rainer Maria Rilke ("The Fall of Absalom", trans. Stephen Cohn).
- "Absalom" is a section in Muriel Rukeyser's long poem The Book of the Dead (1938), inspired by the biblical text, spoken by a mother who lost three sons to silicosis.
- "Avshalom" by Yona Wallach, published in her first poetry collection Devarim (1966), alludes to the biblical character.
- "Prayer for Sunset" by Leonard Cohen, published in his first poetry collection Let Us Compare Mythologies (1956), Absalom appears in a simile.

=== Fiction ===
- In the 1946 short story "Absalom" by C.L. Moore and Henry Kuttner, the character Absalom is a child prodigy, who does non-consensual brain surgery on his father (a former child prodigy, though not as intelligent as his son) to make the father totally focused on Absalom's success. This relates to the Biblical story of the son usurping his father.
- Georg Christian Lehms, Des israelitischen Printzens Absolons und seiner Prinzcessin Schwester Thamar Staats- Lebens- und Helden-Geschichte (The Heroic Life and History of the Israelite Prince Absolom and his Princess Sister Tamar), novel in German published in Nuremberg, 1710.
- Absalom, Absalom! is a novel by William Faulkner, and refers to the return of the main character Thomas Sutpen's son.
- Oh Absalom! was the original title of Howard Spring's novel My Son, My Son!, later adapted for the film of the latter name.
- Cry, the Beloved Country by Alan Paton. Absalom was the name of Stephen Kumalo's son in the novel. Like the Biblical Absalom, Absalom Kumalo was at odds with his father, the two fighting a moral and ethical battle of sorts over the course of some of the novel's most important events. Absalom kills and murders a man, and also meets an untimely death.
- Throughout Robertson Davies's The Manticore a comparison is repeatedly made between the protagonist's problematic relations with his father and those of the Biblical Absalom and King David. Paradoxically, in the modern version, it is the rebellious son who has the first name "David". The book also introduces the term "Absalonism", as a generic term for a son's rebellion against his father.
- Absalom appears as a prominent character in Peter Shaffer's play Yonadab, which portrays Amnon's rape of Tamar and his murder at Absalom's hands.
- A scene in the Swedish writer Frans G. Bengtsson's historical novel "The Long Ships" depicts a 10th Century Christian missionary recounting the story of Absalom's rebellion to the assembled Danish court, including the aging King Harald Bluetooth and his son Sweyn Forkbeard; thereupon, King Harald exclaims "Some people can learn a lesson from this story!", casting a meaningful glance at his son Sweyn—whom the King (rightly) suspects of plotting a rebellion.
- In the novel The Book of Tamar by Nel Havas, the story of Absalom is presented from the viewpoint of his sister. While closely following the main events as related in the Bible, Havas concentrates on the motives behind Absalom's actions, which Havas presents as more complex than depicted in the scriptures.
- In the novel Ender's Shadow by Orson Scott Card, the main character Bean invokes the quote to give solace to the kamikaze pilots Ender had unknowingly sent to their deaths to defeat the Formics.
- The role played by luxuriant hair in the death of Absalom is referenced to telling effect in the ghost story The Diary of Mr Poynter by master of the genre M.R. James. The ghost in question is that of dissolute young nobleman Sir Everard Charlett, known to his Oxford University cronies by the nickname Absalom, on account of his beautiful, long hair and debauched lifestyle. Sir Everard has commemorated his flowing locks by the unusual expedient of having them portrayed in a wallpaper pattern, which later proves to have the power to summon his malign, hair-covered ghost - much to the horror of James's unfortunate protagonist, Mr. James Denton.

=== Music ===
- Josquin des Prez composed the motet "Absalon, fili mi" on the occasion of the death of Juan Borgia (Absalon being a further alternative spelling).
- Nicholas Gombert composed the two-part, eight-voice motet "Lugebat David Absalon".
- Heinrich Schütz (1585–1672) composed "Fili mi, Absalon" as part of his Sinfoniae Sacrae, op. 6.
- The single verse, 2 Samuel 18:33, regarding David's grief at the loss of his son ("And the king was much moved, and went up to the chamber over the gate, and wept: and as he went, thus he said, O my son Absalom, my son, my son Absalom! would God I had died for thee, O Absalom, my son, my son!"), is the inspiration for the text of several pieces of choral music, usually entitled When David Heard (such as those by Renaissance composers Thomas Tomkins and Thomas Weelkes, or modern composers Eric Whitacre, Joshua Shank, and Norman Dinerstein). This verse is also used in "David's Lamentation" by William Billings, first published in 1778.
- Leonard Cohen's poem "Prayer for Sunset" compares the setting sun to the raving Absalom, and asks whether another Joab will arrive tomorrow night to kill Absalom again.
- "Absalom, Absalom" is a song on the 1996 Compass CD Making Light of It by singer/songwriter Pierce Pettis, incorporating several elements of the biblical narrative.
- The Australian composer Nigel Butterley set the verse in his 2008 choral work "Beni Avshalom", commissioned by the Sydney Chamber Choir.
- During the finale of the song "Distant Early Warning" by Canadian band Rush, Geddy Lee sings, "Absalom, Absalom, Absalom"; lyrics written by drummer Neil Peart.
- David Olney's 2000 CD Omar's Blues includes the song "Absalom". The song depicts David grieving over the death of his son.
- The story of Absalom is referred to several places in folk singer Adam Arcuragi's song "Always Almost Crying".
- The San Francisco–based band Om mentions Absalom in their song "Kapila's Theme" from their debut album Variations on a Theme.
- The garage folk band David's Doldrums references Absalom in their song, "My Name Is Absalom". The song alludes to Absalom's feelings of solemnity and abandonment of love and hope.
- In "Every Kind Word" by Lackthereof, Danny Seim's project parallel to Menomena, Seim sings "... and your hair is long like Absalom."
- "Barach Hamelech", an Israeli song by Amos Etinger and Yosef Hadar.
- The grindcore band Discordance Axis references Absalom at the end of the track entitled "Castration Rite".
- In 2007 Ryland Angel released "Absalom" on Ryland Angel-Manhattan Records.
- "Hanging By His Hair" from the 1998 Wormwood album by The Residents recounts Absalom's defiance and death. Also performed on Roadworms (The Berlin Sessions) and Wormwood Live.
- "Absalom" is a song on Brand New Shadows's debut album, White Flags. It is a mournful lament from King David's perspective.
- "Absalom" is an album by the experimental/progressive band Stick Men featuring Tony Levin, Markus Reuter and Pat Mastelotto.
- The American Rock band Little Feat reference Absalom in their song "Gimme a Stone" on the album entitled Chinese Work Songs. This song is written from the perspective of King David—mainly focusing on the task of fighting Goliath—but contains a lament to Absalom. This was a cover of the song, the original being on the 1998 Americana concept album Largo, by David Forman and Levon Helm.
