= Hawks Nest Tunnel disaster =

1930–1935 industrial disaster in the U.S. state of West Virginia

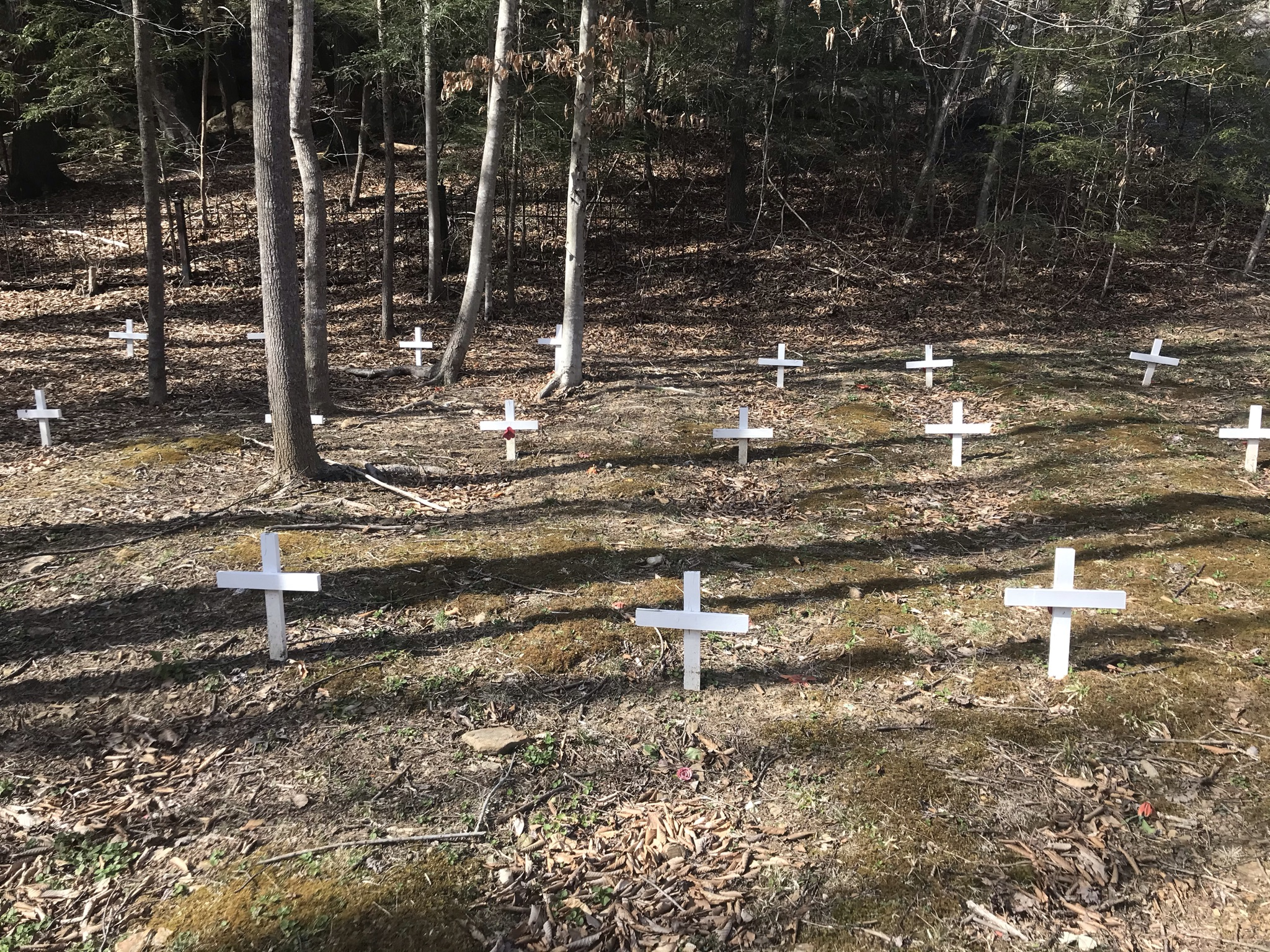
- Grave site
- Date: 1930–1935
- Location: Gauley Bridge, West Virginia; 38°07′20″N 81°07′42″W
- Cause: occupational silicosis
- Deaths: 476 to 1,000 (estimated)

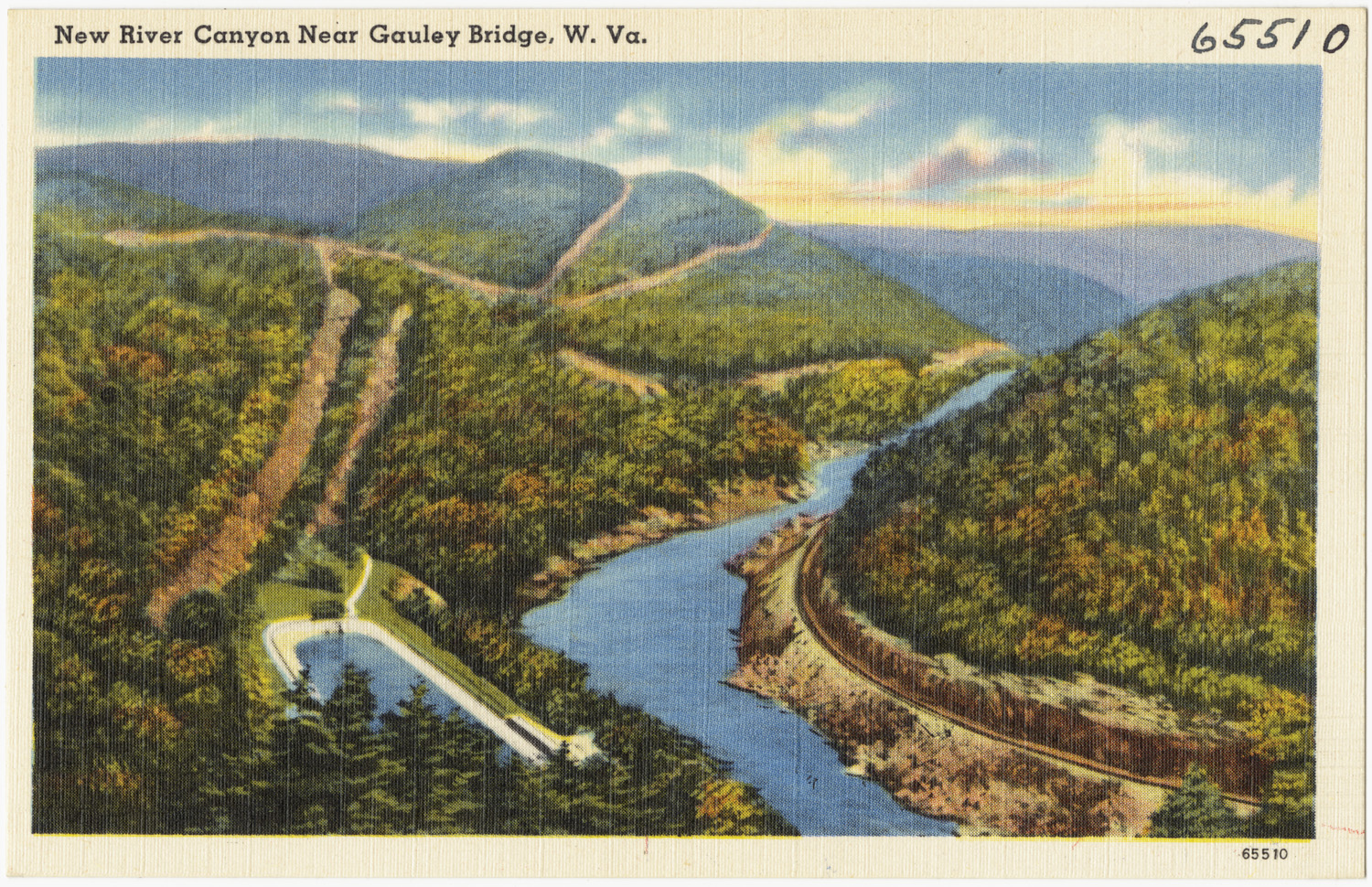
New River canyon near Gauley Bridge

The Hawks Nest Tunnel disaster was a large-scale incident of occupational lung disease in the 1930s resulting from construction of the 32–36-foot (9.8–11.0 m) wide Hawks Nest Tunnel near Gauley Bridge, West Virginia, as part of a hydroelectric project. At least 476 people, and possibly as many as 1,000, died from chronic exposure to airborne silicate particles in what is considered one of the worst industrial disasters in American history.

The disaster's roots lay in the push to have enough hydroelectric power for a metallurgical plant in the town of Boncar, later named Alloy, West Virginia. It involved one of the country's largest corporations, Union Carbide and Carbon Company, and occurred during the early years of the Great Depression. The primary actors, in addition to Union Carbide and Carbon Company, were Rinehart and Dennis, a regional construction company, and thousands of people searching for work. In the end, an estimated 4,800 men (approximately 1,700 white and 3,100 black) worked on the project, but only 738 white men worked underground. Many of the black men had migrated from the South.

The general causes for the disaster were a push for speed, which led to the majority of the drilling being done dry, rather than wet, and a lack of concern for employee safety. This led many laborers to develop silicosis, many of whom died. By 1934, 40 supervisors were also seriously ill.

The many cases of illness and death led to national publicity, 538 lawsuits and a Congressional investigation in 1936. The resulting publicity reached the general public and led to socially minded artists, such as Muriel Rukeyser, taking an interest in the incident. Rukeyser visited in 1936 and published her book of poems, The Book of the Dead, in 1938.

In recent decades, the disaster has once again become a subject for study. A resident of the region, Patricia Spangler, published Hawk's Nest Tunnel: An Unabridged History in 2008, and Cultural Resource Analysts conducted a cultural historic survey for the Hawks Nest-Glen Ferris Hydroelectric Project. In addition to scholarly work, the disaster led to the creation of a memorial which commemorates those who died, and has also been memorialized in numerous works of nonfiction writing, art, and film.

== Background ==
The hydroelectric project began in 1927, when Union Carbide and Carbon Company, later shortened to Union Carbide, created a wholly owned subsidiary, the New Kanawha Power Company. The name "Kanawha" comes from the Native American tribe upon whose land the project would be built.

The Kanawha River, a tributary of the Ohio River and West Virginia's largest inland waterway at 96.5 miles (155.3 km), begins near the town of Gauley Bridge. By itself, it did not have sufficient flow to generate useful amounts of hydroelectric power. The plan was therefore to divert water from the fast-flowing New River through Gauley Mountain to generate hydroelectric power at a plant in Alloy, West Virginia. An additional advantage of this tunnel was that it had a downward angle of 162 feet (49 m). The power station would be run by the Electro-Metallurgical Company, Union Carbide’s manufacturing subsidiary.

The project came to employ nearly 3,000 men, three-fourths of them African-American. The first step was to construct a dam immediately below Hawks Nest to divert water from the New River near Ansted, West Virginia into the tunnel. The water would then re-enter the Kanawha River near Gauley Bridge, leaving a section known as "The Dries" in between. Beginning on March 31, 1930, its contractor, Rinehart and Dennis, the lowest bidder among 35 and one of only a few large enough to tackle this project, began construction of the 3-mile (4.8 km) tunnel carrying the river under Gauley Mountain. They had two years to complete the project. According to records, the workers created between 250 and 300 feet (76 and 91 metres) of tunnel per week.

== Workers ==
Facing widespread unemployment during the Great Depression, thousands of itinerant workers came to West Virginia to find employment excavating the tunnel. Even though nearly 80 percent of the people of Fayette County, where the project was located, were white, the majority of the workforce hired was African American. Their wages were paid in scrip, which meant they had to use the company store, and they were paid at a lower rate than white workers. Still, they were happy to have work at all. One worker, Shirley Jones, who, at 18, was expecting to make good money and return home to wed, said, “Think of it, honey. A job! Twenty-five cents an hour, 12 hours a day. That’s—why, that’s $3 a day! We’ll be marryin' soon, honey.” He was the first to die.

They worked ten- to fifteen-hour shifts using drills and dynamite to mine sandstone composed primarily of cemented quartz (silica) sand. Once Rinehart and Dennis learned that the tunnel's route would be through a vein of high-quality silica, used to make ferrosilicon which is used when making steel, they desired both speed and a process to extract and save the valuable silica rather than merely diminish its presence. The extracted silica, as much as 300,000 tons per day, saved Union Carbide "millions of dollars" by offsetting the costs of excavation. The situation for the workers, however, became even less stable.

As a result, according to transcripts from a congressional inquiry in 1936, the company chose not to use "wet drilling", a type of drilling that removes harmful dust; the workers were not given any masks or breathing equipment to use while mining. Some reports claim the silica turned drinking water white. Black workers told Congress in 1936 that they were denied breaks and even forced to work at gunpoint by "shack rousters" or individuals who served as law enforcement. One worker recalled in a 1936 newsreel that, "each and every day I worked in that tunnel, I helped carry off 10 to 14 men who was overcome by the dust." The workers also pointed out that management wore safety equipment during inspection visits.

The results of the practices encouraged and sometimes required by Rinehart and Dennis led to the project being completed more than twice as quickly as originally projected. A secondary result, also due to these practices, was the workers' overexposure to crystalline silica dust; many workers developed acute or accelerated silicosis (and, potentially, fibroid phthisis), a debilitating and incurable occupational lung disease that causes severe pulmonary fibrosis (scarring) and fluid build-up in the lungs, leading to progressive respiratory failure and suffocation. According to the Union Carbide report, 80 percent of the workers became ill, left the workplace, or died within six months.

A large number of workers eventually died from silicosis, in some cases within a year. There are no definitive statistics as to the Hawks Nest death toll, partially because many African-American workers from the South returned home or left the region after becoming sick, making it difficult to calculate an accurate total. Union Carbide estimated the number of deaths at 109, which is the number documented in a historical marker at the site. A congressional hearing in 1936 placed the death toll at 476. Martin Cherniak, a physician who published a history of the event, put the number at 764. Other sources estimate the number of deaths between 700 to over 1,000 deaths among the 3,000 workers.

== Legal trials and government investigations ==
The tragedy led to two major trials and a congressional investigation, yet even today, neither Rinehart and Dennis (still in operation) nor Union Carbide admit any guilt or responsibility.

In 1932, the first legal claim leading to a trial came from Cora Jones, who filed a suit against Rinehart and Dennis after her husband and three sons died. The trial ended in 1933, after hearing nearly 170 witnesses. The jury could not make a decision, and the victims ended up receiving a small settlement of $130,000; lawyers took their 50 percent. Overall, there were 538 lawsuits filed, requesting a total of $4 million.

In 1936, the U.S. House of Representatives Committee on Labor summarized their findings by saying "the tunnel was begun, continued, and completed with grave and inhuman disregard of all consideration for the health, lives and futures of the employees. That as a result many workmen became infected with silicosis; that many have died from the disease and many not yet dead are doomed to die." Union Carbide and Carbon Company responded with their own report.

== Regulatory legacy ==
Prior to the 1970s, respirator standards were under the purview of the US Bureau of Mines (USBM). An example of an early respirator standard, Type A, established in 1926, was intended to protect against mechanically generated dusts produced in mines. These standards were intended to obviate miner deaths, noted to have reached 3,243 by 1907. Prior to the Hawks Nest Tunnel disaster, these standards were merely advisory, as the USBM had no enforcement power at the time. After the disaster, an explicit approval program was established in 1934, along with the introduction of combination Type A/B/C respirator ratings, corresponding to Dusts/Fumes/Mists respectively, with Type D blocking all three, under 30 CFR 14 Schedule 21.

== Hawks Nest workers memorials and gravesites ==
In 1986, West Virginia placed a historical marker, a three-foot sign, at the site. The marker, at Hawks Nest State Park, reads:

Construction of nearby tunnel, diverting waters of New River through Gauley Mt for hydroelectric power, resulted in state's worst industrial disaster. Silica rock dust caused 109 admitted deaths in mostly black, migrant underground work force of 3,000. Congressional hearing placed toll at 476 for 1930-35. Tragedy brought recognition of acute silicosis as occupational lung disease and compensation legislation to protect workers.

In 2009, another memorial to the Hawks Nest workers and their gravesite was installed at 98 Hilltop Drive in Mount Lookout, near Summersville Lake and U.S. Route 19. The site is located several miles from Martha White’s farm at Summersville where many of the black miners were buried, since they were not allowed to be buried in "white" cemeteries. The location of the site was rediscovered with help of West Virginia State University professor Richard Hartman, after local couple George and Charlotte Yeager spearheaded effort to build the memorial in 2009. The memorial was dedicated on September 7, 2012. The memorial, unmarked for 40 years, also sits where the Department of Highways reburied the bodies of about 48 miners while widening U.S. Route 19. The text reads:

This Memorial honors an estimated 764 tunnel workers who died from mining a 3.8 mile tunnel through Gauley Mountain to divert water from the New River to a hydroelectric plant near Gauley Bridge in 1930–31. The tunnel cut through almost pure silica in some areas and exposed the unprotected workers to silica dust that quickly caused acute silicosis, a fatal lung disease. This is considered America's worst industrial disaster. Workers in the tunnel were primarily migrant workers, mostly black, who were paid a few dollars per day. When they became sick, many were driven out of the camps to die elsewhere. Those African Americans who died in the camps could not be buried in local "white" cemeteries. A few were sent by rail back to their families. More were taken at night under the cover of darkness to Summersville and buried unceremoniously on a farm. Later these graves had to be moved to widen US Route 19. The remains were disinterred in 1972 and transported several miles to the present site. The decomposed remains were placed in child size coffins and reburied here, resulting in about 48 small grave depressions seen at this grave site.

An online site, Hawk's Nest Names, commemorates those who were killed as a result of this disaster. The site also contains the 1936 report from Union Carbide and Carbon Company, focusing on accident and mortality data and miscellaneous data on silicosis.

== Cultural references ==
- 1936: Under the pseudonym of "Pinewood Tom," Josh White wrote and sang "Silicosis Is Killing Me" (1936), describing the plight of the miners. An article about this song is available in the Internet Archives.
- 1938: Muriel Rukeyser wrote a poetry sequence, The Book of the Dead, about this disaster, which can be found in her collection of poems: U.S. 1 (Covici and Friede, 1938).
- 1938: Vladimir Pozner's Disunited States (chapter "Cadavers, By-products of Dividends"), Seven Stories Press, 2014 (Les Etats-Désunis was originally published in French in 1938)
- 1941: Hubert Skidmore, a West Virginian, immortalized the tragic events from the common man's perspective in his book Hawk's Nest (originally published in 1941). This book followed the fictional accounts of several tunnel workers and their families. Skidmore wrote the book only a few years after the incident and likely used direct sources for his story development.
- 1998: The tragedy was included in Saints and Villains, a 1998 novel by Denise Giardina.
- 2001: Hawks Nest is also mentioned in a section entitled Dying for a Living: The Hawk's Nest Incident in the book Trust Us, We're Experts (2001) by Sheldon Rampton and John Stauber.
- 2016: "The Book of the Dead," an essay by Catherine V. Moore with Photos by Lisa Elmaleh.
- 2024: Appalachian Ghost: A Photographic Reimagining of the Hawk's Nest Tunnel Disaster by Raymond Thompson, Jr.
- 2025: Gardiner Harris discusses Hawks Nest in his 2025 book No More Tears: The Dark Secrets of Johnson & Johnson.
- 2025: David Kelley's film, The Book of the Dead.

== See also ==
- Gauley Bridge
- Hawks Nest State Park
- New River
- Bhopal disaster, another Union Carbide-involved disaster
