= Hawk's Nest (novel) =

Hawk's Nest is a novel written by West Virginia author Hubert Skidmore, published in 1941. A fictionalized account of one of America's greatest industrial disasters, it is an account of the Hawks Nest Tunnel disaster in which hundreds or thousands of men were sickened and died as a result of silicosis they contracted while digging the tunnel under unsafe conditions. The novel follows the lives of many representative characters as their health begins to fail, and as their health complaints are ignored by Union Carbide, the contractor which dug the tunnel and installed the hydroelectric plant.

The characters in Hawk's Nest are broadly representative: ruined West Virginia farmers work alongside Dust Bowl refugees, eastern European immigrants and even middle-class men ruined by the Depression. In the historical disaster, African American men accounted for the largest percentage of deaths, and Skidmore acknowledges that fact even though the African Americans in Hawk's Nest are secondary characters.

One of Skidmore's characters, a dying teenager, begs doctors to perform an autopsy on his body so that the cause of his illness can be discovered and so that other workers might be saved. In her 1938 poem "Book of the Dead," Muriel Rukeyser tells an identical story.

Hawk's Nest was republished in 2004 by the University of Tennessee Press and has gained some small amount of popularity since reappearing. An often repeated story claims that the book's first edition was pulled from many shelves due to pressure from Union Carbide Co., the company responsible for the countless deaths recounted in the novel.
