= Susan Osborn =

Susan Osborn may refer to:

- Susan Osborn (musician)
- Susan Osborn (writer)

== See also ==
- Susan Osborne, mayor of Boulder, Colorado
