= Saints and Villains =

1998 novel by Denise Giardina

- Author: Denise Giardina
- Language: English
- Genre: Historical fiction
- Published: 1999 (W. W. Norton)
- Publication place: United States
- ISBN: 978-0-393-04571-0

Saints and Villains is a 1998 novel by Denise Giardina. It is a fictionalized biography of Dietrich Bonhoeffer, a German Lutheran pastor who opposed fascism, became involved in a plot to assassinate Hitler, and was ultimately hanged by the Nazis. Saints and Villains was awarded the Boston Book Review fiction prize and was semifinalist for the International Dublin Literary Award.

== Plot Synopsis ==
Saints and Villains recreates the life and martyrdom of German pastor and theologian Dietrich Bonhoeffer, who participated in a plot to kill Hitler and was executed at Buchenwald in the waning days of World War II.

Raised in a privileged, upper-middle-class German family at the beginning of the 20th century, Bonhoeffer is a sheltered and dreamy loner, indulged and protected by his family. After failing to develop as a musician, he turns to theology, initially as an academic pursuit, not a spiritual calling. His studies lead him to Union Theological Seminary in New York, where he meets Reinhold Niebuhr and social activist Myles Horton. He befriends an African American student, Fred Bishop, who introduces him to the endemic racism in the United States, and takes him to visit both Harlem and Appalachia, where he witnesses racism and poverty first hand. The most impactful of these experiences is the Hawks Nest Tunnel Disaster of 1927, in which hundreds of mostly Black men mysteriously die after being pulled off bread lines to help dig a tunnel. Bonhoeffer disguises himself as a worker, actually and symbolically stripping himself of all articles of selfhood: He must hide his glasses, pretend to be mute because he has an accent, and don ragged clothes to fit in. This sense of being depersonalized foreshadows what happens to Jews in Germany upon his return.

Bonhoeffer returns to Germany, and soon after, Hitler and the Nazis come to power. When attacks on Jews became open public policy after the Reichstag fire of 1933, Bonhoeffer's writings and sermons take on an increasingly anti-Nazi tone. When the Nazis set up a state church, he helps found another pastoral movement in opposition, and speaks as a representative of that movement at the 1936 Olympics.

As the Nazis become increasingly violent, anti-Semitic and anti-intellectual, Bonhoeffer feels compelled to act. He takes a job as a low-level military intelligence agent in the Abwehr, working with a group of upper-echelon Nazi officials who plot to kill Hitler. He uses his position to gather counterintelligence and to help Jews flee Germany. Bonhoeffer struggles with the moral dilemma of justifying taking one life to save others. In April 1943, Bonhoeffer is arrested and imprisoned. There, he faces the interrogator Bauer, who mocks his faith, and is a foil for all Bonhoeffer's doubts and moral quandaries.

Bonhoeffer spends the rest of the war in jail, and as the war nears its end, his fate hangs in the balance—will he be saved by the approaching Allies? However, he is hanged in April 1945, only a month before Germany's surrender.

== Background ==
Giardina had ruminated on Bonhoeffer and his work for some 20 years, ever since her mentor in the Episcopal church first gave her a book of his writings. The novel dwells upon moral decisions, most notably the acceptability of sin if the sin will prevent a greater evil. Giardina immersed herself in Bonhoeffer's life, attracted to the story because of the ambiguities of the situation. Grappling with the moral and theological struggles in the book also brought Giardina back to her church, in a journey to "live in God" that culminated with her being re-ordained in 2007, having left the church year earlier due to conflicts over miners' rights. The novel is her first narrated in the third-person. In a mirror image of her experience with her earlier novel, Storming Heaven, she began it in the first-person, and junked the first 50 pages in order to start over. She also decided to shift from past to present tense for the book's final scenes, adding suspense to the question of whether the imprisoned Bonhoeffer would be freed by the advancing Allies.

The title was suggested to her by a friend who saw the following quote from Bonhoeffer on Giardina's refrigerator:

Today there are once more saints and villains. Instead of the uniform grayness of the rainy day, we have the black storm cloud and brilliant lightning flash. Outlines stand out with exaggerated sharpness. Shakespeare’s characters walk among us. The villain and the saint emerge from primeval depths and by their appearance they tear open the infernal or the divine abyss from which they come and enable us to see for a moment into mysteries of which we had never dreamed.

— Dietrich Bonhoeffer, Ethics

Giardina also used lines from Mozart's Mass in C Minor to frame Bonhoeffer's saga and Germany's slide into Nazism and war. The music's liner notes helped her focus on the character of SS officer Alois Bauer, a music lover who serves as Dietrich's doppelgänger and is a composite of Bonhoeffer's real interrogators. Acknowledging a touch of authorly revenge, Giardina bestowed on Bauer the same surname as the New York Times reviewer who gave her book Storming Heaven its only prominent negative review. Another character invented by Giardina is Fred Bishop, a black minister studying with Bonhoeffer at New York's Union Theological Seminary. Bonhoeffer visits him in Charleston, Giardina's home town. Giardina has written in the past of the Appalachian mining wars, and used this catastrophic event to foreshadow the even more catastrophic Holocaust.

== Reception ==
Reviews of Saints and Sinners were mostly positive.

According to Kirkus Reviews, "Giardina . . . surpasses herself with this powerful re-creation of the life and martyrdom of German pastor and theologian Dietrich Bonhoeffer . . . A big novel in every sense of the word, and a triumphant portrayal of one of the century’s authentic heroes." Newsday states: "The story—compelling in and of itself—is engrossingly narrated, with an eye for significant detail, a strong sense of life’s bitter ironies, and a powerful feeling of immediacy. The characters, especially Bonhoeffer himself, are lifelike and complex. Giardina also does a fine job of evoking the temper of the times she portrays."

Publishers Weekly's positive review observes: "In a series of telling scenes brought to life with unerring choice of detail . . . Giardina exerts an admirable grip on her panoramic story." However, writing for the New York Times, Paul Baumann is less impressed. Though he recognizes Giardina's thorough knowledge of the historical and theological record, he concludes: "Despite its ambitious intentions, Saints and Villains is more a predictable dramatization of the facts than an original reimagining of a life. The pathos of Bonhoeffer's story is still best captured in his own elusive writings." The Tennessean: "The story is an important one. The Bonhoeffer drawn by Giardina is a complex character."

Susan Osborn, in her Washington Post review, recognizes that "Giardina’s strength lies in her ability to show how historical particulars craft individuality." However, the review is less laudatory about her recreation of Bonhoeffer's life from biographical sources, claiming that such work "is an act of imagination that requires an adept ability to theatricalize the person being represented and his world. Unfortunately, that ability is not well apparent here. The book consists primarily of static doctrinal and moral conversations between Bonhoeffer and others; as a result, characters sound, at best, like puppets reading from political pamphlets or philosophical treatises, at worst like characters in a grade-B war flick." She concludes, "what might otherwise have been a provocative and multifaceted psychological portrait of a Christian pacifist turned conspirator is finally a disappointingly uninspired account."

Others disagree; the Lexington Herald-Leader review claims that "Giardina creates a fictional account of Bonhoeffer that transcends the usual ‘historical novel’ as it becomes a dramatic meditation on the meaning of his life. Giardina breathes new life into Bonhoeffer. He is no longer the pristine icon of his worshipful admirers. Giardina makes him again a credible, though exceptional, person." The Philadelphia Inquirer writes, "Giardina . . . succeeds in fleshing out Bonhoeffer’s factual biographies with fine and detailed human touches–the more ‘believable’ because they are based on diligent research." The Chattanooga Times: "Saints and Villains depicts a mental and physical adventure of one man. It is a treatise on man’s inhumanity to man and one person’s courage in rising above such horrors to find his own faith strengthened in the process."
