= The Unquiet Earth =

1992 book by Denise Giardina

- First edition
- Author: Denise Giardina
- Language: English
- Genre: Historical novel
- Publication date: 1992
- Publication place: United States
- Media type: Print (Hardback and Paperback)
- ISBN: 0-393-03096-2
- OCLC: 25047949
- Dewey Decimal: 813/.54 20
- LC Class: PS3557.I136 U57 1992
- Preceded by: Storming Heaven
- Followed by: Saints and Villains

The Unquiet Earth is Denise Giardina's third novel. It was published in 1992 and won the W.D. Weatherford Award that year.

== Plot ==
Dillon and Rachel are children living on their family land, the Homeplace. From the beginning, Dillon makes claims that he loves Rachel partially because she is the only one who has memories of his father. They are first cousins.

Rachel leaves the Homeplace to attend a nursing school, where she spends several years. Dillon enlists in the British army to fight against Hitler. Upon Rachel's graduation from nursing school, she and her friend Tommie Justice enlist as nurses in the war as well.

Rachel returns to find out that the Homeplace is no longer their land. They are reunited in Justice County. Rachel continues working there as a county nurse, and Dillon works for the mine while fighting for the union against the American Coal Company and Arthur Lee, who owns it. Arthur is an acquaintance of Rachel's because he dated her friend Tommie previously and introduced her to his friend Tony.

Rachel and Dillon continue to fight. Dillion wants to marry Rachel, but it is illegal to marry a first cousin. When the trouble with the coal company gets worse, Dillon asks that Rachel leave her job for the county, and help him in the fight against the coal companies.

Rachel ends up marrying Tony, an Italian man that Tommie and Arthur Lee set her up with. She has trouble having kids with Tony and continues to stay close to Dillon. Eventually, she has sex with Dillon and have a daughter, Jackie. This is kept quiet and Jackie believes until the very end that Tony is her father.

After Rachel and Tony finally divorce due to an unhappy marriage, Tony gets remarried and has trouble again having babies. Rachel fears that this will cause him suspicion of Jackie being his and that he will try to take her away.

At the break of dawn, the Buffalo Creek flood occurs. Jackie is left alone after the deaths of Tom and Dillon in the flood, and moves away, wanting to forget the place she called home.

== Buffalo Creek flood ==
Buffalo Creek, which spans 17 miles, is located in a hollow of southern West Virginia's Logan County and consists of three branches. It was the location of one of the deadliest floods in U.S. history, the Buffalo Creek flood, killing 125 and injuring over 1,000.

On her website, Giardina says: "The Buffalo Creek ‘flood’ was the heart of my young adulthood. It is the heart of The Unquiet Earth." She says that an early draft of the novel placed the flood in 1972, when the real flood occurred. Because Giardina believed that the event was "too dramatic and destructive" to be placed in the middle of the story, she placed the flood at the end in order to balance the novel.
