= Battle of the Wood of Ephraim =

Biblical civil conflict among Israelites

- Part of Absalom's Revolt
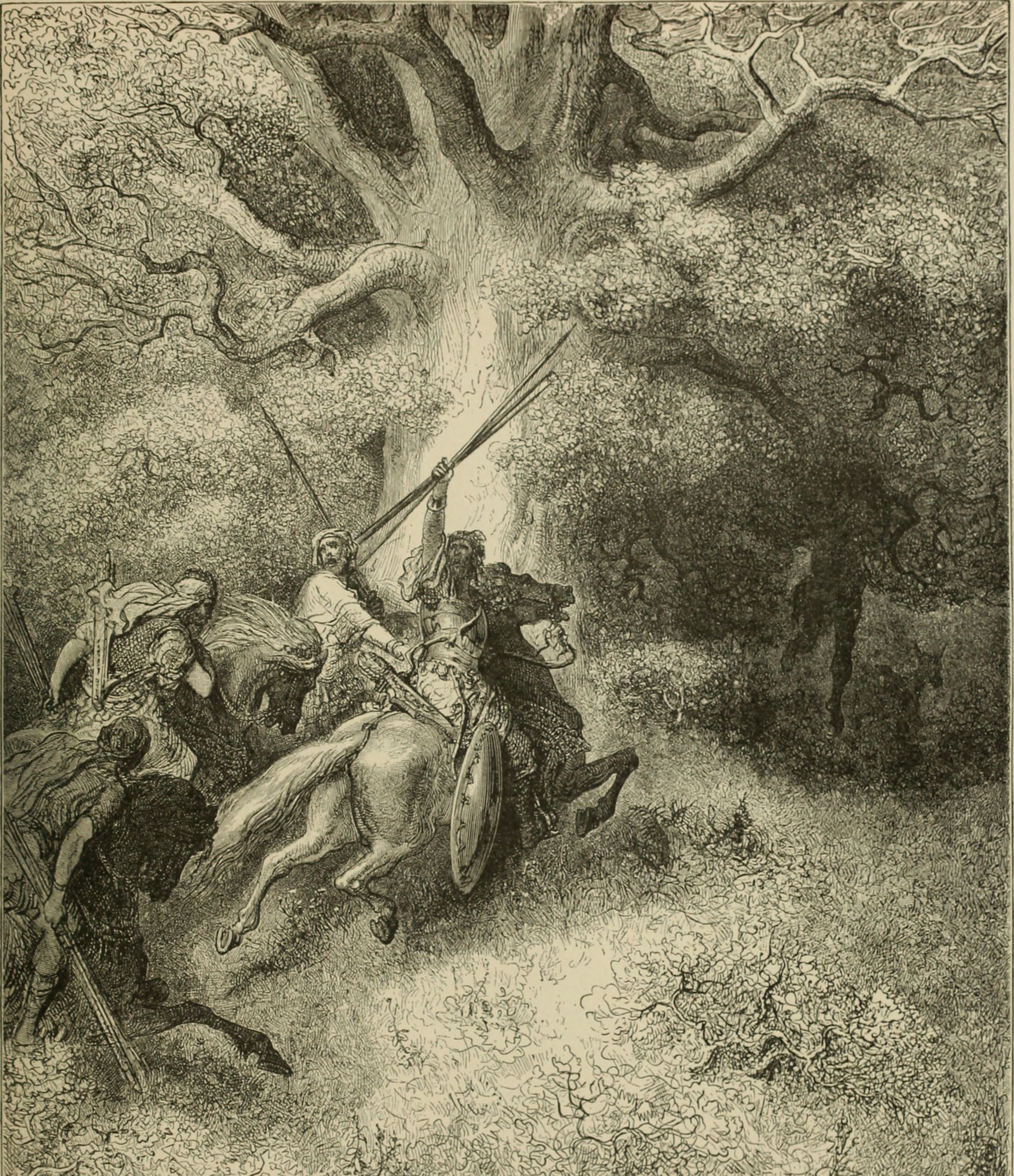
- Relief of Joab (front rider) riding on a horse to put an end to Absalom's princely rebellion
Date	c. 1020 B.C.
Location	Wood of Ephraim, Tribe of Ephraim, Kingdom of Israel
Result	Victory for David; Absalom killed

Belligerents
Forces of King David	Forces of Absalom

Commanders and leaders
David; Joab; Abishai; Ittai	Absalom †; Amasa

Casualties and losses
Unknown; Light	Unknown; Heavy: 20,000 killed

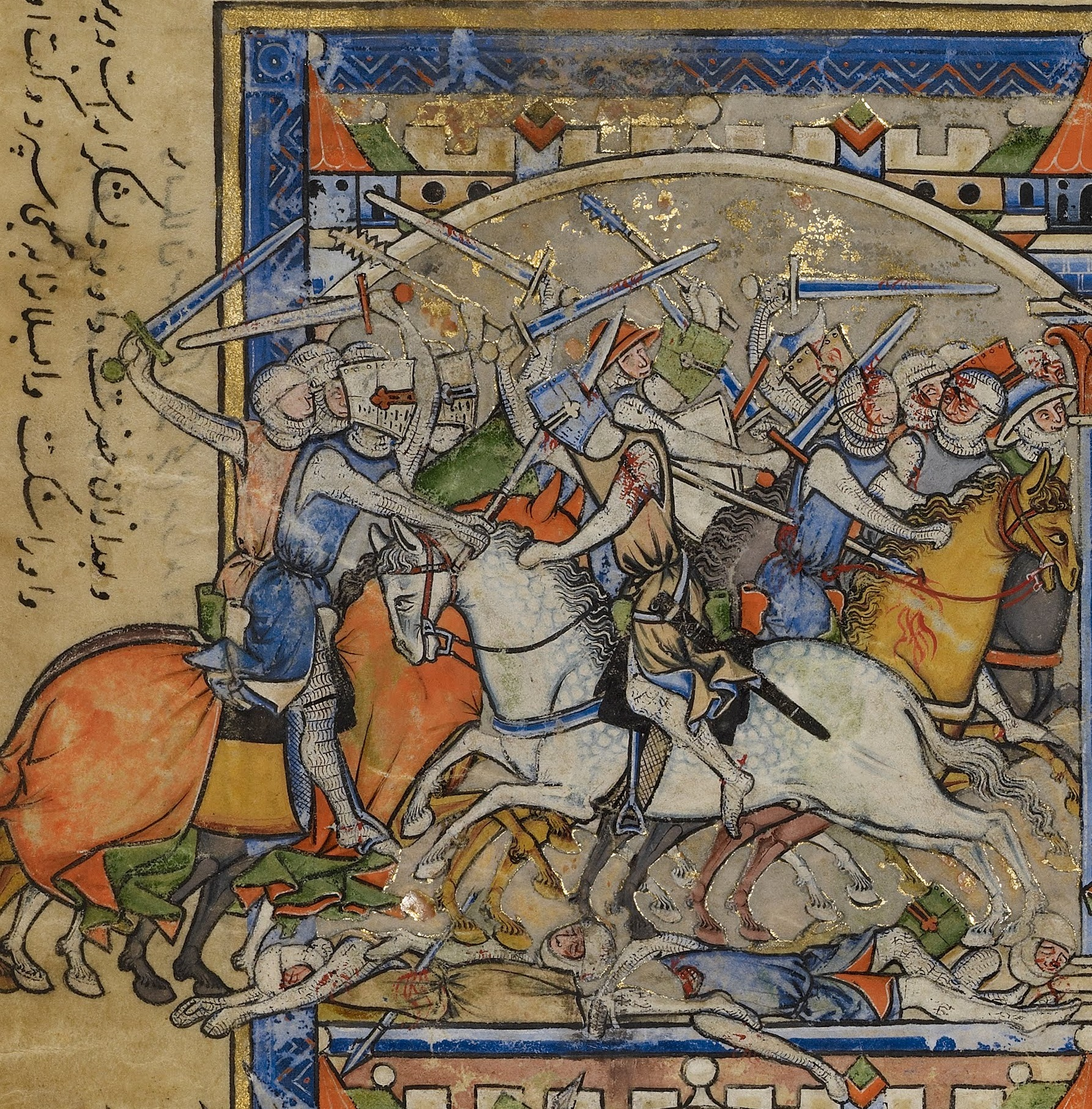
The Battle of the Wood of Ephraim, from the Morgan Bible

According to 2 Samuel, the Battle of the Wood of Ephraim was a military conflict between the rebel forces of the formerly exiled Israelite prince Absalom against the royal forces of his father King David during a short-lived revolt.

Scholarly opinion is divided as to the historicity of the events in the Books of Samuel. Most scholars believe that the Books of Samuel contain a large amount of historical information, while there are some dissenters who view them as entirely fictional.

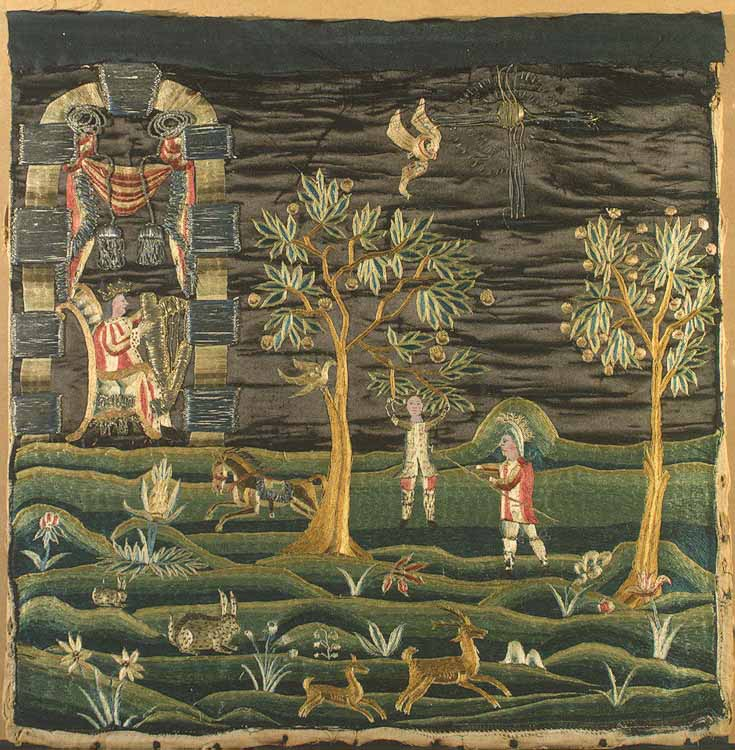
Relief of the death of Absalom

== Background ==
Absalom, the third son of King David of Israel, had been newly returned from three years in exile in Geshur for the murder of his half-brother, Amnon, and received a pardon with some restrictions. Later, he began a campaign to win the lost favour and trust of the people, which was successful. Absalom, under the pretense of going to worship at Hebron, asked King David permission to leave Jerusalem. David, unaware of his true intentions, granted it and Absalom left with an escort of 200 men. Upon arriving in the city, Absalom sent messengers to all the leaders and tribal princes throughout the empire to back him as king Meanwhile, back in Hebron he continued to sacrifice under the guise that he was only there to worship God while still gathering officials and important people in the empire, growing his numbers and strength, including receiving the support of Ahithophel of Giloh, one of the royal councilors. When news of Absalom's now open revolt in Hebron reached the royal Israelite court in Jerusalem, King David ordered the city and court evacuated, fearing that the rebel forces under Absalom would besiege. He left with the entire Israelite royal house, as well as his elite Cherethite/Pelethite Royal guard, a mercenary force of 600 Gathites under their commander Ittai the Gittite. They marched to the Kidron valley and came to the bank of the Jordan river. They crossed leaving behind several spies and double agents to subvert Absalom and his conspirators and infiltrate their court and gather information on the rebel movements.

== Location ==
The tribe of Ephraim is associated with land west of the Jordan River (Joshua 16), but David had retreated to a city east of the Jordan, Mahanaim, most likely to be identified with Tell adh-Dhahab ash-Sharqiyya on the south side of the Jabbok River. Most Bible geographers place the "Forest of Ephraim" east of the Jordan River, in the region also known as Gilead. This identification is bolstered by the statement that Absalom's army camped "in the land of Gilead" as they prepared for battle against David.

== Battle ==
Absalom initiated the attack with his forces. He chose Amasa, one of Joab's kinsmen, as general, and marched out of Jerusalem into the land of Gilead. When David entered Mahanaim with his forces, as a result of his fame many warriors flocked to his aid, and passed before him to the battle, as he stood at the gate of the city. David divided the army into three parts—one was to be led by Joab; one by Abishai; and the third by Ittai, the trusted friend and commander from Gath.

David then declared that he would head the army himself, but his soldiers would not allow David to risk his life. They asked him to remain in the city. When all was ready, David gave to the three Generals this parting injunction, "Deal gently, for my sake, with the young man, with Absalom." The two armies met in a forest of Ephraim. It was a great and terrible battle. The rebel forces were unable to maneuver because of the thickness of trees, and their numbers were reduced by the underbrush of the forest. The forces of Absalom were thus routed by the royal forces of David.

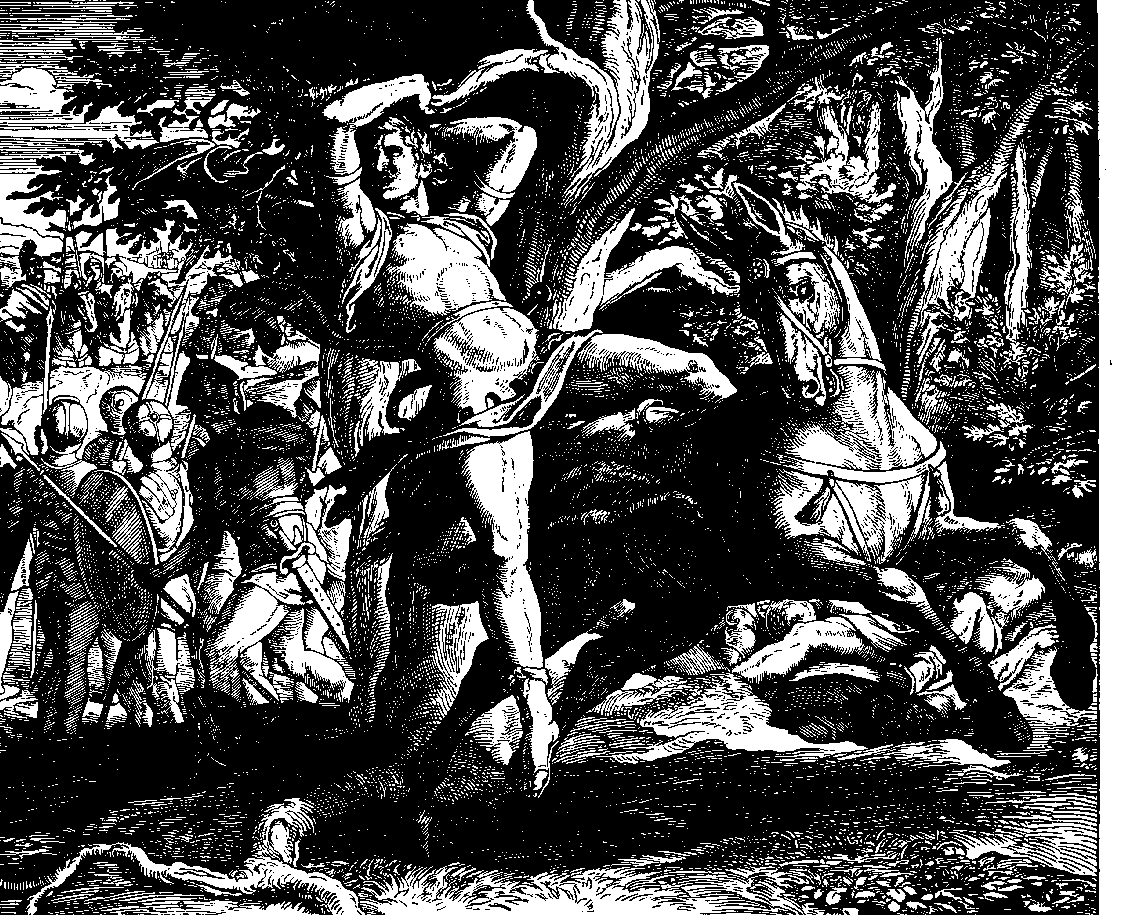
Death of Absalom, 1860 woodcut by Julius Schnorr von Karolsfeld

Absalom himself fled. As he was riding through the woods on his mule, he was caught by the long locks of his hair under the spreading branches of a large tree. Unable to free himself, he remained suspended, his mule had escaped. One of David's servants brought this intelligence to General Joab, who gave the order that Absalom be put to death and the royal troops disengaged immediately thereafter.

== See also ==
- List of Israelite civil conflicts
