= Hubert Skidmore =

American novelist

- Born: April 11, 1909; Webster Springs, West Virginia, U.S.
- Died: February 2, 1946 (aged 36); Dauberville, Pennsylvania, U.S.
- Education: University of Michigan
- Occupation: Novelist
- Writing career
- Genres: Social Protest, Juvenile Literature

Hubert Skidmore (1909–1946) was an American writer. His twin brother was novelist Hobert Skidmore, and he was married to the novelist Maritta Wolff, writer of Whistle Stop and a fellow student at the University of Michigan, in 1942. He died in a house fire in 1946. He is best known for his social protest novel Hawk's Nest, an account of the disaster at Gauley Bridge, West Virginia during the Great Depression.

Skidmore's novels divide into three groups. River Rising!, Hill Doctor and Hill Lawyer, which are juvenile literature, form a loose trilogy around York Allen, who works as a schoolteacher in a rough logging community to earn money for medical school, then returns as a doctor to treat the illnesses and injuries of the people of rural West Virginia.

I Will Lift Up My Eyes and its sequel Heaven Came So Near concern the difficult transition of the Cutlip family as they move from their isolated farm to live and work in a lumber camp.

Hawk's Nest chronicles the experience of a wide range of representative characters as they are touched by the Hawks Nest Tunnel disaster surrounding the construction of the Gauley Bridge tunnel.

== Major themes ==
All of Skidmore's novels take place in his native West Virginia, and his first five novels are deeply concerned with the travails of the "hill people" confronting environmental and economic pressures. In River Rising!, isolation, ignorance and poverty have contributed to the deaths by pneumonia of York Allen's parents, and he vows to become a doctor to help the farm families of the remote hollows of Appalachia. The Cutlip family of I Will Lift Up Mine Eyes live an idyllic life on their remote farm, but drought forces them off the land, and Mr. Cutlip takes work in the lumber camp.

The troubles of rural farm life are not mitigated by economic progress, however. As the lumber operations (and later, in Hill Lawyer, coal companies) become prevalent, quality of life diminishes. But the faceless corporations are not the only villains; greed and desperation make the small-time farmers and loggers prey on each other. The lumber camps are rough, dangerous places where family solidarity is challenged. At first the Cutlips prosper, but after Nat Cutlip is killed in a logging accident, his family suffers economic and social troubles. By the end of Heaven Came So Near, Maw Cutlip is reduced to a subsistence existence of combing the roadsides for edible weeds, and her remaining son, the talented misfit Ben, is murdered by a mob, unjustly accused of rape and murder.

Some of the characters in the Great Depression novel Hawk's Nest are rural West Virginians lured away from their farms by the large construction project at Gauley Bridge, building the tunnel and hydroelectric plant, but most come from other parts of the United States. Dust Bowl refugees, Southern blacks, Eastern European immigrants from the northeast and even former white collar workers ruined by the Depression converge, attracted by plentiful work and good wages. In the novel, as in the historical disaster, the supervisors and their managers and company doctors discount the health risks associated with breathing the silica dust created by digging and dynamiting the tunnel shaft, and most of the characters steadily weaken and die as their lungs are systematically ruined. As in Skidmore's other novels, particularly Heaven Came So Near and I Will Lift Up Mine Eyes, simple good people are crushed by economic and social forces far beyond their control.

Skidmore's novels are also highly ecological. Characters such as York Allen and Maw Cutlip are highly sensitive observers of nature, even travelling long distances through the night in complete comfort in the woods. They consider nature restorative, and their trips back to the woods or across the mountains to their ancestral farms alleviate the stress of social and economic conflict. Conversely, Skidmore is careful to describe as tragic environmental damage caused by logging and mining.

Skidmore's works include:

- Three-a-Day. (University of Michigan Plays, Book Two. George Wehr, Ann Arbor, 1930.)
- I Will Lift Up Mine Eyes (Doubleday, Doran & company, Garden City, N.Y., 1936)
- Heaven Came So Near (Doubleday, Doran & company, Garden City, N.Y., 1938)
- River Rising! (Doubleday, Doran & company, Garden City, N.Y., 1939) Illustrated by Benton Spruance.
- Hill Doctor (Doubleday, Doran & company, Garden City, N.Y., 1940)
- Hawk’s Nest (Doubleday, Doran & company, Garden City, N.Y., 1941)
- Hill Lawyer (Doubleday, Doran & company, Garden City, N.Y., 1942)

== Sources ==
- Douglas, Tom. Foreword. Hawk's Nest. Appalachian Echoes Series. Knoxville, University of Tennessee Press. 2004.
- Einstein, Frank H. "Things Fall Apart in Appalachia Too." Appalachian Journal Vol 11, nos 1–2. Autumn-Winter 1983–84. pp. 32–42.
- Waage, Fred. "Walking These Hills With Hubert: Topography, Inhabitation and Ecology in the Novels of Hubert Skidmore." Crossroads: A Southern Culture Annual. Ed. Ted Olson. Macon, GA, Mercer University Press. 2005. pp. 351–376.
