= The Book of the Dead (poem) =

1938 poem by Muriel Rukeyser

The Book of the Dead is a long narrative poem written by Muriel Rukeyser, appearing in her collection US 1. Published in 1938, the poem deals with the Hawks Nest Tunnel disaster (also known as the Gauley Tunnel Tragedy) in which predominantly poor, migrant mine workers in Gauley Bridge, West Virginia, were afflicted by the occupational mining disease silicosis.

Over the course of twenty poems, beginning with "The Road" and ending with "The Book of the Dead," Rukeyser takes her readers on a journey into the disaster. The poem mixes and intersperses, in a modernist and documentary manner, testimony from the disaster, lines from the ancient Egyptian Book of the Dead, and lines from the Biblical story of Absalom. The title emerges from the Egyptian text, with Rukeyser quoting or referencing the ancient work throughout.

There were various other influences on Rukeyser's poem; a key influence was "The Waste Land" by T. S. Eliot.

As part of her experiential research for the poem, Rukeyser visited Gauley Bridge with Nancy Naumburg in 1936.

Since its publication in 1938, The Book of the Dead has helped establish Rukeyser as an important twentieth century poet. It is a key example of the 1930s and 1940s tradition of documentary poetry and poetics, a tradition which documentary poetics practitioner Mark Nowak describes as "lefter-than-liberal."
