= The Man I Love (1947 film) =

1947 film by Raoul Walsh

- Theatrical release poster
- Directed by: Raoul Walsh
- Screenplay by: Catherine Turney; Jo Pagano (adaptation); Catherine Turney (adaptation)
- Based on: Night Shift; 1942 novel by Maritta Wolff
- Produced by: Arnold Albert
- Starring: Ida Lupino; Robert Alda; Bruce Bennett
- Cinematography: Sidney Hickox
- Edited by: Owen Marks
- Music by: Max Steiner
- Production company: Warner Bros. Pictures
- Distributed by: Warner Bros. Pictures
- Release date: January 11, 1947 (United States)
- Running time: 96 minutes
- Country: United States
- Language: English

The Man I Love is a 1947 American film noir melodrama directed by Raoul Walsh and starring Ida Lupino, Robert Alda, Andrea King and Bruce Bennett. Produced and distributed by Warner Bros. Pictures, the film is based on the novel Night Shift by Maritta M. Wolff. The title is taken from the George and Ira Gershwin song "The Man I Love", which is prominently featured.

== Plot ==
Homesick for her family in Los Angeles, lounge singer Petey Brown decides to leave New York City to spend some time visiting her two sisters and brother on the West Coast. Shortly she lands a job at the Long Beach nightclub of small-time-hood Nicky Toresca where her sister Sally is employed.

While evading the sleazy Toresca's heavy-handed passes, Petey falls in love with down-and-out ex-jazz pianist, legendary San Thomas, who has never recovered from an old divorce. Variously helping to smooth over or solve the problems of her sisters, brother and their next-door neighbor, the no-nonsense Petey must wait as San decides whether to start a new life with her or sign back on with a merchant steamer.

== Cast ==
- Ida Lupino as Petey Brown
- Robert Alda as Nicky Toresca
- Andrea King as Sally Otis
- Martha Vickers as Virginia Brown
- Bruce Bennett as San Thomas
- Alan Hale as Riley
- Dolores Moran as Gloria O'Connor
- John Ridgely as Roy Otis
- Don McGuire as Johnny O'Connor
- Craig Stevens as Bandleader
- Tony Romano as Bamboo Club singer
- William Edmunds as Uncle Tony
- Jimmie Dodd as Jimmy

== Production and reception ==
Warner Bros. purchased the rights to Maritta Wolff's novel Night Shift in 1942 for $25,000, with the original intention of casting Ann Sheridan and Humphrey Bogart in the film adaptation. Working titles for the film were Night Shift and Why Was I Born?, the latter a 1929 song by Jerome Kern and Oscar Hammerstein II which featured in the movie. Production fell behind schedule because Lupino was suffering from exhaustion – she fainted during one scene with Robert Alda and had to be cut out of her tight-fitting dress – finishing 19 days late and $100,000 over budget.

In a contemporary review in The New York Times Bosley Crowther characterized the film's mood as "both silly and depressing, not to mention dull".

When the movie started being distributed on television in 1956, 6 minutes were cut that were present in the original theatrically released version in order to avoid paying licensing costs for the 1929 song, "Bill", featured within the sequence. Until the 2024 Blu-ray release from Warner Archive, the 90-minute cut was what was distributed on home video and television.

The Man I Love later became Martin Scorsese's primary inspiration for his film New York, New York (1977).
