= Maritta Wolff =

American writer

Maritta Martin Wolff Stegman
- Born: Maritta Martin Wolff; December 25, 1918; Grass Lake, Michigan, U.S.
- Died: July 1, 2002 (aged 83); Los Angeles, California, U.S.
- Education: University of Michigan
- Occupations: Novelist, homemaker
- Writing career
- Genre: Hardboiled

Maritta Martin Wolff Stegman (December 25, 1918 – July 1, 2002) was an American author.

== Biography ==
Wolff was born on December 25, 1918, in Grass Lake, Jackson County, Michigan. She grew up on her grandparents' farm and attended a one-room country school. She was a senior at the University of Michigan when she wrote a novel-length story for an English composition class that won the 1940 Avery Hopwood Award, a university prize for excellent writing, worth $1,000. Whistle Stop is a seamy tale of the Veeches, a shiftless family living in a whistle-stop town near Detroit. The novel, depicting incest, violence, and containing much more vulgar language than was usual at the time, was published the next year by Random House. That Wolff, a mere 22-year-old, was the author of so hard-boiled a novel gave her an instant notoriety, and Whistle Stop became an immediate best-seller, going into five editions and a special Armed Services Edition. Yet the book was not without literary merit, Sinclair Lewis calling it "the most important novel of the year."

Whistle Stop was adapted into a 1946 film starring Ava Gardner and George Raft.

Wolff's second novel, Night Shift, attracted more critical praise, especially for its dialog. It was made into a movie in 1947 starring Ida Lupino and Robert Alda, with the title changed to The Man I Love. Over the next 20 years she wrote four more best-selling novels. Always a private person who shunned publicity, Wolff, in 1972, refused her publisher's request to go on a promotional tour for a recently finished novel, Sudden Rain, and as a result the novel was never published during her lifetime. At that point she evidently ceased writing fiction.

While at the University of Michigan she had met and married a prolific young writer, Hubert Skidmore, who published six novels before he was 30. Skidmore died in a house fire in 1946. In 1947 Wolff married a costume jeweller, Leonard Stegman, by whom she had a son, Hugh Stegman.

After Wolff's death, the manuscript for Sudden Rain, which had been kept safely in her refrigerator for the last thirty years of her life, was published (along with re-issues of Whistle Stop and Night Shift) to much acclaim.

== Publications ==
- Whistle Stop (Random House, N.Y.C., 1941). Made into a film in 1946 starring George Raft and Ava Gardner.
- Night Shift (Random House, N.Y.C., 1942). Made into the 1947 film The Man I Love starring Ida Lupino.
- About Lyddy Thomas (Random House, N.Y.C., 1947)
- Back of Town (Random House, N.Y.C., 1952)
- The Big Nickelodeon (Random House, N.Y.C., 1956)
- Buttonwood (Random House, N.Y.C., 1962)
- Sudden Rain (Scribners, N.Y.C., 2005)
