= Storming Heaven (Giardina novel) =

1987 novel by Denise Giardina

- Author: Denise Giardina
- Language: English
- Genre: Historical novel
- Publication date: 1987
- Publication place: United States
- Media type: Print (Hardback and Paperback)
- ISBN: 0-393-02440-7
- OCLC: 14413378
- Dewey Decimal: 813/.54 19
- LC Class: PS3557.I136 S76 1987
- Preceded by: Good King Harry
- Followed by: The Unquiet Earth

Storming Heaven is Denise Giardina's second novel. It was published in 1987 and won the W.D. Weatherford Award that year. It is a fictionalized account of the labor strife in the coalfields of southern West Virginia, United States during 1920 and 1921. It mainly takes place in the town of Annadel, which is based on the town of Keystone, West Virginia. Its events also have similarities to the Ludlow Massacre, which is mentioned in the book.

== Characters ==
=== The Marcum Family ===
C.J. Marcum - One of the main narrators. A leader of the union who is eventually elected mayor of Annadel.

Violet Marcum - C.J.'s wife.

Gladys Marcum Justice - C.J.'s eldest daughter.

=== The Lloyd Family ===
Rondal Lloyd - One of the main narrators. A surrogate son to C.J. Marcum, he becomes a fugitive after joining the union and witnessing a murder.

Talcott Lloyd - Rondal's younger brother. He marries Pricie Justice, and later gets involved with the union.

Kerwin Lloyd - Rondal and Talcott's youngest brother, who dies in a mine explosion.

Clabe Lloyd - Their father, who dies when a mine explodes.

Vernie Lloyd - Clabe's wife, who is very religious.

Dillon Lloyd Clabe's brother, who disappears when the coal operators begin to build the mines.

=== The Bishop Family ===
Carrie Bishop Freeman - One of the main narrators. A nurse who leaves her homestead to live in Annadel.

Miles Bishop - Carrie's elder brother, a coal operator.

Flora Bishop Honaker - Carrie's elder sister.

Orlando Bishop - Their father.

Ben Honaker - Flora's husband.

Aunt Jane - Both Carrie's great aunt and grandmother, a widow who lives with the rest of the family.

Aunt Becka - Carrie's paternal aunt, a spinster.

=== The Justices ===
Ermel Justice - Cousins with C.J.'s grandfather. A successful businessman.

Annadel Justice - His wife. Violet Marcum's second cousin.

Isom Justice - Their son, and one of Rondal Lloyd's closest friends. He marries Gladys Marcum.

Pricie Justice Lloyd - Their daughter and Talcott Lloyd's wife.

=== Other characters ===
Rosa Angelelli - One of the main narrators, and a housekeeper for one of the coal operators. An immigrant from Italy.

Dr. Booker - A black doctor who is one of the leaders of the union.

Albion Freeman - Carrie Bishop's husband. A hardshell baptist preacher and a pacifist who doesn't believe in Hell.

== Allusions ==
The following are historical references that appear in Storming Heaven.

- Henry Marcum refused to sign away mineral rights in a broad form deed.
- Ermel Justice preserves his mineral rights, but does sign away right-of-way.
- The "Richmond and Western Railroad" replaces the name of the Norfolk and Western Railway.
- Rondal Lloyd works on memorizing the Declaration of Independence for school.
- Uncle Alec is mentioned to be dead due to the "War Between the States" referring to the Civil War.
- A book of poems by John Keats is given to Flora.
- C.J. Marcum mentions how Jim Crow laws are not present in Annadel.
- Doc Boreman is said to be a graduate in medicine from Howard University.
- Doc claims that he belongs to the Socialist Party and reads the Appeal to Reason.
- Doc gives C.J. books by Karl Marx.
- C.J. claims to have voted for Eugene V. Debs.
- Rondal aims to bring the "United Mineworkers" to West Virginia, referring to the United Mine Workers of America.
- Baldwin-Felts Detectives appear numerous times in the novel as an opposing force to the union miners.
- Henry Ford is quoted by Rondal, "The machine is the new messiah."
- Eugene V. Debs and Mother Jones are wanted by Rondal to be mentors.
- C.J. details how the Annadel Political and Social Club that he begins attending discusses several events, figures, and organizations. The club began during the event of the Paint Creek-Cabin Creek Strike of 1912. Members would talk about Woodrow Wilson, the Niagara Convention, the Ku Klux Klan, and the Ludlow Massacre.
