= Adam Arcuragi =

American-born artist and producer

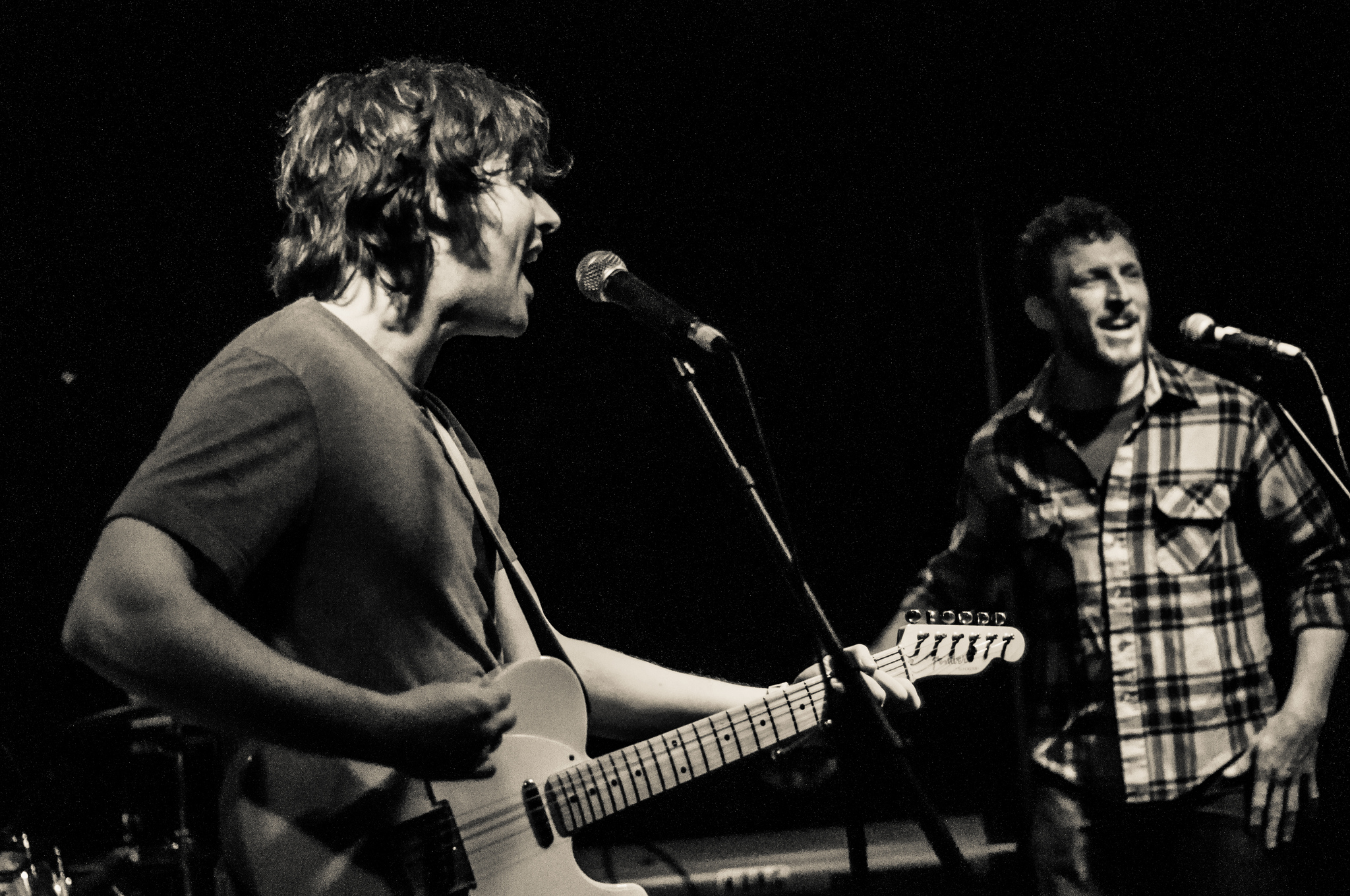
- Adam Arcuragi

Background information
- Origin: Atlanta, GA / Philadelphia, PA
- Labels: The Moon Recording Co., Thirty Tigers, High Two
- Members: Adam Arcuragi
- Past members: Charlie Hall, Jack Carter, David Hartley, Matt Luyk, Robbie Bennett, Maryanne Doman, Shaun Flemming
- Website: www.adamarcuragimusic.com

Adam Arcuragi is an American-born artist and producer from Georgia, who lived in Philadelphia, Pennsylvania, for many years. He is credited with being the founder of the musical genre Death Gospel.

Adam's debut album (untitled) was praised for his complex and often introspective lyrics and his voice garnered comparisons to Nick Drake and Van Morrison. Songs from the album were featured on stations and sites such as NPR's All Songs Considered. In 2008, Arcuragi recorded a La Blogotheque/Take-Away Show in New York City and the same year released his EP 'Soldiers For Feet'.

Arcuragi released his second full-length album titled I am become joy in September 2009. The album included collaborations with singer Dawn Landes, Jesse Elliott of These United States. The backing vocals on I Am Become Joy were meant to sound like that of a "ramshackle choir as though each song was tracked in a different church across the wide swath of Route 80 that cuts from southern Georgia to Mississippi".

"Like A Fire That Consumes All Before It" was released on January 31, 2012, on Thirty Tigers. The album premiered on NPR's "First Listen". Positive album reviews appeared on NPR, Paste, The Washington Post, The Huffington Post, Prefix, Impose, Time Out New York, The Portland Mercury and many others.

Arcuragi recorded an NPR Tiny Desk Concert with Bob Boilen, three Daytrotter Sessions, and toured extensively through the United States and Europe, under his name as well as with SPURS. Reviews, Interviews and articles appeared in Rolling Stone, Paste Magazine, American Songwriter, on NPR, in The L Magazine, Magnet, The Philadelphia Weekly and The Washington Post, The Austin Chronicle, The Guardian UK, Huffington Post and many others. He recorded a 78 Project that was featured on The BBC

Arcuragi has performed with legendary artists such as Ringo Starr and Eric Burdon (of The Animals), and has also co-written several songs with renowned songwriter Jeff Barry.

Since moving to LA in 2014, Adam's musical interests expanded into production and songwriting. He has produced, co-written and collaborated with artists and artists Sondre Lerche, Laura Burhen (Mynabirds), HOLLOVVS, Katt and Fabian Simon. Arcuragi has also written multiple songs for critically acclaimed shows such as SEARCH PARTY and THE PATH, and is one half of the project THE MOONLESS NIGHTS with Jesse Epstein.

He currently lives in Silver Lake, CA.

== Death Gospel ==
Death Gospel is a genre of music popularized by Arcuragi and his band. It draws from traditional Folk, Gospel and Soul music, Outlaw Country and the original old hymns and traditionals from the Southern United States, which are often characterized by their dominant vocals.

The focal point of the music is its rich lyrical content; containing messages or underlying themes that are meant to be understood and interpreted on multiple levels. The songs and instrumentation are considered a binding agent between humanity, which aims to connect them in common and spiritual way, as described by Paste Magazine. Other outlets and publications to write or discuss the genre include: NPR, American Songwriter, The Vinyl District, Stereo Subversion, Philadelphia Citypaper, and The Colorado Springs Independent, and mentions of it have been made on The Huffington Post (in an interview with Arcuragi), The DCist, and live on NPR's "All Songs Considered".

The name derives from the Old English “godspell” which translates as ‘bringing the good word or good news’. The theme of Death, serves as the common denominator of all human beings - the inevitable shared fate that makes life so wonderful, much like music itself; a celebration. In Arcuragi's own words (as published by the Huffington Post), the Death component and tie to the music is "anything that sees the inevitability of death as a reason to celebrate the special wonder that is being alive and sentient. That's the hope with the songs. . . . It is exciting that we can reflect upon it as intelligent life and do something to make that wonder manifest."

There has been some debate over the religious relevance of the genre's title. In February 2012, Professor M. Cooper Harriss of Virginia Tech published an article, in association with the University of Chicago School Of Divinity, about the Death Gospel genre and its connection to modern culture. In it, he concludes that "Death Gospel offers an interesting rejoinder to a culture that denies death and decay, insisting instead that particular individualities require a universal point of convergence; it addresses a generation of young adults (and their elders) who, despite their spirituality and electronic connections, feel alienated from their traditions (religious or otherwise), from their humanity, and from one another."

== Discography ==
Untitled (2006)
Soldiers for Feet EP (2008)
I am become joy (2009)
Like A Fire That Consumes All Before It... (2012)
Untitled Album (Forthcoming 2018)
