= Denise Giardina =

American writer

- Born: Bluefield, West Virginia
- Citizenship: United States
- Education: Master of Divinity
- Occupation: Novelist
- Notable work: Saints and Villains; Storming Heaven; Unquiet Earth

Denise Giardina is an American novelist. Her book Storming Heaven was a Discovery Selection of the Book-of-the-Month Club and received the 1987 W. D. Weatherford Award for the best published work about the Appalachian South. The Unquiet Earth received an American Book Award and the Lillian Smith Book Award for fiction. Her 1998 novel Saints and Villains was awarded the Boston Book Review fiction prize and was semifinalist for the International Dublin Literary Award. Giardina is an ordained Episcopal Church deacon, a community activist, and a former candidate for governor of West Virginia.

== Life ==
Giardina was born October 25, 1951, in Bluefield, West Virginia, and grew up in the small coal mining camp of Black Wolf, located in rural McDowell County, West Virginia, and later in Kanawha County, where she graduated from high school. Like the rest of the community, her family's survival was dependent upon the prosperity of the mine. Giardina's grandfather and uncles worked underground and her father kept the books for Page Coal and Coke. Her mother was a nurse. When the mine closed, her family moved to the state capital of Charleston. As a member of a coal-mining family, and growing up with a 1960s social consciousness, Giardina often found herself in political conflict with the people and culture around her.

Giardina received a BA in history from West Virginia Wesleyan College in 1973. She pursued graduate work at Marshall University in Huntington, West Virginia, and was preparing to go to law school. At this point, however, Giardina found a new spiritual home in the Episcopal Church, which she found to be more broad-minded than the fundamentalist Methodism of her childhood. Her pastor, Jim Lewis, provided reading suggestions that helped steer Giardina from law school to seminary: "I thought I was called to be ordained. I realized later I went because I needed that education for writing. [My books] are actually more theological than political." She received a Masters of Divinity from the Virginia Theological Seminary in Alexandria, Virginia, in 1979, was ordained as an Episcopal deacon, and returned to lead a church in the area of West Virginia where she grew up. However, she soon found herself in a conflict with superiors in the church due to her criticism of the coal companies, and left within a year. She moved to Washington, D.C., where she joined a peace campaign and lived communally with some radical Christians in an inner city outpost. This is when she began writing her first novel, Good King Harry. She later moved back to rural West Virginia for a while, then took a job as a congressional aide in Charleston. The novel eventually sold to Harper and Row, and was published in 1984.

As a political activist Giardina participated in and wrote about Appalachian labor-capital conflicts, including the A. T. Massey coal strike of the mid-1980s, and the Pittston coal strike of 1989–1990. In the following years she was vocal in her critique of surface mining and other environmental issues, particularly mountaintop removal coal mining. These issues informed her unsuccessful gubernatorial run in 2000. Giardina credits her mother and her upbringing in a conservative fundamentalist church for shaping her political sensibilities. Though she sought a more liberal religious setting later, her early church experience inculcated Giardina with basic values of charity and fairness that reinforced her mother's lessons on justice and tolerance. Her mother herself was not a fundamentalist, though many other family members and most of the surrounding community were, including Giardina's only brother.

In 2004 Giardina was the Writer-In-Residence at Hollins University and taught a course in Virginia and West Virginia fiction.

Giardina lives in Charleston and taught at West Virginia State University until 2015. In 2007 she was reinstated as an ordained deacon in the Episcopal Church.

Her papers, including notebooks, artifacts, correspondence, manuscripts, and family photos are held in the Archives & Manuscripts at West Virginia University's West Virginia & Regional History Center.

== Run for governor ==
The Mountain Party of West Virginia was born as a result of Charlotte Pritt's 1992 and 1996 candidacies for Governor of West Virginia. Giardina became the first statewide nominee of the new party in the 2000 general election. She received 10,416 votes, 1.61% of the vote, coming in third behind Democrat Bob Wise and Republican incumbent Cecil H. Underwood. Her platform included many of the environmental and miners' rights issues she worked on as an activist.

Giardina says that though her writing focused her emerging political views, it took the controversy over mountain top removal mining to move her to political action.

They have the nerve to say to us they should be allowed to destroy our mountains because they create jobs. The mafia creates jobs. The Colombian drug cartel creates jobs, pimps create jobs, and they're the same kind of jobs that destroy communities and even exploit the people that they employ. King Coal is dead. Long live the people of West Virginia.

— Living on Earth, October 13, 2000

According to Still journal, her "anti-mountaintop removal platform she became a folk hero and is often looked to as one of the primary commentators on the state of contemporary Appalachia".

== Writing career ==
In all of her books, Giardina is interested in the complexities and ambiguities of the individual destined to answer the call of his or her particular moment. Though largely recognized as an Appalachian writer, she has been defined, and defines herself, as primarily a theological writer. Giardina became interested in the Appallachian tradition of storytelling at an early age, and this oral literary heritage of the mountains informed much of her later work.

=== Good King Harry ===
Giardina began working on her first novel, Good King Harry, while living in Washington, D.C. She completed the book, told in the first-person voice of King Henry V, after returning to West Virginia. Unable to sell it, she took a class with visiting novelist George Garrett, who helped with revisions and also recommended Giardina to agent Jane Gelfman, who sold the novel to Aaron Asher at Harper & Row. Harry was published in 1984. Despite positive reviews, the novel sold poorly. Denise Giardina also wrote guest columns for The Charleston Gazette and submitted pieces to The Washington Post.

=== Coalfield novels ===
Her next novel, Storming Heaven, was published in 1987. In her previous work Giardina feared being pigeonholed as a "regional" writer, but this time she returned to her roots, setting the novel in the coalfields along the West Virginia–Kentucky border during the West Virginia Mine Wars. It covers the period 1890–1921, when coal miners fought to be unionized. The climax of the novel is based on the 1921 Battle of Blair Mountain, when U.S. Army troops marched on a small group of miners resisting to create a fledgling union. The mining camp Giardina spent her childhood in was less than 100 miles from Blair Mountain and served as the model for the town of Winco in the novel.

Giardina's 1992 novel, The Unquiet Earth, also explores life in the coalfields of West Virginia from the 1930s into the 1980s. Both books follow characters either fighting or accommodating King Cole, are written from the first-person perspective of several narrators, in regional dialect, enabling readers to clearly understand the characters' views of the United Mine Workers of America and the hope that they invest in the union. Some of the characters in The Unquiet Earth are descendants of those in Storming Heaven, and one, Jackie, is an alter-ego of Giardina herself. Giardina incorporates a diversity of portraits, not only of coal miners, but also of coal operators, politicians (local and national), and VISTA workers into the two stories. The novel also chronicles the coal mine operators' continual lack of concern for human life. This includes critical issues such as Coalworker's pneumoconiosis and culminates in a catastrophic flood at the novel's end —the author's fictionalization of the 1972 Buffalo Creek Disaster. Giardina also captures such aspects of life in Appalachia as religion and racism.

The decision to use dialect was costly for Giardina, leading her to scrap nearly 500 pages of the original 3rd-person manuscript of Storming Heaven. But she had realized that "the people had to tell their own stories". This novel also had trouble finding a publisher, but it did put Giardina on the "critical map" as it was very well received. Both coal-country novels were inspired in part by Wuthering Heights, with its rugged landscape and tales of women "who have this passion for a difficult man." Both books contain union organizers more committed to their cause than their lovers. Bonhoeffer, her next main character in Saints and Villains, also fits that pattern: "I guess in none of my books are the personal relationships real easy." Giardina also drew on local histories, childhood memories and even people she met in Eastern Kentucky, where she lived in a "hovel" while writing The Unquiet Earth and also volunteering for a citizens' group fighting strip mining. She moved to Durham, North Carolina, while still working on the novel, got a bookstore job, and studied with novelist Laurel Goldman at Duke University. The class helped Giardina recognize the value of what she had been doing intuitively and gave her the confidence to teach writing.

=== Saints and Villains ===
Another parallel between her characters and herself was the idea of needing to leave home in order to gain perspective on it. Having spent some time away while writing about West Virginia, Giardina moved back to Charleston, and took a job teaching at West Virginia State University. Both feeling more at home and experiencing more financial security, she began to work on her next novel, 1999's Saints and Villains. The book is a fictionalized retelling of the life of Dietrich Bonhoeffer, a German Lutheran pastor who opposed fascism, became involved in a plot to assassinate Hitler and was hanged by the Nazis for his theological principles.

The novel dwells upon moral decisions, most notably the acceptability of sin if the sin will prevent a greater evil. Giardina immersed herself in Bonhoeffer's life, attracted to the story because of the ambiguities of the situation. Grappling with the moral and theological struggles in the book also brought Giardina back to her church, in a journey to "live in God" that culminated with her being re-ordained in 2007. The novel is her first narrated in the third-person. In a mirror image of her experience with Storming Heaven, she began it in the first-person, and junked the first 50 pages in order to start over. She also decided to shift from past to present tense for the book's final scenes, adding suspense to the question of whether the imprisoned Bonhoeffer would be freed by the advancing Allies.

The title comes from a quote from Bonhoeffer: "Today there are once more saints and villains". She used lines from Mozart's Mass in C Minor to frame Bonhoeffer's saga and Germany's slide into Nazism and war, and the music's liner notes helped her build the character of SS officer Alois Bauer, a music lover who is a composite of Bonhoeffer's real interrogators. Some of the novels characters are real historical figures, others invented by Giardina. Some dates and events were moved around for the story's purposes.

Saints and Villains was awarded the Boston Book Review fiction prize and was semifinalist for the International Dublin Literary Award.

=== Later work ===
In Fallam's Secret, published in 2003, Giardina explores Appalachian magical realism within a time-travel murder-mystery. In 2009, Giardina published Emily's Ghost, a fictionalized biography of poet and novelist Emily Brontë. Both novels received warm, though not rave reviews. However, the fact that major national reviewer attended to her work was an achievement her previous, only-later more appreciated work, failed to accomplish.

In 2015, Giardina announced she was working on a memoir and a new novel, and noted that she had begun writing plays, though none had yet achieved production. Her Appalachian novels have been taught in university courses.

== Awards and recognition ==
- 2004 – Included on the West Virginia Literary Map, From A Place Called Solid: West Virginia and its Writers, from the West Virginia Folk Life Center at Fairmont State University.
- 2002 – Appalachian Heritage Writer-in-Residence at Shepherd University
- 2000 – Chaffin Award for Appalachian Writing from Morehead State University, Saints and Villains
- 1999 – Fisk Fiction Prize, Saints and Villains
- 1999 – Boston Book Review Fiction Prize, Saints and Villains
- 1997 – West Virginia Library Association Literary Merit Award
- 1996 – National Endowment for the Arts grant
- 1993 – American Book Award, The Unquiet Earth
- 1992 – Weatherford Award for Significant Appalachian Work, Fiction, Unquiet Earth
- 1992 – Lillian Smith Book Award, Storming Heaven
- 1988 – Appalachian Book of the Year, Storming Heaven
- 1988 – National Endowment for the Arts grant
- 1987 – Weatherford Award for Significant Appalachian Work, Fiction, Storming Heaven

== Bibliography ==
- Emily’s Ghost. New York: Norton, 2009.
- Fallam's Secret. New York: Norton, 2003.
- Saints and Villains. New York: Fawcett, 1998.
- Unquiet Earth. New York: Norton, 1992.
- Storming Heaven. New York: Random House, 1987.
- Good King Harry. New York: Harper, 1984.

As a contributor:

- Backcountry: Contemporary Writing in West Virginia, Irene McKinney (Editor). Morgantown [W.Va.]: Vandalia Press, 2002.
- Bloodroot: Reflections on Place by Appalachian Women Writers, Joyce Dyer (Editor); Univ Pr of Kentucky, 1997.

== Popular culture ==
- Giardina appeared in the West Virginia Public Broadcasting documentary Mountaineer, alongside Charles Blevins and Clyde Case. The film explores West Virginia culture and folklore.

== Critical works about Denise Giardina ==
In March 2020, George Fox University professor William Jolliff's book Heeding the Call: A Study of Denise Giardina's Novels was published by West Virginia University Press. In the book, Jolliff dedicates a chapter to each of the writer and activist's novels, examining them from three perspectives: Regional, political, and theological. He analyzes her use of history and writing technique, as well as delving into the themes of significance in each of her works. He concludes that though her writing is largely informed by her own religious beliefs, Giardina never provides theological answers to the issues raised in her very political fiction; rather, she pushes both characters and readers to confront and wrangle with ever more complex and challenging moral and philosophical questions.
