= Muriel Rukeyser =

American poet and essayist (1913–1980)

- Rukeyser in 1945
- Born: December 15, 1913; New York City
- Died: February 12, 1980 (aged 66); New York City
- Citizenship: American
- Education: Ethical Culture Fieldston
- Alma mater: Vassar College, Columbia University
- Occupations: poet, essayist, biographer, screenwriter, novelist, critic
- Children: William L Rukeyser
- Relatives: Rebecca Rukeyser
- Writing career
- Subjects: equality, feminism, motherhood, sexuality, social justice, anti-fascism, ecology, visual and cultural theory
- Website: murielrukeyser.org

Muriel Rukeyser (December 15, 1913 – February 12, 1980) was an American poet, essayist, biographer, novelist, screenwriter, and political activist. She wrote across genres and forms, addressing issues related to racial, gender, and class justice, war and war crimes, Jewish culture and diaspora, and American history, politics, and culture. Kenneth Rexroth said that she was the greatest poet of her "exact generation." Anne Sexton famously described her as "beautiful Muriel, mother of everyone"; Adrienne Rich wrote that she was “our twentieth-century Coleridge; our Neruda."

One of Rukeyser's most powerful pieces was the long poem The Book of the Dead (1938), which documented the details of the Hawks Nest Tunnel disaster, an industrial disaster in which hundreds of miners died of silicosis.

== Early life ==
Muriel Rukeyser was born December 15, 1913, to Lawrence and Myra Lyons Rukeyser. Her family was Jewish, and the family's heroes were "the Yankee baseball team, the Republican party, and the men who built New York City." Her father was the co-founder and president of the Colonial Sand and Stone Company and Muriel enjoyed a relatively privileged upbringing. She attended the Ethical Culture Fieldston School, a private school in The Bronx, and in 1930, at age 16, she enrolled at Vassar College. She began her career as a journalist there, serving as a contributing editor to Vassar Miscellany News. Her father's business went bankrupt in 1932, however, and she was forced to drop out before completing her degree.

Rukeyser's literary career began in 1935 when her book of poetry Theory of Flight was chosen by the American poet Stephen Vincent Benét for publication in the Yale Younger Poets Series. In an autobiographical statement written during World War II, she claims "poetry and fire" as her primary influences.

== Personal life ==
Rukeyser never spoke publicly about her sexuality, but had relationships with men and women throughout her life. Her literary agent, Monica McCall, was her partner for decades. She was briefly married in 1945 to Glyn Collins, a painter from New Zealand. In 1947, she gave birth to her only child, William Rukeyser, whose father was not the man she had married.

In 1936, Rukeyser traveled to Spain to cover the People's Olympiad for the literary journal Life and Letters when the Spanish Civil War broke out. During her five-day stay, Rukeyser fell in love with Otto Boch, a German communist athlete who volunteered to fight the fascists and was later killed. One experience was evoked in her long poem sequence, "Letter to the Front" (1944), which includes "To be a Jew in the Twentieth Century."

Rukeyser died of a stroke on February 12, 1980, at age 66, in New York, with diabetes as a contributing factor.

== Activism, teaching, and writing ==
Rukeyser was one of the great integrators, seeing the fragmentary world of modernity not as irretrievably broken, but in need of societal and emotional repair.

— Adrienne Rich, Essays on Art in Society: A Human Eye

Rukeyser was active in progressive politics throughout her life.

=== 1930 to 1940 ===
In 1933, she traveled to Scottsboro, Alabama to learn more about a case involving two white women, Ruby Bates and Victoria Price, who accused nine black boys of rape in 1931. The case had become known nationally as the Scottsboro case and the boys as the Scottsboro boys. Eight of the boys were convicted, even though the case lacked substantive, physical evidence.

Ultimately, the case was appealed to the U.S. Supreme Court, which ordered new trials. Rukeyser's task was to cover the boys' appeal trial. She was working for the International Labor Defense, which handled the defendants' appeals, and writing for the Student Review, a journal of the National Student League.

On her journey south, Rukeyser remembers seeing slogans posted: “There is terror in Alabama,” “Free the Scottsboro boys.” She also believed that this case extended beyond the immediate issue; it was linked to the problems of women in the workplace.

During her visit in Scottsboro, local police detained her after seeing her talk with Black reporters. Rukeyser documented that detention and concluded that “women must help in the fight to free the Scottsboro Boys as well as help to solve the problems that led to their trial.”

Several years later, in 1936, Rukeyser traveled to Gauley Bridge, West Virginia, with filmmaker and photographer Nancy Naumburg. They had met during the trip to Scottsboro as students. For this trip, they wanted to investigate what was a major industrial accident: the deaths and recurring silicosis among miners from their work in the Hawks Nest Tunnel. Initially, they planned a joint work, but it did not materialize.

However, Rukeyser did publish the documentary poem The Book of the Dead in her volume U.S. 1 (1938). This work covered the tragedy, its after-effects, and the court proceedings. Rukeyser said, in an interview, that her intent was to “write a series of poems linked together like the sequences in a movie are linked together.”

Rukeyser also wrote for the Daily Worker and a variety of publications including Decision and Life & Letters Today, for which she was assigned to cover the People's Olympiad (Olimpiada Popular, Barcelona), the Catalan government's alternative to the Nazis' 1936 Berlin Olympics. Instead of reporting on the Olympiad, she witnessed the first days of the Spanish Civil War, an experience that she would describe as a "moment of proof." This formed the basis of her rediscovered autobiographical novel Savage Coast and the long poem Mediterranean.

With World War II on the horizon, she published A Turning Wind (1939). In it, she seems to draw upon her experiences during the Spanish Civil War and look ahead to the turmoil in Europe, as in poems such as "Correspondences." She also adds a section entitled Lives, in which she has poems about some of the individuals she later writes biographies about, such as Willard Gibbs.

Rukeyser did not shy away from strong social or political positions. Even before the U.S. entered the conflict, she spoke to a group at Vassar College about how poetry can be “a kind of weapon that can best meet these enemies, the outer cloud, the stealthy inner silence of fear” (1a, emphasis original).

=== 1940 to 1950 ===
Her poem "To be a Jew in the Twentieth Century" (1944), on the theme of Judaism as a gift, was adopted by the American Reform and Reconstructionist movements for their prayer books - something Rukeyser said "astonished" her, as she had remained distant from Judaism throughout her early life.

Rukeyser published two volumes of poetry in the late 1940s: The Green Wave (1948), Elegies (1949). In The Green Wave, she writes more about the intersections of anti-fascism, birth, feminism, and the poetic process. Given that the war's ending was still fresh, and she gave birth to her first and only child, William, these themes are clearly tied to her life and the world. The book was nominated for the Library of Congress's inaugural Bollingen Prize.

In 1949, Rukeyser published Elegies, a cycle of ten poems written over a seven-year period from the end of the Spanish Civil War to the start of the Cold War. Two scholars, Jan Heller Levi and Christoph Keller, wrote in an introduction to a republished version, that the poems presented "no angelic orders, only the difficulties of living in the modern world."

During and after World War II, she gave a series of lectures, titled The Usable Truth, on art and politics in times of crisis. These were eventually published (1949) as The Life of Poetry. In it, Rukeyser makes the case that poetry is critical for democracy, essential to human life and understanding. In a publisher's note, Jan Freeman, the founder of Paris Press, called it a book that "ranks among the most essential works of twentieth-century literature." In 1996, Paris Press reissued The Life of Poetry, which had fallen out of print since its 1949 publication.

=== 1950 to 1960 ===
From the end of the war through the period of McCarthyism, Rukeyser was the target of sexist literary and political attacks, which affected her career trajectory and publishing opportunities, and the FBI compiled a thick file on her as a suspected Communist.

Rukeyser taught university classes and led writing workshops for much of her life, but never became a career academic.[1] She worked at Sarah Lawrence College, California Labor School, and served on the Board of Directors of the Teachers-Writer's Collective.

=== 1960 and beyond ===
In the 1960s and 1970s, when Rukeyser presided over PEN America, her feminism and opposition to the Vietnam War drew a new generation to her poetry. The title poem of her final book, The Gates, is based on her unsuccessful attempt to visit Korean poet Kim Chi-Ha on death row in South Korea. In 1968, she signed the "Writers and Editors War Tax Protest" pledge, vowing to refuse to pay taxes in protest against the Vietnam War.

In addition to poetry, she wrote a fictionalized memoir, The Orgy, plays, among them the musical Houdini, and screenplays. She also translated work by Octavio Paz and Gunnar Ekelöf. She wrote biographies of Josiah Willard Gibbs, Wendell Willkie, and Thomas Hariot. In the early 1970s, Andrea Dworkin worked as her secretary. Also in the 1970s, Rukeyser served on the Advisory Board of the Westbeth Playwrights Feminist Collective, a New York City-based theatre group that wrote and produced plays on feminist issues.

== In other media ==
In the television show Supernatural, the angel Metatron quotes an excerpt from Rukeyser's poem "Speed of Darkness": "The Universe is made of stories, not of atoms."

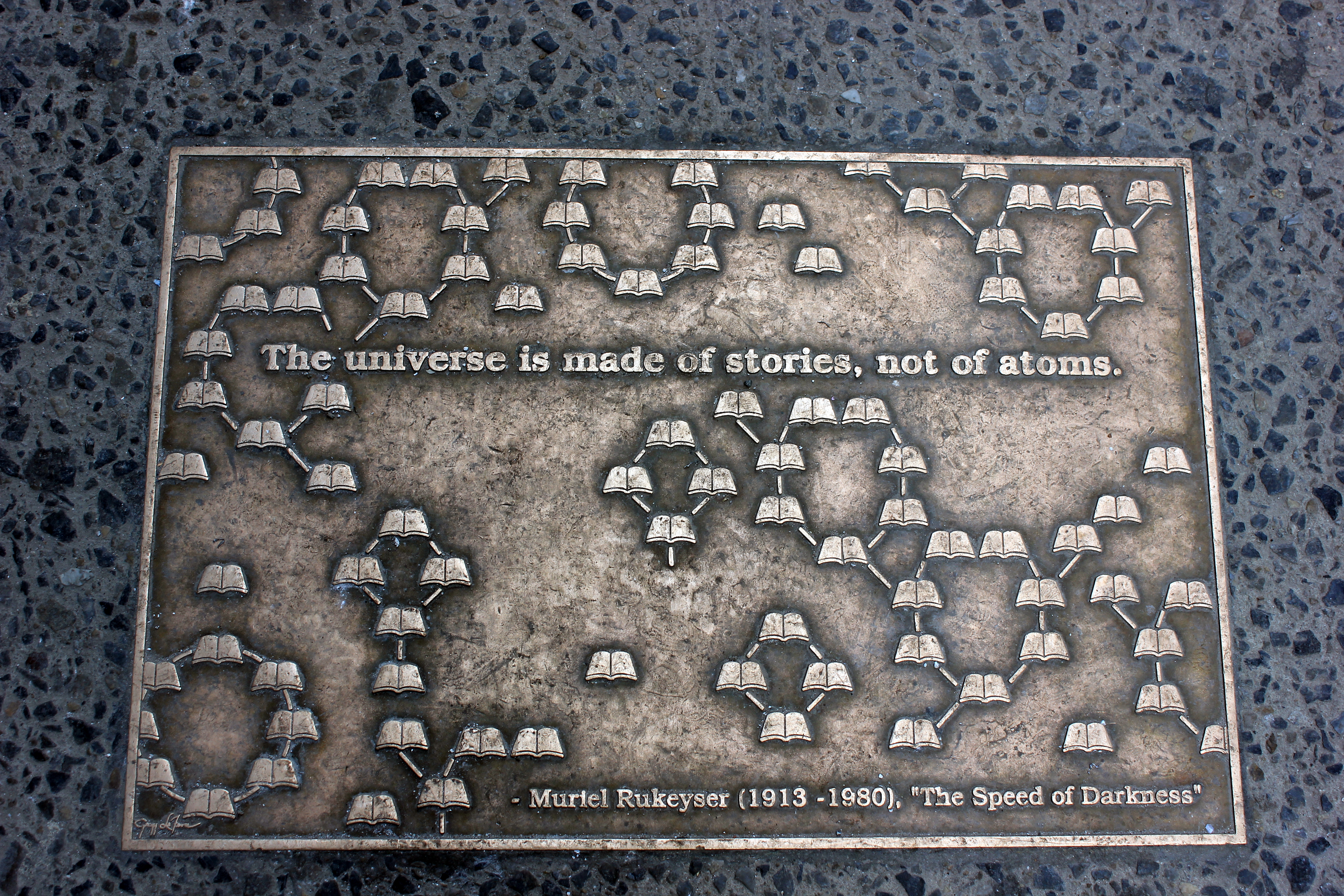
Speed of Darkness

Jeanette Winterson's novel Gut Symmetries (1997) quotes Rukeyser's poem "King's Mountain."

Rukeyser's translation of "Aqua Nocturna," a poem by Octavio Paz, was adapted by Eric Whitacre for his choral composition "Water Night."

John Adams set one of her texts in his opera Doctor Atomic. Adams used words from the following poems: "Easter Eve 1945," "Three Sides of a Coin," "The Motive of All of It," "Seventh Elegy, Dream Singing Elegy," and "Ninth Elegy, the Antagonists."

Libby Larsen set the poems "Looking at Each Other" in her choral work Love Songs (1997); she used some of Rukeyser's poetry for Love after 1950 in (2000); she set "Look! Be: leap;" to music in 2014; "The Children's Orchard" to music in 2016.

Writer Marian Evans and composer Chris White collaborated on a play about Rukeyser, Throat of These Hours, titled after a line in Rukeyser's Speed of Darkness. JNT: Journal of Narrative Theory dedicated a special issue to Rukeyser in Fall 2013.

Rukeyser's 5-poem sequence "Käthe Kollwitz" (The Speed of Darkness, 1968, Random House) was set by Tom Myron in his composition "Käthe Kollwitz for Soprano and String Quartet," "written in response to a commission from violist Julia Adams for a work celebrating the 30th anniversary of the Portland String Quartet in 1998."

Rukeyser's poem "Gunday's Child" was set to music by the experimental rock band Sleepytime Gorilla Museum, for their album Of Natural History (2004).

David Kelley used The Book of the Dead as the basis for a work in 2022.

== Awards ==
- Copernicus Prize
- Harriet Monroe Poetry Award (the first)
- Guggenheim Fellowship
- Levinson Prize
- Yale Younger Poets Award (1935) with Theory of Flight

== Works ==
Rukeyser's original collections of poetry

- Theory of Flight. Foreword by Stephen Vincent Benet. New Haven: Yale Uni. Press, 1935. Won the Yale Younger Poets Award in 1935.
- Mediterranean. Writers and Artists Committee, Medical Bureau to Aid Spanish Democracy, 1938.
- U.S. 1: Poems. Covici, Friede, 1938.
- A Turning Wind: Poems. Viking, 1939.
- The Soul and Body of John Brown. Privately printed, 1940. With etchings by Rudolph von Ripper.
- Wake Island. Doubleday, 1942.
- Beast in View. Doubleday, 1944.
- The Green Wave: Poems. Garden City, NY: Doubleday, 1948. Includes translations of Octavio Paz's poems.
- Orpheus. Centaur Press, 1949. With the drawing "Orpheus" by Picasso.
- Elegies. New Directions, 1949.
- Selected Poems. New Directions, 1951.
- Body of Waking: Poems. NY: Harper, 1958. Includes translated poems of Octavio Paz.
- Waterlily Fire: Poems 1935-1962. NY: Macmillan, 1962.
- The Outer Banks. Santa Barbara, CA: Unicorn, 1967. 2nd rev. ed., 1980.
- The Speed of Darkness: Poems. NY: Random House, 1968.
- 29 Poems. Rapp & Whiting, 1972.
- Breaking Open: New Poems. Random House, 1973.
- The Gates: Poems. NY: McGraw-Hill, 1976.
- The Collected Poems of Muriel Rukeyser. University of Pittsburgh Press, 2005.

Fiction by Rukeyser

- Savage Coast : A Novel. Feminist Press, 2013.

Plays by Rukeyser

- The Middle of the Air. Produced in Iowa City, IA, 1945.
- The Colors of the Day: A Celebration of the Vassar Centennial. Produced in Poughkeepsie, NY, at Vassar College, June 10, 1961.
- Houdini. Produced in Lenox, MA, at Lenox Arts Center, July 3, 1973. Published as Houdini: A Musical, Paris Press, 2002.

Film written by Rukeyser

- All the Way Home. Produced in New York City, NY, 1957.

Children's books

- Come Back, Paul. Harper, 1955.
- I Go Out. Harper, 1961. Illustrated by Leonard Kessler.
- Bubbles. Harcourt, Brace & World, 1967.
- Mazes. Simon & Schuster, 1970. Photography by Milton Charles.
- More Night. Harper & Row, 1981. Illustrated by Symeon Shimin.

Memoirs by Rukeyser

- The Orgy: An Irish Journey of Passion and Transformation. London: Andre Deutsch, 1965; NY: Pocket Books, 1966; Ashfield, MA: Paris Press, 1997.

Works of criticism by Rukeyser

- The Life of Poetry. NY: Current Books, 1949; Morrow, 1974; Paris Press, 1996.

Biographies by Rukeyser

- Willard Gibbs: American Genius, 1942. Reprinted by the Ox Bow Press, Woodbridge CT. Biography of Josiah Willard Gibbs, physicist.
- One Life. NY: Simon and Schuster, 1957. Biography of Wendell Willkie.
- The Traces of Thomas Hariot. NY: Random House, 1971. Biography of Thomas Hariot.

Translations by Rukeyser

- Selected Poems of Octavio Paz. Indiana University Press, 1963. Rev. ed. published as Early Poems 1935-1955, New Directions, 1973.
- Sun Stone. Octavio Paz. New Directions, 1963.
- Selected Poems of Gunnar Ekelöf. With Leif Sjöberg. Twayne, 1967.
- Three Poems. Gunnar Ekelöf. T. Williams, 1967.
- Uncle Eddie's Moustache. Bertolt Brecht. Pantheon Books, 1974.
- A Molna Elegy: Metamorphoses. Gunnar Ekelöf. With Leif Sjöberg. 2 volumes. Unicorn Press, 1984.

Edited collections of Rukeyser's works

- The Collected Poems of Muriel Rukeyser. McGraw, 1978.
- Out of Silence: Selected Poems. Edited by Kate Daniels. Triquarterly Books, 1992.
- A Muriel Rukeyser Reader. Norton, 1994.
- The Collected Poems of Muriel Rukeyser. University of Pittsburgh Press, 2005.
- The Muriel Rukeyser Era: Selected Prose. Eds. Eric Keenaghan and Rowena Kennedy-Epstein. Cornell University Press, 2023.

== See also ==
- Women Writers Project
- Jewish Women
