= Susan Osborn (writer) =

American writer, editor and scholar

Susan Osborn, Ph.D., is an American writer, educator, and cultural critic whose work focuses on gender, literature, and systemic power structures. Her scholarship examines how familial, social, and institutional systems shape what women are allowed to know and express about their bodies.

== Biography ==
Osborn's book, She's Such a Liar: Incest, Knowledge & Power, was published by Shake the Table Press in 2026.

Much of her scholarly work focuses on modern British and Irish culture, history, and literature, though she is renowned as an Elizabeth Bowen scholar. Her book on Bowen is Elizabeth Bowen: New Critical Perspectives. She served as guest editor for Purdue University's scholarly journal, Modern Fiction Studies, (Summer 2007) issue, which was a Special Issue devoted exclusively to the work of Elizabeth Bowen. She contributed the introduction to that edition and an essay titled "Reconsidering Elizabeth Bowen."

Osborn's novel, Surviving the Wreck, was published in 2001.

In addition to her work at the Writing Center of Princeton, a privately operated writing and college counseling business, she also taught fiction writing, business writing, and English at Rutgers University as a professor. Earlier in her tenure at Rutgers, she served as research director and development coordinator for the New Jersey Center for Research on Writing. She has published several articles in the field of composition and rhetoric, including "Revision/Re-vision" in Rhetoric Review.

== Works ==
- Surviving the Wreck (2001)
- Elizabeth Bowen: New Critical Perspectives (2009), Cork University Press
- She’s Such a Liar: Incest, Knowledge & Power (2026), Shake the Table Press
