= Tamar (daughter of David) =

Princess of ancient Israel

- Princess of Israel
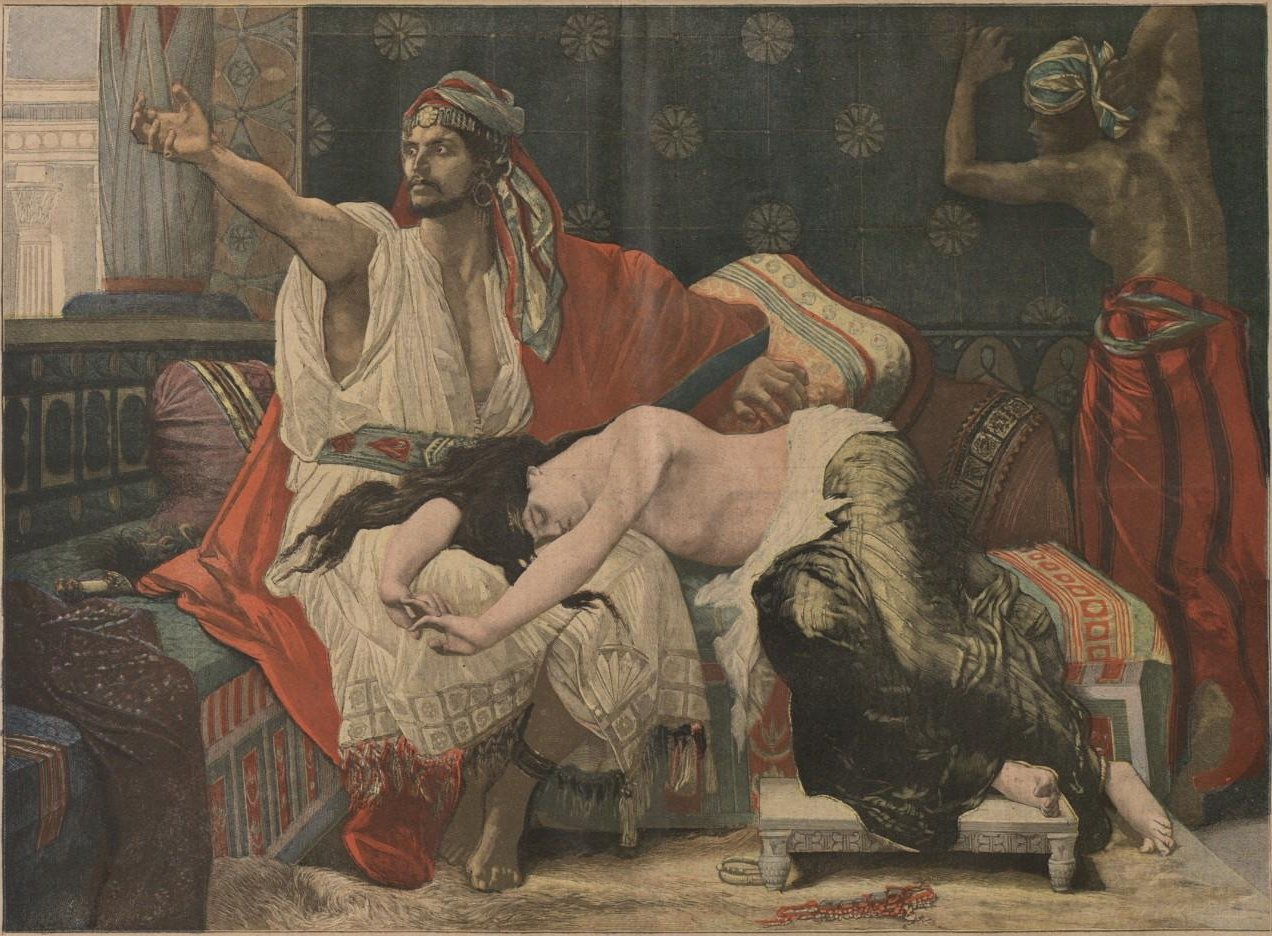
- Thamar and Absalon (1875) by Alexandre Cabanel
- Born: c. 1000 BCE; Judah, Kingdom of Israel
- Died: Unknown
- Hebrew: תָּמָר
- Dynasty: House of David
- Father: David ben Yishai
- Mother: Maacah bat Talmai

Tamar (Hebrew: [taˈmaʁ]; Biblical Hebrew: תָּמָר, lit. 'date') was an Israelite princess. Born to David and Maacah, who was from Geshur, she was the only full sibling of Absalom. She is described in the Hebrew Bible as being exceptionally beautiful, as is her brother. In the narrative of 2 Samuel 13, she is raped by her paternal half-brother Amnon (born to David and Ahinoam of Jezreel) before fleeing with torn robes to Absalom's house; David is angered by the incident, but does nothing, as Amnon is his heir apparent. Absalom, infuriated by the rape and David's inaction, keeps Tamar in his care and later assassinates Amnon to avenge her, subsequently fleeing to Geshur, which is ruled by his and Tamar's maternal grandfather Talmai. Three years later, he returns to Israel and leads an armed revolt against the House of David, but is killed by David's nephew and army commander Joab during the Battle of the Wood of Ephraim. Tamar is described as being left "a desolate woman in her brother's house" and the sole guardian of her orphaned niece, who is also named Tamar.

== Early life and family ==
Tamar's mother, Maacah, was the daughter of Talmai, king of Geshur. Her only full sibling was Absalom. The Hebrew Bible does not speak of Tamar's early life; however, in 2 Samuel 13, she is wearing a "richly ornamental robe [...] for this is how the virgin daughters of the king were clothed in earlier times." Her half-brother Amnon, by whom she was raped, was the son of Ahinoam, who was from Jezreel.

== Events of 2 Samuel 13 ==
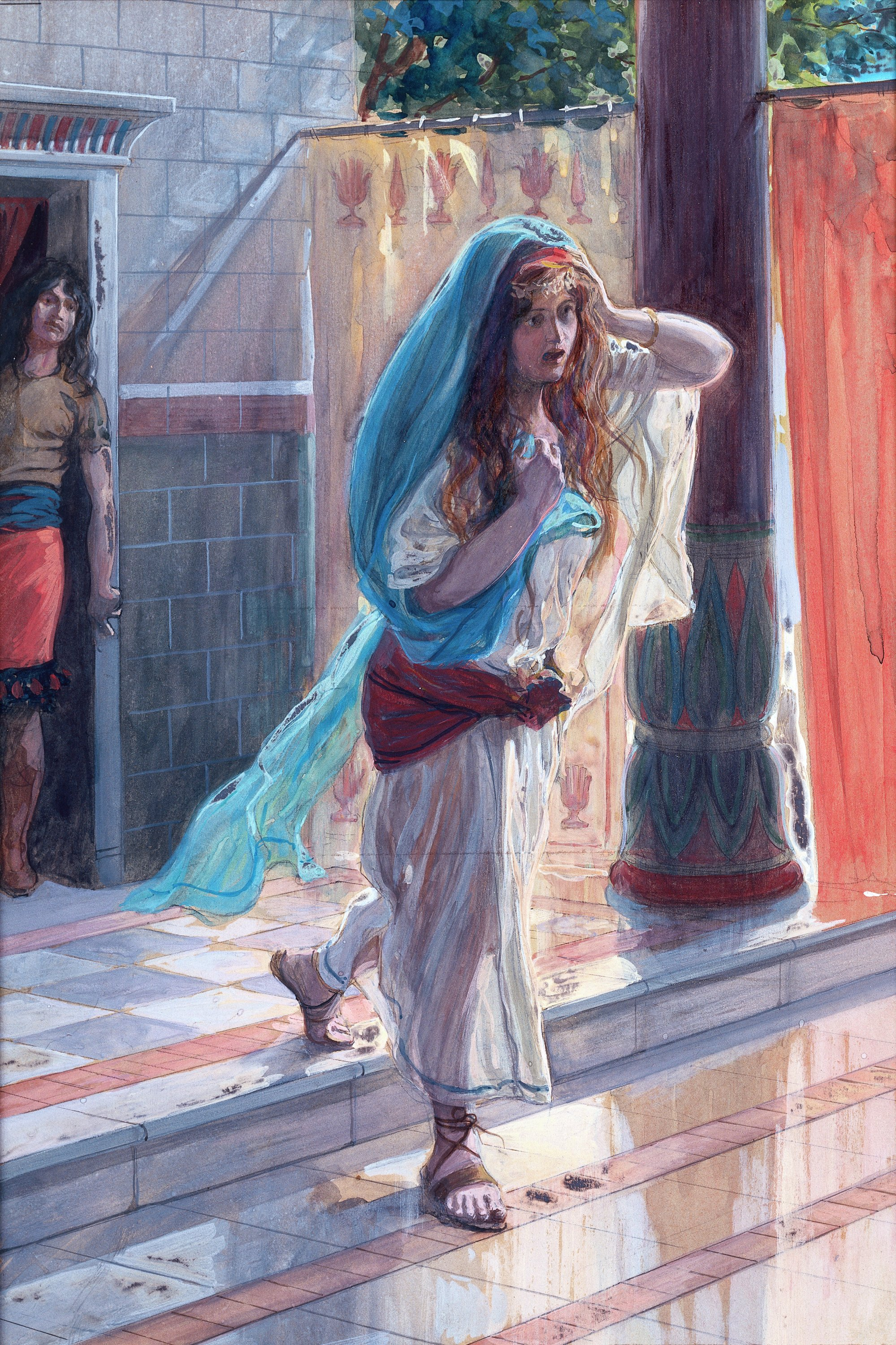
Desolation of Tamar (c. 1896–1902) by James Tissot

=== Tamar is raped by Amnon ===
During Tamar's teenage years, Amnon becomes extremely obsessed with her. Having devised a ruse, he acts on the advice of his cousin Jonadab and feigns illness, asking David to call Tamar to prepare a meal for him. In David's absence, when she comes into Amnon's room, he sends his servants away and begins pressing her for sex. She refuses, citing the Law, but as "he was stronger than she, he raped her." After intercourse, Amnon becomes angry with Tamar and assaults her. She pleads that he marry her to preserve her reputation, but he forces her out. A hysterical Tamar tears her robes and leaves crying, and news of the rape begins spreading throughout David's royal household.

=== Tamar flees to Absalom's house ===
When David hears of Tamar's rape, he is angered, but does nothing, as Amnon is his heir apparent, owing to his status as David's first-born son. Absalom, receiving his sister at his house, is infuriated when she informs him of her rape at the hands of Amnon. He comforts her and keeps her at his house, vowing to avenge her.

=== Absalom murders Amnon and flees to Geshur ===
Two years after Tamar's rape, Absalom invites all of David's other sons to a grand feast, subsequently ordering his servants to murder Amnon once he is drunk. Following Amnon's death, Absalom flees to Geshur, where his maternal grandfather Talmai is reigning as king. Tamar continues to stay at Absalom's house while he is in exile.

=== Absalom wages a failed war against David ===
Three years later, Absalom returns to Israel and begins rallying popular support against David in Jerusalem. A war ensues as Absalom's rebels mobilize at Hebron and begin fighting David's army in an attempt to overthrow him. However, the revolt fails when Absalom is killed by David's army commander Joab during the Battle of the Wood of Ephraim.

=== Tamar's later life ===
Upon the death of her brother, Tamar becomes the sole guardian of her niece, who is also named Tamar. The Bible mentions that Tamar was left "a desolate woman in her brother's house"; she was grieved and traumatized by her rape. Nothing is known of her later life and death.

== Rabbinic literature ==
The sages of the Mishnah point out that Amnon's love for Tamar, his half-sister, did not arise from true affection but lust. After having attained his desire, he immediately "hated her exceedingly." "All love which depends upon some particular thing ceases when that thing ceases; thus was the love of Amnon for Tamar" (Ab. v. 16). Amnon's love for Tamar was not, however, such a transgression as is usually supposed: for, although she was a daughter of David, her mother was a prisoner of war, who had not yet become Jewish; consequently, Tamar also had not entered the Jewish community (Sanh. 21a). The sages utilized the incident of Amnon and Tamar as affording justification for their rule that a man must on no account remain alone in the company of a woman, not even of an unmarried one (Sanh. l.c. et seq.).

According to the Babylonian Talmud, Amnon hated Tamar because, as he raped her, Tamar tied one of her hairs around Amnon's penis and used it to castrate him. The Babylonian Talmud also asserts that Amnon's death was a punishment from the Lord for Amnon's "lewdness".

The sages of Israel are quick to point out that Tamar was born from David's union with a beautiful captive woman, and that her mother conceived of her during the first act of copulation, in which case, the mother had not yet converted to Judaism and the child born was considered a non-Jew and required a conversion to the Jewish religion. Although Amnon and Tamar had the same biological father, they were not considered bona-fide siblings and could actually marry each other, as she was a proselyte to the Jewish religion. For this reason, Tamar insisted that their father would not withhold her from him (2 Samuel 13:13).

== Scholarly discussion ==
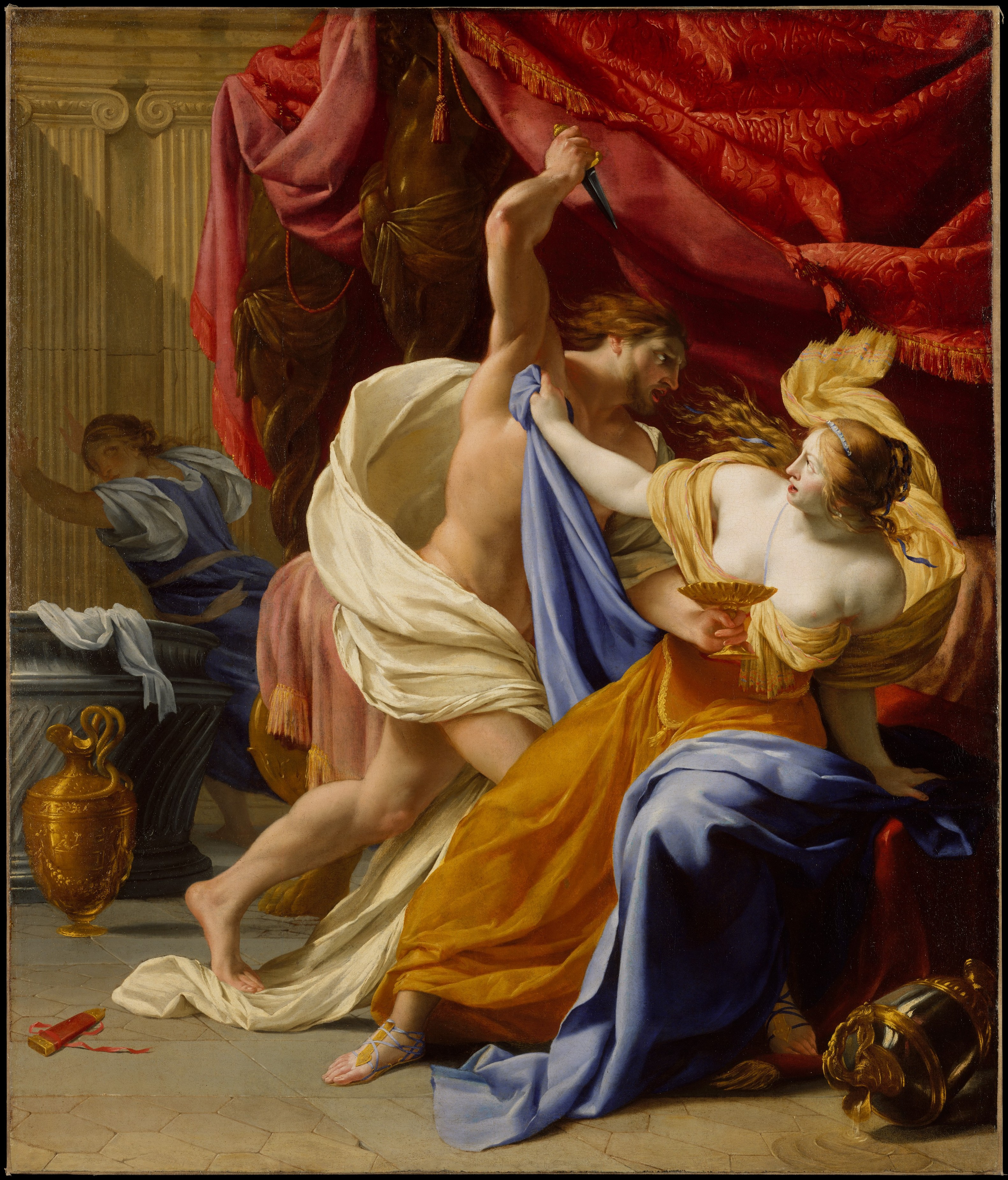
The Rape of Tamar (Note: This image may be instead an image of Tarquin and Lucretia (which see); the slave in the image is female but male in the Lucretia legend, but, on the other hand, the dagger is not a part of the Tamar legend.) (c. 1640) by Eustache Le Sueur

Michael D. Coogan attributes the placement of the rape of Tamar narrative, coming soon after the Bathsheba narrative, as a way for the narrator to compare Amnon to David. As David wronged Bathsheba, so too will Amnon wrong Tamar, "like father like son." Mark Gray, however, disagrees with Coogan on this point, arguing that "the rape of Tamar is an act of such horrific defilement that it is marked off as distinct from David's encounter with Bathsheba."

Mary J. Evans describes Tamar as a "beautiful, good-hearted, obedient, righteous daughter who is totally destroyed by her family." After the rape, Amnon attempted to send Tamar away. She responded "No, my brother; for this wrong in sending me away is greater than the other that you did to me" (2 Samuel 13:15–16).

In Biblical law, it was unlawful for a man to have intercourse with his sister. Rav says that Tamar was not, by Biblical law, David's daughter, nor Amnon's sister. Tamar was the earlier born daughter of David's wife, and thus not biologically related to David, nor Amnon. Coogan says that, according to the Bible, it was possible for Amnon to marry Tamar. Kyle McCarter suggests that either the laws are not in effect at this time or will be overlooked by David, or they do not apply to the royal family.

Coogan, in his section on women in 2 Samuel, describes Tamar as a "passive figure" whose story is "narrated with considerable pathos." Coogan also points out the poignancy of the image at the end of the narrative story where Tamar is left as a "desolate woman in her brother Absalom's house" (2 Samuel 13:20). It is thought that this ending verse about Tamar is meant to elicit compassion and pity for her.

Adrien Bledstein says the description of Tamar as wearing a "richly ornamented robe" may have been meant to signify that she was a priestess or interpreter of dreams, like Joseph with his coat of many colors.

== Literary references ==
- Georg Christian Lehms, Des israelitischen Printzens Absolons und seiner Prinzcessin Schwester Thamar Staats- Lebens- und Helden-Geschichte (The Heroic Life and History of the Israelite Prince Absolom and his Princess Sister Tamar), novel in German published in Nuremberg, 1710
- The Spanish poet Federico García Lorca wrote a poem about Amnon's rape of his sister Tamar, included in Lorca's 1928 poetry collection Romancero Gitano (translated as Gypsy Ballads). Lorca's version is considerably different from the Biblical original – Amnon is depicted as being overcome by a sudden uncontrollable passion, with none of the cynical planning and premeditation of the original story. He assaults and rapes Tamar and then flees into the night on his horse, with archers shooting at him from the walls – whereupon King David cuts the strings of his harp.
- The Rape of Tamar, novel by Dan Jacobson (ISBN 1-84232-139-0)
- The Death of Amnon, poem by Elizabeth Hands
- Yonadab, play by Peter Shaffer (1985, revised 1988; ISBN 978-0-14048-218-8)
- In Stefan Heym's 1973 "The King David Report", the East German writer's wry depiction of a court historian writing an "authorized" history of King David's reign, a chapter is devoted to the protagonist's interview with Tamar – who is described as having gone insane as a result of her traumatic experience.
- La venganza de Tamar (Tamar's Revenge), theater play by Spanish author Tirso de Molina.
- In the novel The Book of Tamar by Nel Havas, the revolt of Absalom is presented from the viewpoint of his sister. While closely following the main events as related in the Bible, Havas concentrates on the motives behind Absalom's actions, which are more complex than depicted in the scriptures. The rape of his sister is used by him as a cause celebre in his ambition to advance himself.

== See also ==
- Women in the Bible
- Rape in the Bible
- Sex in the Bible
- Incest in the Bible
- Thamar (Cabanel)
