= Incest in the Bible =

Incest - sexual relations between close relatives - as described in the Bible

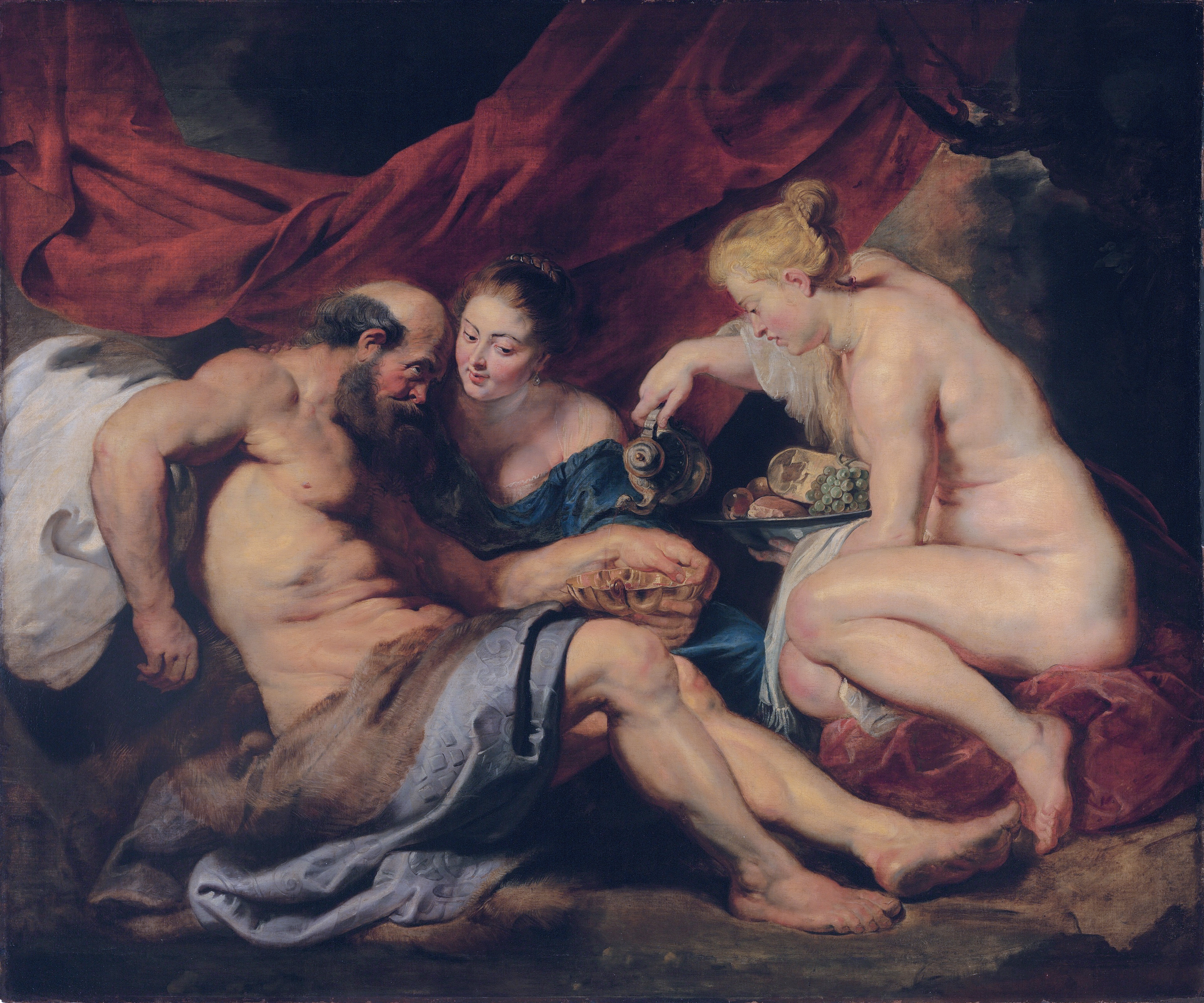
Lot and his daughters, by Peter Paul Rubens (c. 1613-14)

Narratives featuring incest can be found in the Hebrew Bible, which contains mentions of various types of sexual relationships. It also lays out rules and regulations with regard to prohibited degree of kinship. These prohibitions are found predominantly in Leviticus 18:7–18 and 20:11–21, but also in Deuteronomy.

Endogamy was the preferred practice in many parts of the ancient Near East; the ideal marriage, in fact, was usually one to a cousin, and it was often forbidden for an eldest daughter to even marry outside of the family at all. Other endogamous relationships, namely avunculate marriages and sibling marriages, while considered incestuous by most of the world today, were also common among a number of ancient Eastern societies, such as that of Ancient Egypt and Ancient China.

Biblical commentary on human sexual behaviour is less critical for events that are described as taking place before the Law of Moses was issued by God to the Israelites. For example, the Book of Genesis discusses the marriage of Abraham and Sarah without criticizing Abraham's claim that they were half-siblings, and the Book of Samuel treats the marriage of a royal prince to his half-sister as simply unusual, rather than wicked.

== Instances ==
The Hebrew Bible mentions a number of instances in which marriage and sexual intercourse occurs between close kin, mostly dated to before the Sinai period:

- In Genesis 9:20–27, Ham saw his father Noah's nakedness. The Talmud suggests that Ham may have sodomized Noah (Babylonian Talmud Sanhedrin 70a). In more recent times, some scholars have suggested that Ham may have had intercourse with his father's wife.
- Abraham's brother Nahor married his niece Milcah, the daughter of his other brother Haran.
- Living in an isolated area after the destruction of Sodom and Gomorrah, the two daughters of Lot conspired to inebriate and seduce their father due to the lack of available sexual partners. Because of intoxication, Lot "perceived not" when his first-born daughter, and the following night his younger daughter, lay with him. (Genesis 19:32–35) The two children born were directly Lot's sons and indirectly his grandsons, being his daughters' sons. Likewise, their sons were also half-brothers (between them and with their mothers), having the same father, as well as cousins, having mothers that were sisters.
- In one of the tales of a wife confused for a sister, Abraham states that his wife Sarah is his half-sister—the daughter of his father, but not his mother. However, in rabbinic literature, Sarah is considered Abraham's niece (the daughter of his brother, Haran).
- Marriage of cousins was common in the pre-Sinai period. Abraham's son Isaac married Rebekah, his first cousin once removed, the granddaughter of his father Abraham's brother Nahor with Milcah.
- Isaac and Rebekah's firstborn son Esau resorted to marrying his cousin Mahalath, daughter of his father's brother Ishmael because his parents did not approve of him having relationships with Canaanites.
- Isaac and Rebekah's second son Jacob married his cousins Leah and Rachel, who were daughters of his mother's brother Laban. Leah and Rachel were sisters; a wife's sister is also forbidden.
- Jacob's firstborn son Reuben had sex with his father's concubine Bilhah.
- Judah, Jacob's fourth son, mistook his daughter-in-law Tamar for a prostitute while she was veiled, and had sex with her.
- Amram married his paternal aunt Jochebed, the mother of Miriam, Aaron, and Moses. However, according to the Septuagint, she was his cousin.
- Amnon, King David's eldest son and heir to the throne, raped his half-sister Tamar. Tamar's brother, Absalom, learned of the incident and, two years later, ordered his servants to have Amnon killed. In vain with Amnon, Tamar said, "Now therefore, I pray thee, speak unto the king; for he will not withhold me from thee".
- Absalom, son of King David, in the middle of a rebellion against his father, had sex with his father's concubines on the roof inside a tent.
- Rehoboam, son of Solomon and Naamah, married Maacah daughter of Absalom. 2 Samuel 14:27 does not list Maacah as a daughter of Absalom, but Absalom seems to have had sex with the wives of David, his father, at the advice of Ahitophel.
- Zelophehad's daughters, Mahlah, Tirzah, Hoglah, Milcah, and Noah, married their cousins on their father's side to obey the Lord's command. The Lord said: "no inheritance shall be transferred from one tribe to another".
- Caleb said, "I will give my daughter Acsah in marriage to the one who attacks and captures Kiriath-sepher." Othniel, son of Caleb's brother Kenaz, was the one who conquered it, so Acsah became Othniel's wife.

== Prohibited relationships ==
Leviticus 18:7–11 and 20:11–21 sets out lists of prohibited relationships, and two chapters later specifies punishments for such unions, but the second list of unions is much shorter than the first. Critical scholars regard the lists as having originally been independent documents, bound together at a later point. The Deuteronomic Code gives a yet more simple list of prohibited relationships – a man's parent's daughter (including his sister), a man's father's wife (including his mother), and a man's mother-in-law. In the Hebrew Bible, sexual relationships between siblings are forbidden to Jews but permissible to Gentiles (non-Jews).

The relationships prohibited by Leviticus 18 are:

- One's mother (Leviticus 18:7)
- One's father (Leviticus 18:7)
- One's stepmother (Leviticus 18:8)
- One's paternal or maternal sister (Leviticus 18:9)
- One's paternal sister through one's father's wife (Leviticus 18:11)
- One's daughter (inferred from Leviticus 18:10)
- One's granddaughter (Leviticus 18:10)
- A woman and her daughter (Leviticus 18:17)
- A woman and her granddaughter (Leviticus 18:17)
- One's aunt by blood (Leviticus 18:12–13)
- One's father's brother (uncle) (Leviticus 18:14)
- One's father's brother's wife (aunt) (Leviticus 18:14)
- One's daughter-in-law (Leviticus 18:15)
- One's brother's wife (sister-in-law) (Leviticus 18:16), with the exception of Yibum
- One's wife's sister (sister-in-law) during one's wife's lifetime, even if since divorced (Leviticus 18:18)

Also cousins are not included in the lists of prohibited relationships, so was not considered incest.

The lists of prohibited relationships can be summarised as follows (the relations highlighted in red are those that are prohibited):

Familial relation			Leviticus 18	Leviticus 20	Deuteronomy
Grandfather's wife (including grandmother)					
Father's wife		Mother			
Father's wife		Stepmother			
Mother-in-law					
Aunt	Parent's sister				
Aunt	Uncle's wife	Father's brother's wife			
Aunt	Uncle's wife	Mother's brother's wife			
Parent's daughter	Half-sister (on the mother's side)				
Parent's daughter	Father's daughter	Sister			
Parent's daughter	Father's daughter	Half-sister (on the father's side)			
Step sister					
Sister-in-law (except in case of Levirate marriage)					
Niece					
Wife's daughter		Daughter			
Wife's daughter		Stepdaughter			
Daughter-in-law					
Wife's child's daughter (including granddaughter)					

One of the most notable features of each list is that sexual relations between a man and his own daughter is not explicitly prohibited. Although the first relation mentioned after the Levitical prohibition of sex with "near kin" names that of "thy father", it must be taken into account that the Hebrew original text only addresses male Jews with regard to their female relatives. The Talmud argues that the absence is because the prohibition was obvious, especially given the proscription against a relationship with a granddaughter, although some biblical scholars have instead proposed that it was originally in the list, but was then accidentally left out from the copy on which modern versions of the text ultimately depend, due to a mistake by the scribe. The second list in the Holiness code noticeably differs from the first by not including the closer relatives, and it might be assumed that obviousness is the explanation here as well. One might argue that the explicit prohibition against engaging in sexual activity with a woman as well as with her daughter, implicitly forbids sexual activity between a man and his daughter. However, the rationale might suggest otherwise (the original text is unclear here), since it mentions only that "they" (i.e., the woman and the daughter) are related. John Calvin did not consider the father-daughter-relation to be explicitly forbidden by the Bible, but regarded it as immoral nevertheless.

Apart from the case of the daughter, the first incest list in Leviticus roughly produces the same rules as applied in early (pre-Islamic) Arabic culture; in Islam, these pre-Islamic rules were made statutory.

Ezekiel implies that, in his time, marriage between a man and his stepmother, or his daughter-in-law, or his sister, were frequent. This situation seems to be the target of the Deuteronomic version of the incest prohibition, which only addresses roughly the same three issues (though prohibiting the mother-in-law in place of the daughter-in-law). Early rabbinic commentators instead argue that the Deuteronomic list is so short because the other possible liaisons were obviously prohibited, and these three were the only liaisons difficult to detect, as, in their day, a man's stepmother, half-sister, and mother-in-law usually lived in the same house as the man (prior to any liaison).

=== Sex-specific rules ===
The biblical lists are not symmetrical – the implied rules for women are not the same – they compare as follows:

Forbidden for men only
Forbidden for women only
Forbidden for both men and women

Familial relation			Leviticus 18	Leviticus 20	Deuteronomy
Grandparent's spouse (including other grandparent)					
Parent's spouse		Parent			
Parent's spouse		Stepparent			
Parent-in-law					
Uncle/Aunt	Parent's sibling				
Uncle/Aunt	Uncle's/Aunt's spouse	Father's sibling's spouse			
Uncle/Aunt	Uncle's/Aunt's spouse	Mother's sibling's spouse			
Parent's child	Half-sibling (on the mother's side)				
Parent's child	Father's child	Sibling			
Parent's child	Father's child	Half-sibling (on the father's side)			
Step-sibling					
Sibling-in-law (if the spouse was still alive)					
Nephew/Niece	Sibling's child				
Nephew/Niece	Nephew/Niece-in-law	Spouse's brother's child			
Nephew/Niece	Nephew/Niece-in-law	Spouse's sister's child			
Spouse's child		Child			
Spouse's child		Stepchild			
Child-in-law					
Spouse's grandchild (including grandchild)					

== See also ==
- Jewish views on incest
- Levirate marriage
- Sex in the Hebrew Bible
- Forbidden relationships in Judaism
- Karaites
- Incest
- Affinity (Catholic canon law)
- Legality of incest
