= Jonadab =

Character in 2 Samuel; son of Shimeah

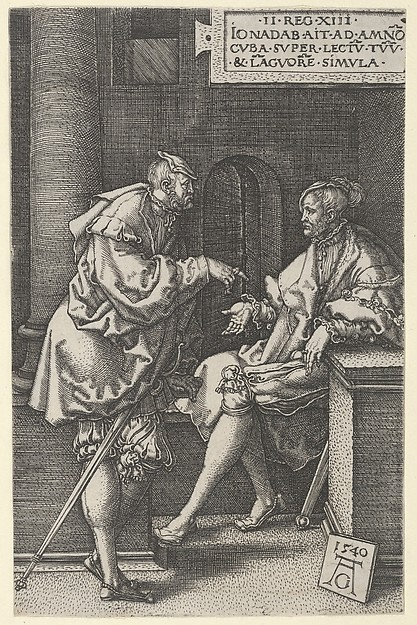
Jonadab (right) with Amnon in a woodcut by Heinrich Aldegrever, 1540.

Jonadab is a figure in the Hebrew Bible, appearing in 2 Samuel 13. He is described in verse 3 as the son of Shimeah, who was the brother of David, making Jonadab a cousin to Amnon as well as his friend. He is called "very wise" (ḥākām mĕ'ōd), usually translated as "very shrewd" (NIV) or "very crafty" (ESV).

2 Samuel 13 describes how Amnon wanted to have Tamar, despite the fact that she was his half-sister. Jonadab advised Amnon to pretend to be sick, and then ask David to send Tamar to him to make him some food. Amnon followed Jonadab's advice, and ended up raping Tamar.

Jonadab appears again at the end of the chapter, when he tells David of Absalom's grudge against Amnon. Pamela Tamarkin Reis notes that he was "privy to the confidence of both brothers", and suggests that he "told Absalom about Amnon's scheme simply because he was a busybody, stirring his spoon in every pot."

According to the Babylonian Talmud: "And Thou should not associate with a sinner:....And so we find with Amnon, who associated with Jonadab, the son of Shim'ah, David's brother; and Jonadab was a very sensible man--sensible in wickedness, as it is written [Jer. Iv .22]: Wise are they to do evil." According to others, it is meant that one shall not associate with the wicked, even to study the Torah."

Keith Bodner suggests that "among the numerous minor characters in 2 Samuel 11–19, Jonadab remains among the most enigmatic, and his malignancy marks a key juncture in the story."
