= Sex in the Hebrew Bible =

The Hebrew Bible's views on sex

Sex is mentioned repeatedly in the Hebrew Bible. Some references provide unambiguous ethical regulations, such as the laws given in Leviticus or Deuteronomy. Others are more ambivalent, most famously the potentially homosexual actions of Ham with his father, Noah. Its depictions of homosexuality, rape, prostitution and incest have spurred considerable academic and theological attention.

== Homosexuality ==
The Hebrew Bible possibly refers to homosexuality three times, though the word itself does not occur in many English translations. These passages are interpreted differently. Leviticus 18:22 says:

"You shall not lie with a male as with a woman; it is an abomination."

Leviticus 20:13 says:

"If a man lies with a male as with a woman, both of them have committed an abomination; they shall be put to death; their bloodguilt is upon them."

Some recent interpretations focus on the passage's context as part of the Holiness code, a purity code meant to discern the behavior of the Israelites from the polytheistic Canaanites, and not as a catch-all condemnation of same-sex sexual activity. (Note: The Hebrew Bible only prohibits this practice for men. This is clearly seen by contrasting these verses with Lev. 18:23 and 20:15-16 respectively, where sex with animals is prohibited for both men and women.)

Ham's actions in Genesis 9:20–25 possibly refer to homosexual behavior with his father Noah, while the latter was passed out drunk in his tent.

== Rape ==
Although the Hebrew Bible contains numerous references to rape, this was mostly unrecognized by commentators until the 20th century. It was not until the late 1970s, with the emergence of the anti-rape movement due to second-wave feminism, that feminist scholars reanalyzed Biblical scenarios in terms of sexual violence. Hebrew contains several verbs that can refer to rape, making interpretation difficult.

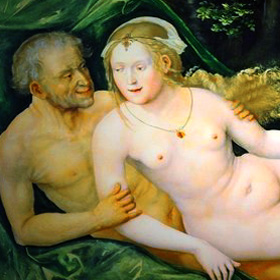
The Biblical character Lot slept with his own daughters.

A commonly-cited example of Biblical rape is the Levite's concubine found in Judges.

== Incest ==
Lot's daughters had sex with him after they got him drunk for the purpose of becoming pregnant.

== Prostitution ==
Two different words for prostitute occur in the Hebrew Bible, zonah (זונה) and kedeshah (קדשה). This led to the belief that kedeshah were not ordinary prostitutes, but sacred harlots who worked in fertility temples.

- Tamar (Genesis) traded sex with her father-in-law Judah for ownership of a goat. Her motive was fulfilling what she saw as her family duty, namely producing offspring for Judah.
- Samson sees a prostitute, and visits her.
- God tells the prophet Hosea to marry Gomer, a prostitute.
- Deuteronomy 23:17–18 prohibits cult prostitution.

== Adultery ==
Exodus 20:14, as the seventh commandment, prohibits adultery. Second Samuel 11:3–5 describes King David's act of adultery with Bathsheba:

3 David sent someone to inquire about the woman. It was reported, “This is Bathsheba daughter of Eliam, the wife of Uriah the Hittite.” 4 So David sent messengers to get her, and she came to him, and he lay with her. (Now she was purifying herself after her period.) Then she returned to her house. 5 The woman conceived, and she sent and told David, “I am pregnant.”

== Miscellaneous ==
- The sin of Onan, often misinterpreted as masturbation, was coitus interruptus. Onan was also violating the duty of yibbum. He was struck down by God because he "spilt his seed upon the ground" while he had a duty to impregnate his brother's wife.
- Proverbs 5 claims that sexual sin causes scars and pain.
- It has been argued that multiorgasmic encounters in Biblical episodes as understood in rabbinic literature reflect the use of sex as a display of power.

== See also ==
- Religious male circumcision
