= Amnon =

- Prince of Israel
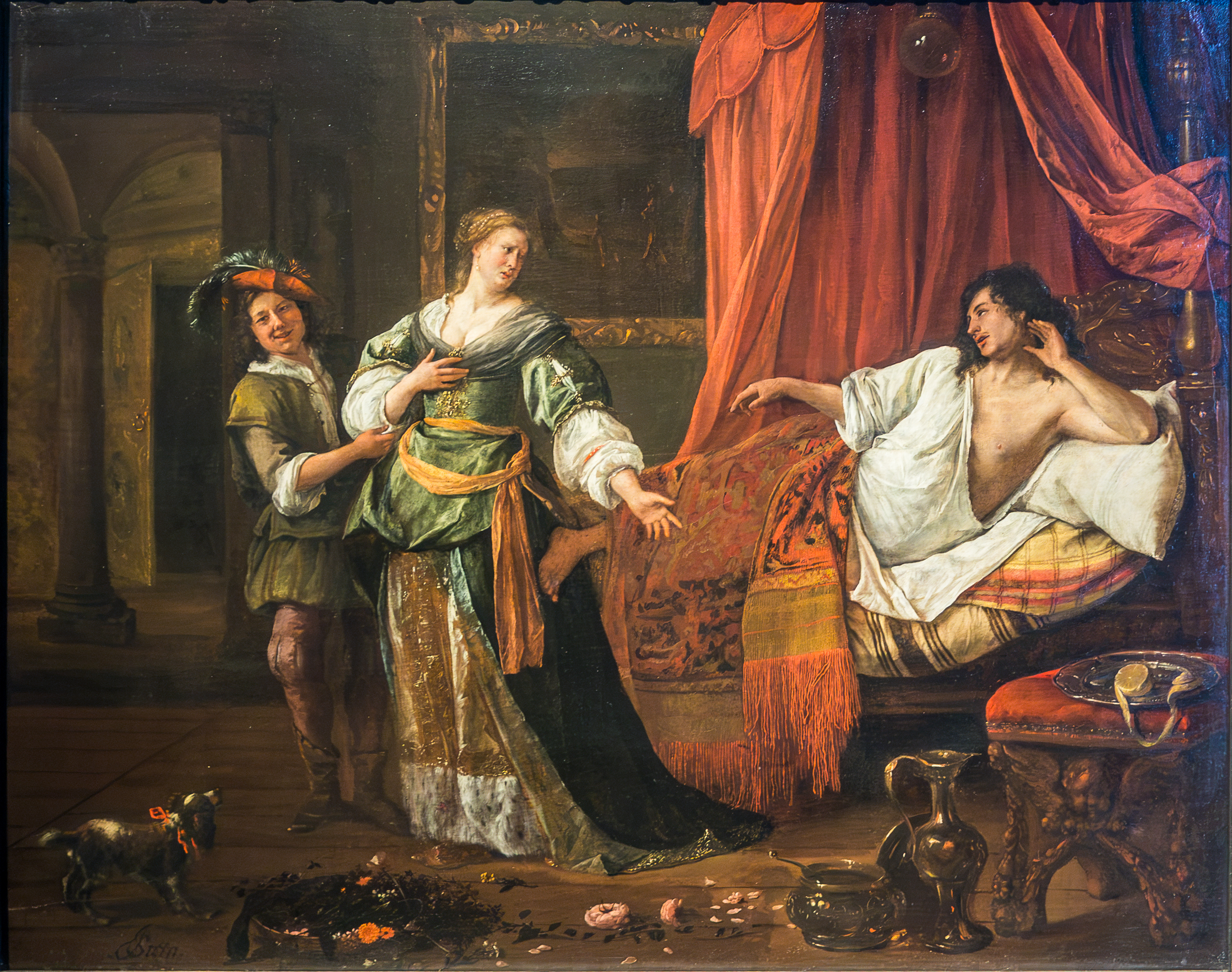
- Amnon and Tamar, painted by Jan Steen
- Born: Hebron, Judah, Israel
- Died: Baal-hazor, Ephraim, Israel
- Father: David
- Mother: Ahinoam

Amnon (Hebrew: אַמְנוֹן, romanized: ’Amnōn, "faithful") was, in the Hebrew Bible, the oldest son of King David and his second wife, Ahinoam of Jezreel. He was born in Hebron during his father's reign in Judah. He was the heir apparent to the throne of Israel until he was assassinated by his paternal half-brother Absalom to avenge the rape of Absalom's sister Tamar.

== Biblical account ==
=== Amnon's background ===
Amnon was born in Hebron to Ahinoam and King David. As the presumptive heir to the throne of Israel, Amnon enjoyed a life of power and privilege.

=== Rape of Tamar ===
Although he was the heir-apparent to David's throne, Amnon is best remembered for the rape of his paternal half-sister Tamar, daughter of David and Maachah. Despite the biblical prohibition on sexual relations between half siblings, Amnon had an overwhelming desire for her. He acted on advice from his cousin, Jonadab son of Shimeah, David's brother, to lure Tamar into his quarters by pretending to be sick and desiring her to cook a special meal for him. While in his quarters, and over her protests, he raped her, then had her expelled from his house. While King David was angry about the incident, he could not bring himself to punish his eldest son, while Absalom, Amnon's half-brother and Tamar's full brother, held onto a bitter grudge against Amnon for the rape of his sister.

According to the Babylonian Talmud: "And Thou should not associate with a sinner:.... And so we find with Amnon, who associated with Jonadab, the son of Shim'ah, David's brother; and Jonadab was a very sensible man—sensible in wickedness, as it is written [Jer. Iv .22]: Wise are they to do evil." According to others, it is meant that one shall not associate with the wicked, even to study the Torah."

According to Rav, Tamar was not, by Biblical law, David's daughter, nor Amnon's sister. Tamar was the earlier born daughter of David's wife, and thus not biologically related to David, nor Amnon. According to Michael D. Coogan's claims, however, it would have been perfectly all right for Amnon to have married his sister (he claims that the Bible was incoherent about prohibiting incest). According to the Torah, per Leviticus 18, "the children of Israel"—Israelite men and women alike—are forbidden from sexual relations between people who are "near of kin" (cf. verse 6). Siblings and half siblings (cf. verses 9 and 11). Relationships between these are particularly singled out for a curse in Deuteronomy 27, and they are of the only two kinds incestuous relationships that are among the particularly-singled-out relationships—with the other particularly-singled-out relationships, being ones of non-incestuous family betrayal (cf. verse 20) and bestiality (cf. verse 21). Incestuous relationships are considered so severe among chillul hashem, acts which bring shame to the name of God, as to be, along with the other forbidden relationships that are mentioned in Leviticus 18, punishable by death as specified in Leviticus 20. Those who committed incest were subject to two curses—one for committing incest and the second for breaking the Torah law. [27 Deuteronomy 22 and 26] and also the punishment of kareth.

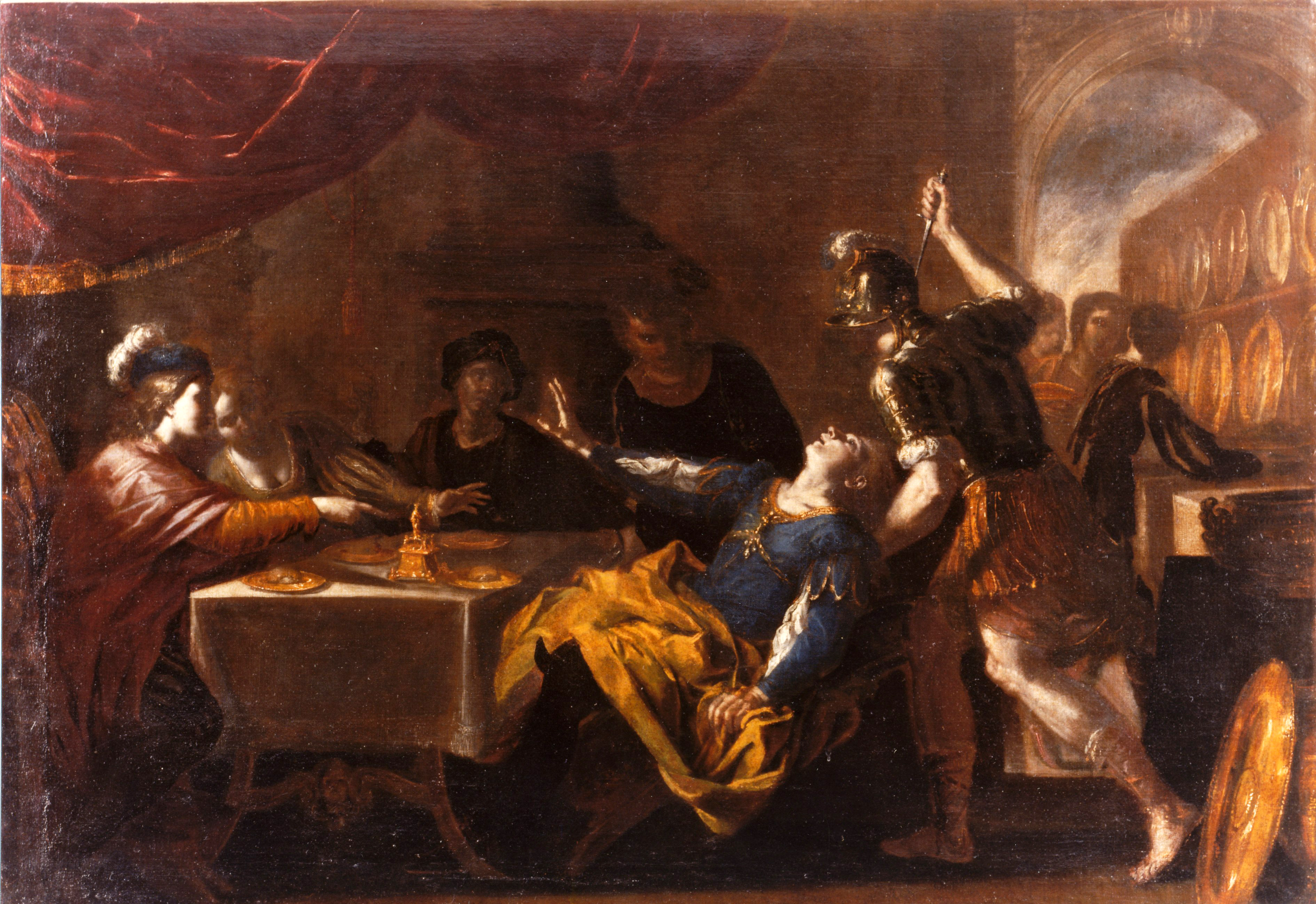
The Banquet of Absalom, attributed to Niccolò De Simone

Two years later, to avenge Tamar, Absalom invited all of David's sons to a feast at sheep-shearing time, then had his servants kill Amnon after he had become drunk with wine. As a result, Absalom fled to Geshur.

2 Samuel 13:39 records that in time David came to terms with the death of Amnon, his first-born. Methodist founder John Wesley is critical of David: "He can almost find in his heart to receive into favour the murderer of his brother. How can we excuse David from the sin of Eli, who honoured his sons more than God?"

== In rabbinic literature ==
The sages of the Mishnah point out that Amnon's love for Tamar, his half-sister, did not arise from true affection, but from passion and lust, on which account, after having attained his desire, he immediately "hated her exceedingly." "All love which depends upon some particular thing ceases when that thing ceases; thus was the love of Amnon for Tamar" (Ab. v. 16). Amnon's love for Tamar was not, however, such a transgression as is usually supposed: for, although she was a daughter of David, her mother was a prisoner of war, who had not yet become a Jewess; consequently, Tamar also had not entered the Jewish community (Sanh. 21a). The incident of Amnon and Tamar was utilized by the sages as affording justification for their rule that a man must on no account remain alone in the company of a woman, not even of an unmarried one (Sanh. l.c. et seq.).

According to the Babylonian Talmud, Amnon hated Tamar because, as he raped her, Tamar tied one of her hairs around Amnon's penis and used it to castrate him. The Babylonian Talmud also asserts that Amnon's death was a punishment from the Lord for Amnon's "lewdness" and for his actions. As noted above those who committed incest are subject to two curses in the Torah and kareth; Amnon was said to be possibly consigned to the 2nd circle of Gehenna. For reasons of propriety, the Mishnah excludes the story from public reading in synagogue, whether in the original or in Aramaic translation (Meg. 4:10).

== Literary references ==
- The Spanish poet Federico García Lorca wrote a poem about Amnon's rape of his sister Tamar, included in Lorca's 1928 poetry collection Romancero Gitano (translated as Gypsy Ballads). Lorca's version is considerably different from the Biblical original – Amnon is depicted as being overcome by a sudden uncontrollable passion, with none of the cynical planning and premeditation of the original story. He assaults and rapes Tamar and then flees into the night on his horse, with archers shooting at him from the walls – whereupon King David cuts the strings of his harp.
- The Rape of Tamar, novel by Dan Jacobson (ISBN 1-84232-139-0)
- "The Death of Amnon", poem by Elizabeth Hands
