= Ahinoam =

Hebrew female given name

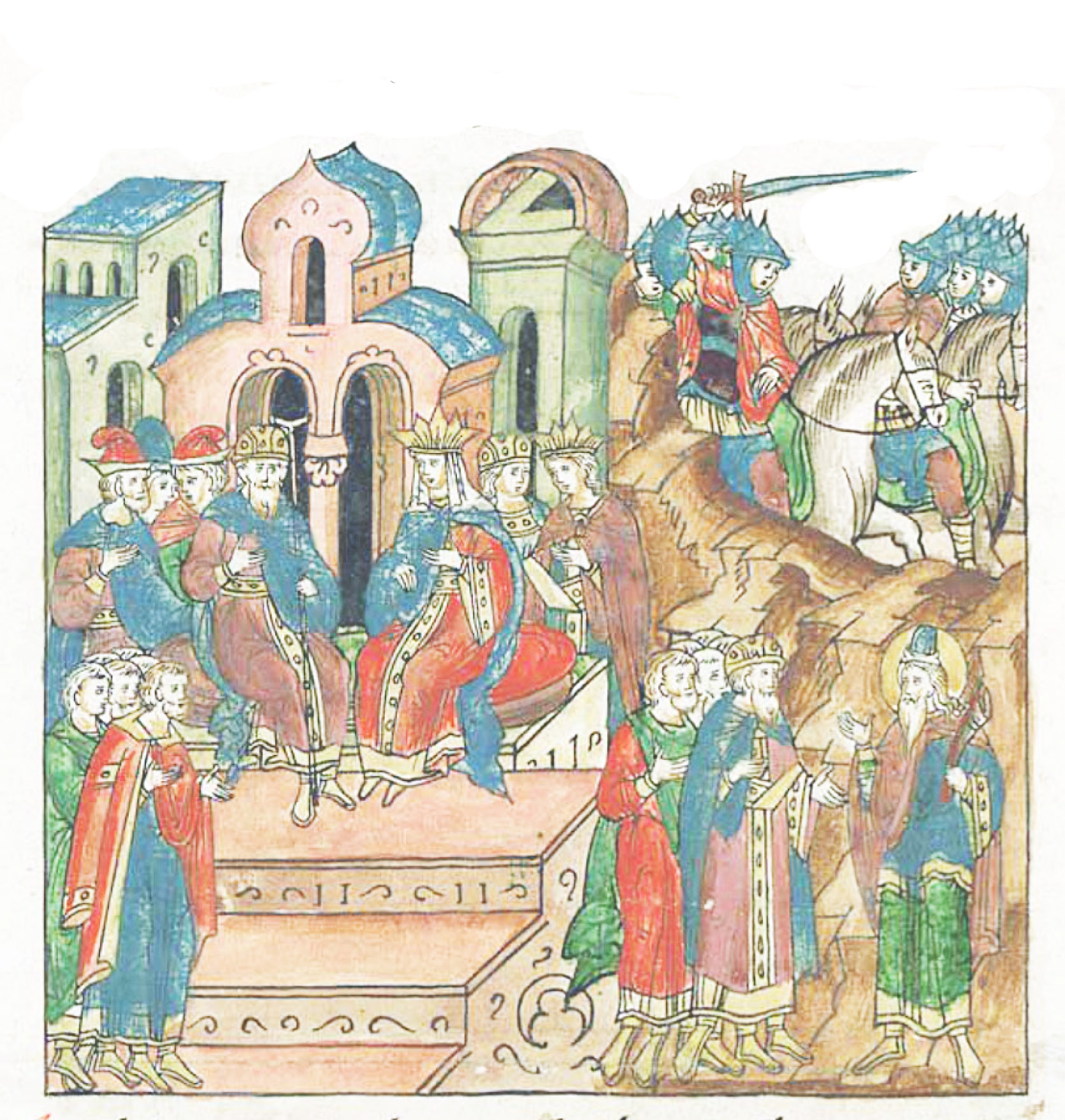
Saul's family

Ahinoam (Hebrew: אֲחִינֹעַם, romanized: ăḥīnōʿam) is a Hebrew name literally meaning brother of pleasantness, or my brother is pleasant, thus meaning pleasant.

There are two references in the Bible to people; who bear that name;

- A daughter of Ahimaaz; who became a wife of Saul and the mother of his five sons and two daughters, one of whom is Michal, David's first wife.
- A woman from Jezreel, who became David's second wife, after he fled from Saul, leaving Michal, his first wife, behind, and the mother of Amnon, David's first-born.

== Context ==
Some scholars suggest that the two may be, in fact, one person. In 2 Samuel 12:8, God tells David through the prophet Nathan, "I gave your master's house to you, and your master's wives into your arms." Jon Levenson suggests that this implies David took Ahinoam from Saul. However, Diana V. Edelman disagrees, "Such a presumption would require David to have run off with the queen mother while Saul was still on the throne, which seems unlikely. In view of the possession of the royal harem as a claim to royal legitimacy, Nathan's comment can be related to David's eventual possession of Saul's wives after he ascended the throne in the wake of Eshbaal's death..." Additionally, Leviticus 20:14 forbids men from marrying their mothers-in-law, and Ahinoam, wife of Saul, was the mother of David's first wife Michal, whom David considered to legally be his wife even after fleeing, and David was never indicted by any prophets for his marriage to Ahinoam.

Levenson goes on to note that Ahinoam is always mentioned before Abigail and that she bears David a son before Abigail does, and concludes from this that "she was already married to David when the conflict with Nabal erupted." When David had fled from Saul and dwelt with Achish, king of Gath, he had his two wives Ahinoam and Abigail with him as per 1 Samuel 27:3.

Adherents of source criticism suggest that references to a woman called Ahinoam being Saul's wife belong to the account of the republican source of the Books of Samuel, while in the passages ascribed to the monarchial source, the only mention of a woman called Ahinoam is the description of her as a wife of David.

Since Ahinoam's name usually precedes that of Abigail, it has been suggested that David married Ahinoam before he married Abigail. However, if her son Amnon was David's firstborn son, then the order of their names might indicate Ahinoam's status as the crown prince's mother. Ahinoam is with David during his stay with King Achish of Gath, and is taken captive when Amalekites raid Ziklag, David's Philistine base, but was recovered by David. She is among those who go with David to Hebron when he becomes king over Judah (2 Sam 2:2).
