= Kedoshim =

30th weekly Torah portion

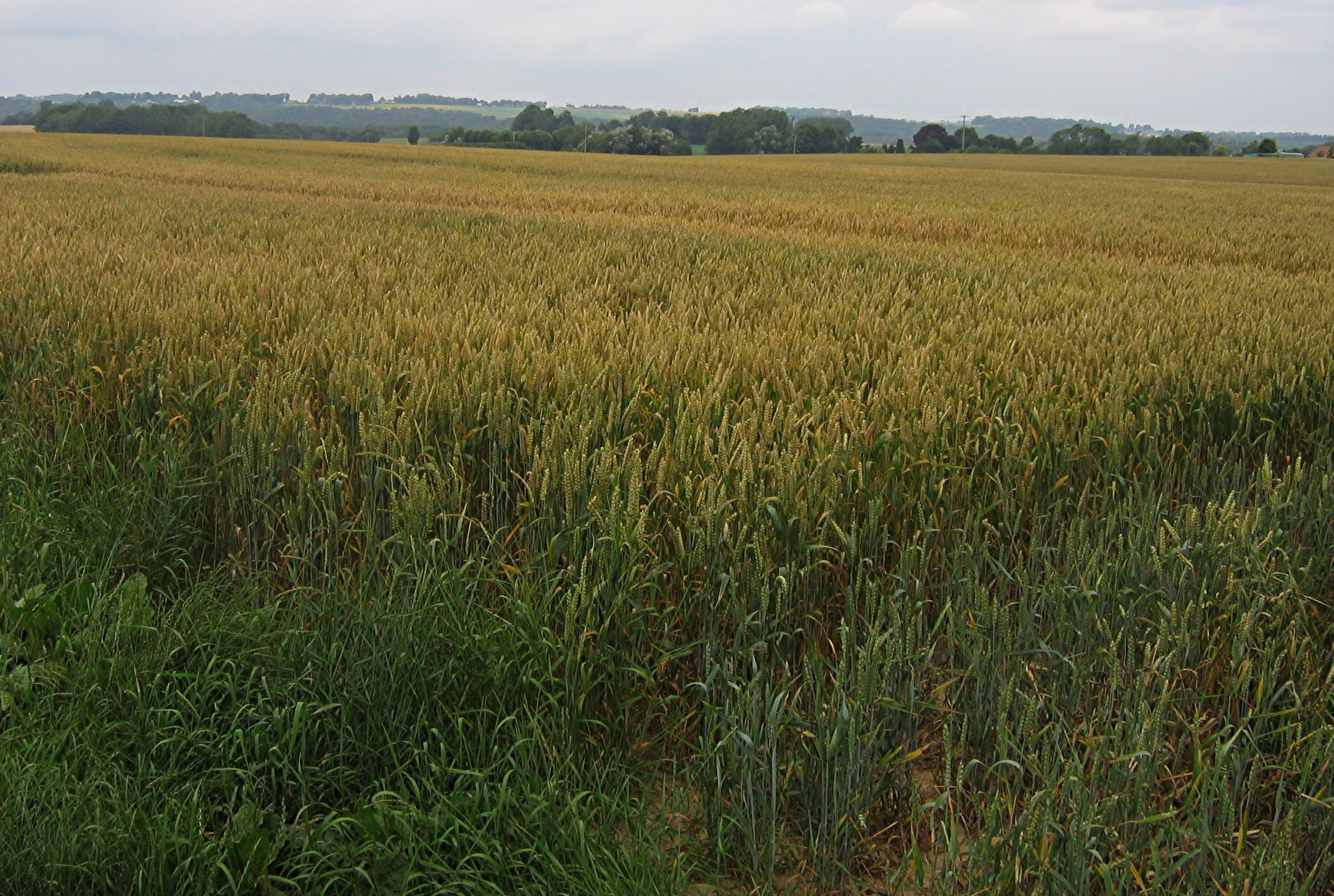
"You shall not reap all the way to the edges of your field."

Kedoshim, K'doshim, or Qedoshim (קְדֹשִׁים—Hebrew for "holy ones," the 14th word, and the first distinctive word, in the parashah) is the 30th weekly Torah portion (פָּרָשָׁה, parashah) in the annual Jewish cycle of Torah reading and the seventh in the Book of Leviticus. It constitutes Leviticus 19:1–20:27. The parashah tells of the laws of holiness and ethical behavior, repeats the Ten Commandments, and describes penalties for sexual transgressions. The parashah is made up of 3,229 Hebrew letters, 868 Hebrew words, 64 verses, and 109 lines in a Torah Scroll (סֵפֶר תּוֹרָה, Sefer Torah).

Jews generally read it in late April or May. The lunisolar Hebrew calendar contains up to 55 weeks, the exact number varying between 50 in common years and 54 or 55 in leap years. In leap years (for example, 2024), Parashat Kedoshim is read separately. In common years (for example, 2025 and 2026), Parashat Kedoshim is combined with the previous parashah, Acharei Mot, to help achieve the needed number of weekly readings. Some Conservative congregations substitute readings from part of the parashah, Leviticus 19, for the traditional reading of Leviticus 18 in the Yom Kippur Minchah service. And in the standard Reform High Holidays prayerbook (מחזור, machzor), Leviticus 19:1–4, 9–18, and 32–37 are the Torah readings for the afternoon Yom Kippur service.

Kodashim is the name of the fifth order in the Mishnah, Tosefta, and Babylonian Talmud. The term "kedoshim" is sometimes also used to refer to the six million Jews murdered during the Holocaust, whom some call "kedoshim" because they fulfilled the mitzvah of Kiddush Hashem.

== Readings ==
In traditional Sabbath Torah reading, the parashah is divided into seven readings, or עליות, aliyot.

=== First reading—Leviticus 19:1–14 ===
In the first reading, God told Moses to tell the Israelites to be holy, for God is holy. God then explained (in what scholars call "the Holiness Code") how people can be holy. God instructed the Israelites:

- To revere their mothers and fathers
- To keep the Sabbath
- Not to turn to idols
- To eat the sacrifice of well-being in the first two days and burn all of the leftovers on the third day
- Not to reap all the way to the edges of a field, but to leave some for the poor and the stranger
- Not to steal, deceive, swear falsely, or defraud
- To pay laborers their wages promptly
- Not to insult the deaf or impede the blind

=== Second reading—Leviticus 19:15–22 ===
In the second reading, God instructed the Israelites:

- To judge fairly
- Not to deal basely with their countrymen, profit by their blood, or hate them in their hearts
- To reprove kinsmen but incur no guilt because of them
- Not to take vengeance or bear a grudge
- To love others as oneself
- I am the Lord.
- Not to interbreed different species or sow fields with two kinds of seed
- Not to wear cloth from a mixture of two kinds of material
- A man who had sexual relations with a slave woman designated for another man had to offer a ram of guilt offering.

=== Third reading—Leviticus 19:23–32 ===
In the third reading, God instructed the Israelites:

- regard the fruit of a newly planted tree as forbidden for three years, set aside for God in the fourth year, and available to use in the fifth year
- Not to eat anything with its blood
- Not to practice divination or soothsaying
- Not to round off the side-growth on their heads or destroy the side-growth of their beards
- Not to gash their flesh for the dead
- Not to degrade their daughters or make them harlots
- To venerate God's sanctuary
- Not to turn to ghosts or inquire of spirits
- To rise before the aged and show deference to the old

=== Fourth reading—Leviticus 19:33–37 ===
In the fourth reading, God instructed the Israelites:

- Not to wrong strangers who reside in the land, but to love them as oneself
- Not to falsify weights or measures

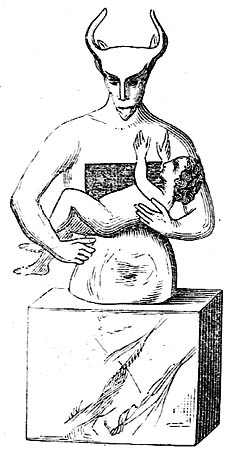
one imagining of Molech

=== Fifth reading—Leviticus 20:1–7 ===
In the fifth reading, God then told Moses to instruct the Israelites of the following penalties for transgressions.

The following were to be put to death:

- One who gave a child to Molech

The following were to be cut off from their people (כרת, karet):

- One who turned to ghosts or familiar spirits

=== Sixth reading—Leviticus 20:8–22 ===
In the sixth reading, God told Moses to instruct the Israelites of the following penalties for transgressions.

The following were to be put to death:

- One who insulted his father or mother
- A man who committed adultery with a married woman, and the married woman with whom he committed it
- A man who lay with his father's wife, and his father wife with whom he lay
- A man who lay with his daughter-in-law, and his daughter-in-law with whom he lay
- A man who lay with a male as one lies with a woman, and the male with whom he lay
- A man who married a woman and her mother, and the woman and mother whom he married
- A man who had carnal relations with a beast, and the beast with whom he had relations
- A woman who approached any beast to mate with it, and the beast that she approached
- One who had a ghost or a familiar spirit

The following were to be cut off from their people (כרת, karet):

- A man who married his sister, and the sister whom he married
- A man who lay with a woman in her infirmity, and the woman with whom he lay

The following were to die childless:

- A man who uncovered the nakedness of his aunt, and the aunt whose nakedness he uncovered
- A man who married his brother's wife, and the brother's wife whom he married

God then enjoined the Israelites faithfully to observe all God's laws, lest the Promised Land spew them out.

=== Seventh reading—Leviticus 20:23–27 ===
In the seventh reading, God made clear that it was because the land's former inhabitants did all these things that God dispossessed them. God designated the Israelites as holy to God, for God is holy, and God had set the Israelites apart from other peoples to be God's.

=== Readings according to the triennial cycle ===
Jews who read the Torah according to the triennial cycle of Torah reading read the parashah according to a different schedule.

== In ancient parallels ==
The parashah has parallels in these ancient sources:

=== Leviticus chapter 20 ===
Leviticus 20:24, as well as Exodus 3:8 and 17, 13:5, and 33:3, Numbers 13:27 and 14:8, and Deuteronomy 6:3, 11:9, 26:9 and 15, 27:3, and 31:20 describe the Land of Israel as a land flowing “with milk and honey.” Similarly, the Middle Egyptian (early second millennium BCE) tale of Sinuhe Palestine described the Land of Israel or, as the Egyptian tale called it, the land of Yaa: "It was a good land called Yaa. Figs were in it and grapes. It had more wine than water. Abundant was its honey, plentiful its oil. All kind of fruit were on its trees. Barley was there and emmer, and no end of cattle of all kinds."

== In inner-biblical interpretation ==
The parashah has parallels or is discussed in these Biblical sources:

=== Leviticus chapter 19 ===
In Leviticus 19:2, God told Moses to tell the Israelites, “You shall be holy; for I the Lord your God am holy.” Professor David P. Wright of Brandeis University counted more than 850 instances of the three-letter Hebrew root denoting holiness (קדש, kdsh) as a verb, noun, or adjective in the Hebrew Bible (תנך, Tanakh). Larry Mitchel counted 430 instances of “holy” (קֹדֶשׁ, kodesh) as an adjective or noun, 172 instances of the verb “be holy” or “consecrate” (kadash), 115 instances of “holy” (קָדוֹשׁ, kadosh) as an adjective, and 11 instances of the adjective “consecrated” or noun “cult prostitute” (קָדֵשׁ, kadesh). Wright noted that the Hebrew Bible describes as “holy” God, lesser divine beings, Priests, the Israelite people, Nazirites, Levites, firstborn people, prophets, the Sanctuary, offerings, Sanctuary furnishings, Priestly clothing, property dedicated to the Priests, anointing oil, incense, certain water, the Land of Israel, Heaven, the Sabbath, Festivals, the Jubilee year, certain wars, and the Covenant.

Leviticus 19:33–34 admonishes the Israelites not to wrong the stranger, “for you were strangers in the land of Egypt.” (See also Exodus 22:20; 23:9; Deuteronomy 1:16; 10:17–19; 24:14–15 and 17–22; and 27:19.) Similarly, in Amos 3:1, the 8th century BCE prophet Amos anchored his pronouncements in the covenant community's Exodus history, saying, “Hear this word that the Lord has spoken against you, O children of Israel, against the whole family that I brought up out of the land of Egypt.”

Professors Tamara Cohn Eskenazi of the Hebrew Union College-Jewish Institute of Religion and Tikva Frymer-Kensky of the University of Chicago Divinity School argued that Ruth enacted the love due to the stranger in Leviticus 19:34 when in Moab, Ruth devoted herself to Naomi, a stranger in Moab. Then Boaz provided her counterpart by making possible the inclusion of Ruth the Moabite in the community at Bethlehem.

=== Leviticus chapter 20 ===
Leviticus 20:20 addresses God's role in the creation of children. While Leviticus 12:6–8 required a new mother to bring a burnt-offering and a sin-offering, Leviticus 26:9, Deuteronomy 28:11, and Psalm 127:3–5 make clear that having children is a blessing from God; Genesis 15:2 and 1 Samuel 1:5–11 characterize childlessness as a misfortune; and Leviticus 20:20 and Deuteronomy 28:18 threaten childlessness as a punishment.

Leviticus 20:3 announced the judgment that those who gave their children to Molech profaned God's Name. In Amos 2:7, Amos similarly condemned as profaning God's Name fathers and sons who had sex with the same woman—likely exploiting a household servant woman. Amos grouped these sinners in the same verse along with those who trample the heads of the poor into the dust and those who make the humble walk a twisted course, thereby suggesting more generally that those who take advantage of people in lower social stations profane God's Name.

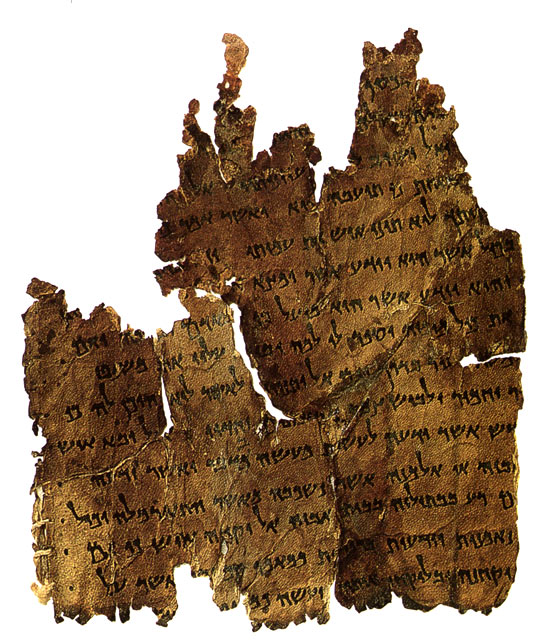
A Damascus Document Scroll found at Qumran

== In early nonrabbinic interpretation ==
The parashah has parallels or is discussed in these early nonrabbinic sources:

=== Leviticus chapter 20 ===
The Damascus Document of the Qumran sectarians prohibited a man's marrying his niece, deducing this from the prohibition in Leviticus 18:13 of a woman's marrying her nephew. Professor Lawrence Schiffman of New York University noted that this was a point of contention between the Pharisees and other Jewish groups in Second Temple times.

== In classical rabbinic interpretation ==
The parashah is discussed in these rabbinic sources from the era of the Mishnah and the Talmud:

=== Leviticus chapter 19 ===
Rabbi Judah ben Pazzi deduced from the juxtaposition of the sexual prohibitions of Leviticus 18 and the exhortation to holiness in Leviticus 19:2 that those who fence themselves against sexual immorality are called holy, and Rabbi Joshua ben Levi taught that wherever one finds a fence against sexual immorality, one will also find sanctity.

A midrash interpreted God's message to Israel in Leviticus 19:1–2 to mean: "My children, as I am separate, so you be separate; as I am holy, so you be holy."

Rabbi Abin likened the two exhortations to holiness in Leviticus 19:1–2 and 20:7 to the case of a king who rewarded his drunkard watchmen twice as much as his sober watchmen. Similarly, God twice exhorted the Israelites to holiness because the Evil Inclination sways people like drunkards, whereas the Evil Inclination does not exist among celestial beings. Similarly, Rabbi Abin likened the two exhortations to holiness to the case of the citizens who made three crowns for the king, and the king placed one on his own head and two on the heads of his sons. Similarly, every day the celestial beings crown God with three sanctities, calling him, in the words of Isaiah 6:3, "Holy, holy, holy." God then places one crown of holiness on God's own head and two crowns of holiness on the head of Israel.

Rabbi Ḥiyya taught that the section beginning at Leviticus 19:1 was spoken in the presence of the whole Israelite people, because it includes most of the essential principles of the Torah. And Rabbi Levi said it was because it includes each of the Ten Commandments, noting that: (1) Exodus 20:2 says, "I am the Lord your God," and Leviticus 19:3 says, "I am the Lord your God"; (2) Exodus 20:2–3 says, "You shall have no other gods," and Leviticus 19:4 says, "Nor make to yourselves molten gods"; (3) Exodus 20:7 says, "You shall not take the name of the Lord your God in vain," and Leviticus 19:12 says, "And you shall not swear by My name falsely"; (4) Exodus 20:8 says, "Remember the Sabbath day," and Leviticus 19:3 says, "And you shall keep My Sabbaths"; (5) Exodus 20:12 says, "Honor your father and your mother," and Leviticus 19:3 says, "You shall fear every man his mother, and his father"; (6) Exodus 20:13 says, "You shall not murder," and Leviticus 19:16 says, "Neither shall you stand idly by the blood of your neighbor"; (7) Exodus 20:13 says, "You shall not commit adultery," and Leviticus 20:10 says, "Both the adulterer and the adulteress shall surely be put to death; (8) Exodus 20:13 says, "You shall not steal," and Leviticus 19:11 says, "You shall not steal"; (9) Exodus 20:13 says, "You shall not bear false witness," and Leviticus 19:16 says, "You shall not go up and down as a talebearer"; and (10) Exodus 20:14 says, "You shall not covet . . . anything that is your neighbor's," and Leviticus 19:18 says, "You shall love your neighbor as yourself."

A Baraita cited the words of Leviticus 19:3, "You shall fear every man his mother and his father, and you shall keep My Sabbaths," to teach that one's duty to honor one's parent does not supersede one's duty to keep the Sabbath.

Rabbi Shimon noted that everywhere else, Scripture mentions a father's honor before the mother's honor. But Leviticus 19:3 mentions the mother first to teach that one should honor both parents equally. The Sages, however, said that the father comes before the mother in all places, because both the son and the mother are bound to honor the father.

It was taught in a Baraita that Rabbi said that God knows that a son honors his mother more than his father, because the mother wins him over with words. Therefore, (in Exodus 20:12) God put the honor of the father before that of the mother. God knows that a son fears his father more than his mother, because the father teaches him Torah. Therefore, (in Leviticus 19:3) God put the fear of the mother before that of the father.

Noting that as Leviticus 19:3 commands, "You shall fear your father and mother," and Deuteronomy 6:13 commands, "The Lord your God you shall fear and you shall serve," the Rabbis taught in a Baraita that Scripture likens the fear of parents to the fear of God. As Exodus 20:12 commands, "Honor your father and your mother," and Proverbs 3:9 directs, "Honor the Lord with your substance," Scripture likens the honor due to parents to that due to God. And as Exodus 21:17 commands, "He that curses his father or his mother shall surely be put to death," and Leviticus 24:15 commands, "Whoever curses his God shall bear his sin," Scripture likens cursing parents to cursing God. But the Baraita conceded that with respect to striking (which Exodus 21:15 addresses regarding parents) that it is certainly impossible (with respect to God). The Baraita concluded that these comparisons between parents and God are only logical, since the three (God, the mother, and the father) are partners in creation of the child. For the Rabbis taught in a Baraita that there are three partners in the creation of a person—God, the father, and the mother. When one honors one's father and mother, God considers it as if God had dwelt among them and they had honored God. And a Tanna taught before Rav Nachman that when one vexes one's father and mother, God considers it right not to dwell among them, for had God dwelt among them, they would have vexed God.

Tractate Shabbat in the Mishnah, Tosefta, Jerusalem Talmud, and Babylonian Talmud interpreted the laws of the Sabbath in Exodus 16:23 and 29; 20:8–11; 23:12; 31:13–17; 35:2–3; Leviticus 19:3; 23:3; Numbers 15:32–36; and Deuteronomy 5:12.

A midrash asked to which commandment Deuteronomy 11:22 refers when it says, "For if you shall diligently keep all this commandment that I command you, to do it, to love the Lord your God, to walk in all His ways, and to cleave to Him, then will the Lord drive out all these nations from before you, and you shall dispossess nations greater and mightier than yourselves." Rabbi Levi said that "this commandment" refers to the recitation of the Shema (Deuteronomy 6:4–9), but the Rabbis said that it refers to the Sabbath, which is equal to all the precepts of the Torah.

The Alphabet of Rabbi Akiva taught that when God was giving Israel the Torah, God told them that if they accepted the Torah and observed God's commandments, then God would give them for eternity a most precious thing that God possessed—the World To Come. When Israel asked to see in this world an example of the World To Come, God replied that the Sabbath is an example of the World To Come.

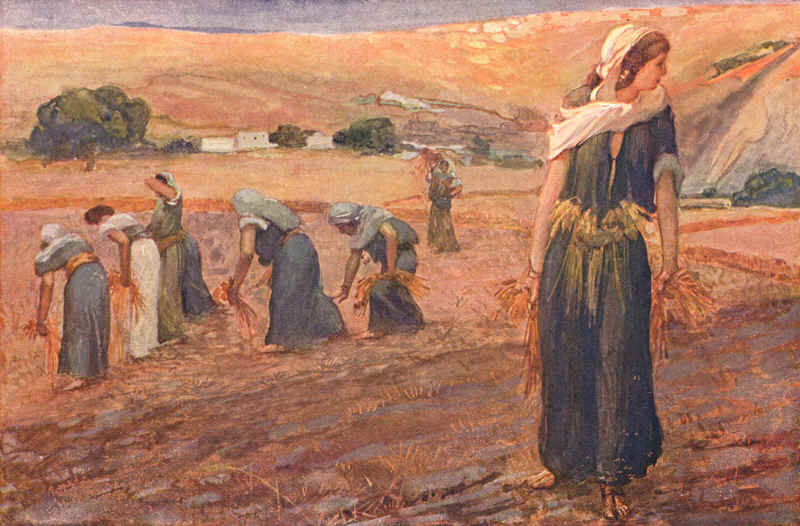
Gleaners (watercolor circa 1896–1902 by James Tissot)

Tractate Peah in the Mishnah, Tosefta, and Jerusalem Talmud interpreted the laws of the harvest of the corner of the field and gleanings to be given to the poor in Leviticus 19:9–10 and 23:22, and Deuteronomy 24:19–22.

The Mishnah and the Tosefta taught that the Torah sets no upper limit for the donation of the corners of one's field to the poor. And the Mishnah also taught that one should not make the amount left to the poor less than one-sixtieth of the entire crop. And even though no definite amount is given, the amount given should accord with the size of the field, the number of poor people, and the extent of the yield.

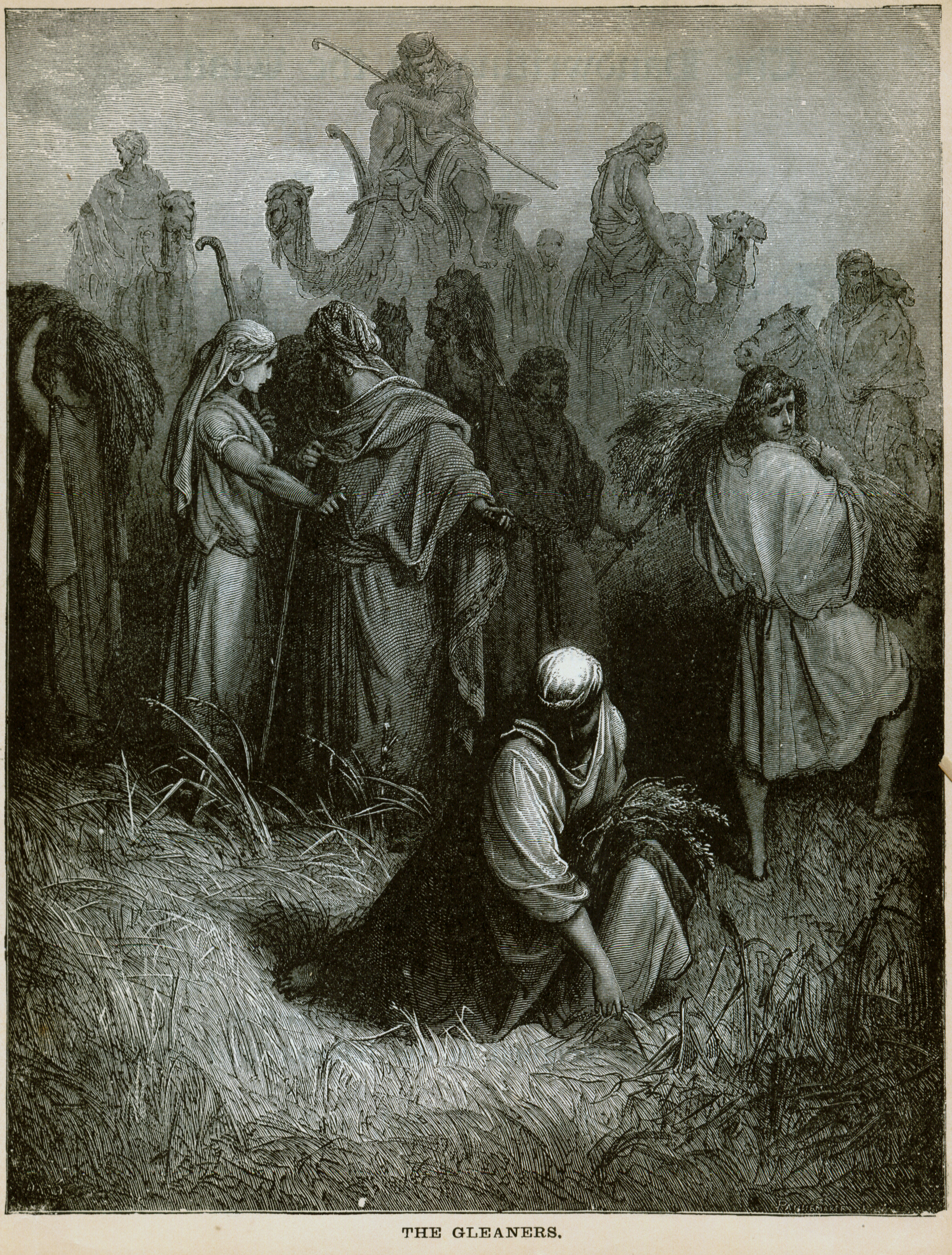
The Gleaners (engraving by Gustave Doré from the 1865 La Sainte Bible)

Rabbi Eliezer taught that one who cultivates land in which one can plant a quarter kav of seed is obligated to give a corner to the poor. Rabbi Joshua said land that yields two seah of grain. Rabbi Tarfon said land of at least six handbreadths by six handbreadths. Rabbi Judah ben Betera said land that requires two strokes of a sickle to harvest, and the law is as he spoke. Rabbi Akiva said that one who cultivates land of any size is obligated to give a corner to the poor and the first fruits.

The Mishnah taught that the poor could enter a field to collect three times a day—in the morning, at midday, and in the afternoon. Rabban Gamliel taught that they said this only so that landowners should not reduce the number of times that the poor could enter. Rabbi Akiva taught that they said this only so that landowners should not increase the number of times that the poor had to enter. The landowners of Beit Namer used to harvest along a rope and allowed the poor to collect a corner from every row.

The Mishnah taught that one who does not allow the poor to glean, or who allows one and not another, or who helps only one, is stealing from the poor. The Mishnah taught that Proverbs 22:28 speaks of this when it says, “Do not encroach upon the border of those who go up.”

The Gemara noted that Leviticus 19:9 includes a superfluous term “by reaping” and reasoned that this must teach that the obligation to leave for the poor applies to crops that the owner uproots as well as to crops that the owner cuts. And the Gemara reasoned that the superfluous words “When you reap” in Leviticus 23:22 teach that the obligation also extends to one who picks a crop by hand.

Noting that the discussion of gifts to the poor in Leviticus 23:22 appears between discussions of the festivals—Passover and Shavuot on one side, and Rosh Hashanah and Yom Kippur on the other—Rabbi Avardimos ben Rabbi Yossi said that this teaches that people who give immature clusters of grapes (as in Leviticus 19:10 and Deuteronomy 24:21), the forgotten sheaf (as in Deuteronomy 24:19), the corner of the field (as in Leviticus 19:9 and 23:22), and the poor tithe (as in Deuteronomy 14:28 and 26:12) is accounted as if the Temple existed and they offered up their sacrifices in it. And for those who do not give to the poor, it is accounted to them as if the Temple existed and they did not offer up their sacrifices in it.

The Mishnah taught that even if a landowner said, “I am harvesting on the condition that whatever I forget I will take,” the landowner was still subject to the law of the forgotten sheaf in Leviticus 19:9–10 (and anything the landowner forgot belonged to the poor).

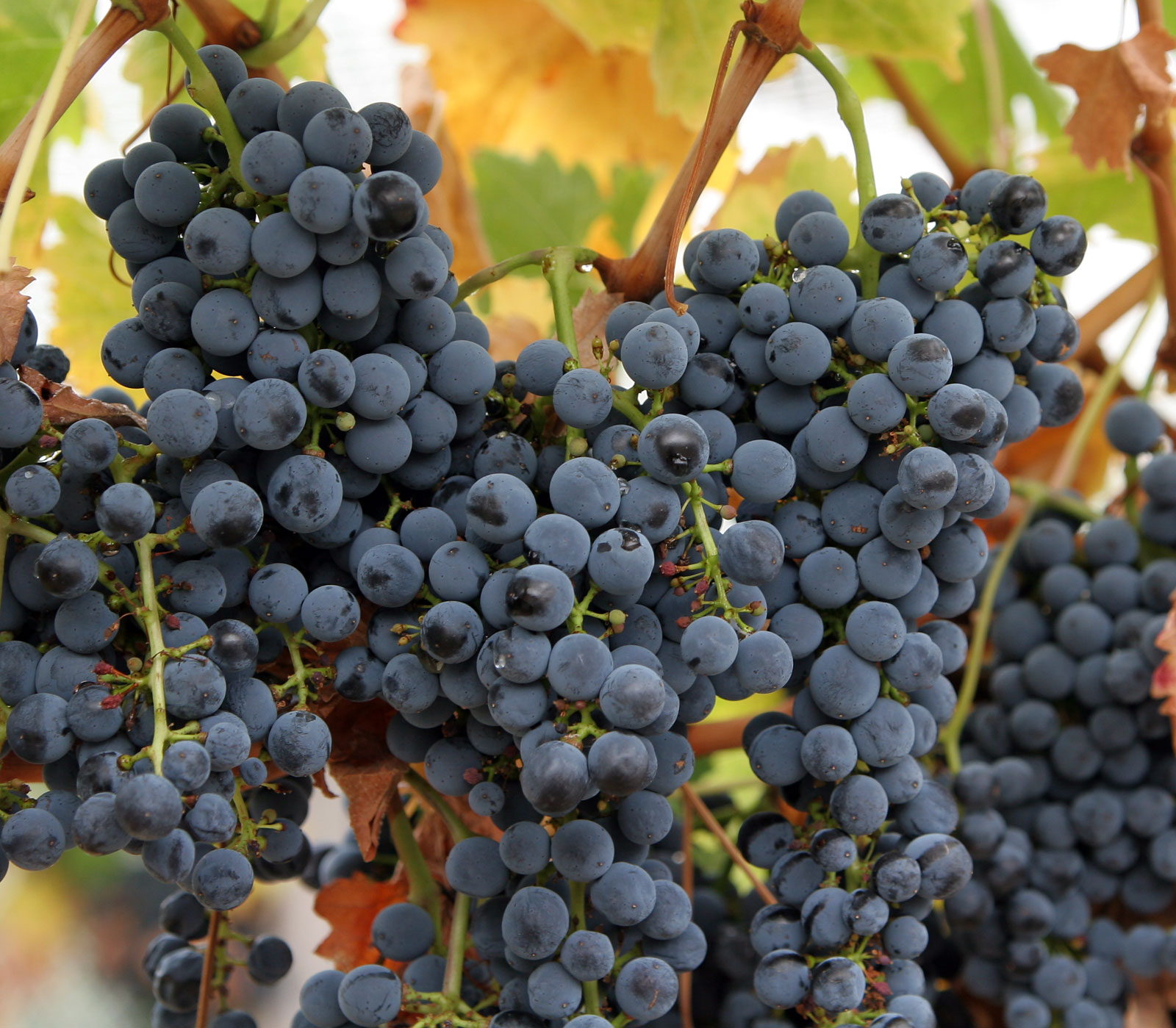
Grapes

The Mishnah defined “fallen fruit (פֶרֶט, peret)” within the meaning of Leviticus 19:10 to mean that which falls at the time of the grape harvest. The Mishnah taught that one who left a basket under the vine when harvesting grapes was stealing from the poor. The Mishnah said that Proverbs 22:28 speaks of this when it says, “Do not withdraw the border of those who go up.”

The Mishnah defined “a defective cluster (עוֹלֶלֶת, olelet)” within the meaning of Leviticus 19:10 and Deuteronomy 24:21 to mean any cluster that had neither a shoulder nor a dangling portion (but rather was entirely attached to the main stem). If the cluster had a shoulder or a dangling portion, it belonged to the property owner, but if there was a doubt, it belonged to the poor. A cluster that was attached to the joint between branches or the stem and the trunk, if it was plucked with the grape cluster, it belonged to the property owner; if not, it belonged to the poor. Rabbi Judah said that a single-grape cluster was a cluster, but the Sages said that it was a defective cluster (and thus belonged to the poor).

The Mishnah taught that after the weakest of the poor had come and gone, everyone (regardless of poverty or wealth) was permitted to take individual stalks that fell during harvest (לֶקֶט, leket—which had to be left for the poor to glean).

The Mishnah taught that if a wife foreswore all benefit from other people, her husband could not annul his wife's vow, but she could still benefit from the gleanings, forgotten sheaves, and the corner of the field that Leviticus 19:9–10 and 23:22, and Deuteronomy 24:19–21 commanded farmers to leave for the poor.

Rabbi Josiah taught that we learn the formal prohibition against kidnapping from the words "You shall not steal" in Exodus 20:13 (since Deuteronomy 22:7 and Exodus 21:16 merely state the punishment for abduction). Rabbi Johanan taught that we learn it from Leviticus 25:42, "They shall not be sold as bondsmen." The Gemara harmonized the two positions by concluding that Rabbi Josiah referred to the prohibition for abduction, while Rabbi Johanan referred to the prohibition for selling a kidnapped person. Similarly, the Rabbis taught in a Baraita that Exodus 20:13, "You shall not steal," refers to the stealing of human beings. To the potential objection that Exodus 20:13 refers to property theft, the Baraita responded that one of the thirteen principles by which we interpret the Torah is that a law is interpreted by its general context, and the Ten Commandments speak of capital crimes (like murder and adultery). (Thus "You shall not steal" must refer to a capital crime and thus to kidnapping.) Another Baraita taught that the words "You shall not steal" in Leviticus 19:11 refer to theft of property. To the potential objection that Leviticus 19:11 refers to the theft of human beings, the Baraita responded that the general context of Leviticus 19:10–15 speaks of money matters; therefore Leviticus 19:11 must refer to monetary theft.

Tractates Nedarim and Shevuot in the Mishnah, Tosefta, Jerusalem Talmud, and Babylonian Talmud interpreted the laws of vows and oaths in Exodus 20:7, 5:1–10 and 19:12, Numbers 30:2–17, and Deuteronomy 23:24.

The Mishnah interpreted Leviticus 19:13 and Deuteronomy 24:14–15 to teach that a worker engaged by the day could collect the worker's wages all the following night. If engaged by the night, the worker could collect the wages all the following day. If engaged by the hour, the worker could collect the wages all that day and night. If engaged by the week, month, year, or 7-year period, if the worker's time expired during the day, the worker could collect the wages all that day. If the worker's time expired during the night, the worker could collect the wages all that night and the following day.

The Mishnah taught that the hire of persons, animals, or utensils were all subject to the law of Deuteronomy 24:15 that "in the same day you shall give him his hire" and the law of Leviticus 19:13 that "the wages of a hired servant shall not abide with you all night until the morning." The employer became liable only when the worker or vendor demanded payment from the employer. Otherwise, the employer did not infringe the law. If the employer gave the worker or vendor a draft on a shopkeeper or a money changer, the employer complied with the law. A worker who claimed the wages within the set time could collect payment if the worker merely swore that the employer had not yet paid. But if the set time had passed, the worker's oath was insufficient to collect payment. Yet if the worker had witnesses that the worker had demanded payment (within the set time), the worker could still swear and receive payment.

The Mishnah taught that the employer of a resident alien was subject to the law of Deuteronomy 24:15 that "in the same day you shall give him his hire" (as Deuteronomy 24:14 refers to the stranger), but not to the law of Leviticus 19:13 that "the wages of a hired servant shall not abide with you all night until the morning."

Abaye taught that the rule that a community should mark graves may be derived from Leviticus 19:14, "And put not a stumbling-block before the blind."

The Mishnah taught that one who pursues a neighbor with intent to kill must be saved from sin even at the cost of the pursuer's life. The Gemara taught that it is from Leviticus 19:16, "You shall not stand idly by the blood of another," that the Sages in a Baraita derived that where one person is pursuing another with intent to kill, the pursued person should be saved even at the cost of the pursuer's life. The Gemara also cited Leviticus 19:16 for a Baraita that taught that one is obligated to try to save another whom one sees drowning in a river, or being dragged away by a wild animal, or being attacked by bandits. The Gemara further taught that the verse "Do not stand by the blood of another" teaches that one must even hire others to help rescue a person whom one sees to be jeopardy, and one transgresses a prohibition if one does not do so.

In a Baraita, the Rabbis reasoned that had Leviticus 19:17 said simply, "You shall not hate your brother," one might have believed that one should simply not smite, slap, or curse him; therefore Leviticus 19:17 states "in your heart" to cover intentions as well as actions. Scripture speaks of hatred in the heart.

Thus, in Leviticus 19:17, the heart hates. A midrash catalogued the wide range of additional capabilities of the heart reported in the Hebrew Bible. The heart speaks, sees, hears, walks, falls, stands, rejoices, cries, is comforted, is troubled, becomes hardened, grows faint, grieves, fears, can be broken, becomes proud, rebels, invents, cavils, overflows, devises, desires, goes astray, lusts, is refreshed, can be stolen, is humbled, is enticed, errs, trembles, is awakened, loves, envies, is searched, is rent, meditates, is like a fire, is like a stone, turns in repentance, becomes hot, dies, melts, takes in words, is susceptible to fear, gives thanks, covets, becomes hard, makes merry, acts deceitfully, speaks from out of itself, loves bribes, writes words, plans, receives commandments, acts with pride, makes arrangements, and aggrandizes itself.

Rabbi Samuel bar Rav Isaac said that Rav said that one is permitted to hate another whom one sees committing a sin, as Exodus 23:5 states: "If you see the donkey of he who hates you lying under its load." But the Gemara asked whether one is permitted to hate one's fellow, as Leviticus 19:17 says, "You shall not hate your brother in your heart," which prohibits hating one's fellow. The Gemara concluded that one is permitted to hate another for evil behavior one sees, whereas others who are unaware of these actions may not hate the other. Rav Naḥman bar Isaac said: Not only is this permitted, it is even a commandment to hate this other person, as Proverbs 8:13 states: "The fear of God is to hate evil."

In a Baraita, the Rabbis deduced from the command in Leviticus 19:17 that "you shall surely rebuke your neighbor" that one is obliged to reprove a neighbor whom one observes doing something wrong. And they deduced from the emphatic words "you shall surely rebuke" that if one has rebuked one's neighbor and the neighbor does not accept the rebuke, then one must rebuke the neighbor again. But the Rabbis deduced that Leviticus 19:17 continues to say "you shall not bear sin because of him" to teach that one should not rebuke a neighbor to the neighbor's embarrassment.

Reading the report of Genesis 21:25, "And Abraham reproved Abimelech," Rabbi Jose ben Rabbi Hanina taught that reproof leads to love, as Proverbs 9:8 says, "Reprove a wise man, and he will love you." Rabbi Jose ben Hanina said that love unaccompanied by reproof is not love. And Resh Lakish taught that reproof leads to peace, and thus (as Genesis 21:25 reports) "Abraham reproved Abimelech." Resh Lakish said that peace unaccompanied by reproof is not peace.

The Gemara read the words of Leviticus 26:37, "And they shall stumble one upon another," to mean that one will stumble through the sin of another. The Gemara concluded that all everyone is held responsible for each another. Similarly, elsewhere, the Gemara read the words of Leviticus 26:37, "And they shall stumble one upon another," to mean that for all transgressions of the Torah, the whole world is punished. Thus the Gemara taught that all Jews stand as guarantors for one another. And reading Song of Songs 6:11, "I went down into the garden of nuts," to apply to Israel, a midrash taught that just as when one takes a nut from a stack of nuts, all the rest come toppling over, so if a single Jew is smitten, all Jews feel it, as Numbers 16:22 says, "Shall one man sin, and will You be angry with all the congregation?"

Rabbi Tarfon wondered whether anyone in his generation could accept reproof, for if one told another, "Remove the mote from between your eyes," the other would answer, "Remove the beam from between your eyes!" Rabbi Eleazar ben Azariah wondered whether anyone in his generation knew how to reprove. Rabbi Johanan ben Nuri said that he would often complain about Akiva to Rabban Gamaliel Beribbi, causing Akiva to be punished as a result, but Akiva all the more showered love upon Rabbi Johanan ben Nuri, bearing out what Proverbs 9:8 says: "Reprove not a scorner, lest he hate you; reprove a wise man, and he will love you."

Rabbi Judah the son of Rabbi Simeon ben Pazzi asked his father whether it was preferable to reprove honestly or to forgo reproof out of false modesty. Rabbi Simeon answered that restraint out of true modesty is better still, for a Master said modesty is greatest of all. Thus, false modesty is also preferable, he reasoned, for Rav Judah said in the name of Rav that one should engage in Torah study and good deeds, even if not for their own sake, because through doing good for an ulterior motive one will come to do good for its own sake. To illustrate honest reproof and forbearance out of false modesty, the Gemara told how Rav Huna and Ḥiyya bar Rav were sitting before Samuel, when Ḥiyya bar Rav complained about how Rav Huna was bothering him. Rav Huna undertook not to bother Ḥiyya bar Rav anymore. After Ḥiyya bar Rav left, Rav Huna told Samuel how Ḥiyya bar Rav had done this and that wrong thing. So Samuel asked Rav Huna why he had not told Ḥiyya bar Rav to his face. Rav Huna replied that he did not want to put the son of Rav to shame (and thus chose insincere forbearance over honest rebuke).

The Gemara discussed how far one should reprove another. Rav said that one should reprove until the one reproved strikes the reprover. Samuel said that one should reprove until the one reproved curses the reprover. Rabbi Johanan said that one should reprove only until the one reproved rebukes the reprover. The Gemara noted a similar dispute among Tannaim. Rabbi Eliezer said until the one reproved strikes the reprover. Rabbi Joshua said until the one reproved curses the reprove. Ben Azzai said until the one reproved rebukes the reprover. Rav Naḥman bar Isaac said that all three cited 1 Samuel 20:30 to support their positions. 1 Samuel 20:30 says: "Then Saul's anger was kindled against Jonathan and he said to him: ‘You son of perverse rebellion, do not I know that you have chosen the son of Jesse (David) to your own shame, and to the shame of your mother's nakedness?'" And shortly thereafter, 1 Samuel 20:33 says: "And Saul cast his spear at him to smite him." Rabbi Eliezer said, "until the one reproved strikes" because 1 Samuel 20:33 says "to smite him." Rabbi Joshua said, "until the one reproved curses" because 1 Samuel 20:33 says: "to your own shame and to the shame of your mother's nakedness." Ben Azzai said, "until the one reproved rebukes" because 1 Samuel 20:30 says: "Then Saul's anger was kindled." The Gemara asked how Ben Azzai, who said "until the one reproved rebukes," explained how 1 Samuel 20:33 also mentions beating and cursing. The Gemara reasoned that Jonathan risked his life even further (and rebuked even more than required) because of his great love of David.

Rabbi Nathan cautioned, however, that one should not reprove another about a fault that one has oneself. Thus, the proverb runs: If there is a case of hanging in a person's family record, one should not even ask that person to hang up a fish.

And Rabbi Il'a said in the name of Rabbi Eleazar son of Rabbi Simeon that just as one is obliged to say words of reproof that will be accepted, so one is obliged not to say words of reproof that will not be accepted. Rabbi Abba said that it is a duty to forgo reproof that will not be accepted, as Proverbs 9:8 says: "Reprove not a scorner, lest he hate you; reprove a wise man, and he will love you."

Reading the words of Leviticus 19:18, "You shall not take vengeance," the Sifra defined the extent of the term "vengeance." The Sifra taught that the term "vengeance" applies to a case where one person asks to borrow a second's sickle, and the second does not lend it, and then on the next day, the second asks the first to borrow the first's spade, and the first declines to lend it because the second did not lend the second's sickle. And reading the words of Leviticus 19:18, "You shall not . . . bear any grudge," the Sifra defined the extent of the term "grudge." The Sifra taught that the term "grudge" applies to a case where one person asks to borrow a second's spade, and the second does not lend it, and then on the next day, the second asks the first to borrow the first's sickle, and the first consents to lend the sickle but taunts, "I am not like you, for you did not lend me your spade, but here, take the sickle!"

Reading the words of Leviticus 19:18, "You shall not take vengeance or bear any grudge against the sons of your own people," the Jerusalem Talmud asked what a practical illustration would be. The Gemara answered: If one was cutting meat, and the knife in one hand cut the other hand, would the person then go and cut the hand that held the knife?

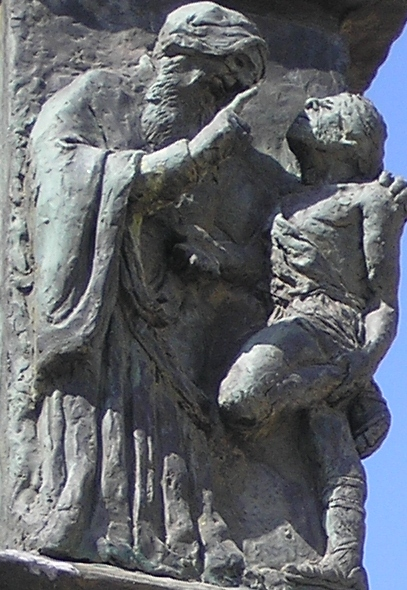
Hillel (sculpture at the Knesset Menorah, Jerusalem)

Once a gentile came before Shammai and said, "I will convert to Judaism, on the condition that you teach me the whole Torah while I stand on one foot." Shammai pushed him away with a builder's ruler. When the gentile repeated his challenge before Hillel, Hillel said to him (paraphrasing Leviticus 19:18), "What is hateful to you, do not do to your fellow. That is the whole Torah, and the rest is the explanation—go and learn it."

The Sifra reported that Rabbi Akiva taught that the words of Leviticus 19:18, "you shall love your neighbor as yourself," state the encompassing principle of the Torah. But Ben Azzai taught that the words of Genesis 5:1, "This is the book of the generations of Adam," state a still more encompassing principle. Similarly, a midrash reported that Ben Azzai taught that the words of Genesis 5:1, "This is the book of the descendants of Adam," teach a great principle of the Torah. But Rabbi Akiva replied that the words of Leviticus 19:18, "you shall love your neighbor as yourself," teach an even greater principle. Hence, one must not say, "Since I have been put to shame, let my neighbor be put to shame." And Rabbi Tanhuma taught that those who do so must know Whom they put to shame, for Genesis 1:27 reports of humankind, "In the likeness of God made He him."

The Gemara reported that a dilemma was raised before the Sages: Could a child operate on his parent? Would the child thus be liable for wounding the parent? Rav Mattana quoted Leviticus 19:18, "And you shall love your neighbor as yourself," and reasoned that just as people would want others to heal them when the need arises, they must heal others when the need arises. It is prohibited for one to do to others only those actions that one would not want done to oneself. Therefore, it is permitted for one to heal a parent even if the procedure entails wounding the parent.

Rav Naḥman said in the name of Rabbah bar Abbuha that Leviticus 19:18 requires that even when executing a person, one must choose for the condemned an easy death.

And other Rabbis counseled that Leviticus 19:18 prohibits taking actions that would make one's spouse unattractive. Thus Rav Judah said in the name of Rav that Leviticus 19:18 requires a man not to become engaged to a woman before he sees her, lest he subsequently see something in her that might make her repulsive to him. Similarly, Rav Hisda taught that Leviticus 19:18 prohibited one from engaging in marital relations during the daytime, and Abaye explained that this was because one might observe something that should make one's spouse repulsive.

Tractate Kilayim in the Mishnah, Tosefta, and Jerusalem Talmud interpreted the laws of mixing plants, cloth, and animals in Leviticus 19:19.

Reading Leviticus 18:4, "My ordinances (מִשְׁפָּטַי, mishpatai) shall you do, and My statutes (חֻקֹּתַי, chukotai) shall you keep," the Rabbis in a Baraita taught that the "ordinances" (מִשְׁפָּטִים, mishpatim) were commandments that logic would have dictated that we follow even had Scripture not commanded them, like the laws concerning idolatry, adultery, bloodshed, robbery, and blasphemy. And "statutes" (חֻקִּים, chukim) were commandments that the Adversary challenges us to violate as beyond reason, like those relating to wool-linen mixtures (שַׁעַטְנֵז, shatnez, prohibited by Leviticus 19:19 and Deuteronomy 22:11), release from levirate marriage (חליצה, chalitzah, mandated by Deuteronomy 25:5–10), purification of the person with tzaraat (in Leviticus 14), and the scapegoat (in Leviticus 16). So that people do not think these "ordinances" (מִשְׁפָּטִים, mishpatim) to be empty acts, in Leviticus 18:4, God says, "I am the Lord," indicating that the Lord made these statutes, and we have no right to question them. The Sifra reported the same discussion, and added eating pork (prohibited by Leviticus 11:7 and Deuteronomy 14:7–8) and purification of a person affected by skin disease (מְּצֹרָע, metzora, regulated in Leviticus 13–14). Similarly, Rabbi Joshua of Siknin taught in the name of Rabbi Levi that the Evil Inclination criticizes four laws as without logical basis, and Scripture uses the expression "statute" (chuk) in connection with each: the laws of (1) a brother's wife (in Deuteronomy 25:5–10), (2) mingled kinds (in Leviticus 19:19 and Deuteronomy 22:11), (3) the scapegoat (in Leviticus 16), and (4) the red cow (in Numbers 19).

Rabbi Eleazar ben Azariah taught that people should not say that they do not want to wear a wool-linen mixture (שַׁעַטְנֵז, shatnez, prohibited by Leviticus 19:19 and Deuteronomy 22:11), eat pork (prohibited by Leviticus 11:7 and Deuteronomy 14:7–8), or be intimate with forbidden partners (prohibited by Leviticus 18 and 20), but rather should say that they would love to, but God has decreed that they not do so. For in Leviticus 20:26, God says, "I have separated you from the nations to be mine." So one should separate from transgression and accept the rule of Heaven.

Hanina ben Hakinai employed the prohibition of Leviticus 19:19 to imagine how one could with one action violate up to nine separate commandments. One could (1) plow with an ox and a donkey yoked together (in violation of Deuteronomy 22:10) (2 and 3) that are two animals dedicated to the sanctuary, (4) plowing mixed seeds sown in a vineyard (in violation of Deuteronomy 22:9), (5) during a Sabbatical year (in violation of Leviticus 25:4), (6) on a Festival-day (in violation of, for example, Leviticus 23:7), (7) when the plower is a priest (in violation of Leviticus 21:1) and (8) a Nazirite (in violation of Numbers 6:6) plowing in a contaminated place. Chananya ben Chachinai said that the plower also may have been wearing a garment of wool and linen (in violation of Leviticus 19:19 and Deuteronomy 22:11). They said to him that this would not be in the same category as the other violations. He replied that neither is the Nazirite in the same category as the other violations.

Tractate Orlah in the Mishnah, Tosefta, and Jerusalem Talmud interpreted the laws of the prohibition in Leviticus 19:23–25 against using the fruits of a tree in its first three years.

Rav Zeira counted five kinds of orlah (things uncircumcised) in the world: (1) uncircumcised ears (as in Jeremiah 6:10), (2) uncircumcised lips (as in Exodus 6:12), (3) uncircumcised hearts (as in Deuteronomy 10:16 and Jeremiah 9:26), (4) uncircumcised flesh (as in Genesis 17:14), and (5) uncircumcised trees (as in Leviticus 19:23). Rav Zeira taught that all the nations are uncircumcised in each of the first four ways, and all the house of Israel are uncircumcised in heart, in that their hearts do not allow them to do God's will. And Rav Zeira taught that in the future, God will take away from Israel the uncircumcision of their hearts, and they will not harden their stubborn hearts anymore before their Creator, as Ezekiel 36:26 says, "And I will take away the stony heart out of your flesh, and I will give you an heart of flesh," and Genesis 17:11 says, "And you shall be circumcised in the flesh of your foreskin."

Judah ben Padiah noted Adam's frailty, for he could not remain loyal even for a single hour to God's charge that he not eat from the Tree of Knowledge of Good and Evil, yet in accordance with Leviticus 19:23, Adam's descendants the Israelites waited three years for the fruits of a tree.

The Mishnah taught that the commandments of Leviticus 19:27 not to round off the side-growth of one's head and not to destroy the corners of one's beard are two of only three exceptions to the general rule that every commandment that is a prohibition (whether time-dependent or not) governs both men and women. The other exception is the commandment of Leviticus 21:1 for Kohanim not to become ritually impure for the dead.

Rabbi Eliezer the Great taught that the Torah warns against wronging a stranger in 36, or others say 46, places (including Leviticus 19:33–34). The Gemara went on to cite Rabbi Nathan's interpretation of Exodus 22:20, "You shall neither wrong a stranger, nor oppress him; for you were strangers in the land of Egypt," to teach that one must not taunt another about a flaw that one has oneself.

The Gemara taught that the Torah three times prohibits verbally mistreating a convert—in Exodus 22:20, "And you shall neither mistreat a convert"; in Leviticus 19:33, "And when a convert lives in your land, you shall not mistreat him"; and in Leviticus 25:17, "And you shall not mistreat, each man his colleague." And the Torah similarly three times prohibits oppressing the convert—in Exodus 22:20, "And you shall neither mistreat a convert, nor oppress him"; in Exodus 23:9, "And you shall not oppress a convert"; and in Exodus 22:24, "And you shall not be to him like a creditor." Reading Exodus 22:20, "And you shall not mistreat a convert nor oppress him, because you were strangers in the land of Egypt," a baraita reported that Rabbi Nathan taught that one should not mention in another a defect that one has oneself. Thus, since the Jewish people were themselves strangers, they should not demean a convert because he is a stranger in their midst. And this explains the adage that one who has a person hanged in his family, does not say to another member of his household: Hang a fish for me, as the mention of hanging is demeaning for that family.

Rabbi Ḥiyya taught that the words of Leviticus 19:35, "You shall do no unrighteousness in judgment," apply to judgment in law. But a midrash noted that Leviticus 19:15 already mentioned judgment in law and questioned why Leviticus 19:35 would state the same proposition again and why Leviticus 19:35 uses the words, "in judgment, in measures." The midrash deduced that Leviticus 19:35 teaches that a person who measures is called a judge, and one who falsifies measurements is called by the five names "unrighteous," "hated," "repulsive," "accursed," and an "abomination," and is the cause of these five evils. Rabbi Banya said in the name of Rav Huna that the government comes and attacks that generation whose measures are false. The midrash found support for this from Proverbs 11:1, "A false balance is an abomination to the Lord," which is followed by Proverbs 11:2, "When presumption comes, then comes shame." Reading Micah 6:11, "Shall I be pure with wicked balances?" Rabbi Berekiah said in the name of Rabbi Abba that it is impossible for a generation whose measures are false to be meritorious, for Micah 6:11 continues, "And with a bag of deceitful weights" (showing that their holdings would be merely illusory). Rabbi Levi taught that Moses also hinted to Israel that a generation with false measures would be attacked. Deuteronomy 25:13–14 warns, "You shall not have in your bag diverse weights . . . you shall not have in your house diverse measures." But if one does, one will be attacked, as Deuteronomy 25:16, reports, "For all who do such things, even all who do unrighteously, are an abomination to the Lord your God," and then immediately following, Deuteronomy 25:17 says, "Remember what Amalek did to you (attacking Israel) by the way as you came forth out of Egypt."

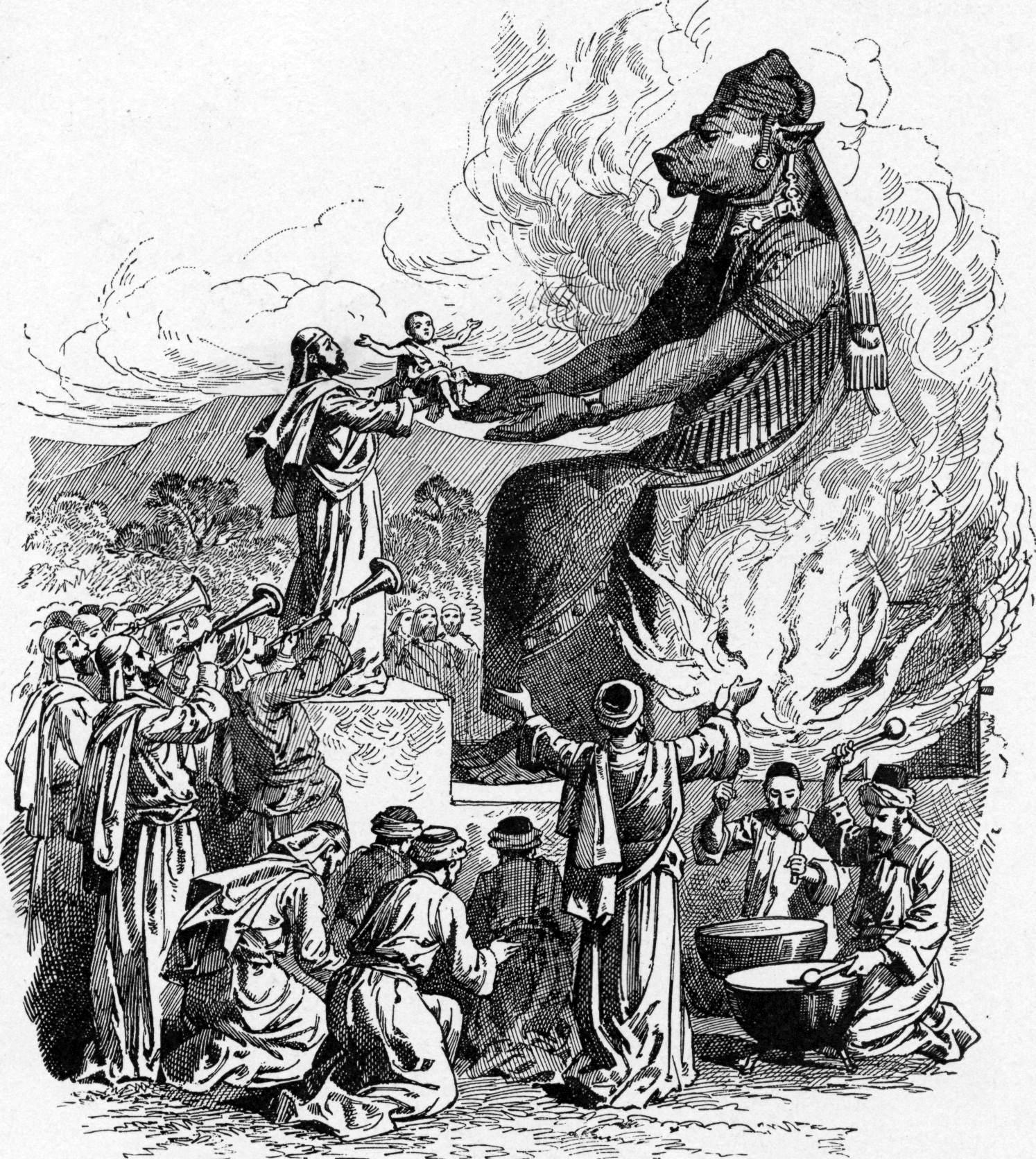
Offering to Molech (illustration from the 1897 Bible Pictures and What They Teach Us by Charles Foster)

=== Leviticus chapter 20 ===
Mishnah Sanhedrin and Babylonian Talmud Sanhedrin interpreted the laws prohibiting passing one's child through the fire to Molech in Leviticus 18:21 and 20:1–5 and Deuteronomy 18:10.

The Mishnah asked about the command of Leviticus 20:15–16 that the animal be killed: If the person had sinned, in what way did the animal sin? The Mishnah concluded that Scripture ordered it killed because it enticed the person to sin. Alternatively, the Mishnah explained that the animal was killed so that it should not pass through the streets provoking people to say, "This is the animal on account of which so and so was stoned."

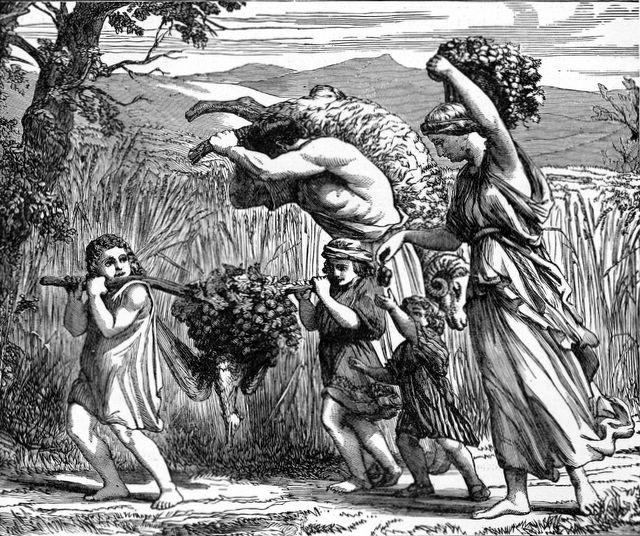
A Land Flowing with Milk and Honey (illustration from Henry Davenport Northrop's 1894 Treasures of the Bible)

The Gemara reported a number of Rabbis' reports of how the Land of Israel did indeed flow with "milk and honey," as described in Exodus 3:8 and 17, 13:5, and 33:3, Leviticus 20:24, Numbers 13:27 and 14:8, and Deuteronomy 6:3, 11:9, 26:9 and 15, 27:3, and 31:20. Once when Rami bar Ezekiel visited Bnei Brak, he saw goats grazing under fig trees while honey was flowing from the figs, and milk dripped from the goats mingling with the fig honey, causing him to remark that it was indeed a land flowing with milk and honey. Rabbi Jacob ben Dostai said that it is about three miles from Lod to Ono, and once he rose up early in the morning and waded all that way up to his ankles in fig honey. Resh Lakish said that he saw the flow of the milk and honey of Sepphoris extend over an area of sixteen miles by sixteen miles. Rabbah bar Bar Hana said that he saw the flow of the milk and honey in all the Land of Israel and the total area was equal to an area of twenty-two parasangs by six parasangs.

== In medieval Jewish interpretation ==
The parashah is discussed in these medieval Jewish sources:

=== Leviticus chapter 19 ===
Baḥya ibn Paquda argued that parents' beneficence to their children is motivated by the parents' own interest, for parents' chief hope is centered in their offspring. Nevertheless, the Torah and reason impose upon children the duty of serving, honoring, and revering their parents, as Leviticus 19:3 says, "You shall, everyone, revere his father and his mother." And these duties are enjoined despite that the parents are impelled by an instinct, and the good comes from God, while the parents are only God's agents. How much more then, Baḥya reasoned, does a person owe service, praise, and gratitude to the God who created the benefit and the benefactors, whose beneficence is unlimited, permanent, without self-interest, but only an expression of grace and loving-kindness emanating from God towards all human beings.

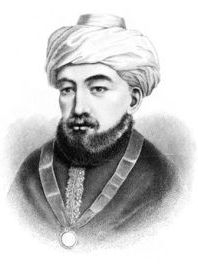
Maimonides

Reading Leviticus 19:17, "Do not hate your brother in your heart," Maimonides taught that whoever hates a fellow Jew in his heart transgresses a Torah prohibition. Maimonides taught that when someone wrongs you, you should not remain silent and despise that person. Rather, you must make the matter known and ask the person: "Why did you do this to me?" "Why did you wrong me regarding that matter?" as Leviticus 19:17 states: "You shall surely admonish your colleague." If, afterwards, the person who committed the wrong asks you to forgive, you must do so. One should not be cruel when forgiving. Maimonides taught that it is a commandment for a person who sees that a fellow Jew has sinned or is following an improper path to attempt to correct the other's behavior and to inform the other, as Leviticus 19:17 states: "You shall surely admonish your colleague." A person who rebukes a colleague—whether because of a wrong committed against the person or because of a matter between the colleague and God—should rebuke the colleague privately. The person should speak to the colleague patiently and gently, informing the colleague that the person is only making these statements for the colleague's own welfare, to allow the colleague to merit the life of the World to Come. If the colleague accepts the rebuke, it is good; if not, the person should rebuke the colleague a second and third time. Indeed, you are obligated to rebuke a colleague who does wrong until the colleague strikes you and tells you: "I will not listen." Whoever has the possibility of rebuking sinners and fails to do so is considered responsible for the sin, for the person had the opportunity to rebuke the sinners. Maimonides taught that at first, a person who admonishes a colleague should not speak to the colleague harshly so that the colleague becomes embarrassed, as Leviticus 19:17 states: "You should . . . not bear a sin because of him." It is forbidden for a person to embarrass a fellow Jew, and even more to embarrass a fellow Jew in public. This applies to matters between one person and another. In regard to spiritual matters, however, if a transgressor does not repent after being admonished in private, the transgressor may be shamed in public, and the transgressor's sin may be publicized. Maimonides taught that such a transgressor may be subjected to abuse, scorn, and curses until the transgressor repents, as was the practice of the prophets of Israel. But Maimonides taught that it is pious behavior for a person who was wronged by a colleague not to admonish the offender or mention the matter at all because the offender was very boorish or because the offender was mentally disturbed, provided that the person forgives the offender totally without bearing any feelings of hate or admonishing the offender. Leviticus 19:17 is concerned only with those who carry feelings of hate.

Maimonides taught that a person who takes revenge against a colleague transgresses a Torah prohibition, as Leviticus 19:18 states: "Do not take revenge." One should train oneself to rise above one's feelings about all worldly things, for people of understanding consider all these things as vanity and emptiness for which it is not worth seeking revenge. Paraphrasing the Sifra (reported in "In classical rabbinic interpretation: Chapter 19" above), Maimonides taught that taking revenge includes the case where a colleague asks a person to borrow a hatchet and the person refuses to lend it. On the following day, the person who refused asks to borrow a hatchet from his colleague. The colleague responds that just as the person did not lend it to the colleague, the colleague will not lend it to the person. This is considered taking revenge. Instead, when the person comes to ask for the hatchet, the colleague should give it to the person with a full heart, without repaying the person for what the person did. Similarly, Maimonides taught that anyone who holds a grudge against another Jew violates a Torah prohibition, as Leviticus 19:18 states: "Do not bear a grudge against the children of your people." Once again paraphrasing the Sifra (above), Maimonides taught that bearing a grudge includes the case where Reuven asked Shimon to rent Shimon's house to Reuven or lend an ox to him, and Shimon was not willing to do so. A few days later, Shimon came to borrow or rent something from Reuven, and Reuven told Shimon, "Here, it is. I am lending it to you. I am not like you, nor am I paying you back for what you did." A person who acts this way violates the prohibition against bearing a grudge. Instead, the person should wipe the matter from the person's heart and never bring it to mind. As long as the person brings the matter to mind and remembers it, there is the possibility that the person will seek revenge. Therefore, Leviticus 19:18 condemned holding a grudge, requiring one to wipe the wrong from one's heart entirely. Maimonides taught that this quality permits a stable environment, trade, and commerce to be established among people.

Reading Leviticus 19:18, "Love your neighbor as yourself," Maimonides taught that all Jews are commanded to love all other Jews as themselves. Therefore, they should speak the praises of others and show concern for their money just as they do with their own money and their own honor. Maimonides taught that whoever gains honor through the degradation of a colleague does not have a share in the World to Come. Maimonides taught that the commandment of Leviticus 19:18, "Love your neighbor as yourself," implies that whatever you would like other people to do for you, you should do for your comrade in the Torah and mitzvot. Maimonides taught that the commandment of Leviticus 19:18 thus includes the commandments of Rabbinic origin to visit the sick, comfort mourners, to prepare for a funeral, prepare a bride, accompany guests, attend to all the needs of a burial, carry a corpse on one shoulders, walk before the bier, mourn, dig a grave, and bury the dead, and also to bring joy to a bride and groom and help them in all their needs.

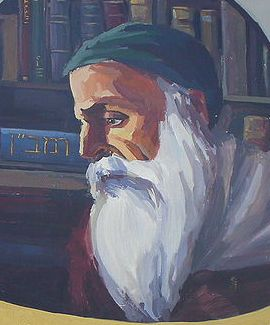
Naḥmanides

Naḥmanides, in contrast, read the words of Leviticus 19:18, "And you shall love your neighbor as yourself," as an overstatement. Naḥmanides taught that the human heart is unable to accept a command to love one's neighbor as oneself. Noting that Rabbi Akiva taught that one's life takes precedence over the life of one's fellow, Naḥmanides read Leviticus 19:18 to means that one is to love one's fellow as one loves all good for oneself. Naḥmanides taught that if one loved one's neighbor completely, one would want the friend to gain riches, properties, honor, knowledge, and wisdom. But because of human nature, one would still not want the neighbor to be one's equal, for one would always have a desire that one should have more of these good things than the neighbor. Therefore, Leviticus 19:18 commanded that this degrading jealousy should not exist in one's heart, but instead one should love to do good abundantly for one's fellow as one does for oneself, and one should place no limitations upon one's love for one's fellow.

Citing Leviticus 19:18, Baḥya ibn Paquda taught that not to avenge or bear a grudge is a leading example of a negative commandment among the duties of the heart and that to love one’s fellow is an affirmative duty of the heart. Baḥya further noted that many of the commandments are included in the words, "love your fellow as yourself."

Baḥya taught that those who trust in God who have families, relatives, friends, and even enemies, should strive to fulfill their duties to them, do their wishes, and be wholehearted with them. They should avoid causing them any harm and try to promote their interests. They should deal faithfully towards them in all matters and teach them the ways that will be beneficial for them in religious and secular matters. And they should do all this to serve God, as Leviticus 19:18 says, "you shall love your neighbor as yourself," and "do not hate your brother in your heart." They should not do this out of hope for future benefits from them or to pay them back for past benefits. Nor should they do this out of love of being honored or praised by them, or out of desire to have authority over them, but rather with the sole motive to fulfill God's commandment. Baḥya taught that God will help their beneficiaries to repay them in this world, God will cause their beneficiaries to praise them, and they will attain great reward in the World To Come.

Reading Leviticus 19:30, "Revere My Sanctuary," Maimonides argued that the main object of the Sanctuary was to inspire reverence and awe in those who came to it. But constant contact with the Sanctuary would diminish its emotional impact. To avoid this, God barred impure people from the Sanctuary, so that visiting it would be rare. Maimonides noted that many events kept one out of the Sanctuary—contact with a corpse (Leviticus 11:27), touching one of the eight kinds of vermin (Leviticus 11:29–30), having skin disease (Leviticus 13:46), touching one with skin disease (Leviticus 13:46), touching one oozing flux (Leviticus 15:2), touching the bedding of one with skin disease (Leviticus 15:5), touching a menstruant woman (Leviticus 15:18), having a nocturnal emission, or having sexual relations. All these events kept people out of the Sanctuary, preventing merely casual visits. Maimonides reasoned that there are so many causes of impurity that few people would have been ritually pure, thus preserving the exceptional nature of a visit to the Sanctuary.

=== Leviticus chapter 20 ===
Baḥya ibn Paquda read Leviticus 20:4 to teach that God sends observable punishments for the commission of observable sins. Baḥya taught that God rewards the fulfillment of observable duties with visible rewards in this world. While for fulfillment of inner, hidden duties, God rewards with hidden rewards, that is, in the World To Come. And God's punishments for hidden and revealed misdeeds is similar. This can be seen in how God has guaranteed to God's people that for their visible service, God will give them visible and swift rewards in this world, as God explained in Leviticus 26:3–12, "If you will go in My ways . . . ." Likewise, for visible sins, God sends visible punishment in this world, because most people understand only what is visible and not what is hidden, as Deuteronomy 29:28 says: "the hidden things belong to God, but the revealed things belong to us and to our children, forever." And Leviticus 20:4 says "if the people will turn their eyes away from the [evil] acts of this man and his family, I will turn My face to this man and his family." Hence, Baḥya taught, the reward and punishment for the fulfillment or transgression of the duties of the heart belongs to God, and consequently, Scripture omits an explanation of their reward and punishment in the World To Come.

== In modern interpretation ==
The parashah is discussed in these modern sources:

=== Leviticus chapter 19 ===
In 1877, August Klostermann observed the singularity of Leviticus 17–26 as a collection of laws and designated it the "Holiness Code."

John Gammie ranked Leviticus 19 as one of the high points of Hebrew Bible ethics, along with Amos 5, Micah 6, Ezekiel 18, and Job 31.

In 1950, the Committee on Jewish Law and Standards of Conservative Judaism ruled: "Refraining from the use of a motor vehicle is an important aid in the maintenance of the Sabbath spirit of repose. Such restraint aids, moreover, in keeping the members of the family together on the Sabbath. However where a family resides beyond reasonable walking distance from the synagogue, the use of a motor vehicle for the purpose of synagogue attendance shall in no wise be construed as a violation of the Sabbath but, on the contrary, such attendance shall be deemed an expression of loyalty to our faith. . . . [I]n the spirit of a living and developing Halachah responsive to the changing needs of our people, we declare it to be permitted to use electric lights on the Sabbath for the purpose of enhancing the enjoyment of the Sabbath, or reducing personal discomfort in the performance of a mitzvah." In 2023, the Committee on Jewish Law and Standards reexamined the issue of driving on Shabbat and concluded that using an electric car for Shabbat purposes is not a violation of Shabbat, although the Committee encouraged walking or riding a bicycle, when possible.

The Committee on Jewish Law and Standards of the Conservative Movement noted that based on Leviticus 19:16, "Nor shall you stand idly by the blood of your fellow," the Talmud expands the obligation to provide medical aid to encompass expenditure of financial resources for that purpose. The Committee noted that the Rabbis taught that God both authorizes us and requires us to heal. The Rabbis found that authorization and imperative in Exodus 21:19–20, according to which an assailant must ensure that the victim is "thoroughly healed," and Deuteronomy 22:2, "And you shall restore the lost property to him." The Talmud understood Exodus 21:19–20 to give "permission for the physician to cure." Based on an extra letter in the Hebrew text of Deuteronomy 22:2, the Talmud found the obligation to restore other people's bodies as well as their property, and hence found an obligation to come to the aid of someone in a life-threatening situation. The Committee thus concluded that Jewish law requires that individuals and families, physicians and other health care providers, and the community provide people with at least a decent minimum of health care that preserves life and meets other basic needs. The Committee concluded that the national society bears ultimate responsibility to assure provision of needed health care for people who cannot afford it, and Jewish citizens should support (by lobbying and other means) societal institutions that will fulfill that responsibility.

William Dever noted that most of the 100 linen and wool fragments, likely textiles used for cultic purposes, that archeologists found at Kuntillet Ajrud in the Sinai Desert (where the climate may better preserve organic materials) adhered to the regulations in Leviticus 19:19 and Deuteronomy 22:11.

Dever explained that the Hebrew term in Leviticus 19:36 for "balance," מֹאזְנַיִם, moznayim, is a dual noun that means "ears," apparently because one could see the flanking balance-pans as resembling two ears. Dever argued that varieties of sheqel weights that archeologists found in well-stratified archaeological contexts of the late 8th and early 7th centuries help to explain texts like Leviticus 19:36 that refer to the balances with which Israelites used the weights. Dever concluded that the doctored weights that archeologists found give these passages the ring of truth as calling for the reform of an economic system that actually existed.

=== Leviticus chapter 20 ===
Leading modern authorities in different Jewish religious movements differ in their interpretation of the law on homosexuality in Leviticus 18:22 and 20:13. From Orthodox Judaism, in 2010, four leaders of the Rabbi Isaac Elchanan Theological Seminary of Yeshiva University posted a statement saying that the Torah absolutely prohibits homosexual behavior, and with respect to homosexuality, the study of Torah will place observant Jews at odds with political correctness and the temper of the times, but they must be honest with themselves and with God, regardless of the consequences. In 1977, the Central Conference of American Rabbis of Reform Judaism adopted a resolution encouraging legislation to decriminalize homosexual acts between consenting adults and prohibit discrimination against them. In 2006, the Committee on Jewish Law and Standards of Conservative Judaism approved by a 13-to-12 vote a responsum that held while that the explicit biblical ban on anal sex between men remains in effect, for homosexuals who are incapable of maintaining a heterosexual relationship, the rabbinic prohibitions that have been associated with other gay and lesbian intimate acts are superseded based upon the Talmudic principle of the obligation to preserve the human dignity of all people, in effect normalizing the status of gay and lesbian Jews in the Jewish community, while explicitly not ruling on the question of gay marriage. Then in 2013, the Central Conference of American Rabbis Responsa Committee adopted a responsum holding that Reform rabbis officiate with the full support of the CCAR at the marriage ceremonies of Jews of the same sex and Reform rabbis may consider these same-sex marriages to be kiddushin, utilizing in the marriage ceremony the Jewish forms and rites that are most appropriate to the partners involved.

Nathan MacDonald reported some dispute over the exact meaning of the description of the Land of Israel as a "land flowing with milk and honey," as in Leviticus 20:24, as well as Exodus 3:8 and 17, 13:5, and 33:3, Numbers 13:27 and 14:8, and Deuteronomy 6:3, 11:9, 26:9 and 15, 27:3, and 31:20. MacDonald wrote that the term for milk (חָלָב, chalav) could easily be the word for "fat" (חֵלֶב, chelev), and the word for honey (דְבָשׁ, devash) could indicate not bees' honey but a sweet syrup made from fruit. The expression evoked a general sense of the bounty of the land and suggested an ecological richness exhibited in several ways, not just with milk and honey. MacDonald noted that the expression was always used to describe a land that the people of Israel had not yet experienced, and thus characterized it as always a future expectation.

== Commandments ==
According to Sefer ha-Chinuch, there are 13 positive and 38 negative commandments in the parashah:

- To revere one's father and mother
- Not to turn to idolatry
- Not to make an idol
- Not to eat meat left over from sacrifices
- Not to reap a corner of one's field, so that the poor may glean
- Not to reap the very last end of one's field, so that the poor may glean
- To leave gleanings for the poor

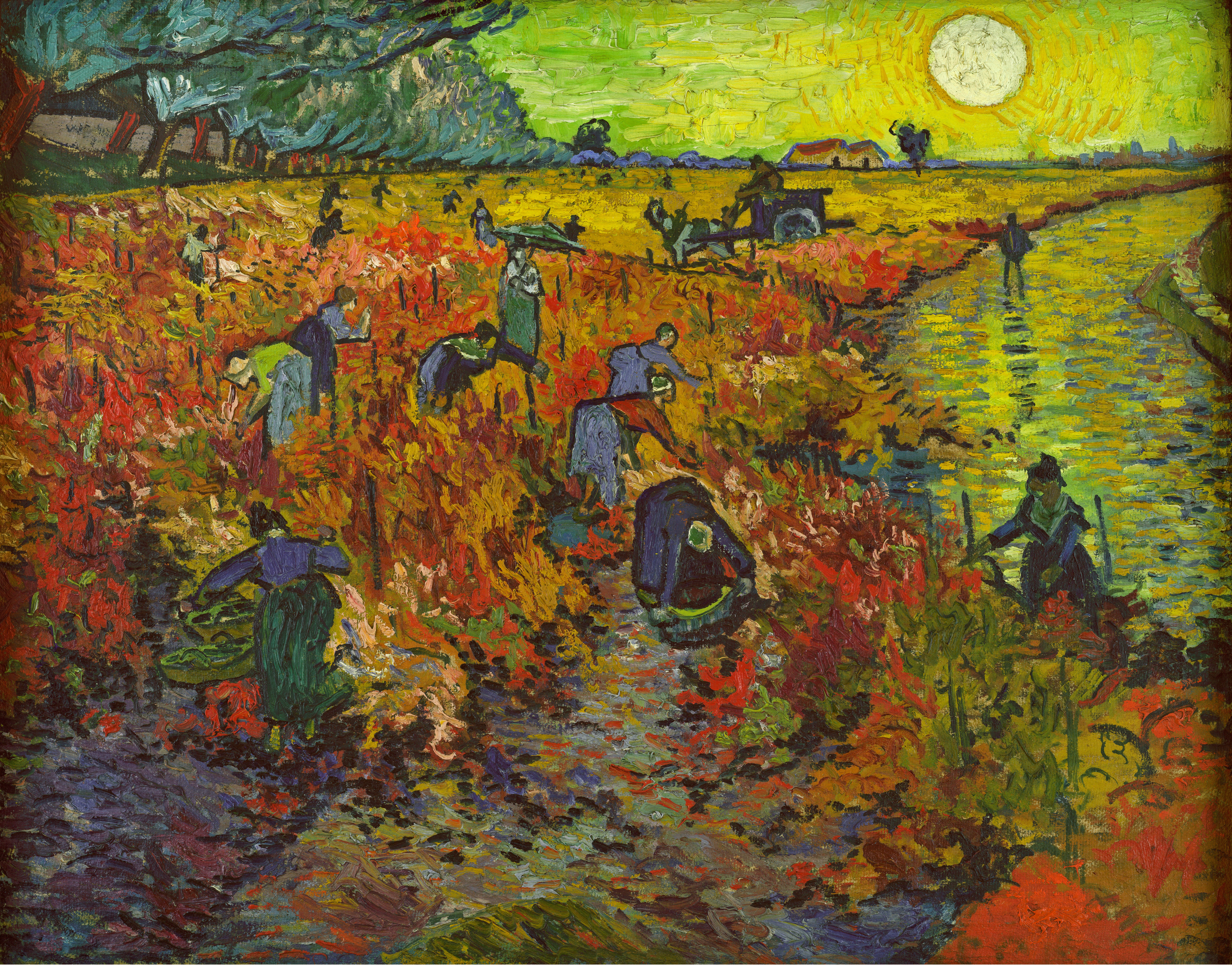
The Red Vineyard (painting by Vincent van Gogh)

- Not to gather the gleanings, so that the poor may take them
- To leave a part of a vineyard unreaped, for the poor
- Not to gather the gleanings of a vineyard, so that the poor may take them
- To leave the unformed clusters of grapes for the poor
- Not to steal
- Not to deny possession of something entrusted to you
- Not to swear in denial of a monetary claim
- Not to swear falsely in God's Name
- Not to withhold wages or fail to repay a debt
- Not to rob or defraud one's neighbor
- Not to delay payment of wages past the agreed time
- Not to curse any upstanding Jew
- Not to put a stumbling block before nor give harmful advice (lifnei iver) to a trusting person
- Not to pervert justice
- A judge must not respect the great man at the trial.
- To judge righteously
- Not to speak derogatorily of others
- Not to stand idly by if someone's life is in danger
- Not to hate fellow Jew
- To reprove a sinner
- Not to embarrass others
- Not to take revenge
- Not to bear a grudge
- To love others as one loves oneself
- Not to crossbreed animals
- Not to plant diverse seeds together
- Not to eat fruit of a tree during its first three years
- The fourth-year crops must be totally for holy purposes.
- Not to eat like a glutton or drink like a drunkard
- Not to be superstitious
- Not to engage in astrology
- Men must not shave the hair off the sides of their head.
- Men must not shave their beards with a razor.
- Not to tattoo the skin
- To show reverence to the Temple
- Not to act as a medium
- Not to act as a magical seer
- To honor those who teach and know Torah
- Not to commit injustice with scales and weights
- All must ensure that their scales and weights are accurate
- Not to curse one's father or mother
- The courts must carry out the death penalty of burning
- Not to imitate idolaters in customs and clothing

== In the liturgy ==
God's characteristic of holiness in Leviticus 19:2 is reflected in Isaiah 6:2–3 and in turn in the Kedushah section of the Amidah prayer in each of the three prayer services.

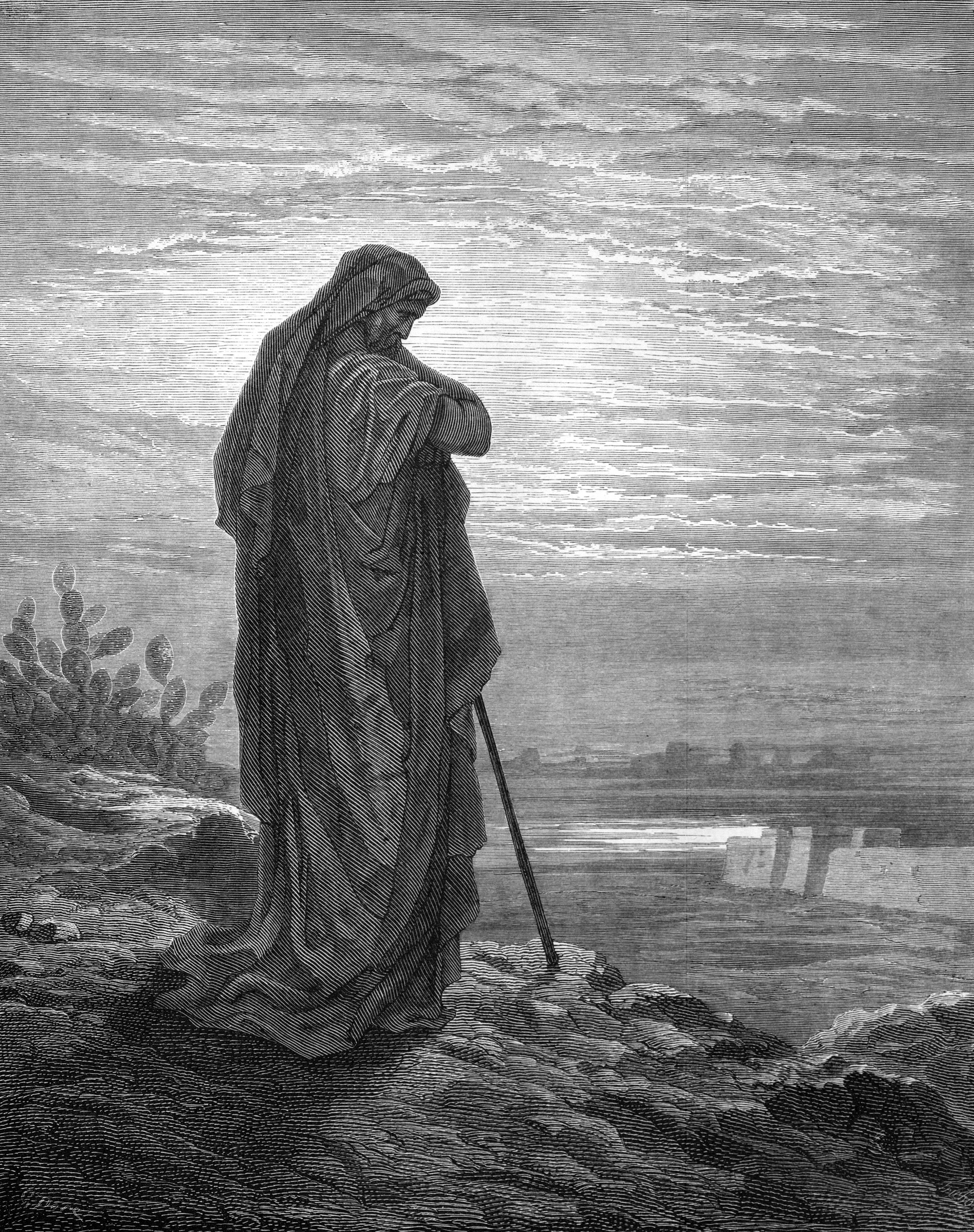
Amos (engraving by Gustave Doré from the 1865 La Sainte Bible)

Following the example if the 16th century mystic Isaac Luria, some Jews recite each day an acceptance of the obligation of Leviticus 19:18 to love one's neighbor as one's self.

== Haftarah ==
The haftarah for the parashah is:

- for Ashkenazi Jews: Amos 9:7–15
- for Sephardi Jews: Ezekiel 20:2–20

When Parashat Kedoshim is combined with Parashat Acharei (as it is in non-leap years, for example, 2025 and 2026), the haftarah for the week is that for Parashat Kedoshim.

== See also ==
- Conservative Judaism and sexual orientation
