= Mishloach manot =

Foodstuff gifts distributed on the Jewish holiday of Purim

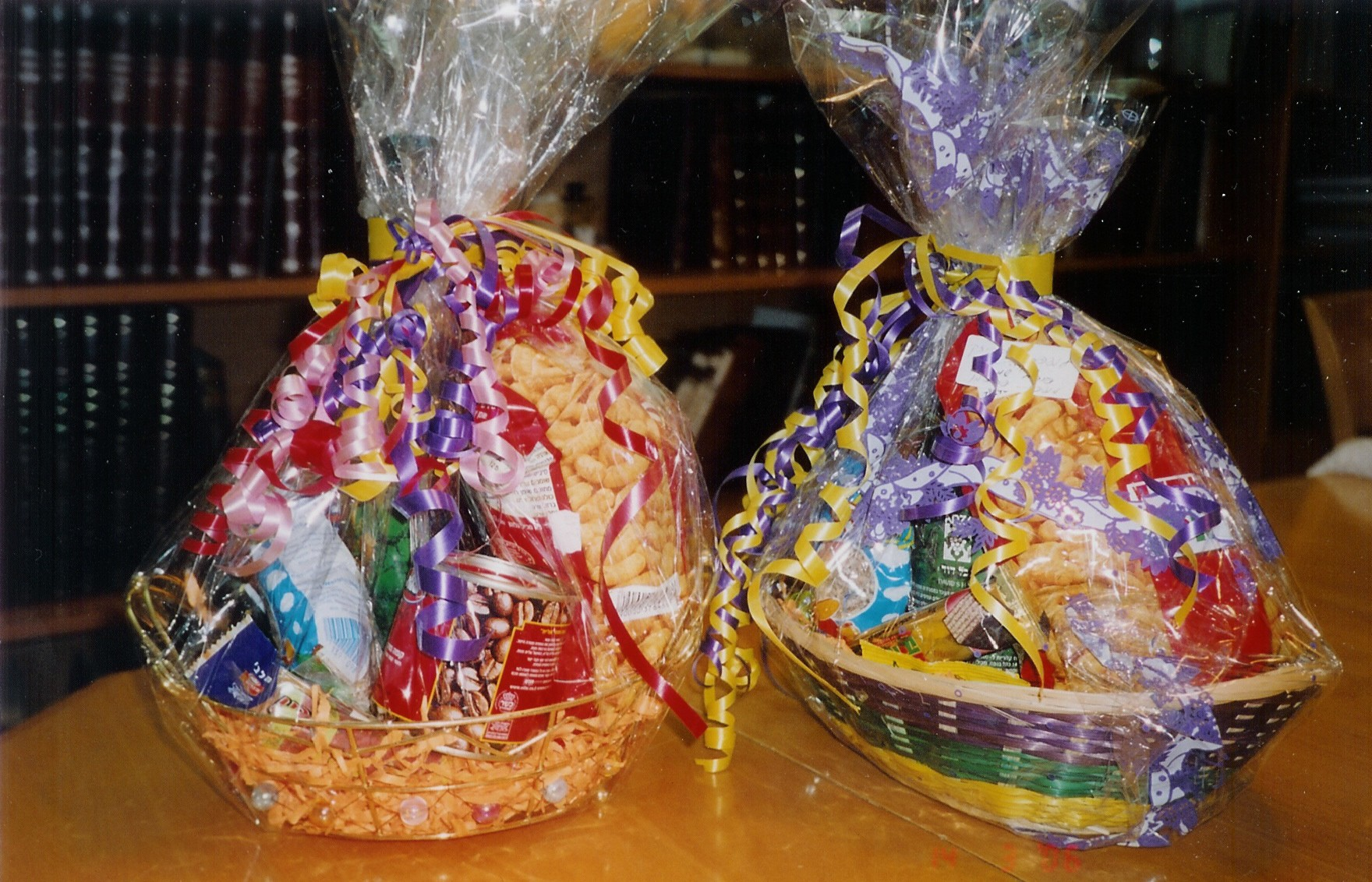
Colorfully wrapped baskets of sweets, drinks and other foodstuffs given as mishloach manot on Purim day

Mishloach manot (Hebrew: משלוח מנות [miʃˈlo.aχ maˈnot], literally, 'sending of portions'; also spelled and pronounced mishloach manos), or sh(a)lach mones (Yiddish: שלח־מנות Yiddish pronunciation: [ʃ(a)ɫaχˈmɔnəs]), also called a Purim basket, are gifts of food or drink that are sent to family, friends and others on Purim day. The mitzvah of giving mishloach manot derives from the Book of Esther. It is meant to ensure that everyone has enough food for the Purim feast held later in the day, and to increase love and friendship among Jews and their neighbors.

According to the halakha, every Jew over the age of Bar and Bat Mitzvah should send a food gift consisting of two different types of food to at least one recipient. The practice is a fairly prominent feature of Purim.

In Israel, it is a fairly common practice to send mishloach manot to Israel Defense Forces soldiers; it is usually done by the relatives of said soldiers, though children also send mishloach manot often to unrelated soldiers.

== Sources ==
The mitzvah of giving mishloach manot is derived from the Book of Esther, which enjoins the Jewish people to observe the days of Purim "as days of feasting and gladness, and sending portions of food to one another, and gifts to the poor" (9:22). This verse refers to three different mitzvot: eating a Purim meal, the sending of two different, ready-to-eat foods and/or drinks to one friend (known by the Hebrew term, mishloach manot), and the distribution of two charitable donations (either money or food) to two poor people.

In actual practice, many individuals fulfill the first mitzvah themselves (by sending food gifts to friends, neighbors, relatives, etc.), and the second mitzvah by contributing to charitable organisations which distribute money or food to the poor on Purim day.

Poor people are also required to give mishloach manot. One who cannot afford to buy food for his friend may exchange his own food with that of his friend—this fulfills both their obligations.

This mitzvah can only be fulfilled by giving food. Money or other material items cannot suffice.

== Laws of giving ==
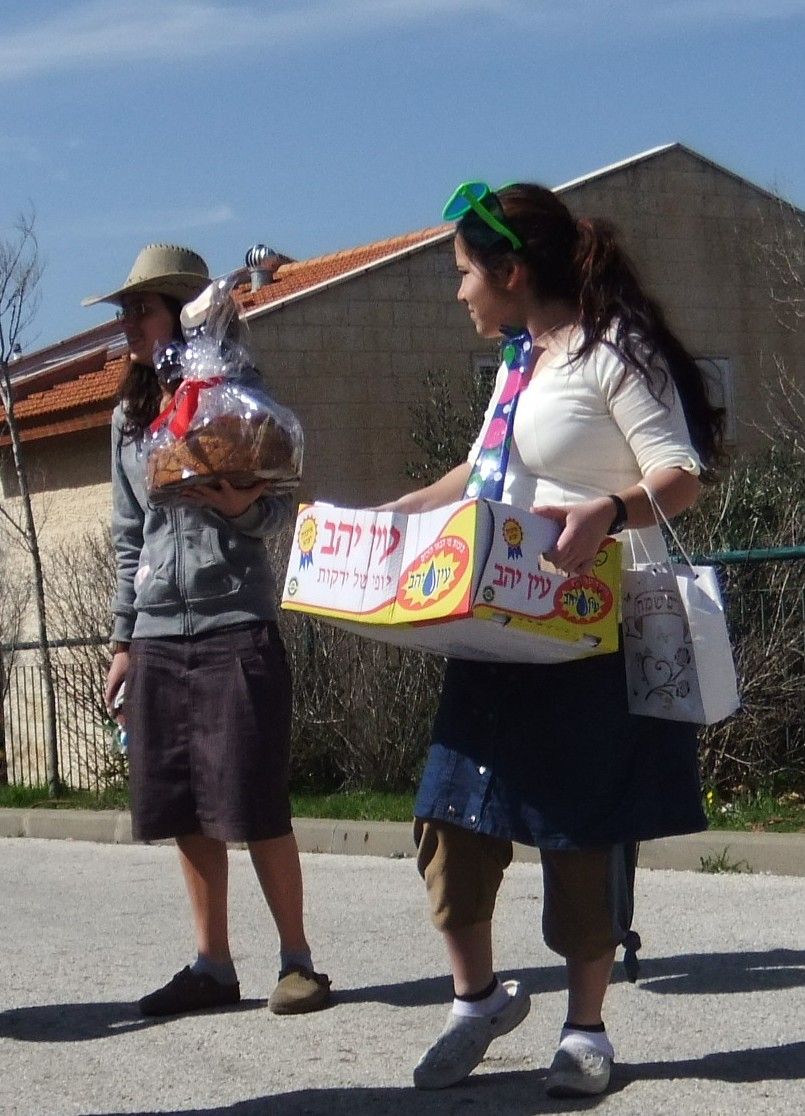
Delivering mishloach manot in Ofra, Israel

The following halachot apply to the giving of mishloach manot:

- Mishloach manot must be sent and delivered during the daylight hours of Purim.
- According to most opinions, the sender and recipient should be observing the same day of Purim.
- Children over the age of six or seven are also encouraged to send mishloach manot to their friends as training for the performance of a mitzvah.
- Mishloach manot are not sent to a mourner. The mourner himself is obligated to send mishloach manot, but the package should not be too elaborate. According to some opinions, a mourner should send to only one person.
- Mishloach manot can be delivered personally, but it is customary to deliver the food packages via a third party. Children are often involved in this mitzvah as the go-betweens between the giving parties, and are rewarded with sweets and treats for their efforts.
- One is not obligated to send mishloach manot as a reciprocal gesture to the sender.
- While the halacha only calls for the giving of two food gifts to one friend, a person who gives mishloach manot to more than one person is called praiseworthy. However, it is better to give more charity on Purim day than to spend more money on elaborate mishloach manot.

== Choice of foods ==
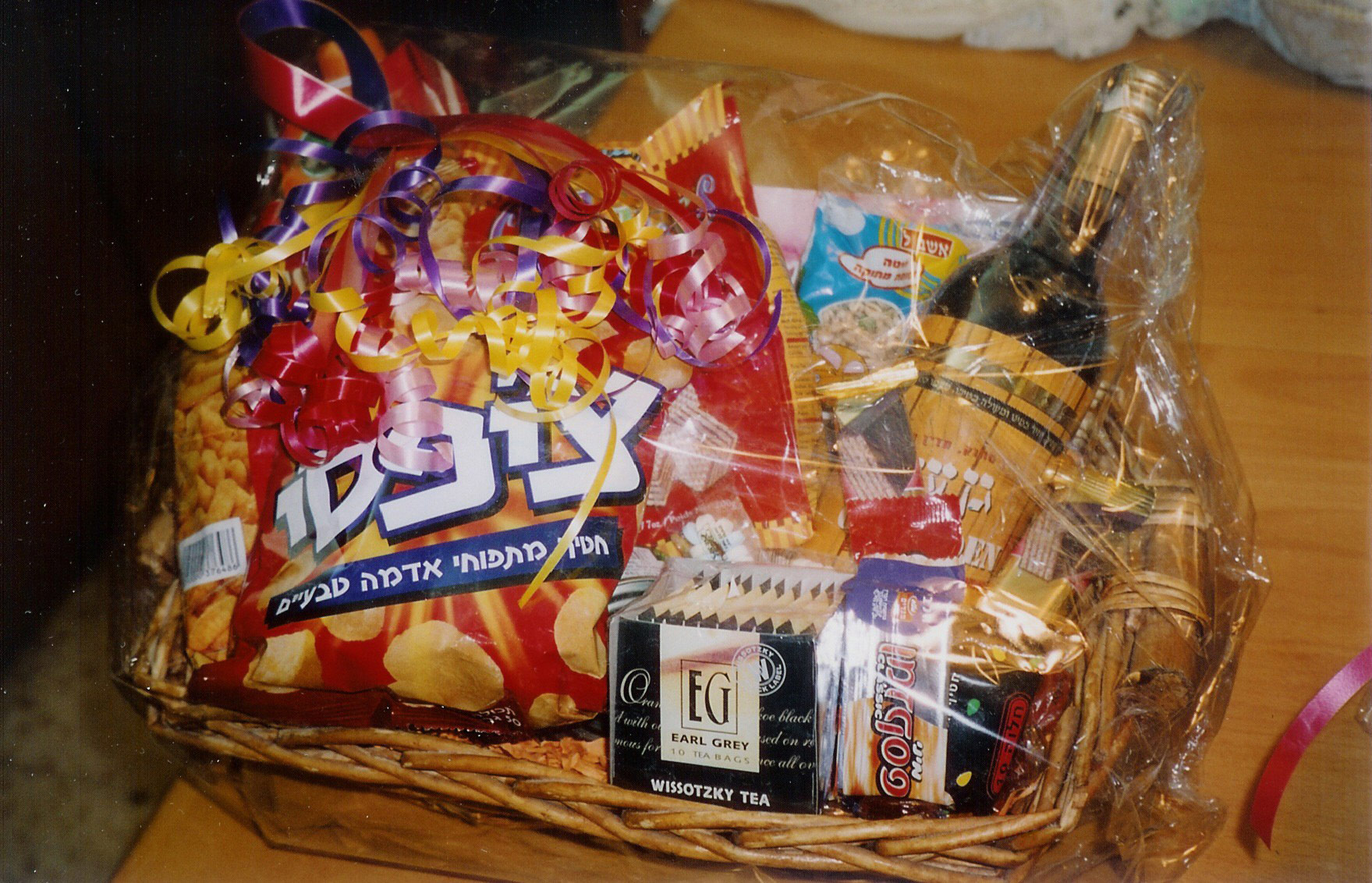
Sending two different items (such as bags of candy or bottles of wine) that are ready-to-consume fulfills the Mitzvah, but more may be included, including items (such as tea bags) which need preparation and so do not count towards the Mitzvah.

Mishloach manot can include any food or beverage (except water) that is ready to eat or drink. A bottle of soft drinks or a bag of potato chips fulfills this criterion; raw meat or a package of uncooked grains does not. Mishloach manot baskets typically include wine and pastries (especially hamentashen); alternatively, cooked dishes, canned foods, salads, snack foods, sweets and fruits may be sent. Though a common perception holds that the two foods of mishloach manot must carry different brachot (blessings), this has no source in halakha. One may give two different types of fruits, such as an apple and an orange, but not two of the same fruit, such as two apples.

The amount of food in each mishloach manot package should reflect the standards of both the giver and the receiver. A wealthy person should send a nicer package to his recipients than would a poor person. Similarly, one should send a nicer portion to a wealthy person than to a poor person.

Terumat Hadeshen of Israel Isserlein requires the foods to be fit for use at the festive Purim meal, held later in the day, as this is the purpose of mishloach manot. Some cite the Manot Halevi of Shlomo Halevi Alkabetz, who states that the purpose is merely to "increase peace and friendship", as a defence to their sending foods such as candy, pretzels and similar treats to fulfill their requirement. Tzvi Pesach Frank asserts that the position of the Manot Halevi is not to be taken as a counter to that of the Terumat Hadeshen, but rather in addition to it.

== As a fundraiser ==
The sending of mishloach manot has also evolved into a fundraising device by many Jewish organisations and institutions. Synagogues, Jewish schools and youth organizations run "Mishloach Manot Fundraisers" which coordinate the sending of food baskets to their various members, accompanied by a card listing the names of other members who contributed toward the gift. Each member submits a list of the names he wishes to send to, along with a set fee to the organisation for each name, thus netting the organisation a small profit. In this way, an individual can fulfill his social obligations to many fellow members without having to buy, wrap and deliver the food gift personally.

Other charitable groups collect outright donations and, in return, send the donor cards which he can send to his own recipients. A £10 donor might receive three cards, while a £20 donor receives six, etc. Donors sign and mail the pre-printed cards, which state, "In lieu of mishloach manot, a donation has been made in your name to such-and-such organisation." While such a donation does not qualify as fulfillment of the mitzvah of mishloach manot, it is used by many people as a solution to the challenge of having to give food baskets to all the people they know.
