= Monkey bread =

American pull-apart pastry

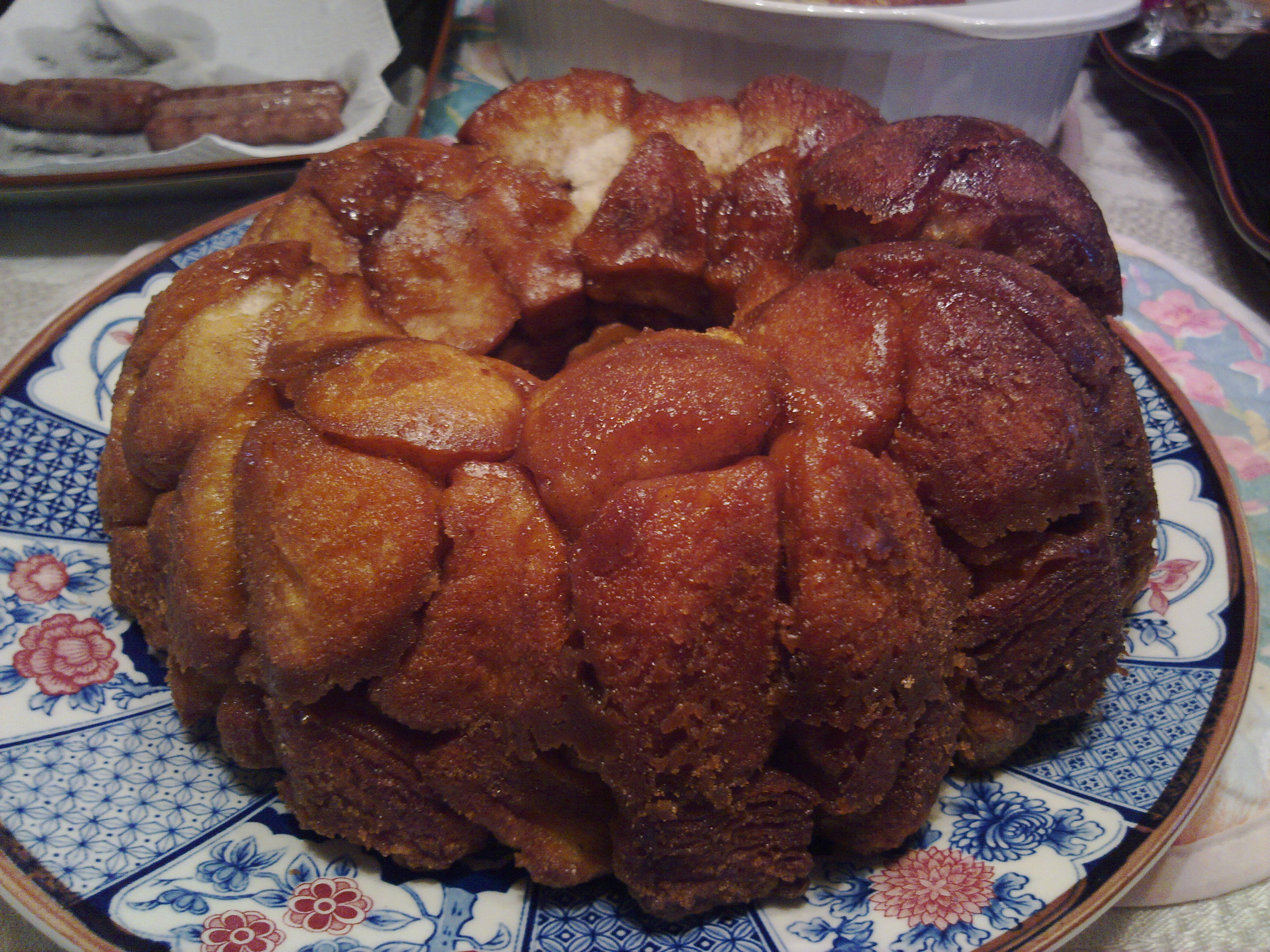
- Alternative names: Pull-apart bread, bubble bread, Christmas morning delights
- Type: Bread
- Course: Breakfast
- Place of origin: Hungary
- Main ingredients: Bread flour
- Food energy (per serving): 352 kcal (1,470 kJ)
Nutritional value
(per serving)
- Protein: 4 g
- Fat: 15 g
- Carbohydrate: 51 g

Monkey bread (also known by other names including plucking cake, pull-apart bread, and bubble bread) is a bread originating from Hungary that consists of soft pieces of baked dough that can be pulled apart to be eaten and does not need utensils. The bread is usually baked in a Bundt pan, with a hole in the center often filled with dips, jams, or preserves. A common version served at fairs and festivals, or eaten for breakfast or at midmorning, is a soft, sweet, sticky cinnamon bread.

== Name ==
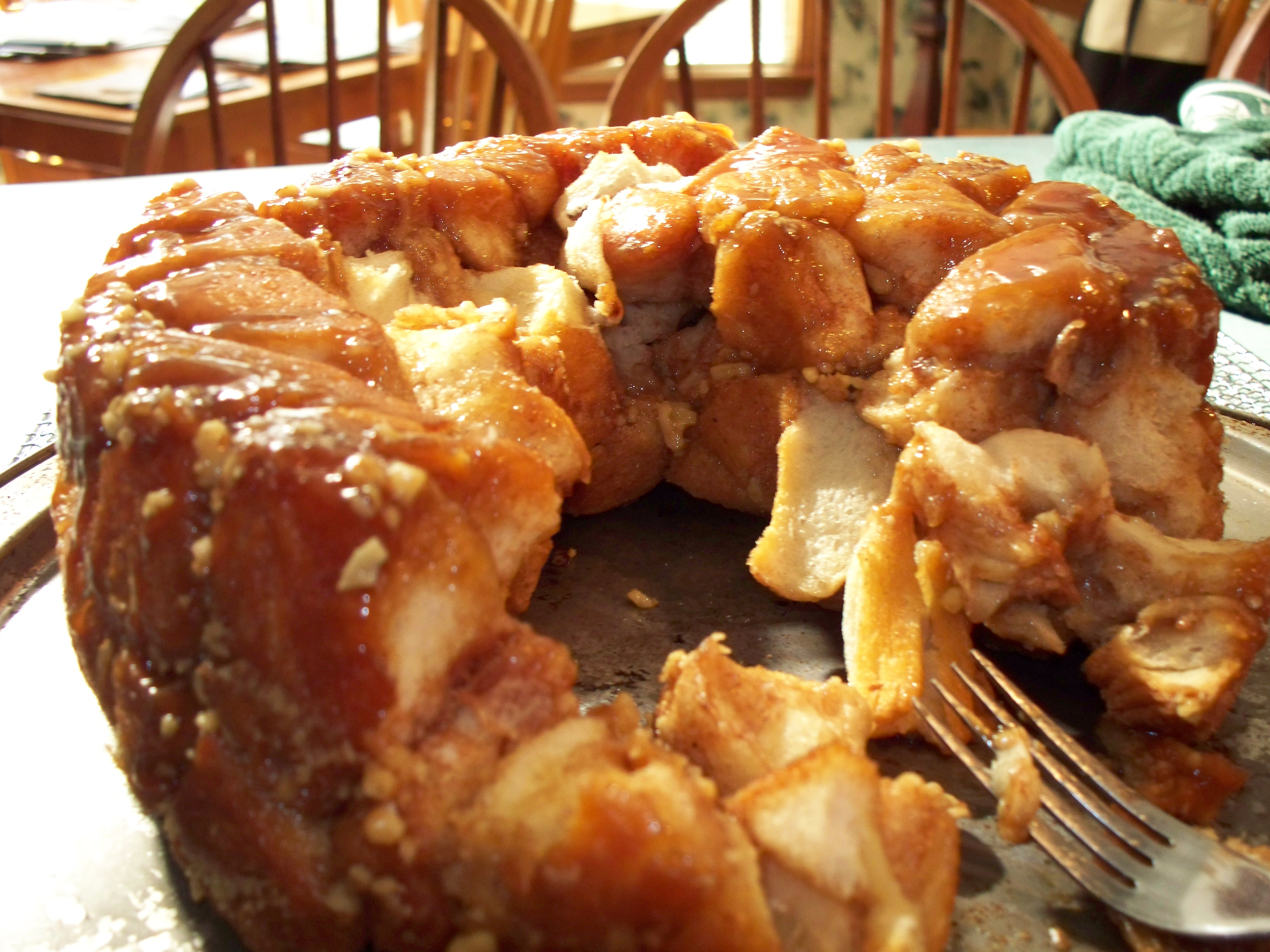
Monkey bread

The origin of the term "monkey bread" is unknown. Some food historians suggest that it comes from the bread being a finger food, and that those eating it pick apart the bread with their hands as a monkey might. Others suggest that it comes from the bread's resemblance to the monkey puzzle tree, Araucaria araucana.

== Origins ==
The "concept of rolling small pieces of bread dough in butter and baking them close together in a single container goes back in America only to the 19th century with the proliferation of baking pans." Versions of small balls of dough baked together with a filling dates back to Boston in the 1880s and the first versions were likely savory, only flavored by butter. What most people know as monkey bread today in the United States is actually the Hungarian dessert arany galuska ("golden dumpling"). Dating back to the 1880s in Hungarian literature, Hungarian immigrants brought this dish with them when they emigrated to America and began introducing it into the country's food landscape when Hungarian and Hungarian Jewish bakeries began selling it in the mid-twentieth century.

Recipes for the bread first appeared in American women's magazines and community cookbooks in the 1950s. For instance, the 1963 posthumous cookbook of actress ZaSu Pitts describes monkey bread.

In 1972, a cookbook published by Betty Crocker included a recipe for arany galuska, referred to as "Hungarian Coffee Cake". As it became more common in America, arany galuska came to be confused with monkey bread, in which the balls of dough are not dipped in cinnamon and sugar but only in butter. "Monkey bread" soon became the more common name for this Hungarian Jewish dessert.

During the 1980s, Nancy Reagan popularized serving monkey bread during Christmas by making it a staple of the Reagan White House Christmas. Mrs. Reagan acquired the recipe from her fellow actress ZaSu Pitts. According to food historian Gil Marks, she arranged for monkey bread to be served to President Reagan on the night before his testimony before Congress for the Iran-Contra hearings. As legend goes, Ronald Reagan said, "Mommy, I may go to prison, but I'll always remember this monkey bread."

== Preparation ==
To make the sweet cinnamon version, the bread is made with pieces of sweet yeast dough (often frozen), which are baked in a cake pan at high heat after first being individually covered in melted butter, cinnamon, and sugar. The balls should be bite-sized to differentiate the cake from tear-and-share bread rolls. Chopped pecans are also commonly added. It is traditionally served hot so that the baked segments can be easily torn away with the fingers and eaten by hand.

== See also ==
- List of buns
