= Arany galuska =

Traditional Hungarian dessert

Arany galushka
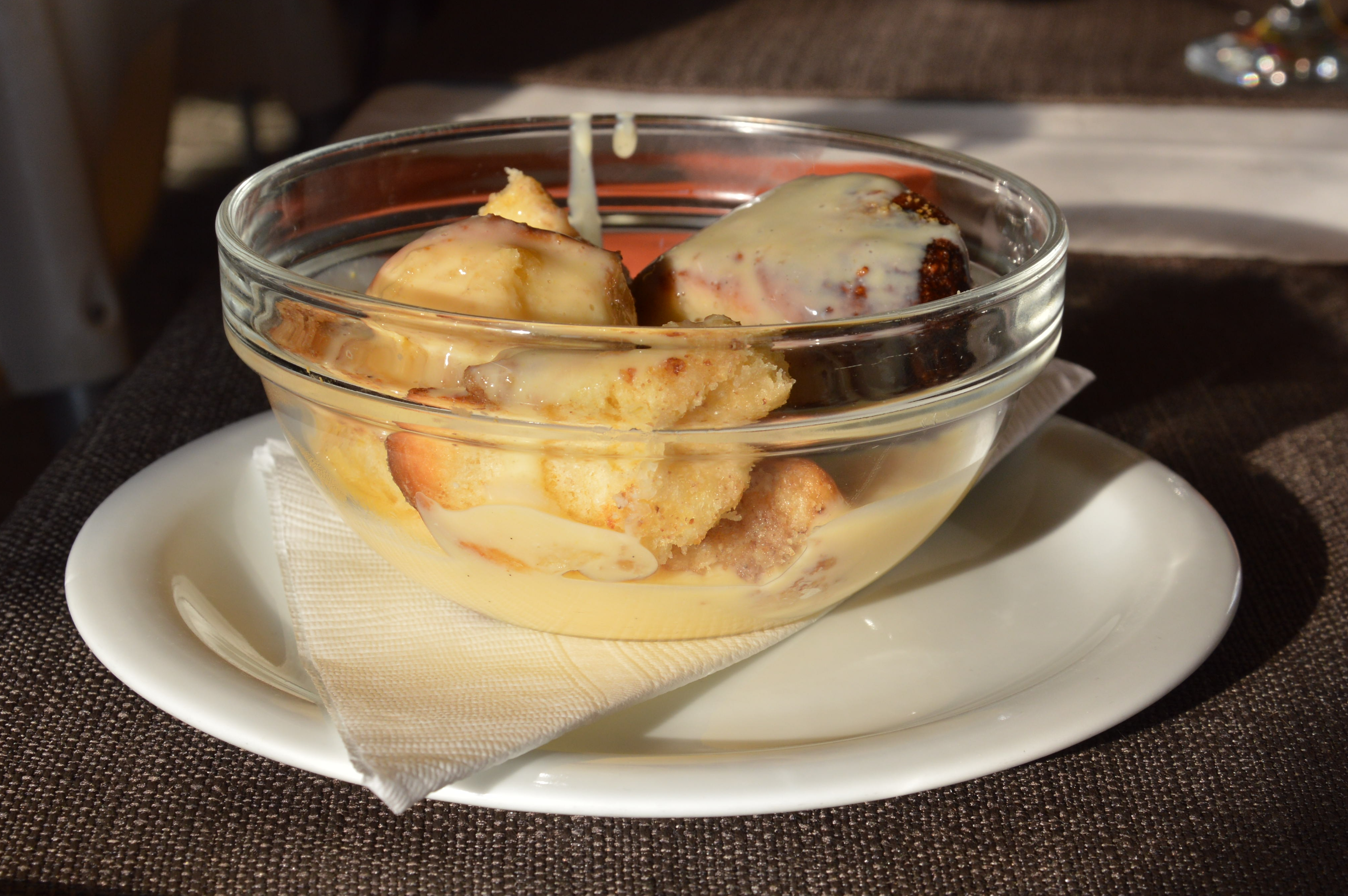
- Alternative names: Aranygaluska
- Course: Dessert
- Place of origin: Hungary
- Variations: Somloi galushka

Arany galushka (or aranygaluska; pronounced [ˈɒrɒɲɡɒluʃkɒ]) is a traditional Hungarian dessert consisting of balls of yeast dough (galuska). The balls are rolled in melted butter, and then rolled in a mixture of sugar and crushed nuts (traditionally walnuts), assembled into layers, before being baked till golden. Arany means 'gold' or 'golden'; galuska refers to the dumpling nature of the balls of dough. Arany galuska may be served with vanilla custard.

Nancy Reagan popularized this dish in the United States when she served it at the White House for Christmas.

== Related desserts ==
Somlói galuska bears similarity to an English trifle. Its galuska are made of sponge cake, which are layered with vanilla custard, chocolate sauce, raisins, and rum. It may be garnished with whipped cream.

== See also ==
- Buchteln
- Halušky
- Monkey bread
