= Esther 9 =

Chapter in the Book of Esther

- ← chapter 8 chapter 10 →
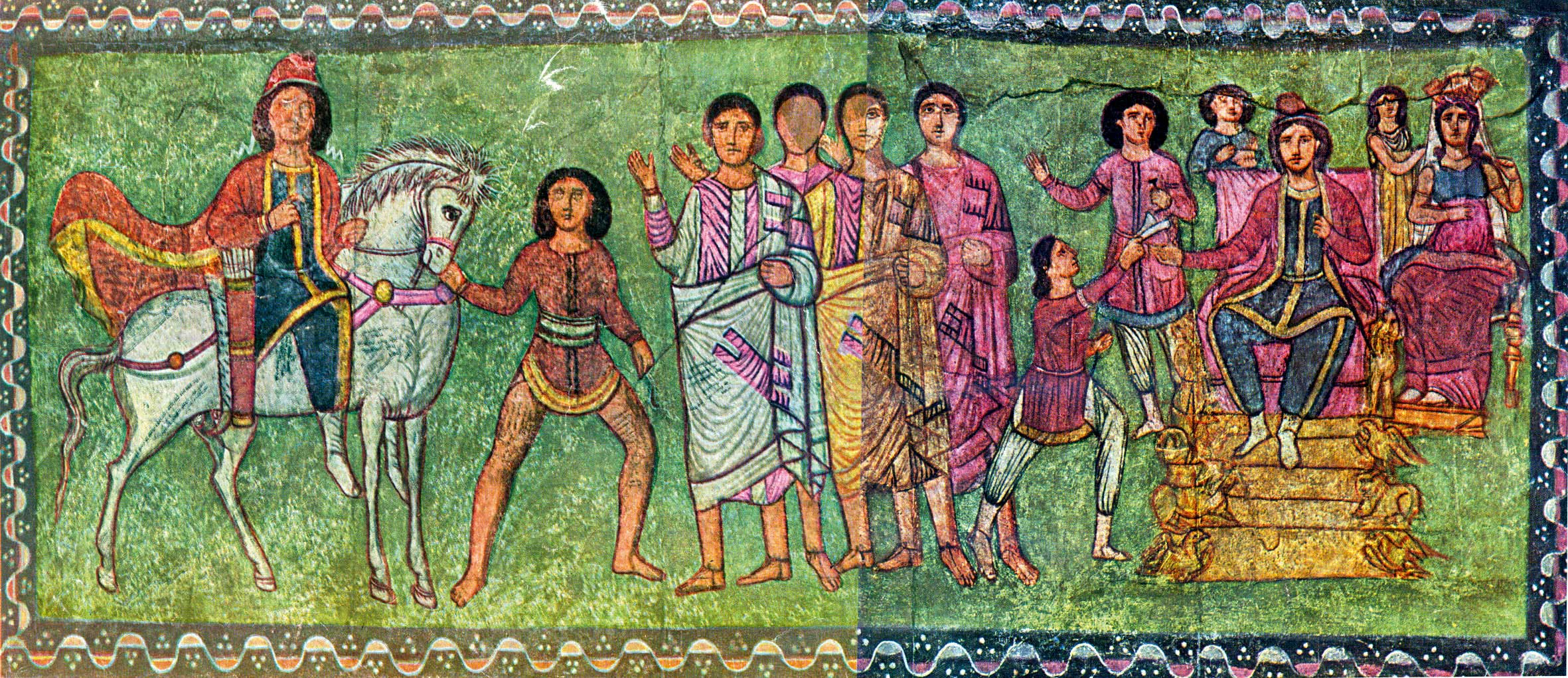
- Mordecai and Esther. Synagogue interior wood panel from Dura Europos, Syria. 245 CE.
- Book: Book of Esther
- Category: Ketuvim
- Christian Bible part: Old Testament
- Order in the Christian part: 17

Esther 9 is the ninth chapter of the Book of Esther in the Hebrew Bible or the Old Testament of the Christian Bible. The author of the book is unknown and modern scholars have established that the final stage of the Hebrew text would have been formed by the second century BCE. Chapters 9 to 10 contain the resolution of the stories in the book. This chapter records the events on the thirteenth and fourteenth of Adar and the institution of the Purim festival after the Jews overcome their enemies.

== Text ==
This chapter was originally written in the Hebrew language and since the 16th century is divided into 32 verses.

=== Textual witnesses ===
Some early manuscripts containing the text of this chapter in Hebrew are of the Masoretic Text, which includes Codex Leningradensis (1008). (Note: Since 1947 the current text of Aleppo Codex is missing the whole book of Esther.)

There is also a translation into Koine Greek known as the Septuagint, made in the last few centuries BCE. Extant ancient manuscripts of the Septuagint version include Codex Vaticanus (B; $\mathfrak{G}$^{B}; 4th century), Codex Sinaiticus (S; BHK: $\mathfrak{G}$^{S}; 4th century), and Codex Alexandrinus (A; $\mathfrak{G}$^{A}; 5th century).

== The events on the thirteenth and fourteenth of Adar (9:1–19) ==
The opening verse of this section explicitly describes the power reversal on the very day that the enemies of the Jews were to have vanquished them, but the opposite happened: 'the Jews would gain power over their foes' (9:1). On the thirteenth of Adar the Jews struck down 75,000 in the provinces (9:16) and 500 in the citadel of Susa (9:6) of those who hated them (9:5), also on the fourteenth of Adar, by a special additional edict (provided directly by the king at Esther's behest), the Jews killed 300 remaining enemies in the city of Susa, while at the same time, in accord with that additional royal edict, they hang the bodies of the ten sons of Haman on the gallows. A parallel with 1 Samuel 15:1–9 is that Saul spared Agag, and therefore lost his kingship as well as his life, so this time Esther determined not to make the same mistake with Haman and his sons. One important point is that they refrained from plundering (this is mentioned three times: 9:10, 15, 16), which indicates an echo in Esther 9 of 1 Samuel 15, resuming the parallel set up between Mordecai/Saul and Haman/Agag. After Saul defeated the Agagites (Amalek), he kept the best sheep and cattle as spoils in disobedience to God's command, thus earned divine disapproval and God regretting the choice of Saul as king. This time, unlike Saul, Mordecai and the Jews refrained from taking booty. However, the narrative overall focuses more on the pacific results of the bloodletting, gaining relief from hostile neighbors (9:1, 16) and the day(s) of rejoicing as celebration after the triumphant self-defense (9:17–19).

=== Verse 1 ===
Now in the twelfth month, that is, the month Adar, on the thirteenth day of the same, when the king's commandment and his decree drew near to be put in execution, in the day that the enemies of the Jews hoped to have power over them, (though it was turned to the contrary, that the Jews had rule over them that hated them;)

- "The king's commandment and his decree": in contrast to Esther 8:15 (only pointing to Haman), here the king's responsibility is not shielded.

=== Verse 17 ===
On the thirteenth day of the month Adar; and on the fourteenth day of the same rested they, and made it a day of feasting and gladness.'

The Jews in the Persian empire celebrate on the fourteenth, except those in Susa who celebrate on the fifteenth (verse 18).

=== Verse 18 ===
But the Jews that were at Shushan assembled together on the thirteenth day thereof, and on the fourteenth thereof; and on the fifteenth day of the same they rested, and made it a day of feasting and gladness.

The Jews in Susa have a different date of celebration than those outside the city because there were still fights in Susa until the fourteenth, so the celebration in that city was on the fifteenth.

=== Verse 19 ===
Therefore the Jews of the villages, that dwelt in the unwalled towns, made the fourteenth day of the month Adar a day of gladness and feasting, and a good day, and of sending portions one to another.

- "Sending portions one to another": points to the spirit of generosity as one significant nature of this celebration.

=== Links to modern history ===
The page on a scroll of Esther starting with the list of Haman's sons (some letters are written in unusual sizes in lines 2, 8 and 11)

On Purim 1942, ten Jews were hanged by Nazi in Zduńska Wola to "avenge" the hanging of Haman's ten sons. In a similar incident in 1943, the Nazis shot ten Jews from the Piotrków ghetto.

In an apparent connection made by Hitler between his Nazi regime and the role of Haman, Hitler stated in a speech made on January 30, 1944, that if the Nazis were defeated, the Jews could celebrate "a second Purim".

On October 16, 1946, Julius Streicher, one of ten Nazi members sentenced to hanging for the crimes against humanity after the Nuremberg trials, was heard to sarcastically remark "Purimfest 1946" as he ascended the scaffold. According to Rabbi Mordechai Neugroschel, there is a code in the Book of Esther which lies in the names of Haman's 10 sons (Esther 9:7–9). Three of the Hebrew letters—a tav, a shin and a zayin—are written smaller than the rest, while a vav is written larger. The outsized vav—which represents the number six—corresponds to the sixth millennium of the world since creation, which, according to Jewish tradition, is the period between 1240 and 2240 CE. As for the tav, shin and zayin, their numerical values add up to 707. Put together, these letters refer to the Jewish year 5707, which corresponds to the secular 1946–1947. In his research, Neugroschel noticed that ten Nazi defendants in the Nuremberg Trials were executed by hanging on October 16, 1946, which was also that year's date of Hoshana Rabbah (21st of Tishrei; the final judgement day of Judaism). Additionally, Hermann Göring, the eleventh Nazi official sentenced to death, committed suicide, parallel to Haman's daughter in Tractate Megillah.

== The institution of the Festival of Purim (9:20–32) ==
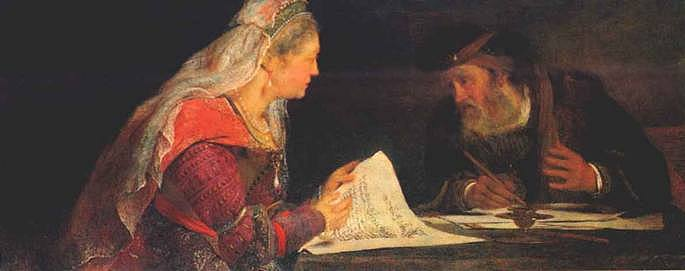
Esther and Mordechai writing the second letter of Purim. Aert de Gelder (1685).

This section, perhaps an addition to the coherent narrative of 1:1 through 9:19, recapitulates the core reversals: relief from persecution, turning 'sorrow into gladness' and 'mourning into a holiday' (9:22). For commemoration by future generations, a two-day holiday is newly instituted, reflecting the original feasting on the fourteenth of Adar in the provinces and a day later in Susa, with Haman's casting of lots (purim) providing an etymology for the festival. Mordecai and Esther as officeholders in the Persian empire harnessing 'the resources of the chancellery and the imperial postal system' dispatched a set of letters to Jews in 'all the provinces' (verse 20; cf. verse 30) and thus using the same language as in the accounts of earlier royal edicts (1:22; 3:12–13; 8:9). Together they wrote these official letters enjoining Jews to celebrate Purim (verses 29, 31), as well as a second letter (verse 29). Esther's royal authority in establishing Purim is reaffirmed at the end of this section, where she is named as the one establishing the customs of the holiday (verse 32).

=== Verse 29 ===
Then Esther the queen, the daughter of Abihail, and Mordecai the Jew, wrote with all authority, to confirm this second letter of Purim.

The name of the festival calls the attention to "the day of reversal", when the day of determined defeat became a day of salvation.

== See also ==
- Xerxes I
- Susa
- Related Bible parts: Esther 1, 2, 3

== Sources ==
- Bechtel, Carol (1983). Esther. Westminster John Knox Press. ISBN 978-0664237455.
- Clines, David J. A. (1988). "Esther". In Mays, James Luther; Blenkinsopp, Joseph (eds.). Harper's Bible Commentary (illustrated ed.). Harper & Row. pp. 387–394. ISBN 978-0060655419.
- Crawford, Sidnie White (2003). "Esther". In Dunn, James D. G.; Rogerson, John William (eds.). Eerdmans Commentary on the Bible (illustrated ed.). Wm. B. Eerdmans Publishing. pp. 329–336. ISBN 978-0802837110.
- Halley, Henry H. (1965). Halley's Bible Handbook: an abbreviated Bible commentary (24th (revised) ed.). Zondervan Publishing House. ISBN 0-310-25720-4.
- Meyers, Carol (2007). "16. Esther". In Barton, John; Muddiman, John (eds.). The Oxford Bible Commentary (first (paperback) ed.). Oxford University Press. pp. 324–330. ISBN 978-0199277186.
- Würthwein, Ernst (1995). The Text of the Old Testament. Translated by Rhodes, Erroll F. Grand Rapids, MI: Wm. B. Eerdmans. ISBN 0-8028-0788-7.
