= Esther 6 =

Chapter in the Book of Esther

- ← chapter 5 chapter 7 →
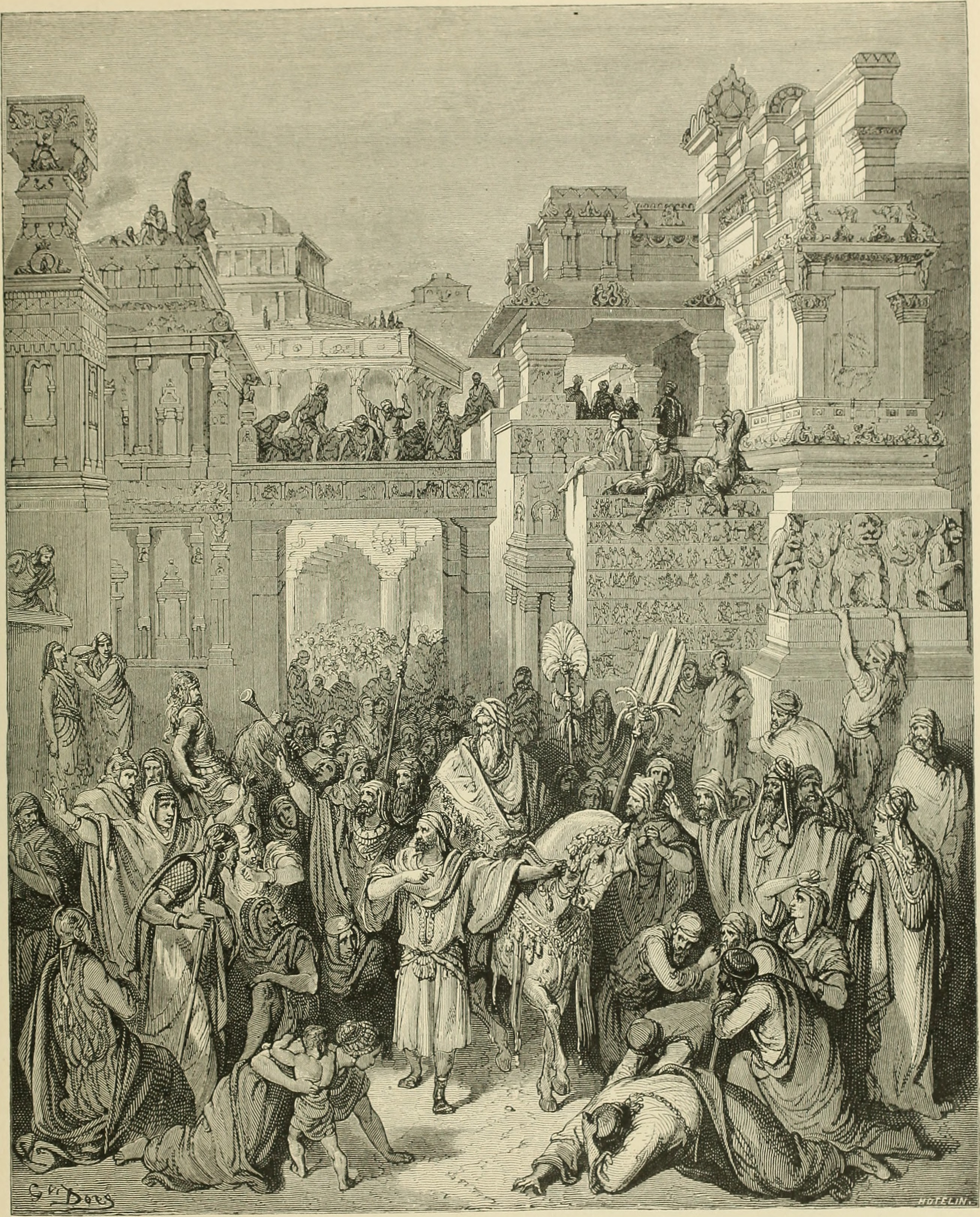
- Haman brings Mordecai, riding upon the king's horse, thorugh the street of the city. "The Bible panorama/The Holy Scriptures in picture and story" (1891).
- Book: Book of Esther
- Category: Ketuvim
- Christian Bible part: Old Testament
- Order in the Christian part: 17

Esther 6 is the sixth chapter of the Book of Esther in the Hebrew Bible or the Old Testament of the Christian Bible, The author of the book is unknown and modern scholars have established that the final stage of the Hebrew text would have been formed by the second century BCE. Chapters 3 to 8 contain the nine scenes that form the complication in the book. This chapter relates how a sleepless Ahasuerus had his court annals read aloud and discovered that he had failed to reward Mordecai for passing on the information about the assassination plot. The episode leads to 'a marvellously ironic scene' (6:4–11), as the narrative 'moves inexorably to its ultimate reversal', starting with Haman leading a king's horse carrying Mordecai, clothed in royal garb through the streets of Susa, and proclaiming the king's favor for Mordecai. Haman went home exhibiting mourning behavior and his wife predicted that Haman's intent to destroy Mordecai would end up with the opposite result.

== Text ==
This chapter was originally written in the Hebrew language and since the 16th century is divided into 14 verses.

=== Textual witnesses ===
Some early manuscripts containing the text of this chapter in Hebrew are of the Masoretic Text, which includes Codex Leningradensis (1008). (Note: Since 1947 the current text of Aleppo Codex is missing the whole book of Esther.)

There is also a translation into Koine Greek known as the Septuagint, made in the last few centuries BCE. Extant ancient manuscripts of the Septuagint version include Codex Vaticanus (B; $\mathfrak{G}$^{B}; 4th century), Codex Sinaiticus (S; BHK: $\mathfrak{G}$^{S}; 4th century), and Codex Alexandrinus (A; $\mathfrak{G}$^{A}; 5th century).

== The king discovers the failure to reward Mordecai (6:1–3) ==
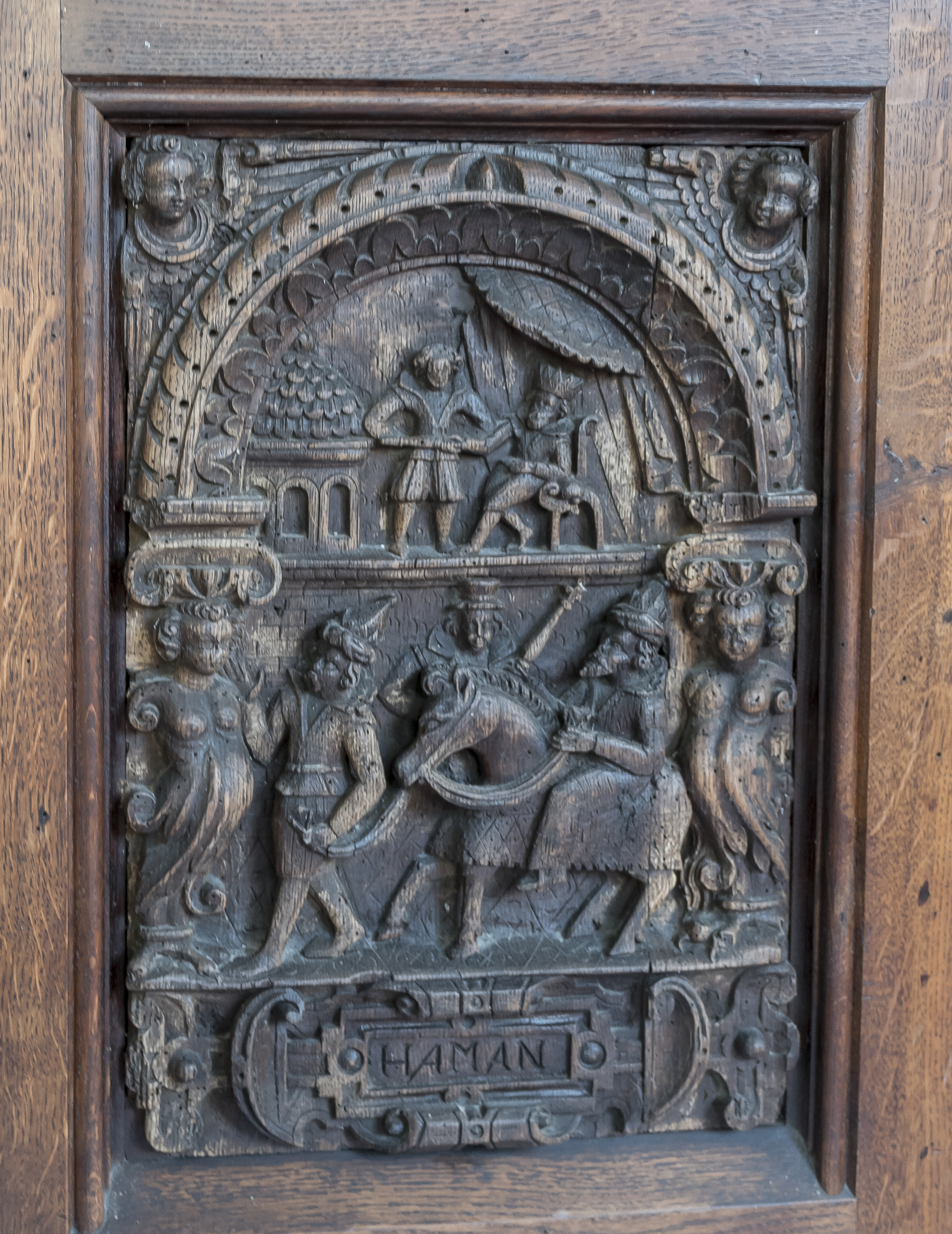
Elaborately carved relief figures in ornamental arcading tell the story in the Book of Esther; top scene: Haman advised the king how to deal with a man he wishes to honor; bottom scene: Haman, with drooping countenance, leading the king's horse, on which rides his enemy Mordecai in the royal apparel. St Martin's church pulpit. Arthur Mee 1938.

This section records how the king was by chance sleepless that night (cf. Daniel 6:18), so he asked the Royal Chronicles to be read aloud (by chance containing Mordecai's benefaction to the king) and found out that, by chance, Mordecai had not been rewarded.

=== Verse 1 ===
On that night could not the king sleep, and he commanded to bring the book of records of the chronicles; and they were read before the king.

- "Could not the king sleep" (KJV): Hebrew: "the king's sleep fled away".
- "The book of records of the chronicles": Hebrew: "the book of the remembrances of the accounts of the days"; NAB "the chronicle of notable events"; NET: "the book containing the historical records".

=== Verse 2 ===
And it was found written, that Mordecai had told of Bigthana and Teresh, two of the king's chamberlains, the keepers of the door, who sought to lay hand on the king Ahasuerus.

- "Bigthana": an alternate spelling of "Bigthan" (Esther 2:21).

=== Verse 3 ===
And the king said, What honour and dignity hath been done to Mordecai for this? Then said the king's servants that ministered unto him, There is nothing done for him.

- "Honour and dignity": from Hebrew: "Honor and greatness”, a hendiadys, which is a figure of speech in which a single idea is expressed through two words or phrases.

== Haman advises the king how to reward the man whom the king wishes to honor (6:4–10) ==
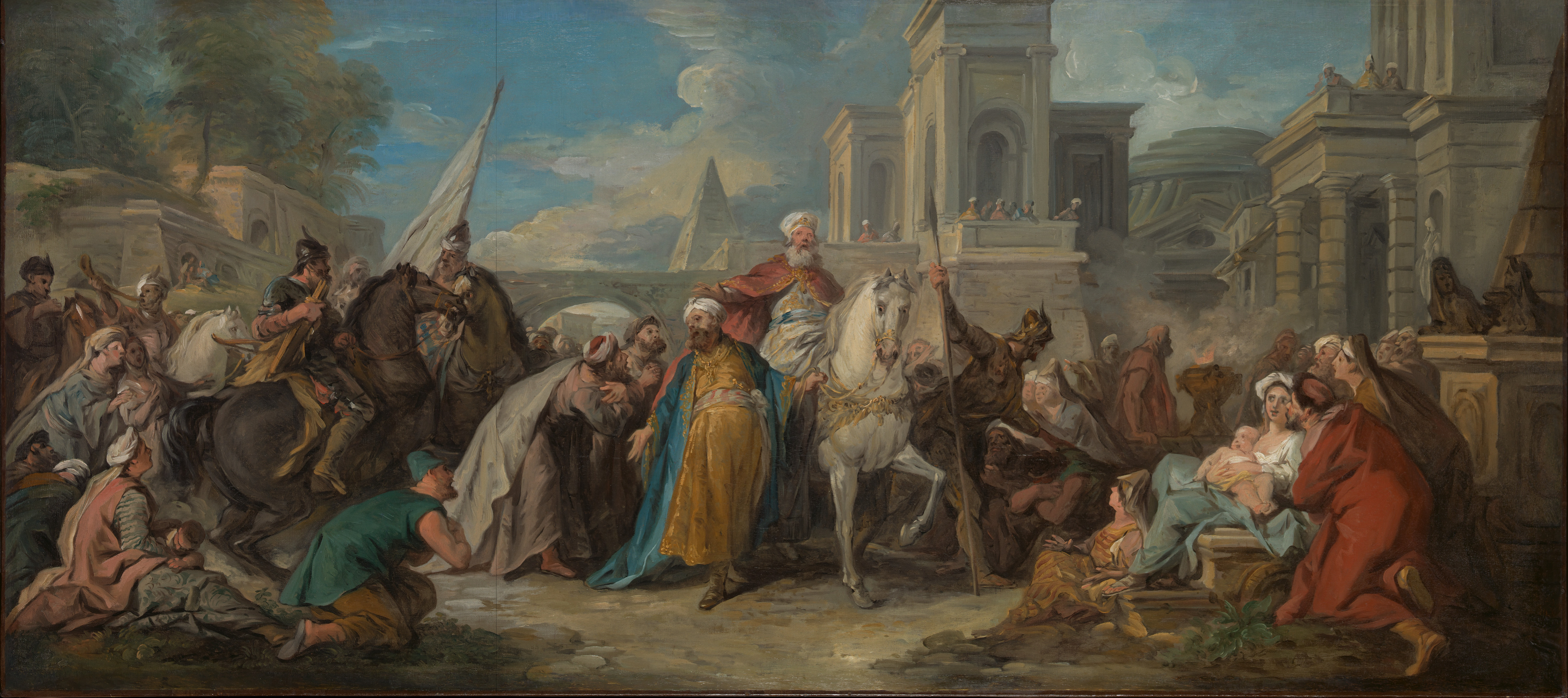
Oil sketch for a tapestry design, by Jean-François de Troy (January 1, 1736).

By chance, Haman was first to afoot in the palace early in the morning to give advice. Any courtier of the king could have given advice, but ironically it is Haman who gave it and also who had to perform the bestowing of the honor he actually desired for himself to Mordecai.

=== Verse 6 ===
So Haman came in, and the king asked him, "What shall be done for the man whom the king delights to honor?"
Now Haman thought in his heart, "Whom would the king delight to honor more than me?"

The king unintentionally destroys Haman by hiding the name of the person he wants to honor, in an irony to the fact that Haman intentionally hid from the king the name of the people he wants to destroy (Esther 3:8).

== Haman honors Mordecai according to his own advice to the king (6:11) ==
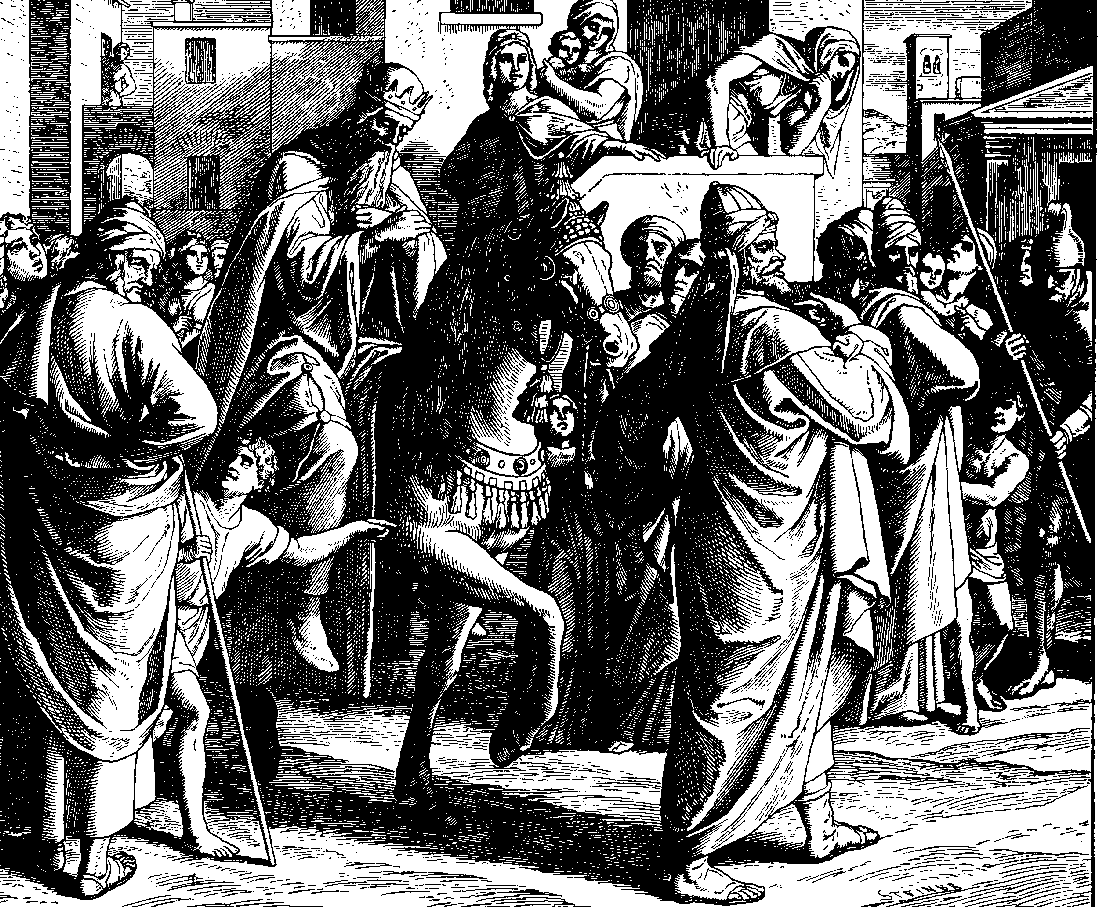
Mordecai is honored; 1860 woodcut by Julius Schnorr von Karolsfeld

Haman concocted an unusually high honor for the "man whom the king delights to honor", but the king without reflection immediately accepted the advice, only to command Haman to perform it on "Mordecai the Jew", thus unintentionally heaping additional humiliation to Haman. The mention of "the Jew" indicates that the king does not relate the Jewish people to the edict of destruction he approved just a few days ago.

=== Verse 11 ===
Then took Haman the apparel and the horse, and arrayed Mordecai, and brought him on horseback through the street of the city, and proclaimed before him, Thus shall it be done unto the man whom the king delighteth to honour.

Haman's desire to wear the king's clothes and ride on the king horse shows the psychology of an outsider who longed, but never really believed he was able, to be an insider of Persian royalty. This is also shown by how thrilled Haman was to be invited to a private banquet with the king and queen (Esther 5:9, 12).

== Haman's friends and wife predict his downfall (6:12–14) ==
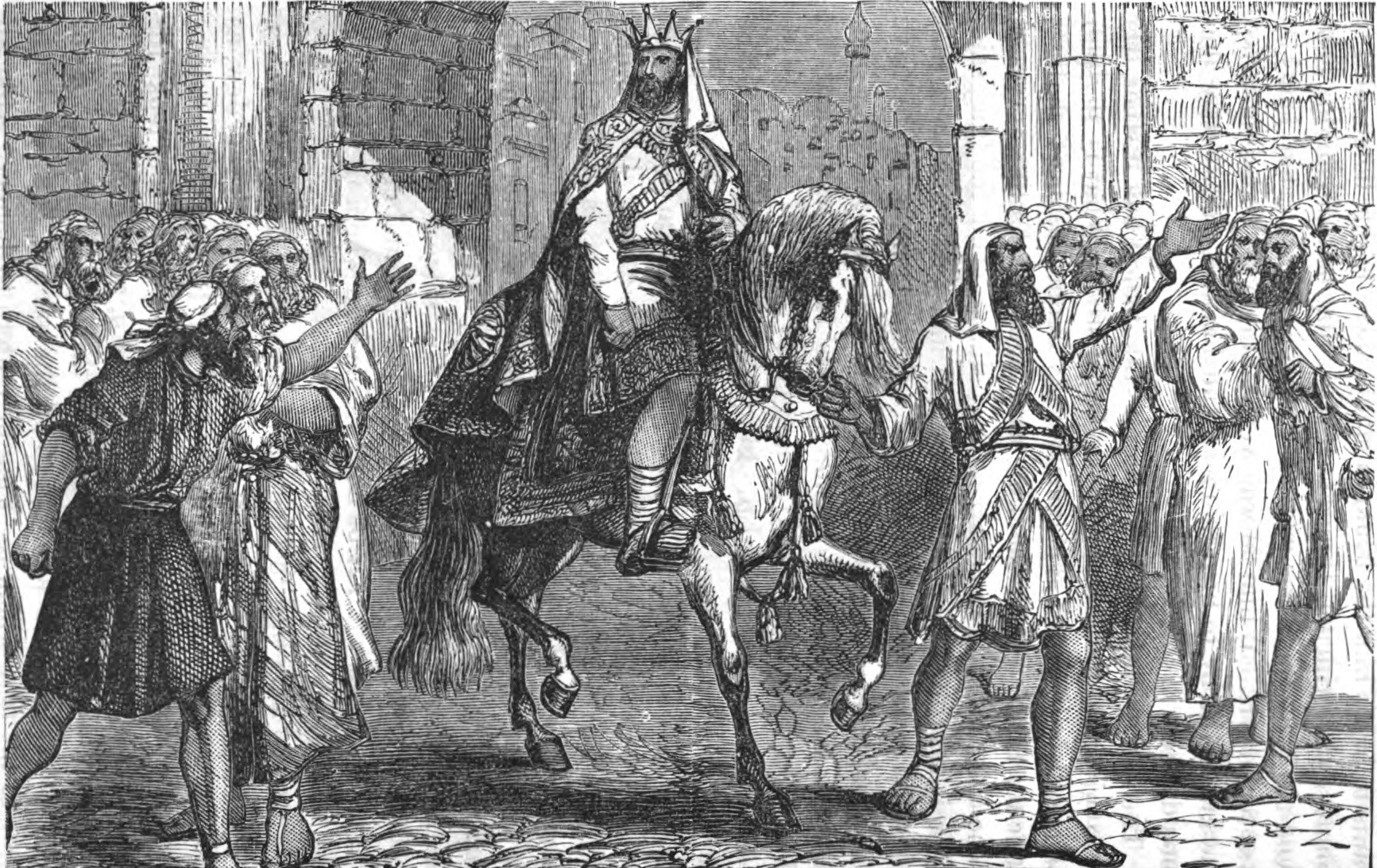
Haman leads Mordecai through the city. In: "The story of the Bible from Genesis to Revelation" (1873)

This section articulates the significant turning point of the story with the prediction concerning the downfall of Haman, the hereditary enemy of the Jews, and the deliverance of the Jews.

=== Verse 13 ===
And Haman told Zeresh his wife and all his friends every thing that had befallen him. Then said his wise men and Zeresh his wife unto him, If Mordecai be of the seed of the Jews, before whom thou hast begun to fall, thou shalt not prevail against him, but shalt surely fall before him.

Zeresh's response is based on the fact that Mordecai is Jewish, conveying a powerful notion underlying the whole book—that the Jews will ultimately survive.

=== Verse 14 ===
And while they were yet talking with him, came the king's chamberlains, and hasted to bring Haman unto the banquet that Esther had prepared.

- "Came the king's chamberlains": a well-known Eastern custom of fetching guests (Luke 14:17).

== See also ==
- Eunuch
- Xerxes I
- Susa
- Related Bible parts: Esther 3

== Sources ==
- Clines, David J. A. (1988). "Esther". In Mays, James Luther; Blenkinsopp, Joseph (eds.). Harper's Bible Commentary (illustrated ed.). Harper & Row. pp. 387–394. ISBN 978-0060655419.
- Crawford, Sidnie White (2003). "Esther". In Dunn, James D. G.; Rogerson, John William (eds.). Eerdmans Commentary on the Bible (illustrated ed.). Wm. B. Eerdmans Publishing. pp. 329–336. ISBN 978-0802837110.
- Halley, Henry H. (1965). Halley's Bible Handbook: an abbreviated Bible commentary (24th (revised) ed.). Zondervan Publishing House. ISBN 0-310-25720-4.
- Larson, Knute; Dahlen, Kathy; Anders, Max E. (2005). Anders, Max E. (ed.). Holman Old Testament Commentary - Ezra, Nehemiah, Esther. Holman Old Testament commentary. Vol. 9 (illustrated ed.). B&H Publishing Group. ISBN 978-0805494693.
- Meyers, Carol (2007). "16. Esther". In Barton, John; Muddiman, John (eds.). The Oxford Bible Commentary (first (paperback) ed.). Oxford University Press. pp. 324–330. ISBN 978-0199277186.
- Moore, Carey A. (Sep–Dec 1975). "Archaeology and the Book of Esther". The Biblical Archaeologist. 38 (3/4): 62–79. doi:10.2307/3209587. JSTOR 3209587. S2CID 166110735.
- Smith, Gary (2018). Ezra, Nehemiah, Esther. Cornerstone Biblical Commentary. Vol. 5. Tyndale House. ISBN 978-1414399126.
- Turner, L. A. (2013). Desperately Seeking YHWH: Finding God in Esther's "Acrostics". Interested Readers. Essays on the Hebrew Bible in Honor of David J. A. Clines, 183–193.
- Würthwein, Ernst (1995). The Text of the Old Testament. Translated by Rhodes, Erroll F. Grand Rapids, MI: Wm. B. Eerdmans. ISBN 0-8028-0788-7.
