= Esther 4 =

Chapter in the Book of Esther

- ← chapter 3 chapter 5 →
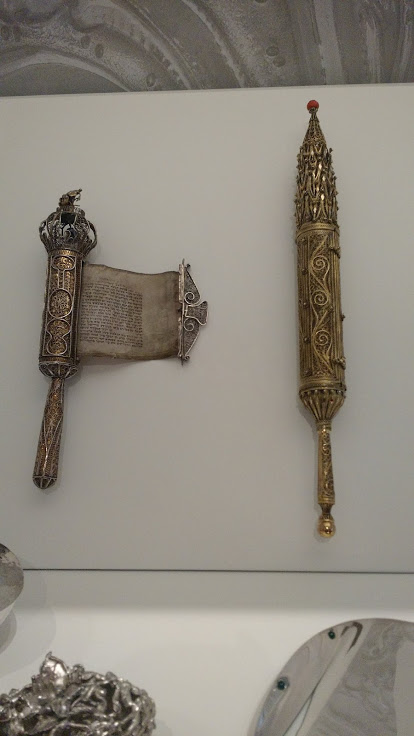
- The Hebrew text of the Book of Esther in a scroll from 19th century, ink on vellum, with a case of gilded silver.
- Book: Book of Esther
- Category: Ketuvim
- Christian Bible part: Old Testament
- Order in the Christian part: 17

Esther 4 is the fourth chapter of the Book of Esther in the Hebrew Bible or the Old Testament of the Christian Bible. The author of the book is unknown and modern scholars have established that the final stage of the Hebrew text would have been formed by the second century BCE. Chapters 3 to 8 contain the nine scenes that form the complication in the book. This chapter describes the reaction of the Jews to Haman's evil decree, focusing on Mordecai's action of mourning and fasting, which eventually forced Esther to take action on her own by risking her life to appear uninvited before King Ahasuerus.

== Text ==
This chapter was originally written in the Hebrew language and since the 16th century is divided into 17 verses.

=== Textual witnesses ===
Some early manuscripts containing the text of this chapter in Hebrew are of the Masoretic Text, which includes Codex Leningradensis (1008). (Note: Since 1947 the current text of Aleppo Codex is missing the whole book of Esther.)

There is also a translation into Koine Greek known as the Septuagint, made in the last few centuries BCE. Extant ancient manuscripts of the Septuagint version include Codex Vaticanus (B; $\mathfrak{G}$^{B}; 4th century), Codex Sinaiticus (S; BHK: $\mathfrak{G}$^{S}; 4th century), and Codex Alexandrinus (A; $\mathfrak{G}$^{A}; 5th century).

== Mordecai hears the threat of genocide against the Jews (4:1–3) ==
When they heard the threat of genocide, Mordecai and the Jews throughout the Persian empire showed religious response publicly, although without referring to God.

=== Verse 1 ===
When Mordecai perceived all that was done, Mordecai rent his clothes, and put on sackcloth with ashes, and went out into the midst of the city, and cried with a loud and a bitter cry;

- "Loud": Hebrew: "great".

=== Verse 3 ===
And in every province, wherever the king's command and his decree reached, there was great mourning among the Jews, with fasting and weeping and lamenting, and many of them lay in sackcloth and ashes.

- "Reached" (ESV, NAB, NLT): from Hebrew: מַגִּ֔יעַ, ma-gî-a‘, "arrived"; KJV, MEV, NASB, NIV: "came"; TEV: "wherever the king's proclamation was made known."

== Mordecai impresses on Esther the need for action (4:4–17) ==
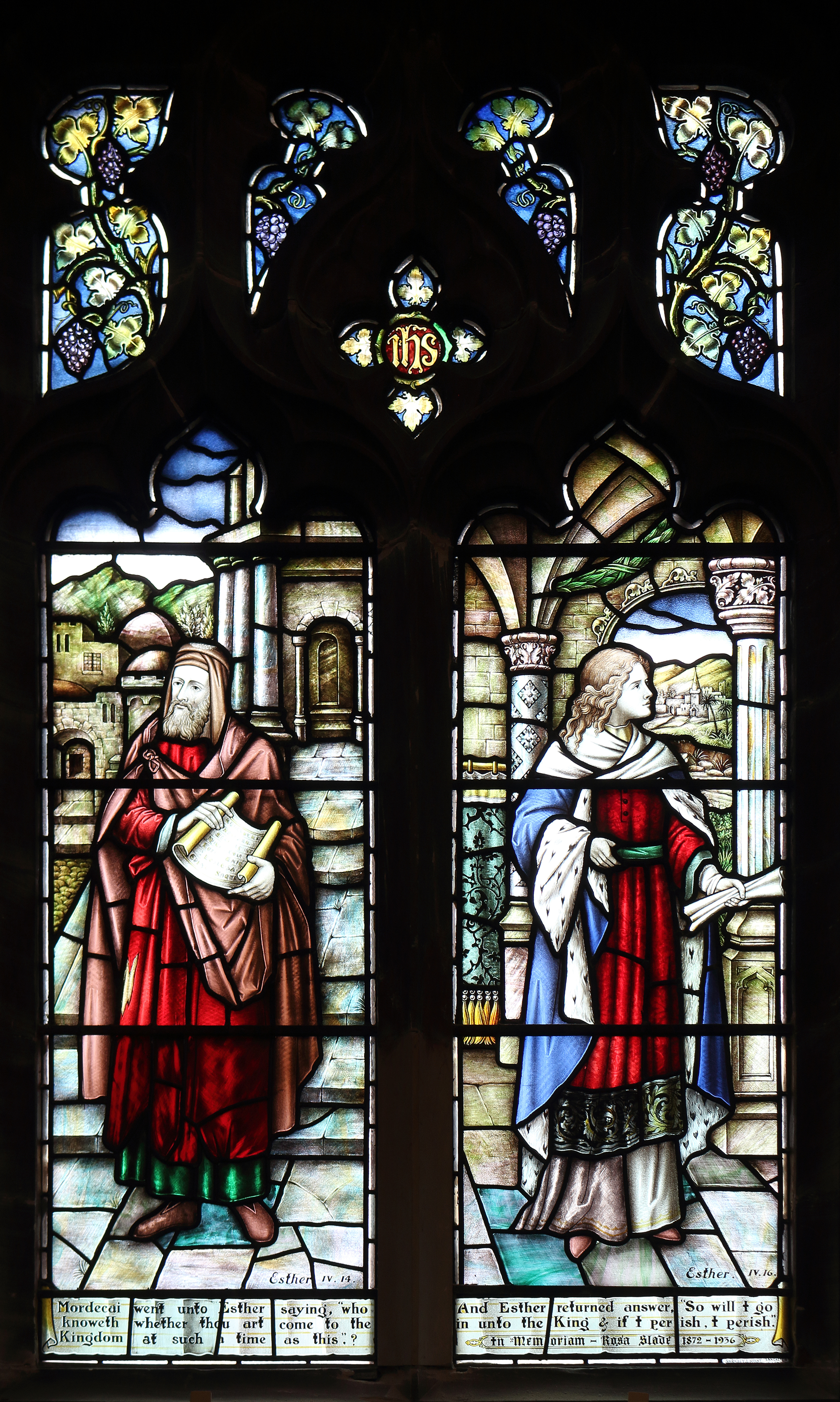
Memorial window in St Nicholas, Wallasey, to Rosa Slade (1872-1936), showing Esther and Mordecai from Esther 4:14, 16.

This section records the communication between Mordecai and Esther, which passed through three stages:

1. Esther's gift of clothes to Mordecai was rejected. No words were spoken. (verse 4)
2. Oral and written messages were sent from Mordecai to Esther, but the words are not reported. (verses 5–9)
3. Exchange of words between Esther and Mordecai are narrated. (verses 10–17)

These stages represent a movement in Esther from ignorance to understanding to decision: Esther eventually took charge and Mordecai went to do 'everything that Esther had commanded him'.

=== Verse 14 ===
[Mordecai said:] "For if you remain completely silent at this time, relief and deliverance will arise for the Jews from another place, but you and your father’s house will perish. Yet who knows whether you have come to the kingdom for such a time as this?"

Mordecai's statement assumes the existence of a providential order, although God is not mentioned by name at all. Some ancient references (Josephus; Targum Esther I, II) understand the Hebrew word mā-qōm ("place") as a circumlocution for God.

=== Verse 16 ===
[Esther said:] "Go, gather all the Jews who are present in Shushan, and fast for me; neither eat nor drink for three days, night or day. My maids and I will fast likewise. And so I will go to the king, which is against the law; and if I perish, I perish!"

- "Shushan": or "Susa".
- "And if I perish, I perish": This statement shows that Esther accepts the risk, acknowledging its necessity. The form of expression reflects Jacob's words in Genesis 43:14.

== See also ==
- Eunuch
- Xerxes I
- Susa
- Related Bible parts: Daniel 3

== Sources ==
- Clines, David J. A. (1988). "Esther". In Mays, James Luther; Blenkinsopp, Joseph (eds.). Harper's Bible Commentary (illustrated ed.). Harper & Row. pp. 387–394. ISBN 978-0060655419.
- Crawford, Sidnie White (2003). "Esther". In Dunn, James D. G.; Rogerson, John William (eds.). Eerdmans Commentary on the Bible (illustrated ed.). Wm. B. Eerdmans Publishing. pp. 329–336. ISBN 978-0802837110.
- Halley, Henry H. (1965). Halley's Bible Handbook: an abbreviated Bible commentary (24th (revised) ed.). Zondervan Publishing House. ISBN 0-310-25720-4.
- Larson, Knute; Dahlen, Kathy; Anders, Max E. (2005). Anders, Max E. (ed.). Holman Old Testament Commentary - Ezra, Nehemiah, Esther. Holman Old Testament commentary. Vol. 9 (illustrated ed.). B&H Publishing Group. ISBN 978-0805494693.
- Meyers, Carol (2007). "16. Esther". In Barton, John; Muddiman, John (eds.). The Oxford Bible Commentary (first (paperback) ed.). Oxford University Press. pp. 324–330. ISBN 978-0199277186.
- Moore, Carey A. (Sep–Dec 1975). "Archaeology and the Book of Esther". The Biblical Archaeologist. 38 (3/4): 62–79. doi:10.2307/3209587. JSTOR 3209587. S2CID 166110735.
- Smith, Gary (2018). Ezra, Nehemiah, Esther. Cornerstone Biblical Commentary. Vol. 5. Tyndale House. ISBN 978-1414399126.
- Turner, L. A. (2013). Desperately Seeking YHWH: Finding God in Esther's "Acrostics". Interested Readers. Essays on the Hebrew Bible in Honor of David J. A. Clines, 183–193.
- Würthwein, Ernst (1995). The Text of the Old Testament. Translated by Rhodes, Erroll F. Grand Rapids, MI: Wm. B. Eerdmans. ISBN 0-8028-0788-7.
