= Esther 7 =

Chapter in the Book of Esther

- ← chapter 6 chapter 8 →
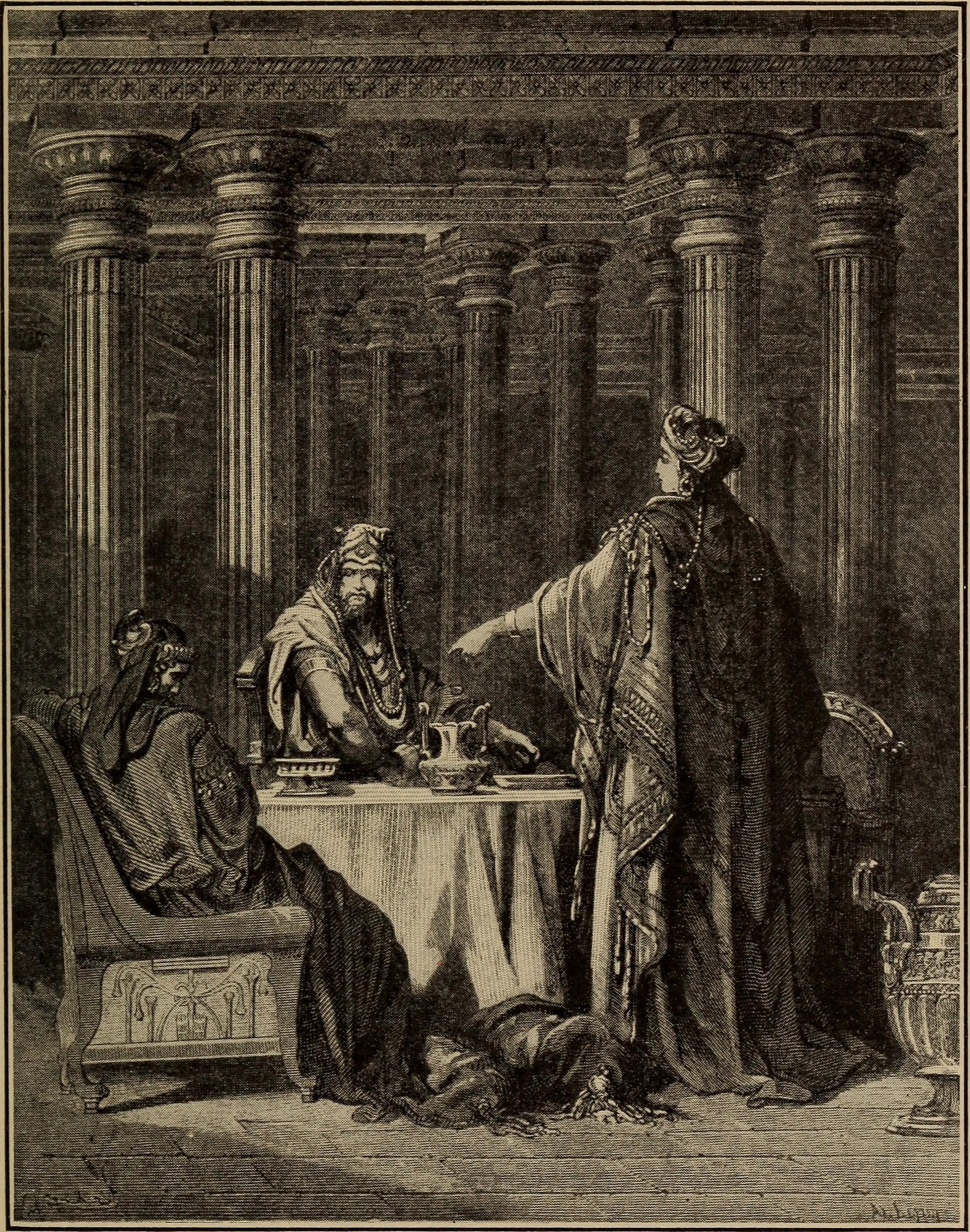
- "Esther accusing Haman", by Gustav Dore. in Heermans, Josephine Woodbury (1903) Stories from the Hebrew.
- Book: Book of Esther
- Category: Ketuvim
- Christian Bible part: Old Testament
- Order in the Christian part: 17

Esther 7 is the seventh chapter of the Book of Esther in the Hebrew Bible or the Old Testament of the Christian Bible, The author of the book is unknown and modern scholars have established that the final stage of the Hebrew text would have been formed by the second century BCE. Chapters 3 to 8 contain the nine scenes that form the complication in the book. This chapter records the second banquet of Esther. The king Ahasuerus was then determined to grant her any request, so Esther spoke out about the death threat on her people and identifies Haman as the perpetrator of the projected genocide. The king went out to his garden in a rage, but shortly came back to see Haman seemingly threatening Esther on her recliner couch. This caused the king to command the hanging of Haman on the very gallows Haman intended for Mordecai.

== Text ==
This chapter was originally written in the Hebrew language and since the 16th century is divided into 10 verses.

=== Textual witnesses ===
Some early manuscripts containing the text of this chapter in Hebrew are of the Masoretic Text, which includes Codex Leningradensis (1008). (Note: Since 1947 the current text of Aleppo Codex is missing the whole book of Esther.)

There is also a translation into Koine Greek known as the Septuagint, made in the last few centuries BCE. Extant ancient manuscripts of the Septuagint version include Codex Vaticanus (B; $\mathfrak{G}$^{B}; 4th century), Codex Sinaiticus (S; BHK: $\mathfrak{G}$^{S}; 4th century), and Codex Alexandrinus (A; $\mathfrak{G}$^{A}; 5th century).

== Esther reveals Haman's plot (7:1–6) ==
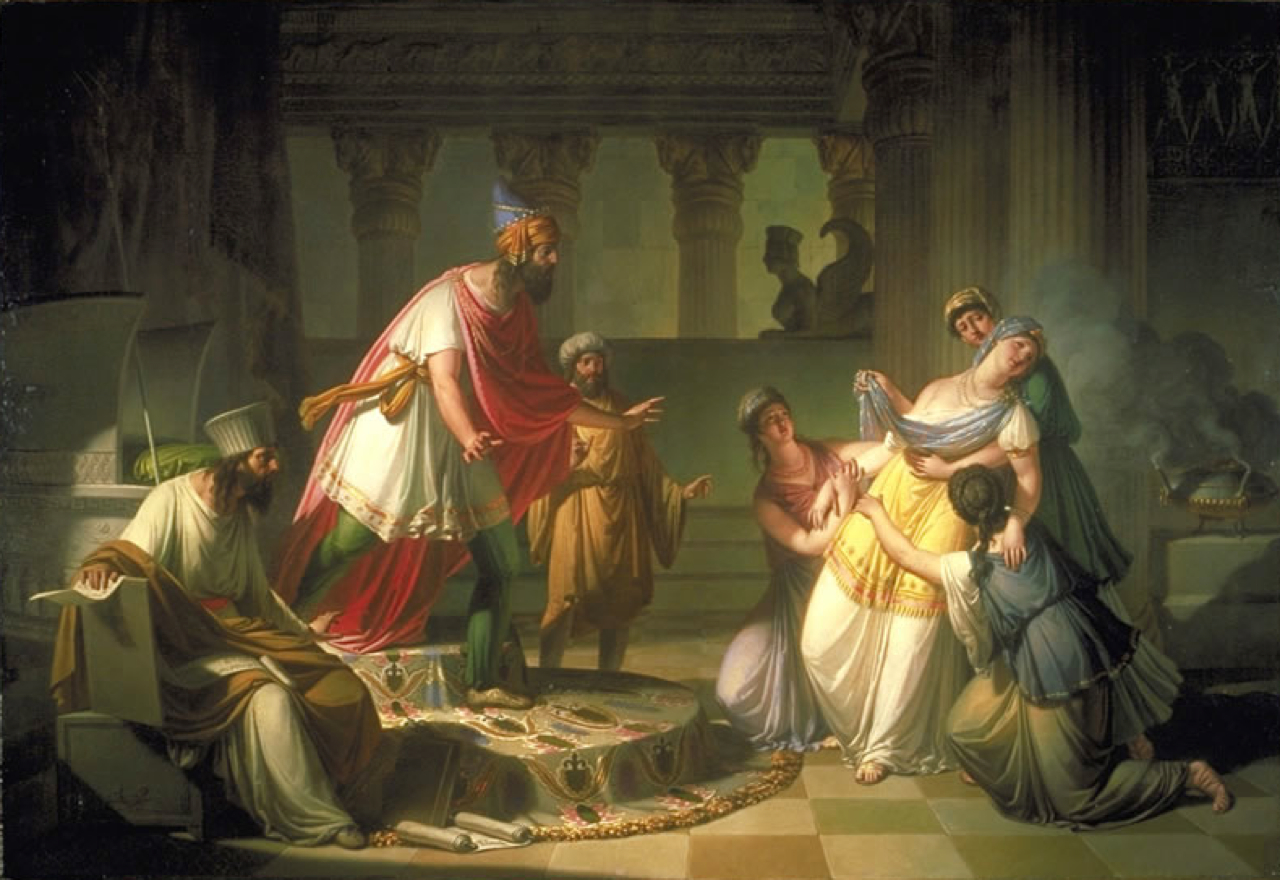
Esther before Ahasuerus by Franc Kavčič, 1815

This section records how Esther finally speaks out about the projected genocide to her people (for the first time identifies herself as a member of these people) and then 'requests that the lives of all this group be spared'. The king was then determined to grant her any request, so Esther spoke out about the death threat on her people and identifies Haman as the perpetrator of the projected genocide. The king is perplexed because he might have thought he was authorizing a servitude plan instead of annihilation, which gave a chance for Esther to identify Haman as the perpetrator.

=== Verse 3 ===
Then Queen Esther answered and said, “If I have found favor in your sight, O king, and if it pleases the king, let my life be given me at my petition, and my people at my request.

For the first time Esther addressed the king in the second person, 'if I have won your favour', rather than the custom of using the third person, 'if I have won the king's favour', as in 5:8, indicating that she is now "ready to be direct in her petitions as well as in her identity'.

=== Verse 5 ===
So King Ahasuerus answered and said to Queen Esther, "Who is he, and where is he, who would dare presume in his heart to do such a thing?"

- "Who is he, and where is he": from Hebrew: מי הוא זה ואי זה הוא, mî hū zeh wə-’ê zeh hū. This phrase delivers the consonants of אהיה ("I Am"), central to God's self-revelation in Exodus 3:14. Just as God's divine name, YHWH, is deliberately hidden by means of the literary style of acrostics in four verses within the Book of Esther (verses 1:20; 5:4; 5:13 and 7:7), this one is formed by the final letters, written in 'majuscule' (bigger than the rest) in some manuscripts with Masoretic authority. There is a partial overlap of contiguous final characters that produces this divine title when read right to left, or vice versa:

from right to left: הז יוא הז אהו
from left to right: אהו הז יוא הז.

== Haman is hanged (7:7–10) ==
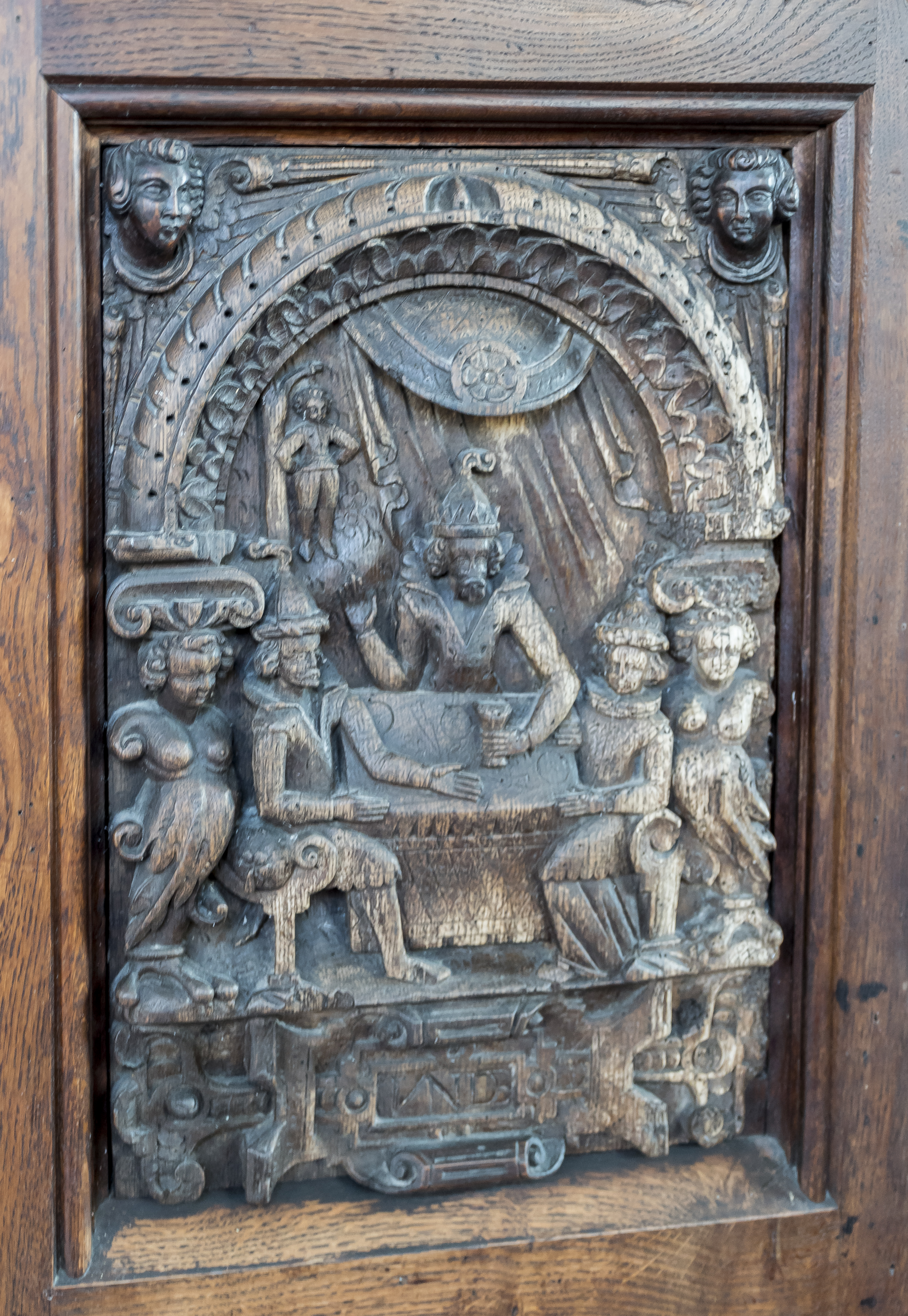
Elaborately carved relief figures in ornamental arcading tell the story in the Book of Esther; the king and Esther are sitting at the banquet with Haman. Ahasuerus is handing a cup to Haman. The gallows is in the background, with Haman's tiny figure hanging from it. St Martin's church pulpit. Arthur Mee 1938.

After hearing Esther's words, the king stomped out to his garden in a rage, but said nothing about reversing Haman's edict. Left alone with Esther, the terrified Haman plead for mercy, eventually falling upon the couch where she was reclining to, right when the king was back in the room. This led to the climactic reversal of the story, which occurs on a personal level, because the king only acts when his own wife is apparently threatened by Haman, just as he issued the decree that "all men are to be masters in their homes" (1:22) only after his previous wife's defiance. The king ordered to hang Haman on the gallows that Haman himself prepared (cf. Proverbs 11:27; 26:27). The impalement of the man who plotted against the queen and Mordecai who saved the king has a similarity to the impalement of the conspirators against the king reported by Mordecai (Esther 2:21). After the removal of the immediate threat to his wife, 'the king's anger is abated' (7:10, as in 2:1 when he had dealt with Vashti).

=== Verse 7 ===
And the king arising from the banquet of wine in his wrath went into the palace garden: and Haman stood up to make request for his life to Esther the queen; for he saw that there was evil determined against him by the king.

- "For he saw that there was evil determined against him by the king": from Hebrew: "for he saw that calamity was determined for him from the king"; NAB: "the king had decided on his doom"; NRSV: "the king had determined to destroy him"; NET Bible: "for he realized that the king had now determined a catastrophic end for him." It is recorded in the Masorah (footnotes of the Hebrew Bible text) of at least three old manuscripts, and noted at least as early as Bachya ben Asher in the thirteenth century, that God's divine name, YHWH, is present in four verses within the Book of Esther, but is deliberately hidden by means of the literary style of acrostics, formed by either the initial or final characters in consecutive and contiguous words in the text. One of these occurrences is found in this phrase in verse 7:7 (others are in 1:20; 5:4; 5:13), with the divine name written by final characters in 'majuscule' (bigger than the rest) and spelt forward (reading right-to-left). The significance of the final letters is linked to the interpretation that God is bringing about the end he had determined for Haman, and the forward positioning is because here 'God actively rules, underlining His initiative and direct interposition'.

Reading direction	Word order			
Right-to-left	4	3	2	1
Hebrew	ההרע	ואלי	הכלת	יכ
Left-to-right	1	2	3	4
Transliteration	kî(Y)	ḵā-lə-ṯāH	ê-lāW’	hā-rā-‘āH
English	that	was_determined	against_him	evil

== See also ==
- Eunuch
- Xerxes I
- Susa
- Related Bible parts: Esther 2

== Sources ==
- Clines, David J. A. (1988). "Esther". In Mays, James Luther; Blenkinsopp, Joseph (eds.). Harper's Bible Commentary (illustrated ed.). Harper & Row. pp. 387–394. ISBN 978-0060655419.
- Crawford, Sidnie White (2003). "Esther". In Dunn, James D. G.; Rogerson, John William (eds.). Eerdmans Commentary on the Bible (illustrated ed.). Wm. B. Eerdmans Publishing. pp. 329–336. ISBN 978-0802837110.
- Halley, Henry H. (1965). Halley's Bible Handbook: an abbreviated Bible commentary (24th (revised) ed.). Zondervan Publishing House. ISBN 0-310-25720-4.
- Larson, Knute; Dahlen, Kathy; Anders, Max E. (2005). Anders, Max E. (ed.). Holman Old Testament Commentary - Ezra, Nehemiah, Esther. Holman Old Testament commentary. Vol. 9 (illustrated ed.). B&H Publishing Group. ISBN 978-0805494693.
- Meyers, Carol (2007). "16. Esther". In Barton, John; Muddiman, John (eds.). The Oxford Bible Commentary (first (paperback) ed.). Oxford University Press. pp. 324–330. ISBN 978-0199277186.
- Moore, Carey A. (Sep–Dec 1975). "Archaeology and the Book of Esther". The Biblical Archaeologist. 38 (3/4): 62–79. doi:10.2307/3209587. JSTOR 3209587. S2CID 166110735.
- Smith, Gary (2018). Ezra, Nehemiah, Esther. Cornerstone Biblical Commentary. Vol. 5. Tyndale House. ISBN 978-1414399126.
- Turner, L. A. (2013). Desperately Seeking YHWH: Finding God in Esther's "Acrostics". Interested Readers. Essays on the Hebrew Bible in Honor of David J. A. Clines, 183–193.
- Würthwein, Ernst (1995). The Text of the Old Testament. Translated by Rhodes, Erroll F. Grand Rapids, MI: Wm. B. Eerdmans. ISBN 0-8028-0788-7.
