= Esther 5 =

Chapter in the Book of Esther

- ← chapter 4 chapter 6 →
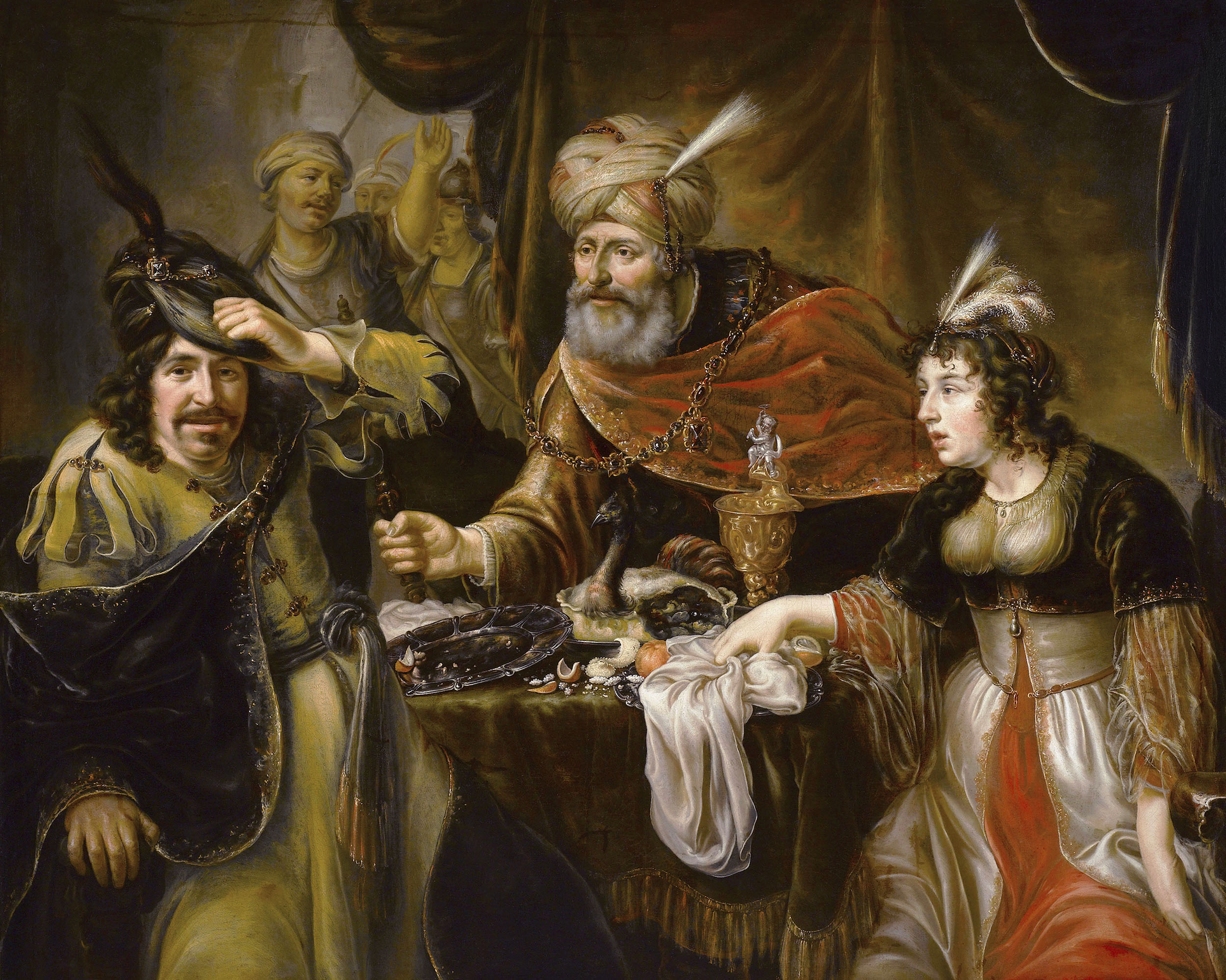
- "The Feast of Esther" by Johannes Spilberg the Younger.
- Book: Book of Esther
- Category: Ketuvim
- Christian Bible part: Old Testament
- Order in the Christian part: 17

Esther 5 is the fifth chapter of the Book of Esther in the Hebrew Bible or the Old Testament of the Christian Bible, The author of the book is unknown and modern scholars have established that the final stage of the Hebrew text would have been formed by the second century BCE. Chapters 3 to 8 contain the nine scenes that form the complication in the book. This chapter records that Esther's risky behavior to appear uninvited before the king Ahasuerus is richly rewarded, because the king generously offers to give her whatever she wants, 'even to the half of my kingdom' (5:3), but Esther cleverly asks for nothing more than an opportunity to entertain her husband and his chief officer, Haman. Both men were pleased at her hospitality, but when the king again offers her half the empire, this time she requests only a second banquet. While Haman was happy to have been entertained by the queen, he became intensely distressed when Mordecai once more refused to bow down before him. Haman's wife, Zeresh, advised him to erect a monumental gallows intended for Mordecai, and only then Haman felt happy again to look forward to Esther's second banquet.

== Text ==
This chapter was originally written in the Hebrew language and since the 16th century is divided into 14 verses.

=== Textual witnesses ===
Some early manuscripts containing the text of this chapter in Hebrew are of the Masoretic Text, which includes Codex Leningradensis (1008). (Note: Since 1947 the current text of Aleppo Codex is missing the whole book of Esther.)

There is also a translation into Koine Greek known as the Septuagint, made in the last few centuries BCE. Extant ancient manuscripts of the Septuagint version include Codex Vaticanus (B; $\mathfrak{G}$^{B}; 4th century), Codex Sinaiticus (S; BHK: $\mathfrak{G}$^{S}; 4th century), and Codex Alexandrinus (A; $\mathfrak{G}$^{A}; 5th century).

== Esther's first audience with the king and its outcome (5:1–8) ==
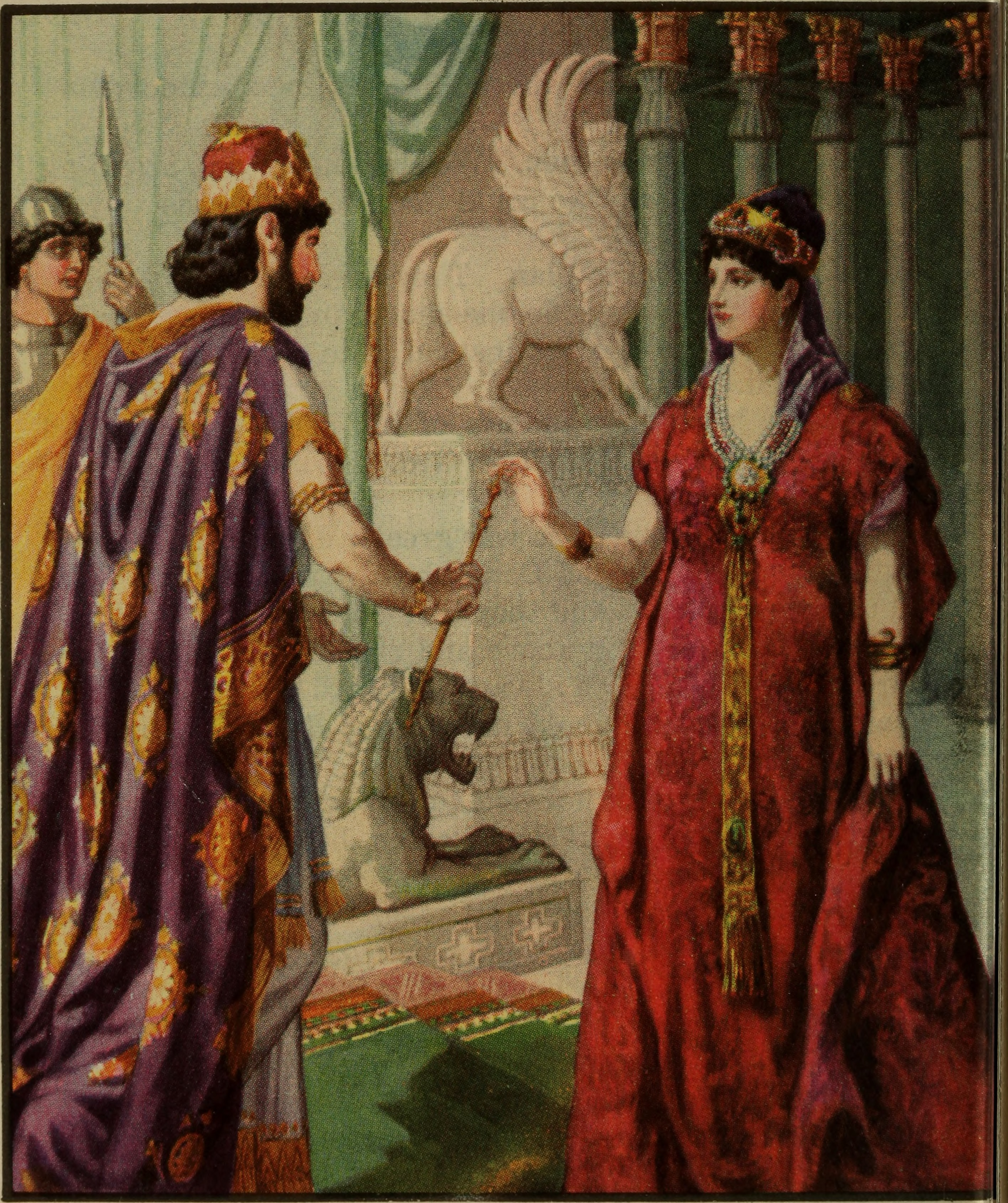
"Esther before the king". Bible primer, Old Testament, for use in the primary department of Sunday schools (1919).

This section records the first uninvited audience of Esther before king Ahasuerus. Esther was immediately successful in her approach: the king extended his scepter as a sign of clemency and promised to grant her wish up to half of his kingdom. However, she didn't use this opportunity to avert the decree of genocide and instead invited the king and Haman to a dinner party. The act indicates Esther's skills as a wise courtier because the seemingly simple request gives Esther several advantages to achieve her goal:

1. The king will be placed under obligation of courtesies to more likely grant her wish
2. The king and Haman will be positioned in Esther's territory, rather than in the male-dominated court.

=== Verse 1 ===
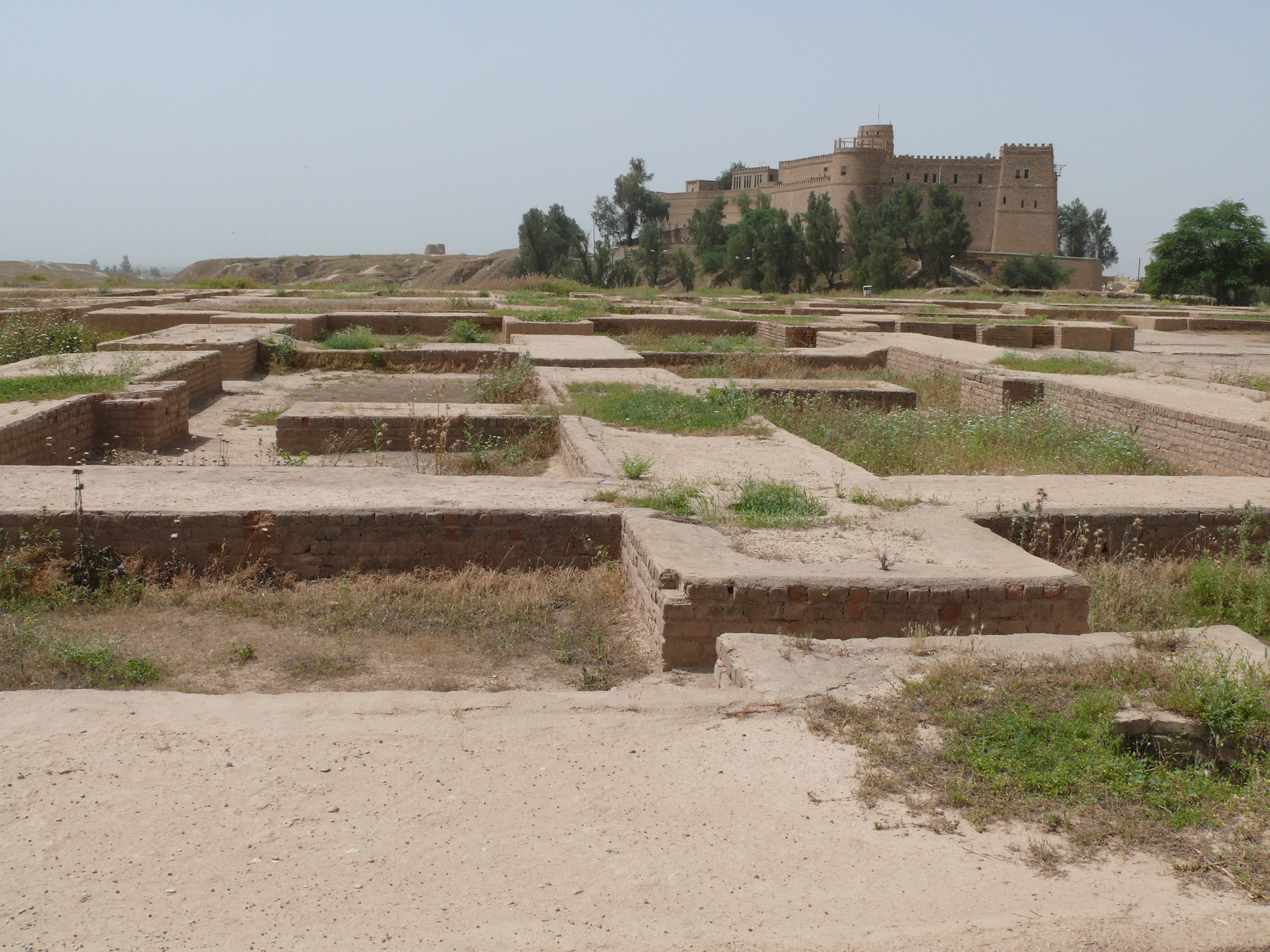
Persian king's private apartments in the central part of the palace (back: Castle of Archaeologist Jacques de Morgan), Susa, Iran (2007).

Now it came to pass on the third day, that Esther put on her royal apparel, and stood in the inner court of the king's house, over against the king's house: and the king sat upon his royal throne in the royal house, over against the gate of the house.

- "The king's house" (KJV): Hebrew: "the house of the king"; this expression is used twice in this verse: the first instance to describe 'the larger palace complex that is in view' ("the inner court"; NASB, NKJV, NRSV: "the king's palace"), whereas the second instance refers 'specifically to the quarters from which the king governed' (NASB: "the king's rooms"; NIV, NLT: "the king's hall"). This layout of the palace in Susa is attested by archaeological excavations.

=== Verse 3 ===
And the king said to her, "What is it, Queen Esther? What is your request? It shall be given you, even to the half of my kingdom."

- "What is it" (ESV, NAB, NIV, NRSV): from Hebrew: "what to you".

=== Verse 4 ===
So Esther answered, "If it pleases the king, let the king and Haman come today to the banquet that I have prepared for him."

- "If it pleases the king": Hebrew: "If it is good to the king".
- "Let the king and Haman come today": It is recorded in the Masorah (footnotes of the Hebrew Bible text) of at least three old manuscripts, and noted at least as early as Bachya ben Asher in the thirteenth century, that God's divine name, YHWH, is present in four verses within the Book of Esther, but is deliberately hidden by means of the literary style of acrostics, formed by either the initial or final characters in consecutive and contiguous words in the text. One of these occurrences is found in verse 5:4 (others are in 1:20; 5:13; 7:7), with the divine name written by initial characters in 'majuscule' (bigger than the rest) and spelt forward (reading right-to-left), The significance of the initial letters is linked to the interpretation that in this event 'God is initiating His action,' causing Esther to take the first step leading to a great end, and the forward positioning is because here 'God actively rules, underlining His initiative and direct interposition'.

=== Verse 5 ===
Haman also said, “Even Esther the queen let no one but me come with the king to the banquet which she had prepared; and tomorrow also I am invited by her with the king.

Reading direction	Word order			
Right-to-left	4	3	2	1
Hebrew	יוםה	המןו	מלךה	בואי
Left-to-right	1	2	3	4
Transliteration	Yā-ḇō-w	Ha-me-leḵ	Wə-hā-mān	Ha-yōm
English	Let_come	the_king	and_Haman	today

== Haman grows more incensed against Mordecai (5:9–14) ==
This pericope shows that Haman is a dangerous foe who was constantly full of wrath for being worsted by his inferior, Mordecai, so he planned to butcher the whole population of Jews to appease his own sense of inferiority. Haman would not enjoy all his honors as long as there was one Jew who did not give him the customary respect he wanted. His friends understood that Haman wanted not only Mordecai dead, but also be humiliated publicly, so they suggested the setting up of high gallows for Mordecai to appease Haman. Nonetheless, Modercai's continued defiance against Haman is 'enigmatic', as he still held it while knowing that his action has placed the Jews in great mortal danger.

=== Verse 13 ===
[Haman said:] "Yet all this avails me nothing, so long as I see Mordecai the Jew sitting at the king's gate."

- "This avails me nothing": As described in Esther 5:4, God's divine name, YHWH, is present in four verses within the Book of Esther, but is deliberately hidden by means of the literary style of acrostics, formed by either the initial or final characters in consecutive and contiguous words in the text. One of these occurrences is found in verse 5:13 (others are in 1:20, 5:4; 7:7), with the divine name written by last characters in 'majuscule' (bigger than the rest) but spelt backward (reading left-to-right), The significance of the final letters is because in this event 'Haman's end was approaching', as his joy at the first banquet of Esther (5:9) would be his last, and the backward positioning is because here God is turning back Haman's counsel 'in order to bring to fruition his eternal purposes', as well as because it is spoken by a non-Jew (Haman) who 'instigates the crisis which needs to be reversed'.

Reading direction	Word order			
Right-to-left	4	3	2	1
Hebrew	יל	השו	ואיננ	הז
Left-to-right	1	2	3	4
Transliteration	zeH	’ê-nen-nū(W)	šō-weH	lî(Y)
English	This	nothing	avails	me

=== Verse 14 ===
Then his wife Zeresh and all his friends said to him, "Let a gallows be made, fifty cubits high, and in the morning suggest to the king that Mordecai be hanged on it; then go merrily with the king to the banquet."
And the thing pleased Haman; so he had the gallows made.

- "Gallows": Lit. "tree" or "wood".
- "Fifty cubits": About 75 feet.

== See also ==
- Xerxes I
- Susa
- Related Bible parts: Daniel 3

== Sources ==
- Clines, David J. A. (1988). "Esther". In Mays, James Luther; Blenkinsopp, Joseph (eds.). Harper's Bible Commentary (illustrated ed.). Harper & Row. pp. 387–394. ISBN 978-0060655419.
- Crawford, Sidnie White (2003). "Esther". In Dunn, James D. G.; Rogerson, John William (eds.). Eerdmans Commentary on the Bible (illustrated ed.). Wm. B. Eerdmans Publishing. pp. 329–336. ISBN 978-0802837110.
- Halley, Henry H. (1965). Halley's Bible Handbook: an abbreviated Bible commentary (24th (revised) ed.). Zondervan Publishing House. ISBN 0-310-25720-4.
- Larson, Knute; Dahlen, Kathy; Anders, Max E. (2005). Anders, Max E. (ed.). Holman Old Testament Commentary - Ezra, Nehemiah, Esther. Holman Old Testament commentary. Vol. 9 (illustrated ed.). B&H Publishing Group. ISBN 978-0805494693.
- Meyers, Carol (2007). "16. Esther". In Barton, John; Muddiman, John (eds.). The Oxford Bible Commentary (first (paperback) ed.). Oxford University Press. pp. 324–330. ISBN 978-0199277186.
- Moore, Carey A. (Sep–Dec 1975). "Archaeology and the Book of Esther". The Biblical Archaeologist. 38 (3/4): 62–79. doi:10.2307/3209587. JSTOR 3209587. S2CID 166110735.
- Smith, Gary (2018). Ezra, Nehemiah, Esther. Cornerstone Biblical Commentary. Vol. 5. Tyndale House. ISBN 978-1414399126.
- Turner, L. A. (2013). Desperately Seeking YHWH: Finding God in Esther's "Acrostics". Interested Readers. Essays on the Hebrew Bible in Honor of David J. A. Clines, 183–193.
- Würthwein, Ernst (1995). The Text of the Old Testament. Translated by Rhodes, Erroll F. Grand Rapids, MI: Wm. B. Eerdmans. ISBN 0-8028-0788-7.
