= Esther 10 =

Chapter in the Book of Esther

- ← chapter 9 Job 1 →
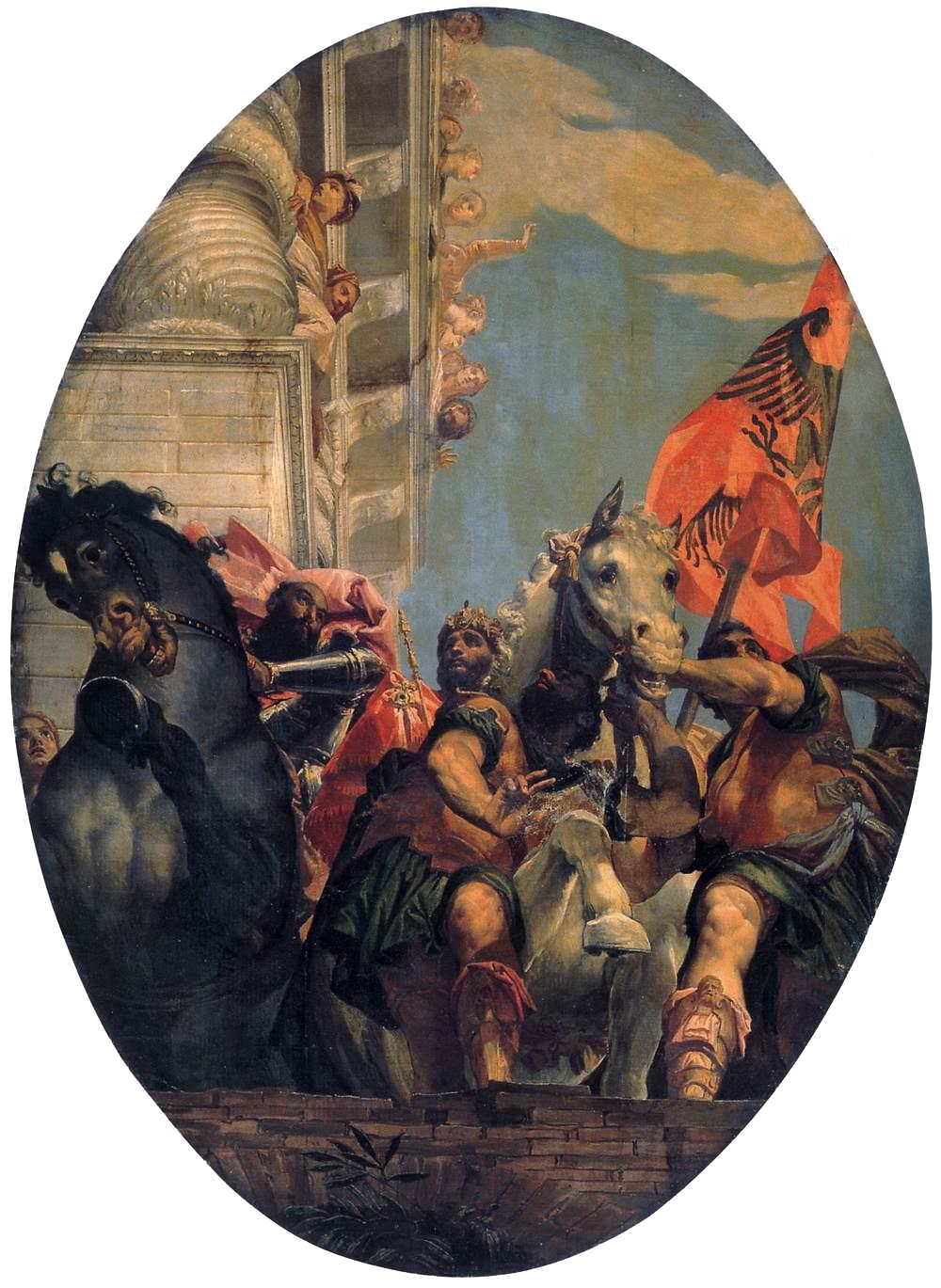
- The Triumph of Mordecai (1556), by Paolo Veronese (1528–1588).
- Book: Book of Esther
- Category: Ketuvim
- Christian Bible part: Old Testament
- Order in the Christian part: 17

Esther 10 is the tenth (and the final) chapter of the Book of Esther in the Hebrew Bible or the Old Testament of the Christian Bible, The author of the book is unknown and modern scholars have established that the final stage of the Hebrew text would have been formed by the second century BCE. Chapters 9 and 10 contain the resolution of the stories in the book. This brief chapter is an encomium to Mordecai, showing his power alongside that of the king, being a Jew as second in command to a Gentile king, serving the interests of both groups, Persians and Jews. It is a picture of an 'ideal diaspora situation' and 'serves as a model for all diaspora communities'.

== Text ==
This chapter was originally written in the Hebrew language and since the 16th century is divided into 3 verses.

=== Textual witnesses ===
Some early manuscripts containing the text of this chapter in Hebrew are of the Masoretic Text, which includes Codex Leningradensis (1008). (Note: Since 1947 the current text of Aleppo Codex is missing the whole book of Esther.)

There is also a translation into Koine Greek known as the Septuagint, made in the last few centuries BCE. Extant ancient manuscripts of the Septuagint version include Codex Vaticanus (B; $\mathfrak{G}$^{B}; 4th century), Codex Sinaiticus (S; BHK: $\mathfrak{G}$^{S}; 4th century), and Codex Alexandrinus (A; $\mathfrak{G}$^{A}; 5th century).

=== Verse 1 ===
And the king Ahasuerus laid a tribute upon the land, and upon the isles of the sea.

The statement serves to compliment Mordecai's position in the Persian empire in the next verses.

=== Verse 2 ===
And all the acts of his power and of his might, and the declaration of the greatness of Mordecai, whereunto the king advanced him, are they not written in the book of the chronicles of the kings of Media and Persia?

- "Advanced him": Lit. "made him great".

=== Verse 3 ===
For Mordecai the Jew was next unto king Ahasuerus, and great among the Jews, and accepted of the multitude of his brethren, seeking the wealth of his people, and speaking peace to all his seed.

This verse shows that a highly esteemed Jew could still be the highest ranked Persian official.

== See also ==
- Xerxes I
- Susa
- Related Bible parts: Esther 2, Esther 9

== Sources ==
- Clines, David J. A. (1988). "Esther". In Mays, James Luther; Blenkinsopp, Joseph (eds.). Harper's Bible Commentary (illustrated ed.). Harper & Row. pp. 387–394. ISBN 978-0060655419.
- Halley, Henry H. (1965). Halley's Bible Handbook: an abbreviated Bible commentary (24th (revised) ed.). Zondervan Publishing House. ISBN 0-310-25720-4.
- Larson, Knute; Dahlen, Kathy; Anders, Max E. (2005). Anders, Max E. (ed.). Holman Old Testament Commentary - Ezra, Nehemiah, Esther. Holman Old Testament commentary. Vol. 9 (illustrated ed.). B&H Publishing Group. ISBN 978-0805494693.
- Meyers, Carol (2007). "16. Esther". In Barton, John; Muddiman, John (eds.). The Oxford Bible Commentary (first (paperback) ed.). Oxford University Press. pp. 324–330. ISBN 978-0199277186.
- Würthwein, Ernst (1995). The Text of the Old Testament. Translated by Rhodes, Erroll F. Grand Rapids, MI: Wm. B. Eerdmans. ISBN 0-8028-0788-7.
