= Esther 8 =

Chapter in the Book of Esther

- ← chapter 7 chapter 9 →
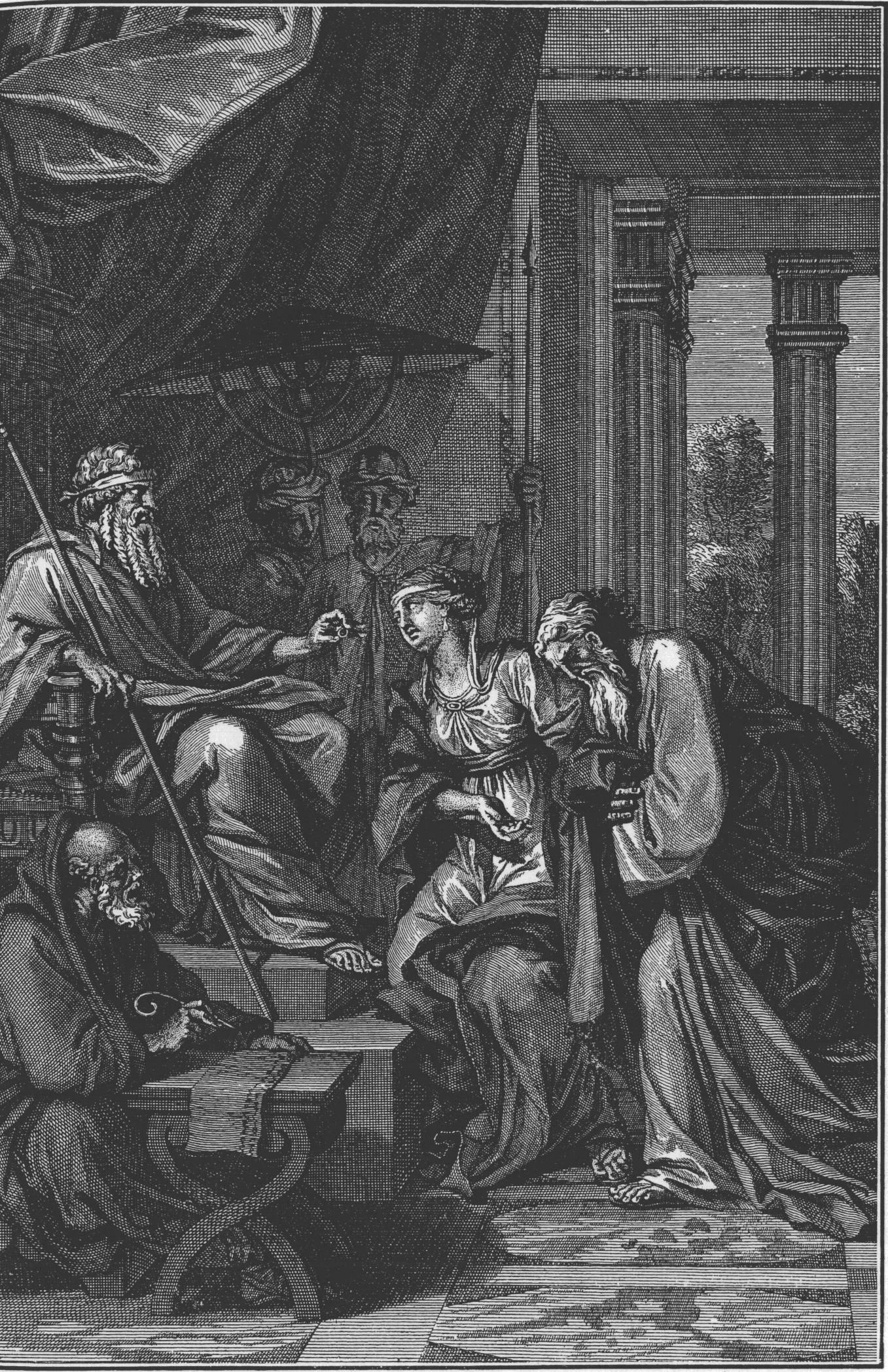
- Esther 8:2. “Mordecai receives the king's ring”. Printed in "Figures de la Bible", P. de Hondt (publisher), The Hague, 1728.
- Book: Book of Esther
- Category: Ketuvim
- Christian Bible part: Old Testament
- Order in the Christian part: 17

Esther 8 is the eighth chapter of the Book of Esther in the Hebrew Bible or the Old Testament of the Christian Bible, The author of the book is unknown and modern scholars have established that the final stage of the Hebrew text would have been formed by the second century BCE. Chapters 3 to 8 contain the nine scenes that form the complication in the book. This chapter contains the effort to deal with the irreversible decree against the Jews now that Haman is dead and Mordecai is elevated to the position of prime minister.

== Text ==
This chapter was originally written in the Hebrew language and since the 16th century is divided into 17 verses.

=== Textual witnesses ===
Some early manuscripts containing the text of this chapter in Hebrew are of the Masoretic Text, which includes Codex Leningradensis (1008). (Note: Since 1947 the current text of Aleppo Codex is missing the whole book of Esther.)

There is also a translation into Koine Greek known as the Septuagint, made in the last few centuries BCE. Extant ancient manuscripts of the Septuagint version include Codex Vaticanus (B; $\mathfrak{G}$^{B}; 4th century), Codex Sinaiticus (S; BHK: $\mathfrak{G}$^{S}; 4th century), and Codex Alexandrinus (A; $\mathfrak{G}$^{A}; 5th century).

== Esther saves the Jews (8:1–8) ==
The death of Haman does not change the fact that the irreversible decree to destroy the Jews, written in the king's name and sealed with his ring (Esther 3:12), still stands. The king gave Haman's household to Esther and gave Mordecai Haman's signet ring, but he refused to regard it as his problem, even as Esther tearfully begged the king to "avert the evil design of Haman the Agagite" (verse 7). Thus, Mordecai and Esther together had to come up with a solution, after receiving the king's permission to "write whatever (they) like about the Jews" (verse 8).

=== Verse 1 ===
On that day King Ahasuerus gave to Queen Esther the house of Haman, the enemy of the Jews. And Mordecai came before the king, for Esther had told what he was to her.

The king may see the giving of Haman's house to Esther as suitable compensation because Haman has wronged her in two ways:

1. plotting her death, along with the death of her people
2. attacking her person in the second banquet.

=== Verse 2 ===
And the king took off his signet ring, which he had taken from Haman, and gave it to Mordecai.
And Esther set Mordecai over the house of Haman.

The second part of verse 2 displays a shift of the focus to Esther, as she is now the one who makes decisions.

=== Verse 3 ===
Then Esther spoke again to the king and fell down at his feet and begged him with tears to avert the evil of Haman the Agagite, and the scheme that he had devised against the Jews.

The change of tone of Esther's petition before the king indicates her awareness that the gift of Haman's house to her and the signet ring to Mordecai won't do any good after the thirteenth of Adar as long as the decree to annihilate the Jews still stands. Esther only mentioned Haman as the sole enemy of the Jews (cf. Esther 7:4) and avoided implicating the king in this plot.

=== Verse 6 ===
For how can I endure to see the evil that shall come unto my people? or how can I endure to see the destruction of my kindred?

Esther used the same two terms — 'people' and 'kindred' as she reversed the act of concealing her identity previously in Esther 2:10, when she entered the harem.

=== Verse 8 ===
Write ye also for the Jews, as it liketh you, in the king's name, and seal it with the king's ring: for the writing which is written in the king's name, and sealed with the king's ring, may no man reverse.

- "As it liketh you": from Hebrew: "as is good in your eyes."

== Mordecai's balancing act (8:9–17) ==
The narrative starts with an elaborate description of the system to dispatch the letters conveying the solutions (verses 9–10), then of the content which reveals Mordecai's ingenious ploy: a second decree without contradicting the first one but effectively annulling it by authorizing the Jews to defend themselves against those executing the first decree (verse 11). Both Jews and non-Jews throughout the empire saw the second decree as a bloodless victory for the Jewish cause and the Jews were clearly perceived to have the upper hand that many non-Jews spontaneously converted to Judaism (verse 17).

=== Verse 9 ===
So the king’s scribes were called at that time, in the third month, which is the month of Sivan, on the twenty-third day; and it was written, according to all that Mordecai commanded, to the Jews, the satraps, the governors, and the princes of the provinces from India to Ethiopia, one hundred and twenty-seven provinces in all, to every province in its own script, to every people in their own language, and to the Jews in their own script and language.

- "The month of Sivan, on the twenty-third day": Two months and ten days since Haman's edict to wipe out the Jews (cf. Esther 3:12).

=== Verse 11 ===
By these letters the king permitted the Jews who were in every city to gather together and protect their lives—to destroy, kill, and annihilate all the forces of any people or province that would assault them, both little children and women, and to plunder their possessions,

This second edict can be compared and contrasted to the first one as recorded in Esther 3:13:

Esther 3:13	Esther 8:11
First edict	Second edict
Order to to destroy, kill, and annihilate	Permission to to destroy, kill, and annihilate
Undisguised aggression	Self-defense
Violence against general Jewish population	Violence in response to "any armed force ...that might attack" the Jewish population

=== Verse 15 ===
And Mordecai went out from the presence of the king in royal apparel of blue and white, and with a great crown of gold, and with a garment of fine linen and purple: and the city of Shushan rejoiced and was glad.

- "Shushan": or "Susa".

=== Verse 17 ===
And in every province, and in every city, whithersoever the king's commandment and his decree came, the Jews had joy and gladness, a feast and a good day. And many of the people of the land became Jews; for the fear of the Jews fell upon them.

This verse can be compared and contrasted to Esther 3:15:

Bible verse	Esther 3:15	Esther 8:17
After the issue of	First edict	Second edict
Celebration	The king and Haman sat down to drink	The Jews had ... a feast and a good day
Confusion	The city of Susa was in uproar	Many people of the land became Jews

== See also ==
- Xerxes I
- Susa
- Related Bible parts: Esther 1, Esther 2, Esther 3

== Sources ==
- Bechtel, Carol (1983). Esther. Westminster John Knox Press. ISBN 978-0664237455.
- Clines, David J. A. (1988). "Esther". In Mays, James Luther; Blenkinsopp, Joseph (eds.). Harper's Bible Commentary (illustrated ed.). Harper & Row. pp. 387–394. ISBN 978-0060655419.
- Halley, Henry H. (1965). Halley's Bible Handbook: an abbreviated Bible commentary (24th (revised) ed.). Zondervan Publishing House. ISBN 0-310-25720-4.
- Larson, Knute; Dahlen, Kathy; Anders, Max E. (2005). Anders, Max E. (ed.). Holman Old Testament Commentary - Ezra, Nehemiah, Esther. Holman Old Testament commentary. Vol. 9 (illustrated ed.). B&H Publishing Group. ISBN 978-0805494693.
- Meyers, Carol (2007). "16. Esther". In Barton, John; Muddiman, John (eds.). The Oxford Bible Commentary (first (paperback) ed.). Oxford University Press. pp. 324–330. ISBN 978-0199277186.
- Würthwein, Ernst (1995). The Text of the Old Testament. Translated by Rhodes, Erroll F. Grand Rapids, MI: Wm. B. Eerdmans. ISBN 0-8028-0788-7.
