= Esther 1 =

Chapter in the Book of Esther

- ← Nehemiah 13 chapter 2 →
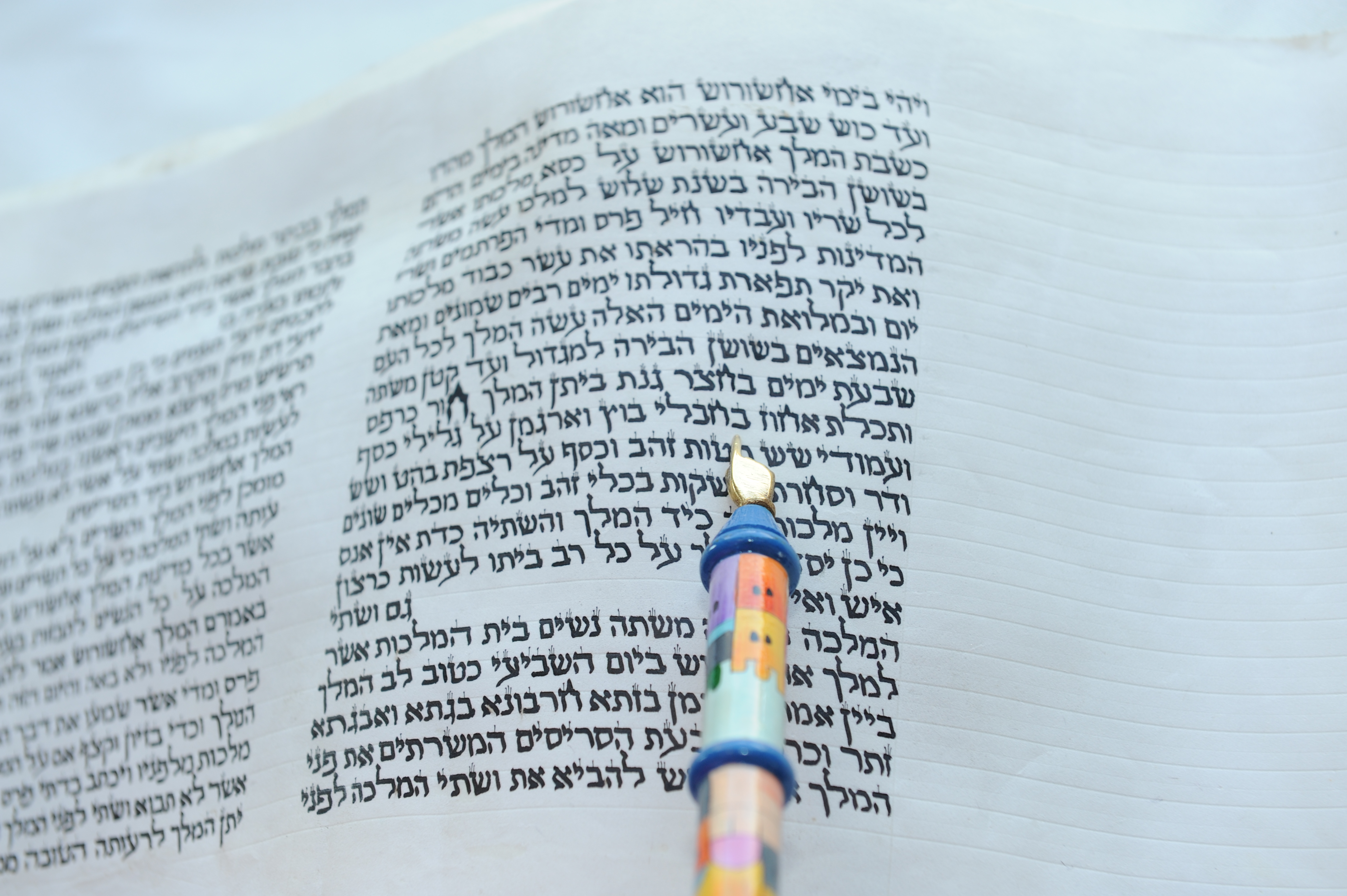
- First chapter of a hand-written scroll of the Book of Esther, with reader's pointer.
- Book: Book of Esther
- Category: Ketuvim
- Christian Bible part: Old Testament
- Order in the Christian part: 17

Esther 1 is the first chapter of the Book of Esther in the Hebrew Bible or the Old Testament of the Christian Bible. The author of the book is unknown and modern scholars have established that the final stage of the Hebrew text would have been formed by the second century BCE. Chapters 1 and 2 form the exposition of the book. This chapter records the royal banquets of the Persian king Ahasuerus until the deposal of queen Vashti.

== Text ==
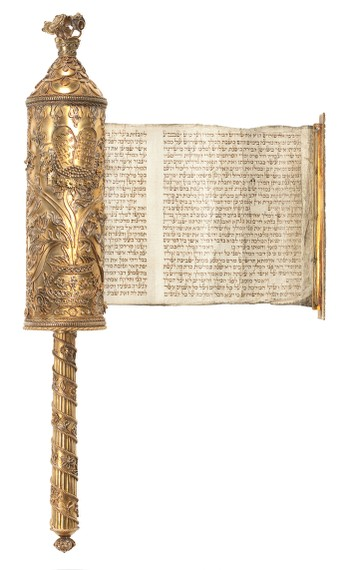
’’Megillat Esther’’ or “Esther Scroll” (18th century).

This chapter was originally written in the Hebrew language and since the 16th century is divided into 22 verses.

=== Textual witnesses ===
Some early manuscripts containing the text of this chapter in Hebrew are of the Masoretic Text, which includes Codex Leningradensis (1008). (Note: Since 1947 the current text of Aleppo Codex is missing the whole book of Esther.)

There is also a translation into Koine Greek known as the Septuagint, made in the last few centuries BCE. Extant ancient manuscripts of the Septuagint version include Codex Vaticanus (B; $\mathfrak{G}$^{B}; 4th century), Codex Sinaiticus (S; BHK: $\mathfrak{G}$^{S}; 4th century), and Codex Alexandrinus (A; $\mathfrak{G}$^{A}; 5th century).

== Royal banquet for the officials (1:1–4) ==
The opening section describes the sumptuous 180-day banquet by the Persian king Ahasuerus for officials from all over the Persian Empire.

=== Verse 1 ===
Now it came to pass, in the days of Ahasuerus, (this is Ahasuerus which reigned, from India even unto Ethiopia, over an hundred and seven and twenty provinces:)

- "Ahasuerus": Generally identified with Xerxes I (485–464 BC). In Esther 10:1 the name is written as Achashresh, which shows more resemblance to the name recorded by the Greeks, Axeres or Xerxes.

Two other persons are called by this name in the Old Testament:
- (1) the Ahasuerus of Daniel 9:1, the father of “Darius the Mede;” if this Darius is the same with Astyages, Ahasuerus could be identified with Cyaxares.
- (2) the Ahasuerus of Ezra 4:6, who is identified with Cambyses, the son of Cyrus.

- "From India even unto Ethiopia": from Hebrew: מהדו ועד־כוש, mê-hō-dū wə-‘aḏ-kūsh, "from_India and_to Cush (=Ethiopia)". A foundation stone found at the site of Persepolis palace displays the title and territory of Xerxes I, very similar to those of Ahasuerus, with the words:

"I am Xerxes, the great king, the only king, the king of (all) countries (which speak) all kinds of languages, the king of this (entire) big and far-reaching earth… These are the countries — in addition to Persia — over which I am king … which are bringing their tribute to me — whatever is commanded them by me, that they do and they abide by my law(s) — Media, Elam … India … (and) Cush."

The vast territorial claims are also confirmed by Herodotus (Histories III.97; VII.9, 65, 69f).

=== Verse 2 ===
That in those days, when the king Ahasuerus sat on the throne of his kingdom, which was in Shushan the palace,

- "Shushan": or "Susa". The city of Susa served during this time as one of several capitals of Persia, beside Ecbatana, Babylon, and Persepolis. Partly due to the extreme heat of its summers, Susa was a place where Persian kings stayed mainly in the winter months. Strabo wrote that reptiles attempting to cross roads at midday died from the extreme heat of Susa (Geographica 15.3.10-11).
- "The palace" (KJV): from Hebrew word בִּירָה (birah) can refer to a castle or palace or temple; NKJV: "citadel" or "fortified palace", and so elsewhere in the book; NAB "stronghold"; NASB "capital"; NLT “fortress”; seemingly pointing to 'the fortified part of the city that might be called an acropolis or citadel'. A bell-shaped column base bearing the name of Xerxes was unearthed in the ruins of the palace in Susa.

=== Verse 3 ===
In the third year of his reign, he made a feast unto all his princes and his servants; the power of Persia and Media, the nobles and princes of the provinces, being before him:

- "The third year": of Xerxes' reign would be 483 BC. Xerxes succeeded his father, Darius Hystaspes in the year 485 BC, five years after the battle of Marathon. Xerses set out in 481 BC from Susa to attack Greece, staying for winter at Sardis, starting the attack in the spring of 480 BC to see the Battle of Thermopylae against Leonidas and his three hundred men in the summer, but lost to Themistocles at Salamis in the autumn, then at Platæa and Mycale in 479 BC. Xerxes fled to Sardis before returning to Persia in the spring of 478 BC. In 464 BC, he was murdered by two of his officers, Mithridates and Artabanus, so Artaxerxes Longimanus, his son (see Ezra 7; Nehemiah 2), reigned to succeed him.
- "The power (of Persia and Media)": NAB: "Persian and Median aristocracy"; NASB: "the army officers"; NIV: "the military leaders".
- "Persia and Media" (cf. verses 14, 18, 19): a different order from the expression "Media and Persia" in the Book of Daniel, which indicates an earlier time in the history when Media was more prominent within the coalition of the two nations.

The immense size of the banquet, the number of its invited guests, and the length of its duration described here, was not without precedence as C. A. Moore documents a Persian banquet for 15,000 people and an Assyrian celebration with 69,574 guests in ancient times.

== Royal banquet for the citizens of Susa (1:5–9) ==
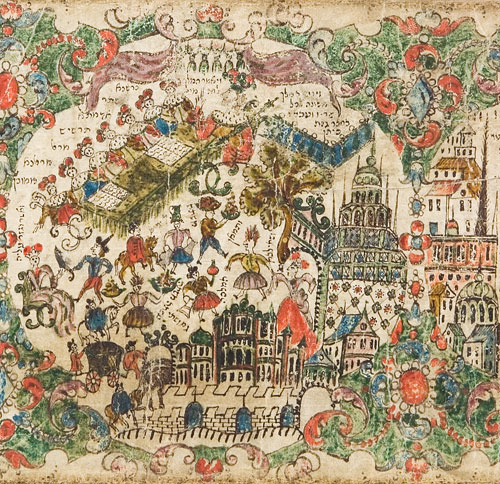
An intricately illustration of the royal banquet in an early 18th-century manuscript scroll of the Book of Esther.

This section narrows the focus to the subsequent shorter but equally pretentious 7-day banquets, given separately by the king (for males) and the queen (for females) for the citizens of the Persian capital Susa.

=== Verse 6 ===
Where were white, green, and blue, hangings, fastened with cords of fine linen and purple to silver rings and pillars of marble: the beds were of gold and silver, upon a pavement of red, and blue, and white, and black, marble.

- "Fine linen": which is the finest linen called byssus, a fine, costly, white fabric made in Egypt, Palestine, and Edom, and imported into Persia. (Note: BDB 101 s.v. בּוּץ; HALOT 115-16 s.v. בּוּץ.)
- "Beds" (KJV): from the Hebrew noun מִטָּה (mittah) refers to a reclining couch spread with covers, cloth and pillow for feasting and carousing (Ezekiel 23:41; Amos 3:12; 6:4; Esther 1:6; 7:8). (Note: See BDB 641-42 s.v.; HALOT 573 s.v.)

== Vashti's refusal to obey king's command (1:10–22) ==
On the seventh day of the banquet, the king sent for Queen Vashti to appear before him "to show off her beauty", but she refused to come. This causes histrionic reactions from the king and his seven counselors which resulted in the issuance of punishment for Vashti and a decree involving the 'whole elaborate machinery of Persian law and administration' to spread it in all over Persian lands.

=== Verse 13 ===
Then the king said to the wise men, which knew the times, (for so was the king's manner toward all that knew law and judgment:)

It has been noted that "It is an irony, that the king who reigns over a vast empire cannot resolve his domestic problem about his own wife without the help of the sharpest minds of Persia." The seven counselors who advise the king (cf. Ezra 7:14) are literally "those who see the face of the king" (verse 14).

=== Verse 20 ===
And when the king's decree which he shall make shall be published throughout all his empire, (for it is great,) all the wives shall give to their husbands honour, both to great and small.

- "Decree": from Hebrew: pithgam, a loan-word from Old Persian patigâma (from root word: patigam, "to come to, arrive"); also written in its Aramaic form (pithgâmâ) in Ezra 4:17; Ezra 5:7; Ezra 5:11.
- "Published" (KJV, NAB, NLT): from Hebrew "heard"; NIV, NRSV: "proclaimed".
- "All the wives shall give": It is recorded in the Masorah (footnotes of the Hebrew Bible text) of at least three old manuscripts, and noted at least as early as Bachya ben Asher in the thirteenth century, that God's divine name, YHWH, is present in four verses within the Book of Esther, but is deliberately hidden by means of the literary style of acrostics, formed by either the initial or final characters in consecutive and contiguous words in the text. One of these occurrences is found in verse 1:20 (others are in 5:4; 5:13; 7:7), with the divine name written by initial characters in 'majuscule' (bigger than the rest) but spelt backward (reading left-to-right), Bullinger suggests that the significance of the initial letters is because the event was initial in the story and the backward positioning is because here 'God is turning back human wisdom and ambition in order to bring to fruition his eternal purposes', as well as because it is spoken by a non-Jew (Memucan), who 'instigates the crisis which needs to be reversed'.

Reading direction	Word order			
Right-to-left	4	3	2	1
Hebrew	תנוי	נשיםה	כלו	יאה
Left-to-right	1	2	3	4
Transliteration	Hî	Wə-ḵāl	Ha-nā-shîm	Yi-tə-nū
English	it	and_all	the_wives	shall give

== See also ==
- Xerxes I
- Susa
- Related Bible parts: Nehemiah 1, Daniel 6, Daniel 8

== Sources ==
- Clines, David J. A. (1988). "Esther". In Mays, James Luther; Blenkinsopp, Joseph (eds.). Harper's Bible Commentary (illustrated ed.). Harper & Row. pp. 387–394. ISBN 978-0060655419.
- Crawford, Sidnie White (2003). "Esther". In Dunn, James D. G.; Rogerson, John William (eds.). Eerdmans Commentary on the Bible (illustrated ed.). Wm. B. Eerdmans Publishing. pp. 329–336. ISBN 978-0802837110.
- Halley, Henry H. (1965). Halley's Bible Handbook: an abbreviated Bible commentary (24th (revised) ed.). Zondervan Publishing House. ISBN 0-310-25720-4.
- Larson, Knute; Dahlen, Kathy; Anders, Max E. (2005). Anders, Max E. (ed.). Holman Old Testament Commentary - Ezra, Nehemiah, Esther. Holman Old Testament commentary. Vol. 9 (illustrated ed.). B&H Publishing Group. ISBN 978-0805494693.
- Meyers, Carol (2007). "16. Esther". In Barton, John; Muddiman, John (eds.). The Oxford Bible Commentary (first (paperback) ed.). Oxford University Press. pp. 324–330. ISBN 978-0199277186.
- Moore, Carey A. (1975). "Archaeology and the Book of Esther". The Biblical Archaeologist. 38 (3/4): 62–79. doi:10.2307/3209587. JSTOR 3209587. S2CID 166110735.
- Smith, Gary (2018). Ezra, Nehemiah, Esther. Cornerstone Biblical Commentary. Vol. 5. Tyndale House. ISBN 978-1414399126.
- Turner, L. A. (2013). Desperately Seeking YHWH: Finding God in Esther's "Acrostics". Interested Readers. Essays on the Hebrew Bible in Honor of David J. A. Clines, 183–193.
- Würthwein, Ernst (1995). The Text of the Old Testament. Translated by Rhodes, Erroll F. Grand Rapids, MI: Wm. B. Eerdmans. ISBN 0-8028-0788-7.
