= Zeresh =

Biblical figure in the Hebrew Bible

Zeresh (Hebrew: זֶרֶשׁ) was the wife of Haman the Agagite who is mentioned in the Hebrew Bible in the Book of Esther.

== Etymology ==
The etymology of the name Zeresh is debated. Some scholars suggest that the name may derive from the Avestan word zairiçi, ‘blonde’, while others have related it to the Elamite deity Kiriša or to an Avestan demoness.

== Role in Book of Esther ==
Zeresh advised her husband to prepare a high gallows (50 cubits) and to hang Mordecai on it (Esther 5:14). However, she later advised Haman that he would not be able to win against Mordecai (Esther 6:12-13). Their plans were soon reversed when King Ahasuerus ordered Haman to be hanged on the same gallows which he had prepared for Mordecai (Esther 7:9-10).

Ten sons of Haman (and possibly of Zeresh) were later killed in fighting, and Ahasuerus had their bodies hanged on the same gallows that their father was hanged on (Esther 9:7-14). Zeresh's fate is not recorded.
