= Esther 2 =

Chapter in the Book of Esther

- ← chapter 1 chapter 3 →
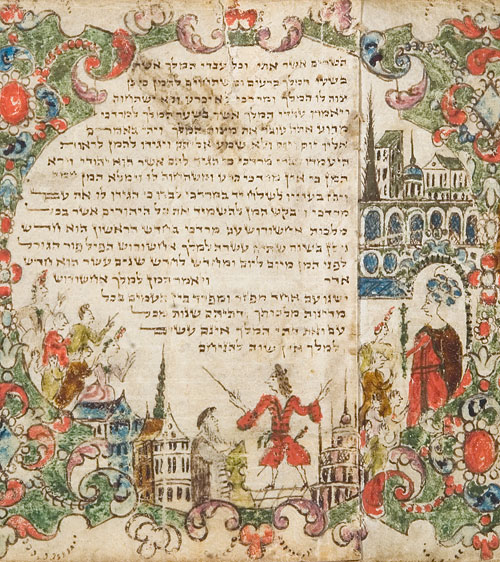
- An intricately illustrated early 18th-century manuscript scroll of the Book of Esther.
- Book: Book of Esther
- Category: Ketuvim
- Christian Bible part: Old Testament
- Order in the Christian part: 17

Esther 2 is the second chapter of the Book of Esther in the Hebrew Bible or the Old Testament of the Christian Bible. The author of the book is unknown and modern scholars have established that the final stage of the Hebrew text would have been formed by the second century BCE. Chapters 1 and 2 form the exposition of the book. This chapter introduces Mordecai and his adoptive daughter, Esther, whose beauty won the approval of the king Ahasuerus, and she was crowned the queen of Persia (verse 17). Given information from Mordecai, Esther warned the king of an assassination plan (verses 21–22), so that the would-be assassins were executed on the gallows, and the king owed Mordecai his life.

== Text ==
This chapter was originally written in the Hebrew language and since the 16th century, is divided into 23 verses.

=== Textual witnesses ===
Some early manuscripts containing the text of this chapter in Hebrew are of the Masoretic Text, which includes Codex Leningradensis (1008). (Note: Since 1947 the current text of Aleppo Codex is missing the whole book of Esther.)

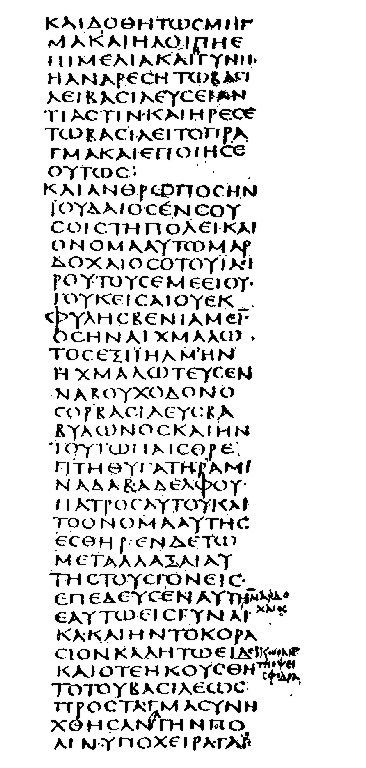
The Greek text of Esther 2:3–8 in the Codex Sinaiticus.

There is also a translation into Koine Greek known as the Septuagint, made in the last few centuries BCE. Extant ancient manuscripts of the Septuagint version include Codex Vaticanus (B; $\mathfrak{G}$^{B}; 4th century), Codex Sinaiticus (S; BHK: $\mathfrak{G}$^{S}; 4th century), and Codex Alexandrinus (A; $\mathfrak{G}$^{A}; 5th century).

== The king's decision to seek a new queen (2:1–4) ==
To find a replacement for a Persian queen after the deposal of Vashti, the king decided to hold a nationwide contest following the advice of his counselors.

=== Verse 3 ===
And let the king appoint officers in all the provinces of his kingdom, that they may gather together all the fair young virgins unto Shushan the palace, to the house of the women, unto the custody of Hege the king's chamberlain, keeper of the women; and let their things for purification be given them:

- "Shushan": or "Susa".
- "The palace" (KJV): from Hebrew word בִּירָה (birah); NKJV: "citadel".
- "Hege" (Hebrew: הֵגֶ֛א, hê-ḡe): spelled as "Hegai" (Hebrew: הֵגָ֑י) in Esther 2:8, 15; a eunuch in charge of the virgins, while another, named "Shaashgaz" (Esther 2:14), was in charge of the concubines.
- "Their things for purification": or from Hebrew "their ointments"; cf. NIV, CEV, NLT: "beauty treatments."

== Esther's admission to the court (2:5–11) ==
As the requirement to enter the contest is simply her beauty (verse 3), Esther's status of being Jewish, a descendant of captives (verse 6), without father and mother, did not hinder her entrance to the court. Once she was in the harem, she obtained 'a favored position in eyes of the harem-master'.

=== Verse 5 ===
Now in Shushan the palace there was a certain Jew, whose name was Mordecai, the son of Jair, the son of Shimei, the son of Kish, a Benjamite;

- "Mordecai": a name that reflects the name of the Babylonian deity Marduk; a possible common custom of many Jews at that time to have 'two names: one for secular use and the other for use especially within the Jewish community', but there is no record of Mordecai's Jewish name in the biblical text.

=== Verse 6 ===
Who had been carried away from Jerusalem with the captivity which had been carried away with Jeconiah king of Judah, whom Nebuchadnezzar the king of Babylon had carried away.

- "Jeconiah": is an alternative name for Jehoiachin (2 Kings 24:6), although a number of modern English versions use the latter name to avoid confusion (for examples, NIV, NCV, TEV, NLT).

=== Verse 7 ===
And he brought up Hadassah, that is, Esther, his uncle's daughter: for she had neither father nor mother, and the maid was fair and beautiful; whom Mordecai, when her father and mother were dead, took for his own daughter.

- "Brought out" (KJV, ASV, RSV, NIV) or "bringing up" (NASB): from the Hebrew term אֹמֵן (ʾomen) which means:
  - (1) "attendant" of children (Numbers 11:12; Isaiah 49:23);
  - (2) "guardian" (2 Kings 10:1, 5; Esther 2:7);
  - (3) "nurse-maid" (2 Samuel 4:4; Ruth 4:16);
  - (4) "to look after" (Isaiah 60:4; Lamentations 4:5).
- "Hadassah": is a Jewish name that may mean "myrtle"; the name Esther could be derived from the Persian word for "star," or the name of the Babylonian goddess "Ishtar".
- "For she had neither father nor mother" from Hebrew "for there was not to her father or mother", is 'universally understood to mean Esther's father and mother were no longer alive.'
- "Fair and beautiful": from Hebrew "beautiful of form", where the Hebrew noun תֹּאַר (toʾar, "form; shape") is used to describe 'the physical bodily shape of a beautiful woman' (Genesis 29:17; Deuteronomy 21:11; 1 Samuel 25:3); TEV: "had a good figure."
- "Took for his own daughter": from Hebrew "had taken her to him", where the Hebrew verb לָקַח (laqakh, "to take") describes Mordecai adopting Esther and treating her like his own daughter, "to take as one's own property" as a daughter.

=== Verse 10 ===
Esther had not made known her people or kindred, for Mordecai had commanded her not to make it known.

- "Made known": or "disclosed" (MEV; NET Bible); "revealed the identity of" (NKJV). Esther was able so effectively to conceal her Jewish heritage suggests that she was not consistently observing Jewish dietary and religious requirements (in contrast to Daniel).
- "Her people or her kindred": this same phrase occurs but with the word order reversed in Esther 2:20.

== Esther's accession to the throne (2:12–18) ==
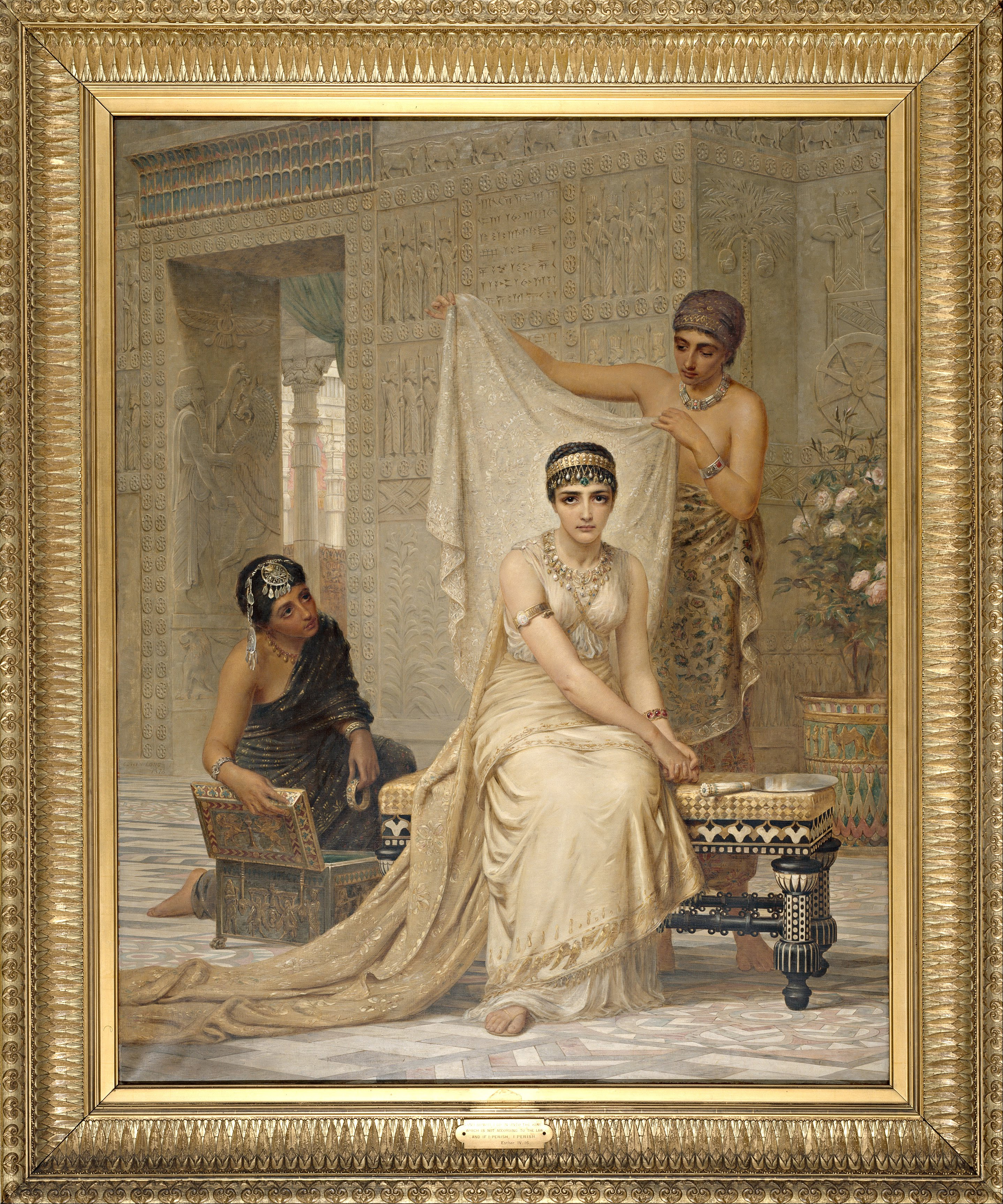
Queen Esther (1879) by Edwin Long.

This part contains the description of the twelve-month course of beautifying treatments for the candidates of the Persian queen. It also gives a hint of Esther's character: she might possess 'innate cunning' to distinguish herself from her competitors and at the end was chosen to be the queen.

=== Verse 12 ===
Now when every maid's turn was come to go in to king Ahasuerus, after that she had been twelve months, according to the manner of the women, (for so were the days of their purifications accomplished, to wit, six months with oil of myrrh, and six months with sweet odours, and with other things for the purifying of the women;)

- "According to the manner of the women": from Hebrew "to be to her according to the law of the women"; NASB "under the regulations for the women."

=== Verse 16 ===
So Esther was taken unto king Ahasuerus into his house royal in the tenth month, which is the month Tebeth, in the seventh year of his reign.

The time referred to in the verse falls in the January or February of 478 BC which would have been very shortly after Xerxes' return to Susa from the war with the Greeks, thus the long delay in replacing Vashti can be explained by the long absence of Xerxes in Greece.

== Mordecai's discovery of the plot against the king (2:19–23) ==
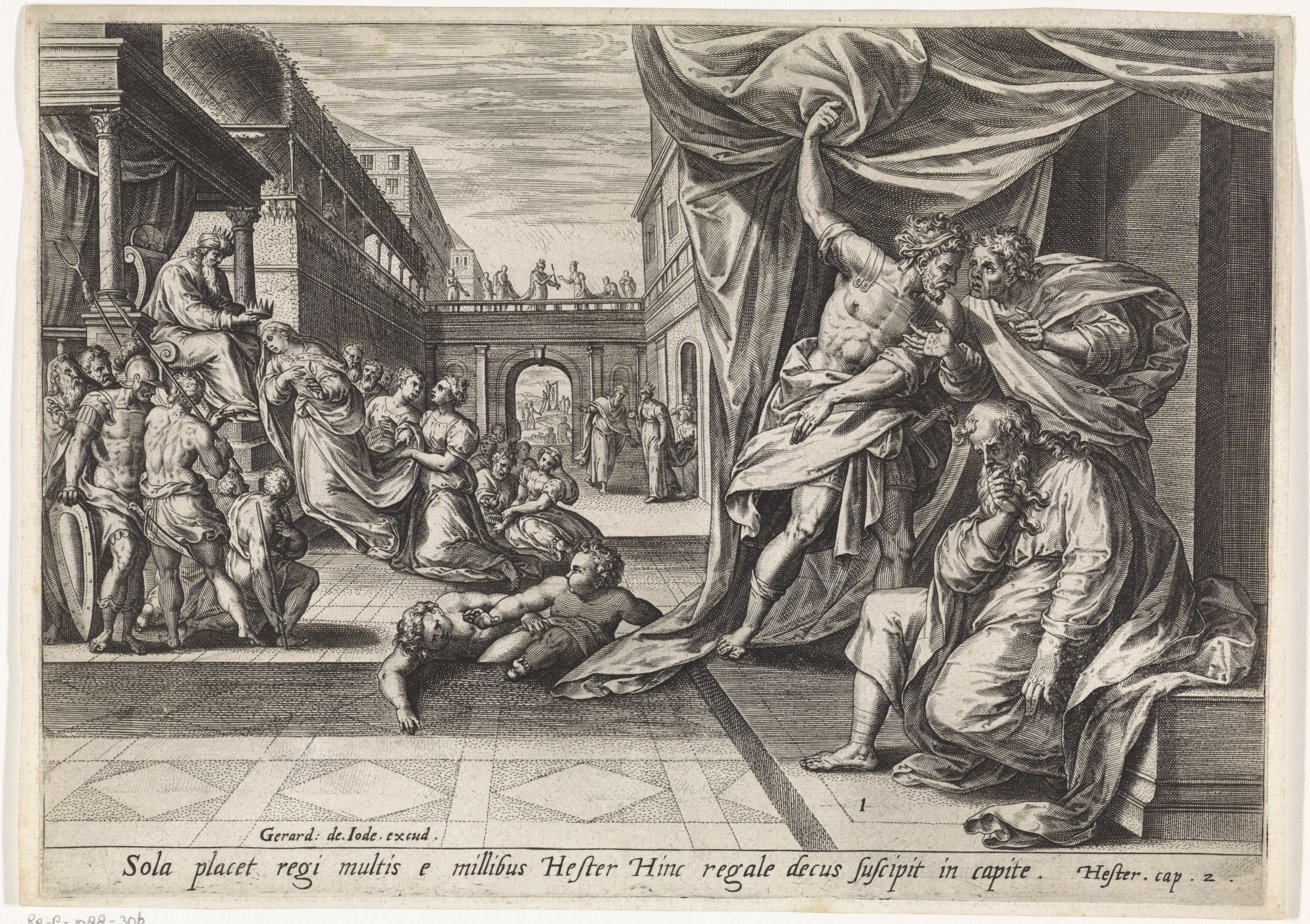
The crowning of Esther (left) with Mordecai at the gate, listening to Bigthan and Teresh conspiring against the king (right). Gerard de Jode, 1579.

This section records how Mordecai overheard a plot to assassinate the king and told Esther, so she could save the king's life based on the information "in the name of Mordecai" (verse 22). This episode foreshadows the future events and becomes truly functional with the rewarding of Mordecai in chapter 6.

=== Verse 20 ===
Esther had not made known her kindred or her people, as Mordecai had commanded her, for Esther obeyed Mordecai just as when she was brought up by him.

- "Had not made known": Esther was able so effectively to conceal her Jewish heritage suggests that she was not consistently observing Jewish dietary and religious requirements (in contrast to Daniel).
- "Her kindred or her people": this same phrase occurs but with the word order reversed in Esther 2:10.
- "Mordecai had commanded her": at the end of this phrase, the Greek Septuagint version has the words "to fear God".

=== Verse 21 ===
In those days, as Mordecai was sitting at the king's gate, Bigthan and Teresh, two of the king's eunuchs, who guarded the threshold, became angry and sought to lay hands on King Ahasuerus.

- "Bigthan": referred to as “Bigthana,” a variant spelling of the name, in Esther 6:2.

== See also ==
- Xerxes I
- Susa
- Related Bible parts: Ruth 4, Nehemiah 1, Daniel 6, Daniel 8

== Sources ==
- Clines, David J. A. (1988). "Esther". In Mays, James Luther; Blenkinsopp, Joseph (eds.). Harper's Bible Commentary (illustrated ed.). Harper & Row. pp. 387–394. ISBN 978-0060655419.
- Crawford, Sidnie White (2003). "Esther". In Dunn, James D. G.; Rogerson, John William (eds.). Eerdmans Commentary on the Bible (illustrated ed.). Wm. B. Eerdmans Publishing. pp. 329–336. ISBN 978-0802837110.
- Halley, Henry H. (1965). Halley's Bible Handbook: an abbreviated Bible commentary (24th (revised) ed.). Zondervan Publishing House. ISBN 0-310-25720-4.
- Larson, Knute; Dahlen, Kathy; Anders, Max E. (2005). Anders, Max E. (ed.). Holman Old Testament Commentary - Ezra, Nehemiah, Esther. Holman Old Testament commentary. Vol. 9 (illustrated ed.). B&H Publishing Group. ISBN 978-0805494693.
- Meyers, Carol (2007). "16. Esther". In Barton, John; Muddiman, John (eds.). The Oxford Bible Commentary (first (paperback) ed.). Oxford University Press. pp. 324–330. ISBN 978-0199277186.
- Moore, Carey A. (Sep–Dec 1975). "Archaeology and the Book of Esther". The Biblical Archaeologist. 38 (3/4): 62–79. doi:10.2307/3209587. JSTOR 3209587. S2CID 166110735.
- Smith, Gary (2018). Ezra, Nehemiah, Esther. Cornerstone Biblical Commentary. Vol. 5. Tyndale House. ISBN 978-1414399126.
- Turner, L. A. (2013). Desperately Seeking YHWH: Finding God in Esther's "Acrostics". Interested Readers. Essays on the Hebrew Bible in Honor of David J. A. Clines, 183–193.
- Würthwein, Ernst (1995). The Text of the Old Testament. Translated by Rhodes, Erroll F. Grand Rapids, MI: Wm. B. Eerdmans. ISBN 0-8028-0788-7.
