= Sidnie White Crawford =

Professor of Classics & Religious Studies

- Born: January 8, 1960 (age 66)

Academic background
- Education: Harvard Divinity School
- Doctoral advisor: Frank Moore Cross

Academic work
- Discipline: Classics; Religious studies
- Institutions: Albright Institute of Archaeological Research; Princeton Theological Seminary; University of Nebraska–Lincoln; St. Olaf College; Albright College
- Main interests: Dead Sea Scrolls

Sidnie White Crawford is professor emerita of Classics and Religious Studies at the University Of Nebraska-Lincoln. She specializes in the Dead Sea Scrolls and Textual Criticism of the Hebrew Bible. She also taught at St. Olaf College and Albright College. She has also been a visiting professor at Boston College.

White Crawford is the board chair of the W. F. Albright Institute of Archaeology in Jerusalem. She was awarded an honorary doctorate at the University of Uppsala in 2018.

== Life ==
=== Education ===
White Crawford has a MTS from Harvard Divinity School (1984) and received a PhD in 1988 from Harvard University for work in the Department of Near Eastern Languages and Civilizations. The supervisor of her dissertation was Frank Moore Cross.

== Ministry ==
White Crawford was ordained to the priesthood in the Episcopal Church in 2005 by Joe Goodwin Burnett. She has served a parish in the Episcopal Diocese of Nebraska beginning in 2011 and Christ Episcopal Church (Stroudsburg, Pennsylvania) until 2025.

== Published works ==
Monographs

- 2008 Rewriting Scripture in Second Temple Times. Grand Rapids: Eerdmans. ISBN 9780802847409
- 2000 The Temple Scroll and Related Texts. Sheffield: Sheffield Academic Press. ISBN 9781283206723 Also in electronic format: Logos Bible Software.

Critical Editions

- 1995 "4QDeuteronomya, c, d, f, g, i, n, o, p" Discoveries in the Judaean Desert XIV, pp. 7–8, 15–38, 45–60, 71–74, 117–136. Oxford at the Clarendon Press.
- 1994 "4QReworked Pentateuch: 4Q364-367, with an appendix on 4Q365a" (with E. Tov), Discoveries in the Judaean Desert XIII, pp. 197–352. Oxford at the Clarendon Press.

Commentaries

- 2013 "Esther (Greek)," in The CEB Study Bible with Apocrypha (Joel B. Green, General Editor), Nashville: Abingdon, 61AP-76AP.
- 2012 "Esther," in The Women's Bible Commentary, Twentieth Anniversary Edition (revised and updated; eds. Carol A. Newsom, Sharon H. Ringe and Jacqueline E. Lapsley), Louisville: Westminster/John Knox, 201–207.
- 2010 "Judith," in New Interpreter's Bible One Volume Commentary (eds. David L. Petersen and Beverly R. Gaventa), Nashville: Abingdon, 547–554.
- 2006 "Esther," "Additions to Esther," in The HarperCollins Study Bible (rev. ed.; ed. Harold Attridge). San Francisco, CA: HarperCollins.
- 2003 "Esther," in Eerdmans Commentary on the Bible, Grand Rapids, MI: Eerdmans, 329–36.
- "Esther," "Additions to Esther," "Judith," in New Interpreter's Study Bible. Nashville, TN: Abingdon.
- 2001 "Jonah" in The HarperCollins Bible Commentary. Ed. by James L. May et al. New York: HarperCollins, pp. 656–659.
- 1999 The Book of Esther. Introduction, Commentary, and Reflections. The New Interpreter's Bible; vol. III, pp. 853–941. Nashville, TN: Abingdon. The Additions to Esther: Introduction, Commentary and Reflections. The New Interpreter's Bible; vol. III, pp. 943–72. Nashville, TN: Abingdon.
- 1998 & 1992 "Esther" in The Woman's Bible Commentary. 1st and 2nd revised edition; eds. Carol Newsom & Sharon Ringe; Louisville, KY: John Knox/Westminster.

Edited Volumes

- 2007 Up to the Gates of Ekron (1 Samuel 17:52): Essays on the Archaeology and History of the Eastern Mediterranean in Honor of Seymour Gitin. Jerusalem: Israel Exploration Society (with Amnon Ben-Tor, J.P. Dessel, William G. Dever, Amihai Mazar, and Joseph Aviram).
- 2003 The Book of Esther in Modern Research. London: T & T Clark (with Leonard J. Greenspoon).
