= James Luther Mays =

American Old Testament scholar

- Born: July 14, 1921; Louisville, Georgia
- Died: October 29, 2015 (aged 94)
- Occupation: Old Testament scholar
- Title: Cyrus McCormick Professor of Hebrew and the Old Testament Emeritus at Union Presbyterian Seminary, Virginia
- Spouse: Mary Will (nee Boyd)
- Children: two daughters

Academic background
- Education: University of Manchester
- Doctoral advisor: H. H. Rowley

Academic work
- Discipline: Biblical studies
- Sub-discipline: Old Testament studies
- Notable works: Psalms, Hosea, Amos, and Micah

James Luther Mays (July 14, 1921 – October 29, 2015) was an American Old Testament scholar. He was Cyrus McCormick Professor of Hebrew and the Old Testament Emeritus at Union Presbyterian Seminary, Virginia. He served as president of the Society of Biblical Literature in 1986.

Mays wrote commentaries on Psalms, Hosea, Amos, and Micah. He was formerly editor of Interpretation.

In 1986, a Festschrift was published in his honor, called The Hermeneutical Quest: Essays in Honor of James Luther Mays on His Sixty-fifth Birthday. It included contributions from Elizabeth Achtemeier, James Barr, Brevard Childs, Patrick D. Miller, James A. Sanders, and Claus Westermann.

== Works ==
=== Books ===
- Mays, James Luther (1960). Exegesis as a theological discipline. Richmond, VA: Union Theological Seminary. OCLC 13948482.
- ——— (1963). Leviticus, Numbers. Layman's Bible book commentary. Vol. 4. London: SCM Press. OCLC 70423288.
- ——— (1969). Amos: a commentary. London: SCM Press. ISBN 9780334000396. OCLC 716616834.
- ——— (1976). Micah : a commentary. Old Testament library. Philadelphia, PA: Westminster Press. ISBN 9780664208172. OCLC 2020740.
- ——— (1978). Ezekiel, Second Isaiah. Proclamation commentaries. Philadelphia, PA: Fortress. ISBN 9780800605926. OCLC 3609030.
- ——— (1985). Interpreting the prophets. Philadelphia, PA: Fortress. ISBN 9780800619329. OCLC 917385441.
- ——— (1981). Interpreting the gospels. Philadelphia, PA: Fortress. ISBN 9780800614393. OCLC 869057632.
- ———; Blenkinsopp, Joseph, eds. (1988). Harper's Bible Commentary. San Francisco & Cambridge: Harper & Row. ISBN 9780060655419. OCLC 715645920.
- ——— (1994). The Lord reigns: a theological handbook to the Psalms. Louisville, KY: Westminster John Knox Press. ISBN 9780664255589. OCLC 30109597.
- ———; Petersen, David L.; Richards, Kent Harold, eds. (1995). Old Testament interpretation: past, present, and future: essays in honor of Gene M. Tucker. Nashville, TN: Abingdon Press. ISBN 9780687138715. OCLC 1021306503.
- ——— (2006). Preaching and teaching the Psalms. Louisville, KY: Westminster John Knox Press. ISBN 9780664230418. OCLC 62085497.
- ——— (2011). Psalms. Interpretation, a Bible commentary for teaching and preaching. Louisville: John Knox Press. ISBN 9780664234393. OCLC 820555500.

== Festschriften ==
- Miller, Donald G., ed. (1986). The Hermeneutical Quest: Essays in Honor of James Luther Mays on His Sixty-fifth Birthday. Princeton theological monograph series. Vol. 4. Allison Park, PA: Pickwick Publications. ISBN 9780915138869. OCLC 13124684.
