= Joseph Blenkinsopp =

American scholar (1927–2022)

- Born: 3 April 1927; Durham, England
- Died: 26 March 2022 (aged 94); South Bend, Indiana, U.S.
- Spouse: Jean Porter

Academic background
- Education: University of London; Pontifical Biblical Institute; University of Oxford
- Thesis: Gibeon and the Gibeonites from the Settlement to Solomon (1967)

Academic work
- Discipline: Theology
- Sub-discipline: Old Testament
- School or tradition: Roman Catholicism
- Institutions: University of Notre Dame
- Notable works: The Pentateuch

Joseph Blenkinsopp (3 April 1927 – 26 March 2022) was an academic theologian and Old Testament scholar. He was the John A. O'Brien Professor Emeritus of Biblical Studies in the Department of Theology at the University of Notre Dame. His research focused on the Old Testament Prophets and on the Pentateuch.

== Life ==
Blenkinsopp studied history at the University of London (Honours B.A.). He then earned an S.S.L. (Licentiate in Sacred Scripture) from the Pontifical Biblical Institute in 1958 and his doctorate in Hebrew Bible and Semitics from the University of Oxford in 1967. Blenkinsopp taught at Heythrop College, London (1966); Vanderbilt University (1968); Chicago Theological Seminary (1968–69); and Hartford Seminary Foundation (1969-70) before coming to the University of Notre Dame in 1970. He was rector at Tantur Ecumenical Institute in Bethlehem for the year 1978, and was a guest professor at the Pontifical Biblical Institute in Rome in 1997-1998.

Blenkinsopp served as president of the Catholic Biblical Association of America (1988-1989) and as president of the Society for the Study of the Old Testament (1999-2000). He has also been the recipient of National Endowment for the Humanities and Mellon grants.

Blenkinsopp died on 26 March 2022, aged 94, in South Bend, Indiana.

== Work ==
Blenkinsopp published a number of standard commentaries and introductions on parts of the Old Testament, particularly on the Prophets, the Pentateuch, and Ezra–Nehemiah.

Select publications are:

- Isaiah 1-39: A New Translation with Introduction and Commentary (Anchor Bible; New York)
- Isaiah 40-55. A New Translation with Introduction and Commentary (Anchor Bible; New York)
- Isaiah 56-66. A New Translation with Introduction and Commentary (Anchor Bible; New York)
- The Pentateuch: An Introduction to the First Five Books of the Bible (Anchor Bible Reference Library; New York)
- Ezra-Nehemiah: A Commentary (Old Testament Library; Louisville, Ky.)
- The History of Prophecy in Israel (Louisville, Ky.)
- Creation, De-Creation, Re-Creation: A Discursive Commentary on Genesis 1-11. London & New York: T&T Clark, 2011 ISBN 978-0-567-37287-1
- Abraham: The Story of a Life. Wm. B. Eerdmans Publishing, 2015 ISBN 978-0-8028-7287-6
