= One Night with the King =

- Theatrical release poster
- Directed by: Michael O. Sajbel
- Screenplay by: Stephan Blinn
- Based on: Hadassah: One Night with the King by Tommy Tenney and Mark Andrew Olsen
- Produced by: Stephan Blinn; Richard J. Cook; Laurie Crouch; Matthew Crouch; Lawrence Mortorff
- Starring: Tiffany Dupont; Luke Goss; John Rhys-Davies; John Noble; Tommy "Tiny" Lister; James Callis; Jonah Lotan; Peter O'Toole; Omar Sharif
- Cinematography: Steven Bernstein
- Edited by: Gabriella Cristiani; Stephan Blinn
- Music by: J. A. C. Redford
- Production company: Gener8Xion Entertainment
- Distributed by: 8x Entertainment
- Release date: October 13, 2006
- Running time: 123 minutes
- Country: United States
- Language: English
- Budget: $20 million
- Box office: $13.7 million

One Night with the King is a 2006 American epic film produced by Matt Crouch and Laurie Crouch of Gener8Xion Entertainment, directed by Michael O. Sajbel, and starring Peter O'Toole, Tiffany Dupont, John Rhys-Davies, and Luke Goss.

The screenplay by Stephan Blinn is based on Tommy Tenney and Mark Andrew Olsen's novel Hadassah: One Night with the King. One Night with the King is a dramatization of the Biblical story of Esther, who risked her life by approaching the King of Persia to request that he save the Jewish people. It received a 2007 CAMIE Award for Goss' portrayal of King Xerxes.

== Plot ==
The film begins with a prologue—500 years before the main story, depicting the time when King Saul of the Israelites was sent by Prophet Samuel to wipe out the Amalekites who practiced cruel religious practices. King Agag and his queen were captured and brought before King Saul. However, Saul disobeyed God's command by sparing Agag's life and keeping the best livestock. When the prophet discovers this act of disobedience, he rebuked Saul for his arrogance and executed King Agag on the spot. Matters got worse when the Israelites realized that Agag's queen escaped and was pregnant. Carrying an unborn child of the slain king, the queen struggled through the dessert, yet the seed of vengeance grew within her. Eventually, she was rescued by a nomadic tribe, ensuring the survival of the Amalekite royal bloodline.

Generations later, this unbroken lineage leads directly to Haman the Agagite (term for 'descendant of Agag). He inherits his ancestor's bitter hatred and uses his power in the Persian Empire to plot the total annihilation of the Jewish people.

The main narrative is set in Susa, Persia (modern-day Iran). King Xerxes holds a great feast for all the people to attend. An orphaned Jewish woman, Hadassah, longs to go to Jerusalem to see the Holy Land and secretly prepares to leave with the caravan along with her friend, Jesse. They stop by the king's feast before he goes marching to war to avenge his father's death. Hadassah and Jesse witness the king summoning Queen Vashti. Queen Vashti was opposed to the war, desiring King Xerxes to enhance his kingdom instead. She holds her own feast in protest against the war.

Meanwhile—with the goal to manipulate and overthrow King Xerxes—the treacherous Prince Admatha advocates heavily for the upcoming military campaign against Greece. He aligns with Haman and pays him to speak of him to their monarch. When the king summons Queen Vashti to his feast, she refuses to come, stating, "I am queen and I will not lower my dignity. Or shame my crown by wearing it before your drunk and thinly veiled war council". Because of this, the king is advised to banish her and select a more worthy queen.

All beautiful unmarried women in the city of Susa are brought to Xerxes. Under the command of her overprotective cousin, Mordecai, Hadassah does not reveal her nationality or family and changes her name to "Esther" (after the Babylonian goddess Ishtar). Eventually she is taken in with the rest of the selected women and given cosmetics, perfumes and treatments under the care of Hegai, the king's royal eunuch. Through her quick wit, intelligence and integrity, she becomes Hegai's favorite.

On their night with the king, each female candidate is allowed to bring along whatever she wishes from the harem. She goes in the evening and returns in the morning to a second harem. She will not be able to return to the king unless she pleases him and he summons her by name. During their preparation, Hegai discovers that Esther can read and listens to her reading to the other contenders. He admires her bravery. Late into the night, he brings her to King Xerxes to read to him. She starts reading from the assigned scroll and then begins telling the love story of Jacob and Rachel (from the Old Testament). The king is amused and intrigued and dismisses her, saying that she shall read to him again. Esther falls in love with the king. When it is Esther's turn for her "one night with the king", she only wears what Hegai advises. She wins the king's favor by revealing her heart to him. He chooses her and crowns her queen.

After Xerxes and his loyal statesman Prince Memucan leave for war, Prince Admatha abandons his political schemes and decides to use force. He turns to his eunuchs who know of poison and aligns himself with Haman, laying the groundwork for a coup. However, Mordecai learns his plot outside of the palace and alerts Queen Esther. As Admatha denies these acts of treachery, this gives Haman the advantage to play both sides. In secret, he kills the eunuchs, takes their poison, and lies to Esther that he interrogated the eunuchs who "must've worked alone." Unable to sleep, Esther and Hegai leave the palace discreetly and discover Haman's secret gatherings where he routinely delivers nationalistic speeches to stoke deep-seated hatred against the Jewish.

Later on, King Xerxes and Esther's happiness is short-lived after he misunderstands that Esther has been unfaithful to him when he sees her with Mordecai. Because of this, Xerxes stops summoning Esther and yet doesn't choose to summon concubines. Ups and downs occur; they both yearn for each other and yet are unable to communicate.

After many days of torture, Admatha finally confesses all and is dealt with. Due to court politics, Haman takes the credit of uncovering the conspiracy, keeping King Xerxes from knowing that it was actually Mordecai, his Jewish scribe, who squelched the threat. Then, Haman is promoted to the highest-ranking official. He has all the king's servants at the royal gate kneel before him.

Mordecai refuses, declaring that he will only kneel before God and the king. He announces himself before Haman to be a son of Abraham, a Jew. Haman, filled with vengeance and hatred, seeks to destroy Mordecai and all his people because generations earlier, Jews persecuted his forefathers. Due to Xerxes' loyalty to his late father, Haman lies to Xerxes that killing the Jews would be the "only way to ensure they don't rise up and seek revenge." Memucan disagrees with the act of violence, but unfortunately fails to change the king's mind. Memucan turns to Esther who learns of Haman's plot towards her people.

After Esther reveals it was Mordecai who saved his life, King Xerxes summons Haman to advise how to reward the man who has rendered great service to him. Arrogantly assuming the king is referring to him, Haman proudly suggests the man to be dressed in the king's royal robe and led on horseback through the city streets by one of the empire's most noble princes. Xerxes enthusiastically agrees to the idea, sealing Haman's humiliation by ordering him to personally lead Mordecai through the city and proclaim his honor to the entire public.

With Haman's plot drawing near, Jesse warns Esther that her time is running out since the king will leave for Greece soon. She follows Mordecai's advice to break protocol by going before the king unsummoned, risking her life to plead for her people. The king spares her life out of his love for her. She invites the king and Haman to a banquet and there reveals her nationality and Haman's plot to kill the Jews. The king, overwhelmed by her revelation, leaves the banquet. Haman then attacks Esther. The king saves her and commands Haman be hanged on the gallows he had erected to hang Mordecai. After Haman is taken away for his execution, the king goes to Esther's side. Esther asks, "What made you come back"? And the king responds with, "I saw the stars". Then King Xerxes happily kisses Esther under the moonlight.

Mordecai is made a prince of Persia and issues a royal decree in his own name, with flashbacks of Esther being made queen and the crowd of Jews cheering in the streets. Mordecai proclaims, "I order this decree sent out under the great seal of Mordecai, Prince of Persia, a Jew".

== Modification ==
The film generally adheres to the main plot of the Biblical version. However, the film adds stylistic elements not present in the Biblical story, as well as depicting several non-Biblical minor characters.

== Production and sales ==
The movie's Premiere Night took place at Mann Bruins Theater in Los Angeles, California. The movie, filmed entirely in the state of Rajasthan, India, was released in theaters on October 13, 2006. During its opening weekend, it earned $4,120,497 in theaters. By the end of its theatrical run, the film had earned $13,395,961 domestically, and $13,728,450 worldwide.

== Cast ==
- Tiffany Dupont as Hadassah/Esther, the main protagonist. The orphaned future queen and cousin of Mordecai. Esther's parents died prior to the start of the film.
- Luke Goss as King Xerxes I of Persia, Esther's husband; who is insecure in his new position as king.
- John Rhys-Davies as Mordecai, Esther's overprotective cousin and father-figure. Esther's nickname for Mordecai is Uncle Mordecai. Moredcai took Esther in after her parents died.
- Omar Sharif as Prince Memucan, one of the few truly loyal Princes of Persia.
- Tommy Lister, Jr. as Hegai, the Royal Eunuch, the harem's bodyguard.
- Jonah Lotan as Jesse/Hatach, Esther's close friend who becomes a Eunuch in the Persian palace.
- John Noble as Prince Admatha, a scheming prince who plots to become king himself.
- James Callis as Haman, the Agagite, the film's main antagonist, Haman tries to use his position to kill the Jewish inhabitants of Persia. Scenes including Haman and his followers in the film make use of imagery associated with Nazism, including swastika-like symbols and torchlit nighttime rallies.
- Peter O'Toole as Prophet Samuel
- Denzil Smith as Prince Carshena
- Jyoti Dogra as Queen of Persia Vashti
- Tom Alter as King Saul of Israel
- Aditya Bal as Amalekite King Agag
- Tarina Patel as Hannah
- Nimrat Kaur as Sarah
- Asif Basra in a cameo role

== Production ==
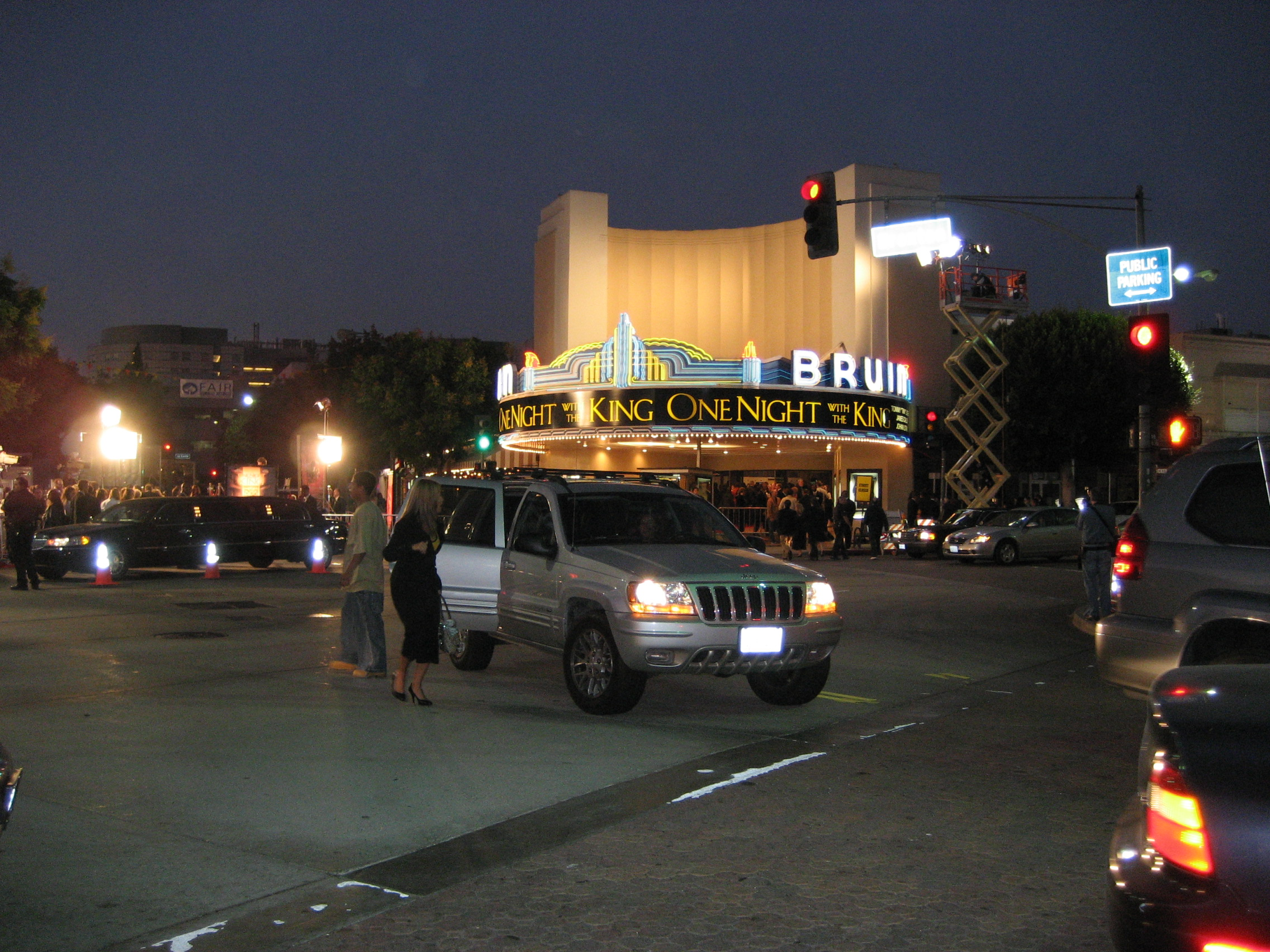
Premiere Night at Mann Bruins Theater in L.A. California

The movie was filmed entirely in the state of Rajasthan, India.

Jeannie Tenney wrote and sang "One Night with the King", which can be heard during the final credits. She was a co-author with her husband, Tommy Tenney (also a producer of the film), of the book upon which the film is based.

=== Promotion ===
The Genius Club from writer/director Tim Chey was also released theatrically in 2006.

== Reception ==
=== Box office ===
One Night with the King was released to theaters on October 13, 2006. During its opening weekend, it earned $4,120,497 in theaters. By the end of its theatrical run, the film had received $13,395,961 domestically, with $13,728,450 worldwide. Subsequent DVD sales were strong at $20,688,299, more than making up for production costs.

=== Critical response ===
One Night with the King received a mixed reception, garnering a 78% score with audiences (25,000+) on Rotten Tomatoes, but only 17% positive rating among critics (24 reviews). It's critical consensus reads: "Despite its epic source matierial, One Night With the King is held back by dull storytelling and a clumsy script".

Variety praised it as "Blessed with abundant production values and a minimum of campy excess, 'One Night with the King' is a surprisingly satisfying attempt to revive the Old Hollywood tradition of lavishly appointed Biblical epics aimed at mainstream auds [sic]."

Roger Moore of the Tribune New Service also praised the film, comparing the visuals as aspiring to the heights of Lord of the Rings on a fraction of the budget: "Filmed at an Indian castle, with digital vistas added to re-create the ancient capital Persepolis, this movie reaches for the scale of “Lord of the Rings” or “The Chronicles of Narnia” at a fraction of the cost. It doesn’t quite get there. But the filmmakers have done justice to a tale that is tribal history, not a supernatural myth. Esther’s triumph isn’t due to divine intervention. It’s her humanity and bravery that make her a legend, and make that “One Night” worth remembering, 2,500 years later."

V.A. Musetto of the New York Post similarly praised the visuals, but criticized the pacing of the story, "The cinematography and sets look great, but the script is a bummer. It's overlong, overwrought and overblown."

MovieGuide gave it 3 out of 4 stars, stating "One Night with the King is impressive for many reasons. The most apparent is that it has big production values with good-looking sets and crowd scenes on a moderate budget. Secondly, it is a well-told story even if it is slightly too long and has a few, very minor plot problems."

=== Accolades ===
One Night with the King was the recipient of a 2007 CAMIE award.

The film was awarded four Doves by the Dove Foundation and received the Dove Family-Approved Seal.

== Classification ==
The British Board of Film Classification granted this motion picture a PG certificate, noting that it contained "images of moderate battle violence".

In the US, One Night with the King is rated PG by the MPAA for violence, some sensuality and thematic elements.

== See also ==
- Esther and the King (1960 film)
- Esther (1999 film)
- The Book of Esther (2013 film)
- List of historical drama films
- Book of Esther
- Esther
