= Esther and Ahasuerus Coffer =

Painting by Jacopo da Sellaio

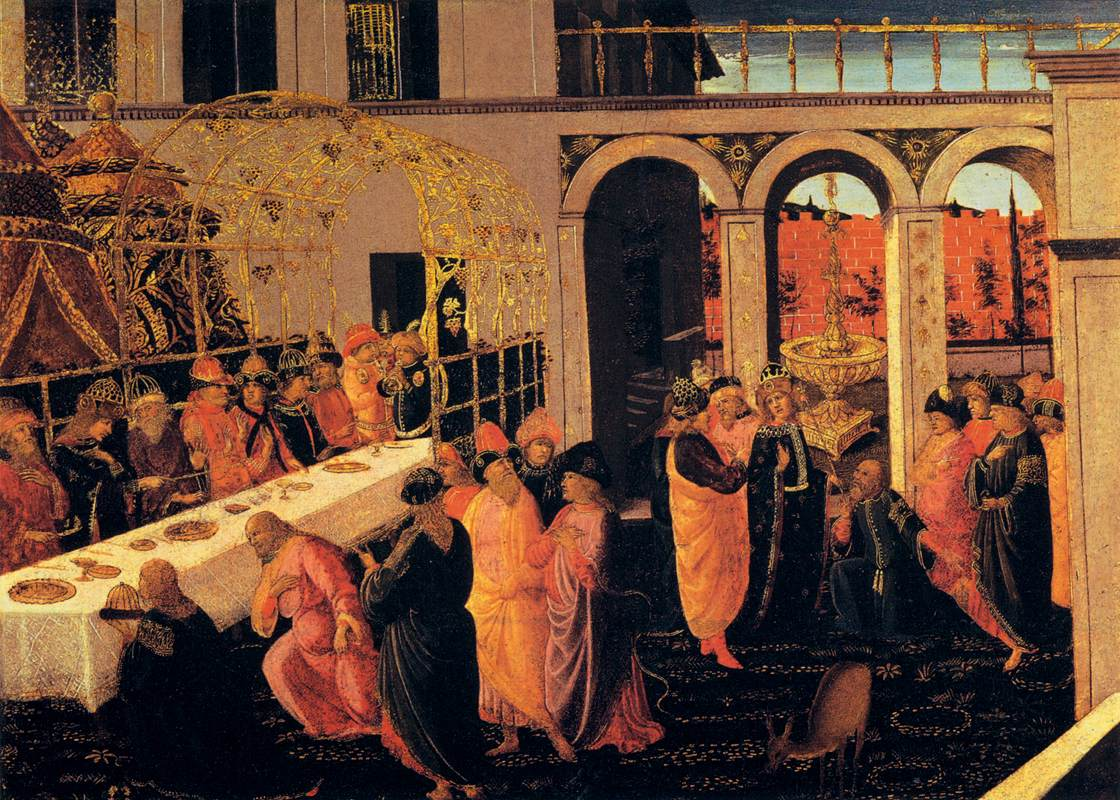

The Esther and Ahasuerus Coffer is a group of five c.1490 tempera on panel paintings of scenes by Jacopo del Sellaio, whose studio specialised in the production of such coffers and cassoni. Influenced by Bartolomeo di Giovanni, another painter of cassoni and coffers, three panels are now in the Uffizi in Florence. Two other panels are in the collection of the Louvre and the Museum of Fine Arts, Budapest.

Cassoni were a Florentine speciality at the time, combining carpentry, painting, stucco and sculpture. The three panels' rich architectural background is influenced by the work of Domenico Ghirlandaio. All three scenes (Death of Queen Vashti, Banquet of Ahasuerus and Triumph of Mordecai) derive from the Book of Esther. It was probably produced for a wedding given its allusions to the theme of fidelity, with Vashti as a cautionary exemplar of a disobedient wife.

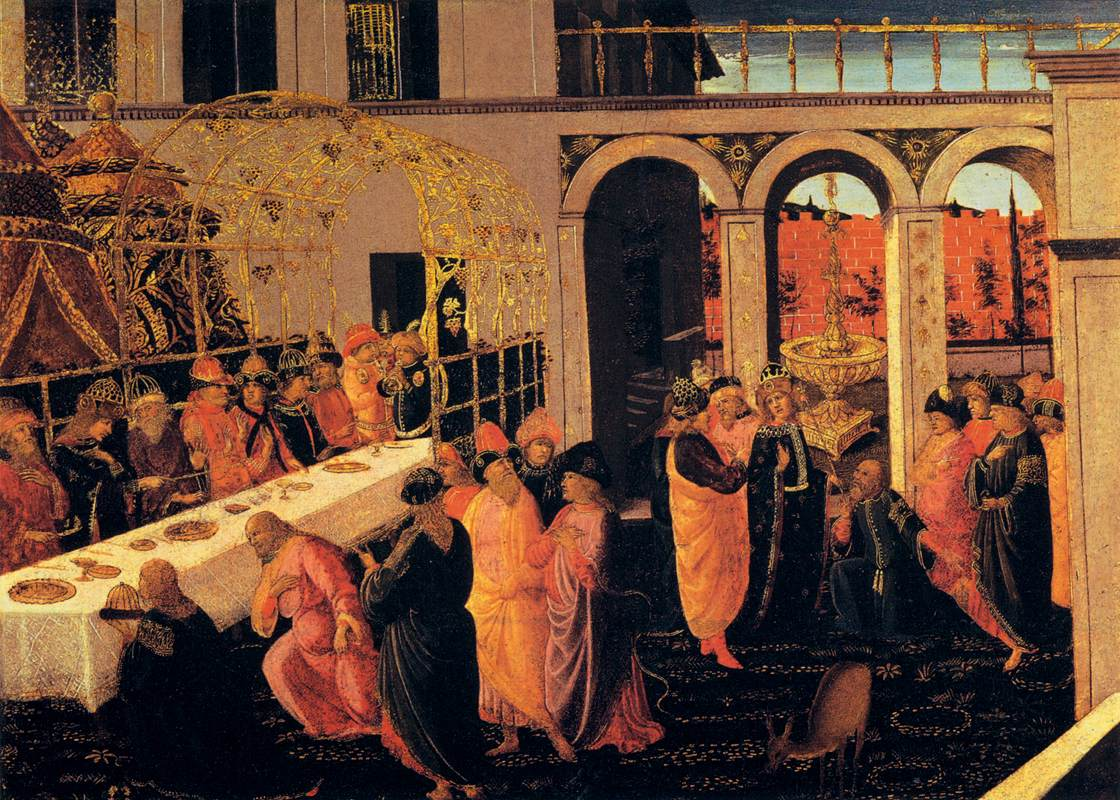
Banquet of Ahasuerus

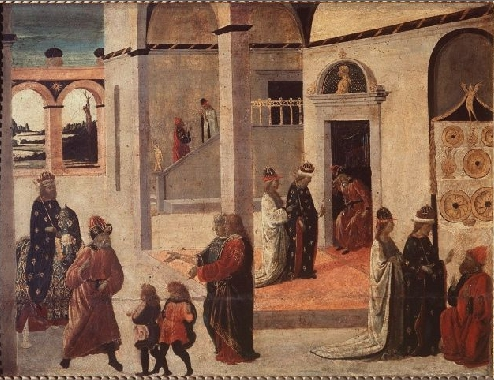
Triumph of Mordechai

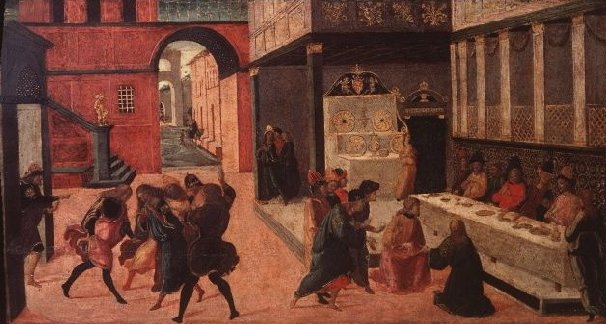
Death of Queen Vashti
