= Esther 3 =

Chapter in the Book of Esther

- ← chapter 2 chapter 4 →
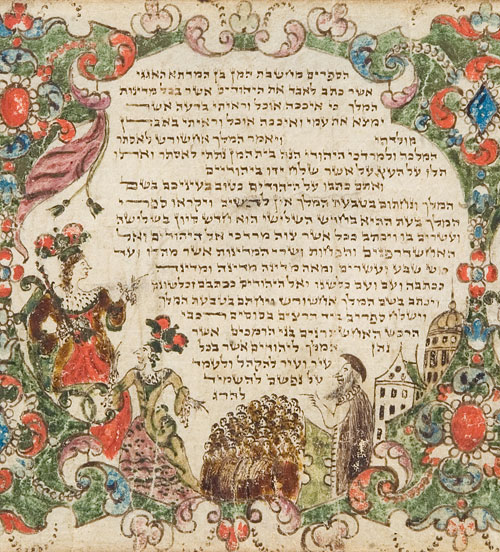
- An intricately illustrated early 18th-century manuscript scroll of the Book of Esther.
- Book: Book of Esther
- Category: Ketuvim
- Christian Bible part: Old Testament
- Order in the Christian part: 17

Esther 3 is the third chapter of the Book of Esther in the Hebrew Bible or the Old Testament of the Christian Bible. The author of the book is unknown and modern scholars have established that the final stage of the Hebrew text would have been formed by the second century BCE. Chapters 3 to 8 contain the nine scenes that form the complication in the book. This chapter introduces Haman the Agagite, who is linked by his genealogy to King Agag, the enemy of Israel's King Saul, from whose father, Kish, Mordecai was descended (Esther 2:5–6). The king Ahasuerus elevated Haman to a high position in the court, and ordered everyone to bow down to him, but Mordecai refuses to do so to Haman (3:2), which is connected to Mordecai's Jewish identity (as Jews would only bow down to worship their own God (cf. Daniel 3); this indirectly introduced the religious dimension of the story. Haman reacted by a vast plan to destroy not simply Mordecai, but his entire people (3:8), getting the approval from the king to arrange for a particular date of genocide, selected by casting a lot, or pur (one reason for the festival of Purim; Esther 9:24–26) to fall on the thirteenth day of the twelfth month, Adar (3:7, 13). The chapter ends with the confused reaction of the whole city of Susa due to the decree (verse 15).

== Text ==
This chapter was originally written in the Hebrew language and since the 16th century is divided into 15 verses.

=== Textual witnesses ===
Some early manuscripts containing the text of this chapter in Hebrew are of the Masoretic Text, which includes Codex Leningradensis (1008). (Note: Since 1947 the current text of Aleppo Codex is missing the whole book of Esther.)

There is also a translation into Koine Greek known as the Septuagint, made in the last few centuries BCE. Extant ancient manuscripts of the Septuagint version include Codex Vaticanus (B; $\mathfrak{G}$^{B}; 4th century), Codex Sinaiticus (S; BHK: $\mathfrak{G}$^{S}; 4th century), and Codex Alexandrinus (A; $\mathfrak{G}$^{A}; 5th century).

== Haman's promotion and Mordecai's refusal to honor him (3:1–6) ==
Shifting the focus from Esther and Mordecai, this section describes Haman the Agagite which would be "the enemy of the Jews". Haman's displeasure of Mordecai's refusal to bow down to him turns into an evil design to wipe out the whole people of Mordecai.

=== Verse 1 ===
After these things did king Ahasuerus promote Haman the son of Hammedatha the Agagite, and advanced him, and set his seat above all the princes that were with him.

- "Did... promote": or from Hebrew "made great"; NAB "raised...to high rank"; NIV "honored." The promotion of Haman here has a striking irony to the contribution of Mordecai to saving the king's life (recorded in 2:19–23), which goes unnoticed.

=== Verse 4 ===
Now it came to pass, when they spake daily unto him, and he hearkened not unto them, that they told Haman, to see whether Mordecai's matters would stand: for he had told them that he was a Jew.

- "Mordecai": a name that reflects the name of the Babylonian deity Marduk; a possible common custom of many Jews at that time to have 'two names: one for secular use and the other for use especially within the Jewish community', but there is no record of Mordecai's Jewish name in the biblical text.

=== Verse 6 ===
But he disdained to lay hands on Mordecai alone. So, as they had made known to him the people of Mordecai, Haman sought to destroy all the Jews, the people of Mordecai, throughout the whole kingdom of Ahasuerus.

- "Disdained": Hebrew: "disdained in his eyes".
- "Destroy": or "annihilate".

== Haman's plot against the Jews gains the king's consent (3:7–15) ==
Haman carried out his design by first casting lots to choose the suitable day for execution and then persuading the king to issue a decree to assure the implementation of it.

=== Verse 7 ===
In the first month, that is, the month Nisan, in the twelfth year of king Ahasuerus, they cast Pur, that is, the lot, before Haman from day to day, and from month to month, to the twelfth month, that is, the month Adar.

- "The twelfth year of king Ahasuerus": This year refers to ca. 474 BC.
- "Pur": The term פּוּר (pur, "lot") is an Akkadian loanword, so the narrator explains it in Hebrew ("that is, the lot"). The plural form of this word (i.e., Purim) later refers to the festival celebrating the deliverance of the Jews (cf. Esther 9:24, 26, 28, 31). The Greek historian Herodotus attested the casting of lots to determine a suitable day for carrying out a task by an astrologer among the Persians.

=== Verse 9 ===
[Haman said:] "If it please the king, let it be decreed that they be destroyed, and I will pay 10,000 talents of silver into the hands of those who have charge of the king's business, that they may put it into the king's treasuries."

- "Talent": Each was about 75 pounds or 34 kilograms. By comparing the value of 10,000 talents of silver to the annual income of the Persian empire, which according to Herodotus (Histories 3.95) was "14,500 Euboic talents", it seems that Haman is offering the king a bribe equal to two-thirds of the royal income. Doubtless this huge sum of money would come from the anticipated confiscation of Jewish property and assets once the Jews had been annihilated. The mentioned large sum of money may indicate 'something of the economic standing of the Jewish population in the empire of King Ahasuerus'.

=== Verse 12 ===
Then the king's scribes were summoned on the thirteenth day of the first month, and a decree was written just as Haman had commanded to the king's satraps and to the governors over each province and to the officials of all peoples and to every province according to its own script, and to every people in their language. It was written in the name of King Ahasuerus and sealed with the king's signet ring.

- "The first month": refers to the month Nisan of the Hebrew lunar calendar (cf. Esther 3:7; usually around March–April in Gregorian calendar).

=== Verse 13 ===
And the letters were sent by couriers into all the king's provinces, to destroy, to kill, and to annihilate all the Jews, both young and old, little children and women, in one day, on the thirteenth day of the twelfth month, which is the month of Adar, and to plunder their possessions.

This first edict can be compared and contrasted to the second one as recorded in Esther 8:11:

Esther 3:13	Esther 8:11
First edict	Second edict
Order to to destroy, kill, and annihilate	Permission to to destroy, kill, and annihilate
Undisguised aggression	Self-defense
Violence against general Jewish population	Violence in response to "any armed force ...that might attack" the Jewish population

=== Verse 15 ===
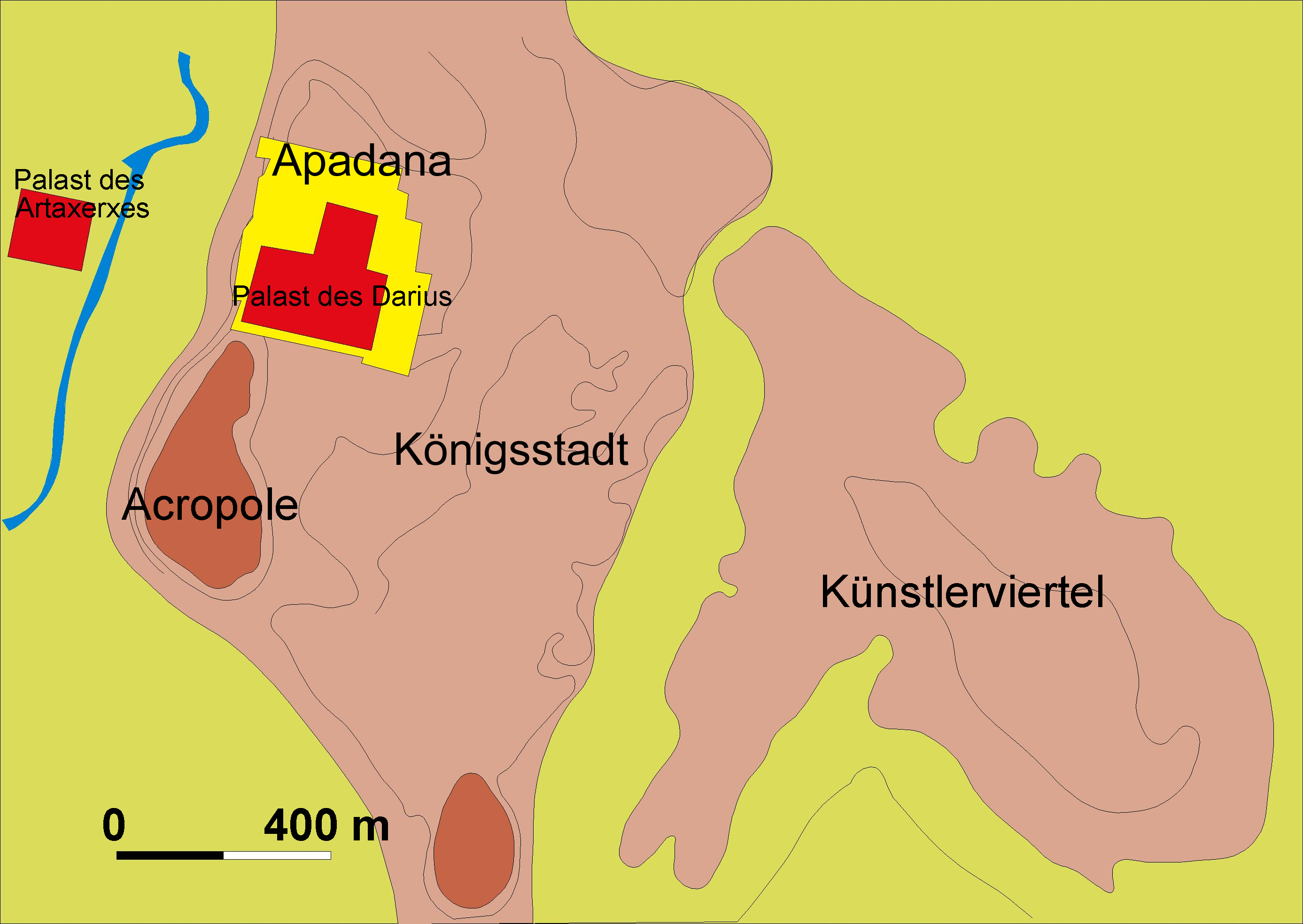
Archaeological map of ancient Susa (Shushan) — now in Khuzestan Province, western Iran – indicating the location of the main palace ("Palast des Darius"; citadel) and the city ("Königsstadt").

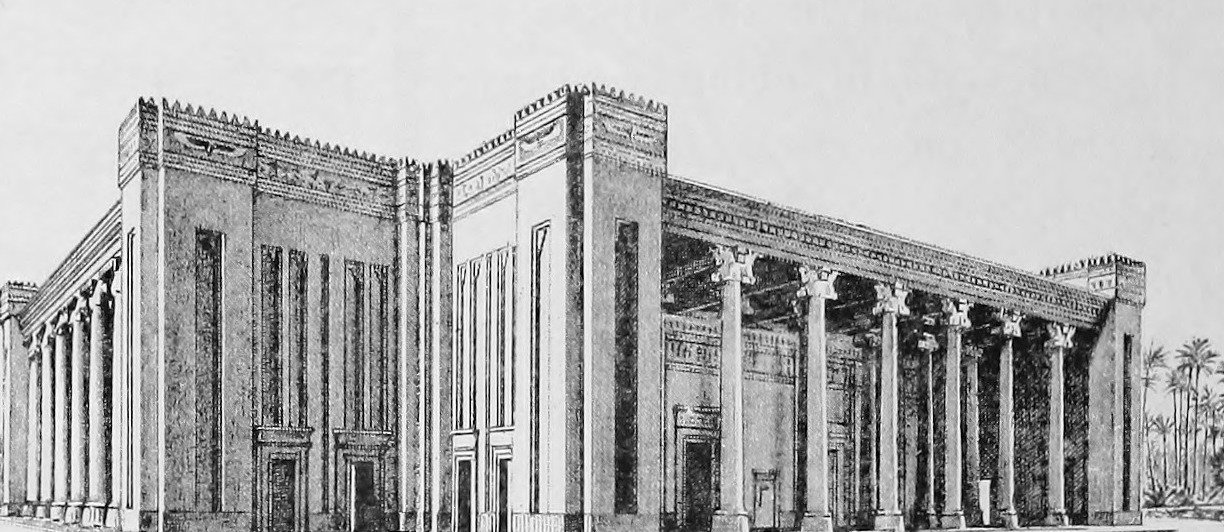
Reconstruction drawing of "Apadana" (the king's palace) in Susa, by Marcel Dieulafoy (1903).

The couriers went out, hastened by the king's command; and the decree was proclaimed in Shushan the citadel. So the king and Haman sat down to drink, but the city of Shushan was perplexed.

- "The couriers": in Hebrew literally "the runners"; also in Esther 8:10, 14.
- "Shushan": or "Susa".
- "Citadel": or "palace". Archaeological works have identified the site of "Shushan the citadel" (the Susa palace) in relation to the site of the "city of Shushan".
- "Perplexed": or "in confusion".

This verse can be compared and contrasted to Esther 8:17:

Bible verse	Esther 3:15	Esther 8:17
After the issue of	First edict	Second edict
Celebration	The king and Haman sat down to drink	The Jews had ... a feast and a good day
Confusion	The city of Susa was in uproar	Many people of the land became Jews

== See also ==
- Agag
- Amalek
- Hebrew calendar
- Xerxes I
- Susa
- Related Bible parts: Daniel 3, Esther 8

== Sources ==
- Bechtel, Carol (1983). Esther. Westminster John Knox Press. ISBN 978-0664237455.
- Clines, David J. A. (1988). "Esther". In Mays, James Luther; Blenkinsopp, Joseph (eds.). Harper's Bible Commentary (illustrated ed.). Harper & Row. pp. 387–394. ISBN 978-0060655419.
- Crawford, Sidnie White (2003). "Esther". In Dunn, James D. G.; Rogerson, John William (eds.). Eerdmans Commentary on the Bible (illustrated ed.). Wm. B. Eerdmans Publishing. pp. 329–336. ISBN 978-0802837110.
- Halley, Henry H. (1965). Halley's Bible Handbook: an abbreviated Bible commentary (24th (revised) ed.). Zondervan Publishing House. ISBN 0-310-25720-4.
- Larson, Knute; Dahlen, Kathy; Anders, Max E. (2005). Anders, Max E. (ed.). Holman Old Testament Commentary - Ezra, Nehemiah, Esther. Holman Old Testament commentary. Vol. 9 (illustrated ed.). B&H Publishing Group. ISBN 978-0805494693.
- Meyers, Carol (2007). "16. Esther". In Barton, John; Muddiman, John (eds.). The Oxford Bible Commentary (first (paperback) ed.). Oxford University Press. pp. 324–330. ISBN 978-0199277186.
- Moore, Carey A. (Sep–Dec 1975). "Archaeology and the Book of Esther". The Biblical Archaeologist. 38 (3/4): 62–79. doi:10.2307/3209587. JSTOR 3209587. S2CID 166110735.
- Smith, Gary (2018). Ezra, Nehemiah, Esther. Cornerstone Biblical Commentary. Vol. 5. Tyndale House. ISBN 978-1414399126.
- Würthwein, Ernst (1995). The Text of the Old Testament. Translated by Rhodes, Erroll F. Grand Rapids, MI: Wm. B. Eerdmans. ISBN 0-8028-0788-7.
