= Memucan =

Biblical figure

According to the biblical book of Esther (Esther 1:14, 1:16-21), Memucan (Hebrew: ממוכן, romanized: Məmūḵān) was one of the seven vice-regents of the Persian King Ahasuerus.

== Biblical account ==
When Queen Vashti, Ahasuerus' consort, refused his order to display herself at the king's banquet, Memucan advised the king to depose her and replace her with a more worthy wife. Memucan further advised the king to issue a decree throughout his domain declaring his action, so that all women would learn a lesson and honor and respect their husbands. The decree was translated and transcribed into each language and script of the empire, so that each man would be "master in his own house."

== Jewish tradition ==
According to the Midrash Abba Gorion, "Memucan" (also written as "Memukhan") was Haman, and his name mentioned "destined for punishment".
