= Swan Esther =

Swan Esther

Swan Esther is a musical based on the Book of Esther.

It was written in 1982 by Jack Edward Oliver (words) and Nick Munns (music).

A professional production was staged by the Young Vic in January 1984. Swan Esther has also been performed by a number of amateur companies.

The original soundtrack was published on CD in May 2014 on the Stage Door record label.
