= Hegai =

Biblical eunuch in the Book of Esther

Hegai (Hebrew: הֵגַי, Greek: Γαι, romanized: Gai, Latin: Egeus) is a character from the Book of Esther, chapter 2, verses 3, 8, 9, and 15. The Masoretic Text also spells his name Hege (Hebrew: הֶגֶא). He is a eunuch placed in charge of Ahasuerus's harem. Chapters 9 and 15 state that Hegai treats Esther favorably; by acting on Hegai's advice, Esther makes a good impression when she is presented to Ahasuerus.

And let the king appoint officers in all the provinces of his kingdom, that they may gather together all the fair young virgins unto Shushan the palace, to the house of the women, unto the custody of Hege the king's chamberlain, keeper of the women; ... So it came to pass, when the king's commandment and his decree was heard, and when many maidens were gathered together unto Shushan the palace, to the custody of Hegai, that Esther was brought also unto the king's house, to the custody of Hegai, keeper of the women. And the maiden pleased him, and she obtained kindness of him; and he speedily gave her her things for purification, with such things as belonged to her, and seven maidens, which were meet to be given her, out of the king's house: and he preferred her and her maids unto the best place of the house of the women.....Now when the turn of Esther, the daughter of Abihail the uncle of Mordecai, who had taken her for his daughter, was come to go in unto the king, she required nothing but what Hegai the king's chamberlain, the keeper of the women, appointed. And Esther obtained favour in the sight of all them that looked upon her.

== See also ==
- Haggai
