= Agagite =

Ethnonym used in the Book of Esther

The term Agagite (Hebrew: אגגי, romanized: ʾĂḡāḡî) is used in the Book of Esther as a description of Haman. The term is understood to be an ethnonym although nothing is known with certainty about the people designated by the name.

According to Cheyne and Black, this term is used to label Haman, figuratively, as a "descendant" of Agag, the enemy of Israel and king of the Amalekites. "Haman, as an Amalekite, is opposed to Mordecai, the descendant of Kish (Esth[er] 2:5) ... The meaning is that there is an internecine struggle between the Jews and their enemies, like that between Saul and Agag of old." With this understanding, the Greek translator rendered the term "Macedonian."

A well known Midrashic explanation of the term relates it to King Agag of the Amalekites whereby it is viewed as meaning either a literal descendant of Agag or a symbolic term for an antisemite, due to the Amalekites being a perennial enemy to the Israelites.
