= Tommy Tenney =

American preacher and author (born 1956)

Tommy Tenney (born 1956) is an American preacher and author, known for his message of "God Chasers".

In his book The God Chasers (1998), Tenney relates experiences of being "in the presence of God", including one occasion when a pulpit was purportedly divinely split in two. He teaches that every Christian should pursue an intimate relationship with God, and that supernatural occurrences are an ordinary outcome of the pursuit.

He has written over fifty other books and workbooks, including Hadassah: One Night with the King with Mark Andrew Olsen, which was made into a film titled One Night with the King, in 2006.

He is the CEO of the GodChasers.net which holds offices in Pineville (Alexandria), Louisiana. GodChasers.net operates under its parent of HDE.

== Background ==
According to his biography, "Tommy Tenney is the author of the multimillion-selling The God Chasers series. He also wrote best selling books, GodCatchers, God's Eye View, God's Dream Team, The Ultimate Comeback and Open Heaven. In addition he writes fiction and has been a Hollywood movie producer. He wrote a series on a fictional account of the ancient story of Queen Esther. The first book of the series Hadassah: One Night with the King is the basis of the movie. The onclusion to the series The Hadassah Covenant throws a twist on the ancient story by bringing it into modern day. With a mission to reach Hollywood, Tommy has been able to reach millions of people through the movie One Night with the King. His latest fiction book, The Road Home, involves the Biblical story of Ruth. His latest non-fiction book is Open Heaven: The Secret Power of a Door-Keeper.

Tommy has written over 30 books. His writings have been translated into more than 40 languages and nominated for many awards including the “Gold Medallion Award” and “Retailers Book of the Year”.

Tommy spent 10 years pastoring and has spent over 40 years in itinerant ministry, traveling to more than 50 nations. He typically speaks in over 150 venues each year sharing his heart with many thousands. GodChasers television ministry is seen in over 120 nations on many different networks. His ministry website, www.godchasers.net, is viewed on average by more than one million people per month.

Tommy is passionate about the presence of God and unity in the body. To help others pursue these twin passions, he founded the GodChasers.network, a mission's ministry organized to assist pastors globally and to distribute Tommy's teachings through various media.

Three generations of ministry in his family heritage have given Tommy a rich perspective. He has a gifting to lead hungry people into the presence of God. He and his wife, Jeannie, understand the value of intimacy with God and humility in serving God's people."

Tenney and his wife, Jeannie, reside in Louisiana. Tenney was raised in a Oneness Pentecostal denomination, the United Pentecostal Church International. His father, Rev. Tom F. Tenney (December 6, 1933 – June 1, 2018), held the position of District Superintendent of the Louisiana District United Pentecostal Church, since 1978. He held this position for 27 years until his recent retirement and re-launch into full-time mobile ministry. J. Lee Grady reported that Tommy Tenney's exit in 1992 was difficult because his father is so prominent in the denomination. Tommy Tenney says that when he left the UPC, his eyes were opened to "how big the body of Christ really is."

== Partial bibliography ==
- Chasing God, Serving Man (Paperback - September 1, 2005)
- Daily Chase: In Hot Pursuit of His Presence (Paperback - February 1, 2002)
- Experiencing His Presence Devotions For God Catchers (Hardcover - October 30, 2001)
- Finding Favor With the King: Preparing For Your Moment in His Presence (Paperback - December 1, 2004)
- Finding Your Way: ... to Things that Really Matter (Faithwords) (Hardcover - January 11, 2008)
- God Chasers by Tommy Tenny (Paperback - February 1, 2005)
- God's Favorite House (Paperback - January 1, 2005)
- Hadassah Covenant, The with Mark Andrew Olsen (Paperback - November 1, 2006)
- Hadassah: One Night with the King (Paperback - January 1, 2005)
- Mary's Prayers and Martha's Recipes (Kindle Edition - September 1, 2006) - Kindle Book
- Road Home, The with Mark Andrew Olsen (Paperback - October 1, 2008)
- Secret Sources of Power (Paperback - July 20, 2000)
- The God Catchers Workbook: Experiencing the Manifest Presence of God (Paperback - July 15, 2008)
- The God Chasers: My Soul Follows Hard After Thee (Paperback - February 1, 1999)
- You Are A God Chaser If... (Hardback- 2002)
