= Agag =

Northwest Semitic name or title applied to a biblical king

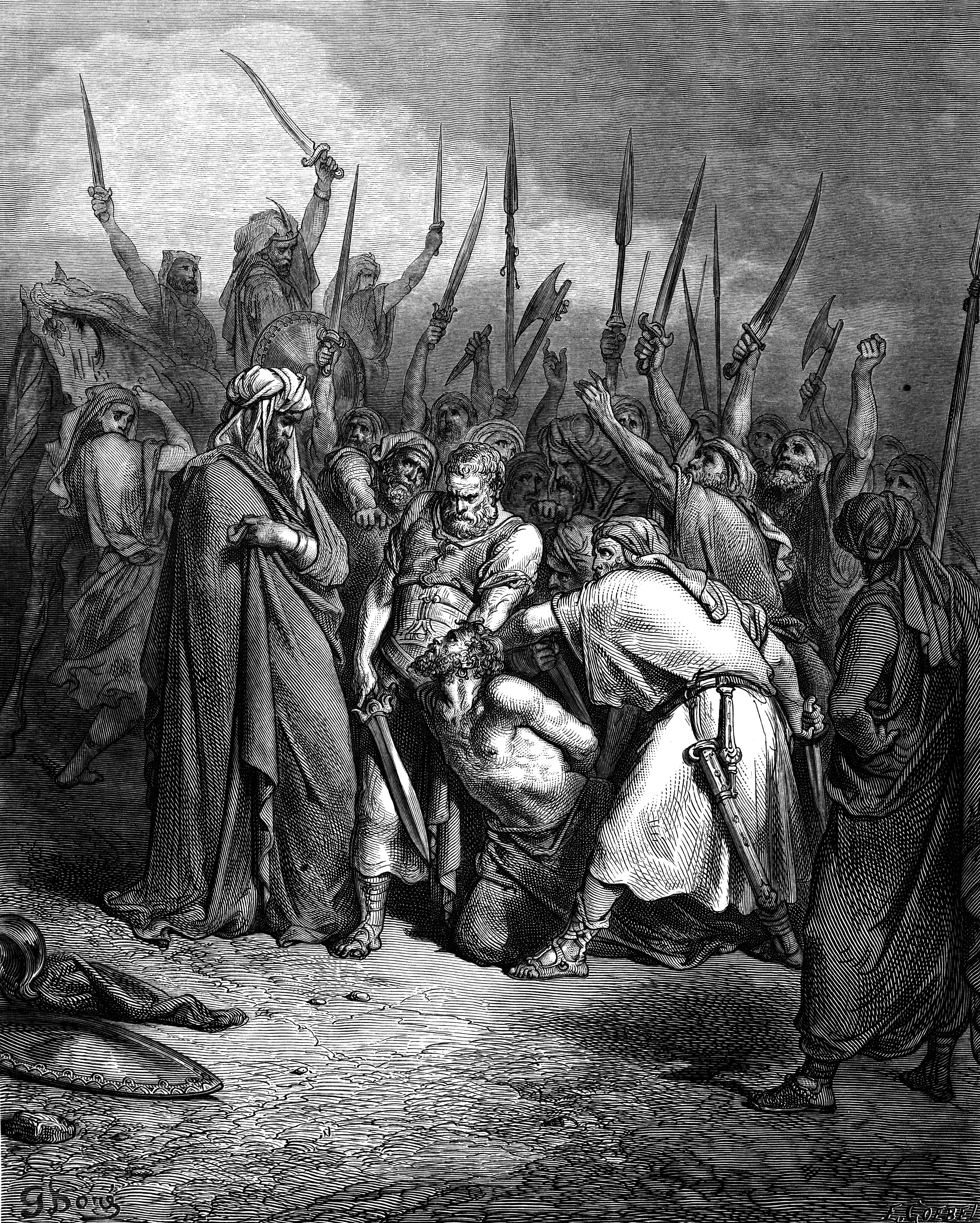
La mort d'Agag, illustration by Gustave Doré

Agag (/ˈeɪɡæɡ/; Hebrew: אֲגָג, romanized: ʾĂḡāḡ) is a Northwest Semitic name or title applied to a biblical king. It has been suggested that "Agag" was a dynastic name of the kings of Amalek, just as Pharaoh was used as a dynastic name for the ancient Egyptians. The etymology is uncertain, according to John L. McKenzie (1995), while Cox (1884) suggested "High."

In the Torah, the expression "Its king higher than Agag, and its kingdom exalted" was uttered by Balaam in Numbers 24:7, in his third prophetic utterance, to describe a king of Israel who would be higher than the king of Amalek. This is understood to mean that Israel's king would take a higher position than even Amalek himself, and would exercise a wider authority. The writer uses an allusion to the literal significance of the word "Agag", meaning "high", to convey that the king of Israel would be "higher than High". A characteristic trait of biblical poetry is the use of puns.

Agag also refers to the Amalekite king who survived King Saul's extermination campaign, as punishment for Amalekite crimes, in the Book of Samuel. Saul failed to execute Agag and allowed the people to keep some of the spoils, and this resulted in Samuel's pronouncement of God's rejection of Saul as king. Agag was then executed by Samuel, to punish him for his offense of "bereaving women of children with the sword".

== Views in Judaism ==
The rabbis taught that the Jews took vengeance on Agag for the cruelties they had undergone at the hands of the Amalekites, who, to mock at the Israelites, their God, and the rite of circumcision, mutilated every Jew that fell into their power. Samuel, they say, treated Agag in the same way. According to some authorities, the death of Agag, described in the Bible by the unusual word va-yeshassef ("hewed in pieces," I Samuel 15:33), was brought about in a much more cruel way than the word denotes. Others think that the only unusual thing in the execution of Agag consisted in the fact that it was not carried out strictly in accordance with the provisions of the Jewish law, requiring witnesses to prove the crime; nor had he been specifically "warned" as the law required. But, Agag being a heathen, Samuel convicted him according to the heathen law, which demanded only evidence of the crime for condemnation (Pesiq. iii. 25b, Pesiq. R. xii. xiii. and the parallel passages quoted by Buber in Pesiq.). The execution of Agag, however, occurred in one respect too late, for had he been killed one day sooner—that is, immediately upon his capture by Saul—the great peril which the Jews had to undergo at the hands of Haman would have been averted, for Agag thereby became a progenitor of Haman (Megillah 13a, Targ. Sheni to Esth. iv. 13).

According to another Midrash, Doeg the Edomite tried to extend the life of Agag, the king of the Amalekites-Edomites, by interpreting Lev. 22:28 into a prohibition against the destruction of both the old and the young in war (Midr. Teh. lii. 4). Doeg is among those who have forfeited their portion in the future world by their wickedness (Sanh. x. 1; compare ib. 109b). Doeg is an instance of the evil consequences of calumny, because by calumniating the priests of Nob he lost his own life, and caused the death of Saul, Abimelech, and Abner (Yer. Peah i. 16a; Midr. Teh. cxx. 9 [ed. Buber, p. 504]).E. C. L. G.

When he received the command to smite Amalek (I Sam. 15:3), Saul said: "For one found slain the Torah requires a sin offering [Deut. 21:1-9]; and here so many shall be slain. If the old have sinned, why should the young suffer; and if men have been guilty, why should the cattle be destroyed?" It was this mildness that cost him his crown (Yoma 22b; Num. R. i. 10)—the fact that he was merciful even to his enemies, being indulgent to rebels themselves, and frequently waiving the homage due to him. If his mercy toward a foe was a sin, it was his misfortune that it was reckoned against him. David, although he had committed much iniquity, was so favored that it was not remembered to his injury (Yoma 22b; M. Ḳ 16b, and Rashi ad loc.).

Harsh as it seems the command to blot out Amalek's memory, its justification was seen in the leniency shown by King Saul, the son of Kish, to Agag, the king of the Amalekites (I Samuel 15:9), which made it possible for Haman the Agagite to appear (Esther 3:1); his cruel plot against the Jews could only be counteracted by another descendant of Kish, Mordecai (Pesiḳ. R. xiii.). Every year, therefore, the chapter, "Remember what Amalek did unto thee" (Deut. 25:17-19), is read in the synagogue on the Sabbath preceding Purim, and the story of Saul and Agag in chapter 15 of I Samuel is read as the Haftarah.
