= Mordecai =

Biblical figure

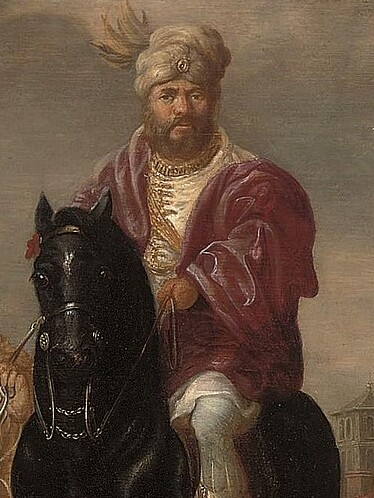
- The Triumph of Mordecai, attrib. Abraham van den Hecken the Younger, between 1635 and 1655
- Children: Esther (cousin and adoptive child)
- Father: Jair

Mordecai (/ˈmɔːrdɪkaɪ, mɔːrdɪˈkeɪaɪ/; also Mordechai; Hebrew: מָרְדֳּכַי, Modern: Mŏrdoḵay, Tiberian: Mārdoḵay, (Note: Sometimes rendered in Modern Hebrew as מָרְדְּכַי Mŏrdəḵay) IPA: [moʁdeˈχaj]) is one of the main personalities in the Book of Esther in the Hebrew Bible. He is the cousin and guardian of Esther, who became queen of Persia under the reign of Ahasuerus (Xerxes I). The king's grand vizier Haman is offended by Mordecai because of his refusal to bow before him, and when confronted, Mordecai's excuse is that he was a Jew. Consequently, Haman plots to have all of Persia's Jews killed, and eventually convinces Ahasuerus to permit him to do so. Mordecai's loyalty and bravery are highlighted throughout the story as he convinces Esther to use her position as queen to foil the plot of Haman, the king's vizier, to exterminate the Jewish people. His story is celebrated in the Jewish holiday of Purim, which commemorates his victory.

The historicity of Mordecai and the other characters in the Book of Esther, is a topic of longstanding debate. Traditionally seen as historical characters, there are scholars which still ascribe to this view. A popular theory frequently discussed in scholarship suggests that the Book of Esther serves as an etiology for Purim, with Mordecai and Esther representing the Babylonian gods Marduk and Ishtar in a historicized Babylonian myth or ritual. The identification of Mordecai with a Persian official named "Marduka" mentioned in an inscription from the reign of Xerxes I is debated, with some scholars rejecting the connection while others support it due to the commonality of name and office. Even if the Marduka who was mentioned in the inscription was not Mordecai himself it shows the name was in use during that period.

== Biblical account ==
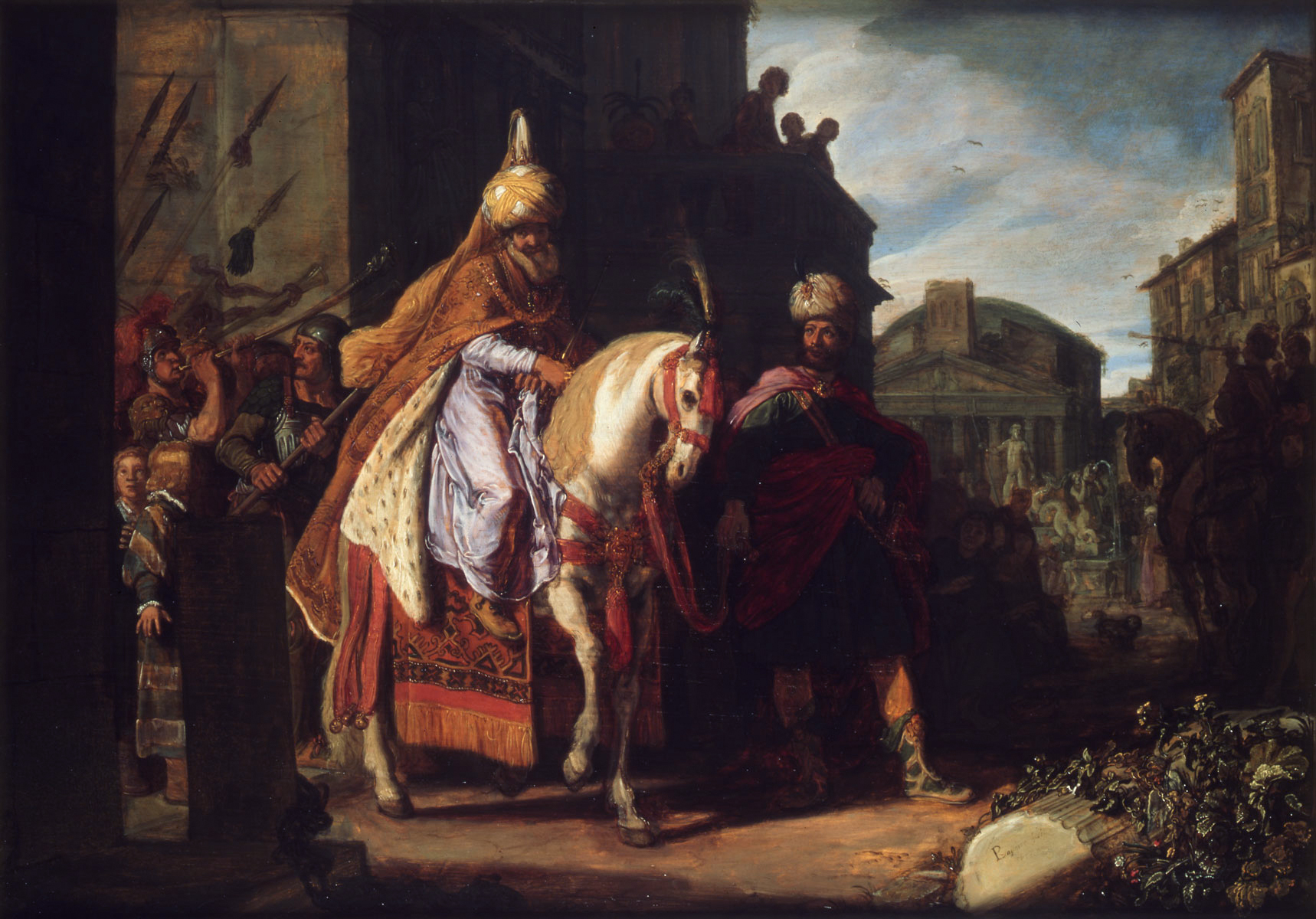
The Triumph of Mordecai by Pieter Lastman, 1624

Mordecai resided in Susa (Shushan or Shoushan), the metropolis of Persia (now Iran). He adopted his orphaned cousin (Esther 2:7), Hadassah (Esther), whom he brought up as if she were his own daughter. When "young virgins" were sought, she was taken into the presence of King Ahasuerus and was made queen in the place of the exiled queen Vashti. Subsequently, Mordecai discovered a plot of the king's chamberlains Bigthan and Teresh to assassinate the king. Because of Mordecai's vigilance, the plot was foiled.

Haman the Agagite had been raised to the highest position at court. In spite of the king's decree that all should prostrate themselves before Haman, Mordecai refused to do so. Haman, stung by Mordecai's refusal, resolved to kill not only Mordecai but all Jewish exiles throughout the Persian empire, and won the king's permission to carry out his plan. Mordecai communicated Haman's scheme to Queen Esther, who used her favor with the king to reverse the scheme, leading the king to authorize Jews to kill their enemies, which they did.

During all this, the king had happened to learn of Mordecai's service in foiling the assassination plot and had asked Haman how a person who did a great service to the king should be honored. Haman answered, thinking the question was about him; and the king followed this advice, and honored Mordecai, and eventually made Mordecai his chief advisor. Haman was executed on gallows that he had set up for Mordecai. The feast of Purim celebrates these reversals of fortune.

== History ==
=== Book of Esther ===
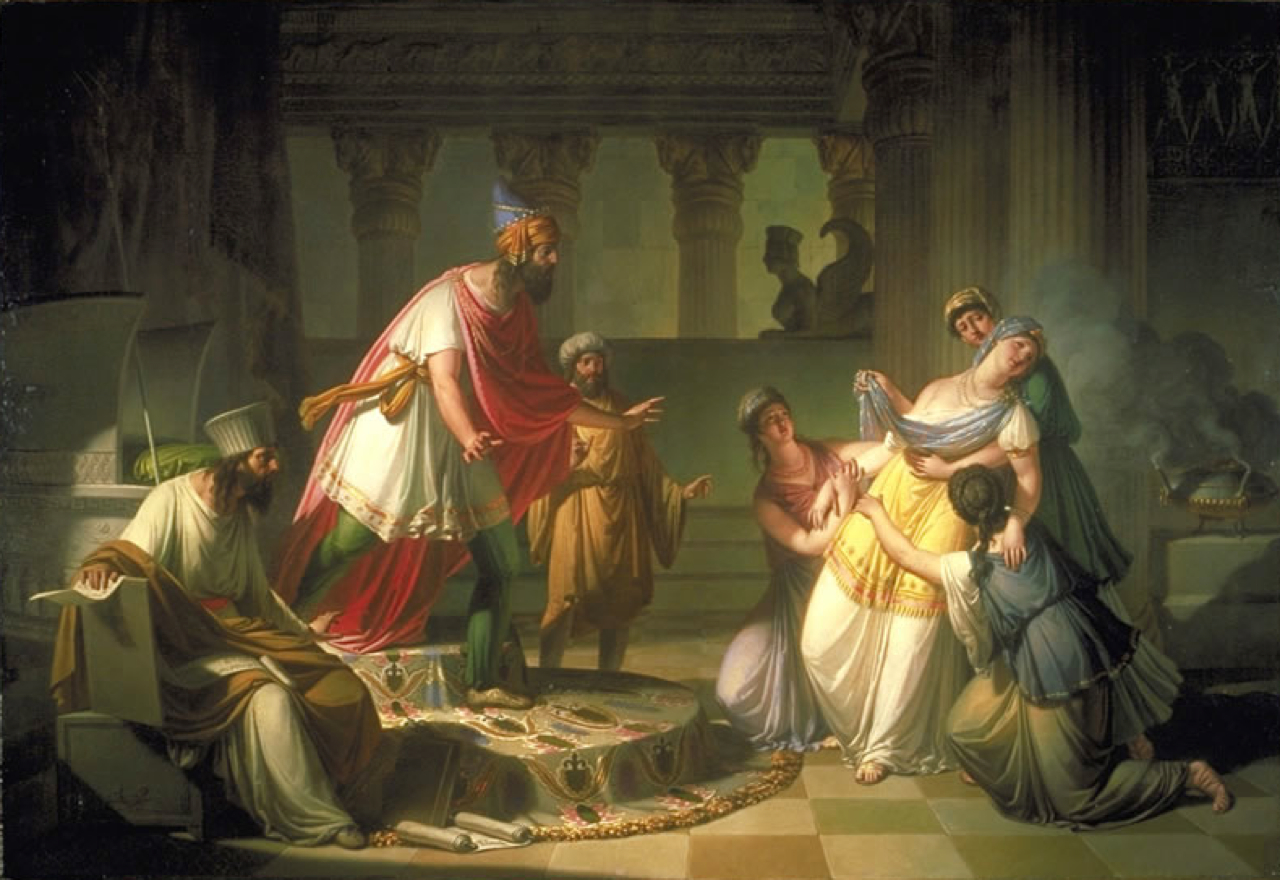
Esther before Ahasuerus by Franc Kavčič, 1815

Although the details of the setting are entirely plausible and the story may even have some basis in actual events, some think that the book of Esther is a novella rather than history. Persian kings did not marry outside of seven Persian noble families, making it unlikely that there was a Jewish queen Esther, and in any case the historical Xerxes's queen was Amestris.

There is a scholarly conjecture that the story was created to justify the Jewish appropriation of an originally non-Jewish feast. The festival which the book explains is purim, which is explained as meaning "lot", from the Babylonian word puru. There are wide-ranging theories regarding the origin of Purim: one popular theory says festival has its origins in a historicized Babylonian myth or ritual in which Mordecai and Esther represent the Babylonian gods Marduk and Ishtar, others trace the ritual to the Persian New Year, and scholars have surveyed other theories in their works. Some scholars have defended the story as real history, but others have said the attempt to find a historical kernel to the narrative "is likely to be futile".

=== Name ===
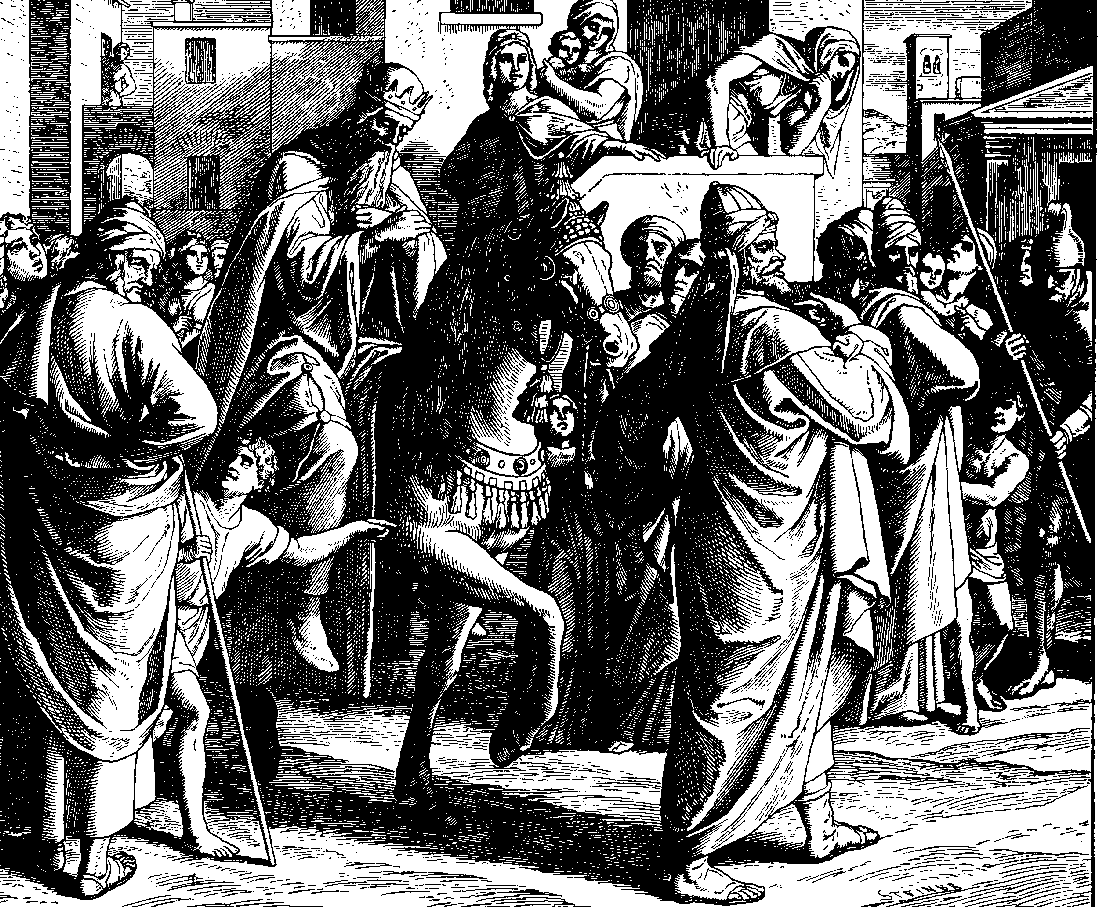
Mordecai is honored in this 1860 woodcut by Julius Schnorr von Karolsfeld

The name "Mordecai" is of uncertain origin but is considered identical to the name Marduka or Marduku (Elamite: 𒈥𒁺𒋡), attested as the name of up to four Persian court officials in thirty texts (the Persepolis Administrative Archives) from the period of Xerxes I and his father Darius.

The Talmud (Menachot 64b and 65a) relates that his full name was "Mordechai Bilshan" (which occurs in Ezra 2:2 and Nehemiah 7:7, albeit likely as two separate names in sequence). Hoschander interpreted this as the Babylonian "Marduk-belshunu" (𒀭𒀫𒌓𒂗𒋗𒉡, ^{d}AMAR.UTU-EN-šu-nu, meaning "Marduk is their lord") "Mordecai" being thus a hypocorism.

In the King James Version of the deuterocanonical Greek additions to Esther, his name is spelled as "Mardocheus", which may better preserve the original vowels, though the Masoretic Text versions of the Persian names in the Bible are known to be the most reliable.

=== Age ===
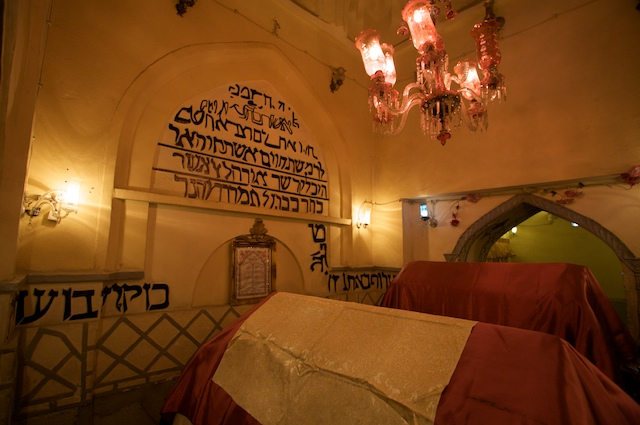
Tomb of Esther and Mordechai

Esther 2:5-6 contains a short snippet of Mordecai's genealogical history, generally translated as, "Mordecai, the son of Jair, the son of Shimei, the son of Kish, who had been carried into exile from Jerusalem by Nebuchadnezzar king of Babylon, among those taken captive with Jeconiah king of Judah". The wording of the passage lends to two conclusions: either that Mordecai (the son of Jair, the son of Shimei, the son of Kish) was carried into exile by Nebuchadnezzar, or that his ancestor Kish was the one carried into exile.

The Pentecostal minister Finis Dake interprets the Bible verses Esther 2:5–6 to mean that Mordecai himself was exiled by Nebuchadnezzar. Biblical scholar Michael D. Coogan discusses this as an inaccuracy regarding Mordecai's age. If "who had been carried into exile" refers to Mordecai, he would have had been more than 100 years old during the events described in the Book of Esther (assuming the biblical Ahasuerus is indeed Xerxes I). However, the verse may be read as referring not to Mordecai's exile to Babylon, but to his great-grandfather Kish's exile — a reading which many accept.

=== Genealogy ===
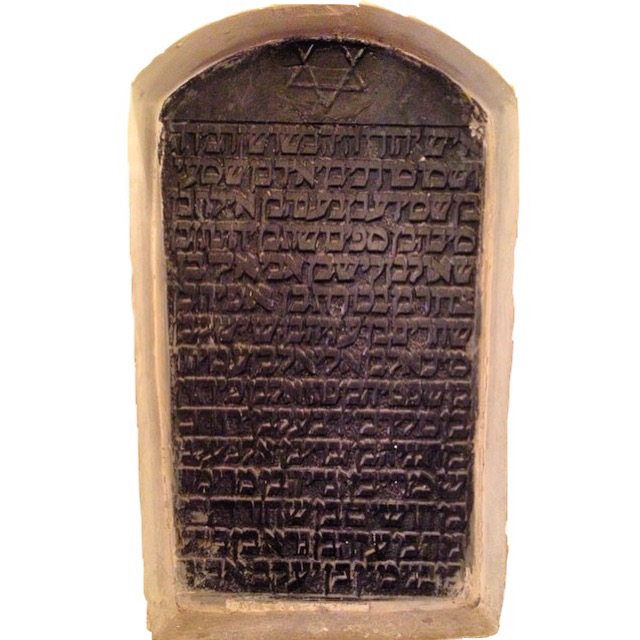
The tablet of Mordechai's ancestry in the tomb traditionally ascribed to him and Esther

The Targum Sheni gives his genealogy in more detail, as follows: (Note: Textual variants indicated in appendices) "Mordecai, son of Jair, son of Shimei, son of Shemida, (Note: Shamyadah) son of Ba'anah, son of Elah, son of Micah, son of Mephibosheth, son of Jonathan, son of Saul, son of Kish, son of Abiel, son of Zeror, son of Bechorath, son of Aphiah, (Note: Aphrach) son of Shecharim, (Note: Shacharit) son of Uzziah, son of Sason, (Note: Shishak) son of Michael, son of Eliel, son of Amihud, son of Shephatiah, son of Penuel, (Note: Petuel) son of Petah, (Note: Piton) son of Melokh, son of Yerubaal, (Note: Yekhobaal) son of Yeruham, son of Hananiah, son of Zabdi, son of Elpa'al, son of Shimri, son of Zebadiah, son of Rimoth, (Note: Merimoth) son of Khashum, (Note: Khoshim) son of Shekhorah, son of Gazza, son of 'Uzza, son of Gera, son of Bela, son of Benjamin, son of Jacob the firstborn, whose name is called Israel." The same genealogy is inscribed on a massive metal tablet in the Tomb of Esther and Mordechai (pictured).

This traditional genealogy implicates Kish as the name of an ancient ancestor and not simply Mordecai's great-grandfather, meaning that Esther 2:5—6 was interpreted as Mordecai being the one who was exiled to Babylon. The chronological inconsistencies of this assumption are detailed above.

== Prophet status ==
The Talmud lists Esther as a prophet. Some talmudic scholars such as Nachman b. Yaakov have suggested that Mordecai is the Biblical prophet Malachi, but this argument is rejected by other scholars in the Talmud.

Mordecai's genealogy in the second chapter of the Book of Esther is given as a descendant of a Benjaminite named Kish. As "Kish" was also the name of the father of King Saul, another Benjaminite, the Talmud accords Mordecai the status of a descendant of the first King of Israel.

== See also ==
- Marduk
- Persian Jews
