= Book of Esther =

Book of the Hebrew Bible and the Christian Old Testament

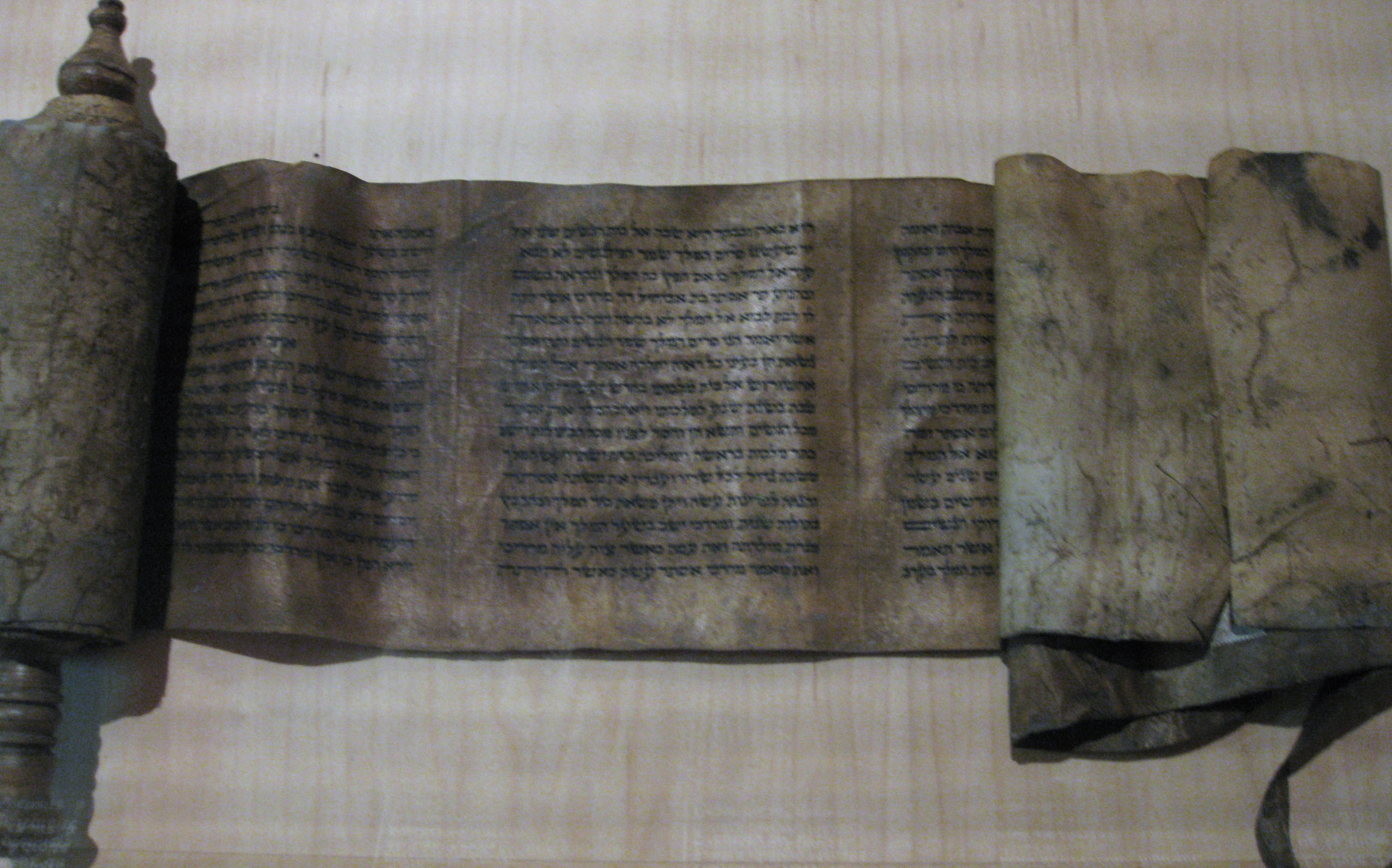
A 13th–14th-century scroll of the Book of Esther from Fez, Morocco, held at the Musée du Quai Branly in Paris. Traditionally, a scroll of Esther is given only one roller, fixed to its lefthand side, rather than the two used for a Torah scroll.

The Book of Esther (Hebrew: מְגִלַּת אֶסְתֵּר, romanized: Megillat Ester; Greek: Ἐσθήρ; Latin: Liber Esther), also known in Hebrew as "the Scroll" ("the Megillah"), is a book in the third section (Ketuvim, כְּתוּבִים "Writings") of the Hebrew Bible. It is one of the Five Scrolls (Megillot) in the Hebrew Bible and later became part of the Christian Old Testament. The book relates the story of a Jewish woman in Persia, born as Hadassah but known as Esther, who becomes queen of Persia and thwarts a genocide of her people.

The story takes place during the reign of King Ahasuerus in the Achaemenid Empire. Queen Vashti, the wife of King Ahasuerus, is banished from the court for disobeying the king's orders. A beauty pageant is held to find a new queen, and Esther, a young Jewish woman living in Persia, is chosen as the new queen. Esther's cousin Mordecai, who is a Jewish leader, discovers a plot to kill all of the Jews in the empire by Haman, one of the king's advisors. Mordecai urges Esther to use her position as queen to intervene and save their people. Esther reveals her Jewish identity to the king and begs for mercy for her people. She exposes Haman's plot and convinces the king to spare the Jews. The Jewish festival of Purim is established to celebrate the victory of the Jews of the First Persian Empire over their enemies, and Esther becomes a heroine of the Jewish people.

The books of Esther and Song of Songs are the only books in the Hebrew Bible that do not mention God explicitly. Traditional Judaism views the absence of God's overt intervention in the story as an example of how God can work through seemingly coincidental events and the actions of individuals.

The book is at the center of the Jewish festival of Purim and is read aloud twice from a handwritten scroll, usually in a synagogue, during the holiday: once in the evening and again the following morning. The distribution of charity to those in need and the exchange of gifts of foods are also practices observed on the holiday that are mandated in the book. Although traditionally seen as a historical document, according to biblical scholars, the narrative of Esther was written to provide an etiology for Purim's origin.

== Setting and structure ==
=== Setting ===
The biblical Book of Esther is set in the Persian capital of Susa (Shushan) in the third year of the reign of the Persian king Ahasuerus. The name Ahasuerus is equivalent to Xerxes (both deriving from the Persian Khshayārsha), and Ahasuerus is usually identified in modern sources as Xerxes I, who ruled between 486 and 465 BCE, as it is to this monarch that the events described in Esther are thought to fit the most closely.

Assuming that Ahasuerus is indeed Xerxes I, the events described in Esther began around the years 483–482 BCE, and concluded in March 473 BCE.

Classical sources such as Josephus, the Jewish commentary Esther Rabbah and the Christian theologian Bar Hebraeus, as well as the Greek Septuagint translation of Esther, instead identify Ahasuerus as either Artaxerxes I (reigned 465 to 424 BCE) or Artaxerxes II (reigned 404 to 358 BCE).

On his accession, however, Artaxerxes II lost Egypt to pharaoh Amyrtaeus, after which it was no longer part of the Persian empire. In his Historia Scholastica, Petrus Comestor identified Ahasuerus (Esther 1:1) as Artaxerxes III (358–338 BCE) who reconquered Egypt.

Some traditional scholars identify Ahasuerus as Cambyses II due to alignment with traditional Jewish sources including Seder Olam Rabba.

=== Structure ===
The Book of Esther consists of an introduction (or exposition) in chapters 1 and 2; the main action (complication and resolution) in chapters 3 to 9:19; and a conclusion in 9:20–10:3.

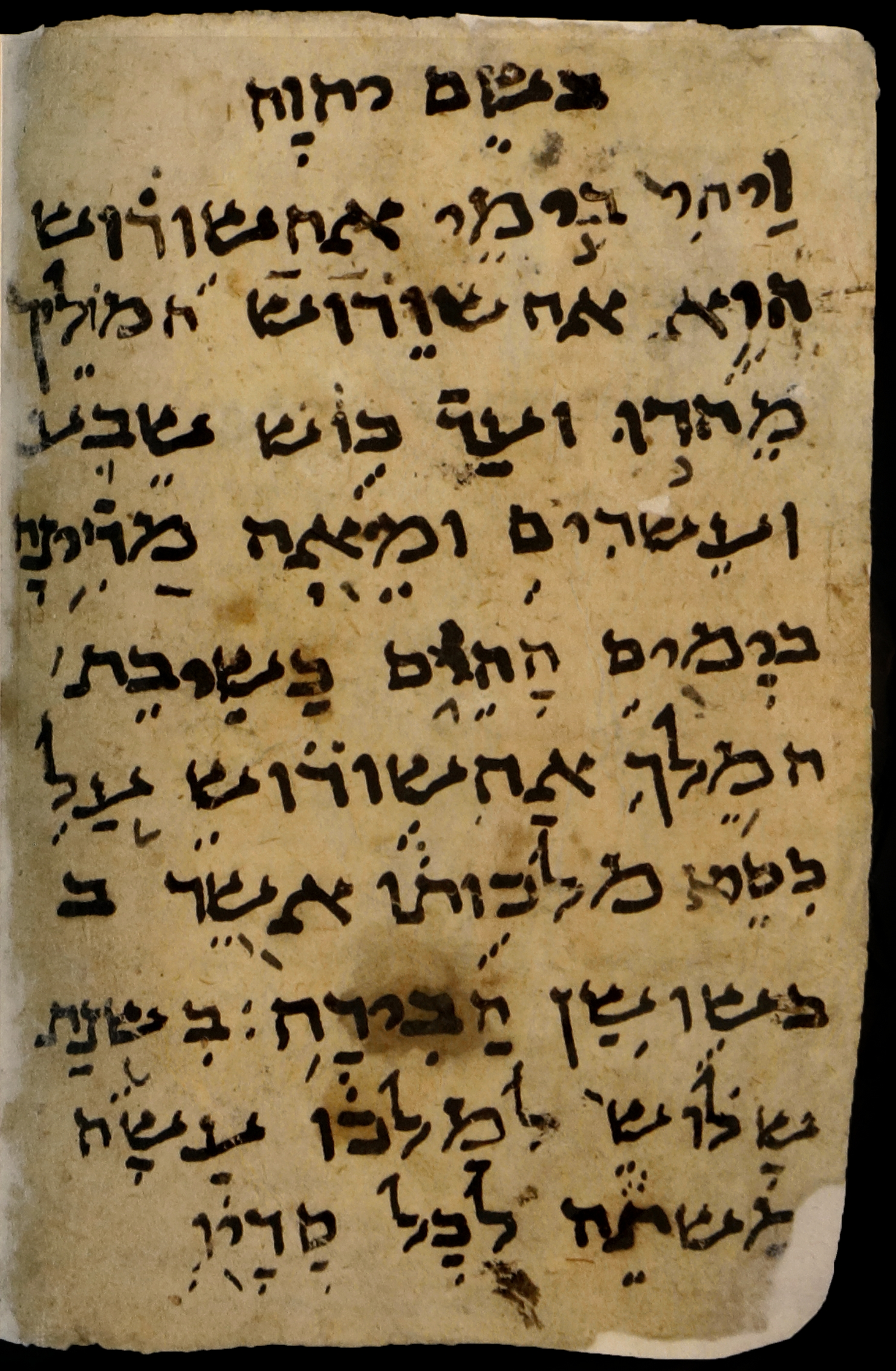
The introduction of Book of Esther, hand written, part of Cairo Gniza, digital collections of Younes & Soraya Nazarian Library, University of Haifa

The plot is structured around banquets (Hebrew: מִשְׁתֶּה, romanized: mišˈte, plural מִשְׁתָּאוֹת mištāˈoṯ or מִשְׁתִּים mišˈtim), a word that occurs twenty times in Esther and only 24 times in the rest of the Hebrew bible. This is appropriate given that Esther describes the origin of a Jewish feast, the feast of Purim, but Purim itself is not the subject and no individual feast in the book is commemorated by Purim. The book's theme, rather, is the reversal of destiny through a sudden and unexpected turn of events: the Jews seem destined to be destroyed, but instead are saved. In literary criticism such a reversal is termed "peripety", and while on one level its use in Esther is simply a literary or aesthetic device, on another it is structural to the author's theme, suggesting that the power of God is at work behind human events.

The book of Esther has more Akkadian and Aramaic loanwords than any other biblical work and the names of the key protagonists, Mordecai and Esther, for example, have been read as allusions to the gods Marduk and Ishtar, who, symbolizing respectively Babylonia and Assyria, were twin powers that brought about the fall of Susa, where the narrative of Esther is set and where the Elamite god Humban/Humman (compare Haman) exercised divine sovereignty. Purim practices like eating "Haman's ears", ear-shaped loaves of bread or pieces of pastry are similar to those in Near Eastern ritual celebrations of Ishtar's cosmic victory. Likewise other elements in Purim customs such as making a racket with a ratchet, masquerading and drunkenness have all been adduced to propose that such a kind of pagan festival akin to rites associated with Ishtar of Nineveh, which shares these same features, lay behind the development of this story.

== Summary ==
King Ahasuerus, ruler of the Persian Empire, holds a lavish 180-day banquet for his court and dignitaries from across the 127 provinces of his empire (Esther 1:1–4), and afterwards, a seven-day banquet for all inhabitants of the capital city, Shushan (1:5–9). On the seventh day of the latter banquet, Ahasuerus orders the queen, Vashti, to display her beauty before the guests by coming before them wearing her crown (1:10–11). She refuses, infuriating Ahasuerus, who, on the advice of his counselors, removes her from her position as an example to other women who might be emboldened to disobey their husbands (1:12–19). A decree follows that "every man should bear rule in his own house" (1:20–22).

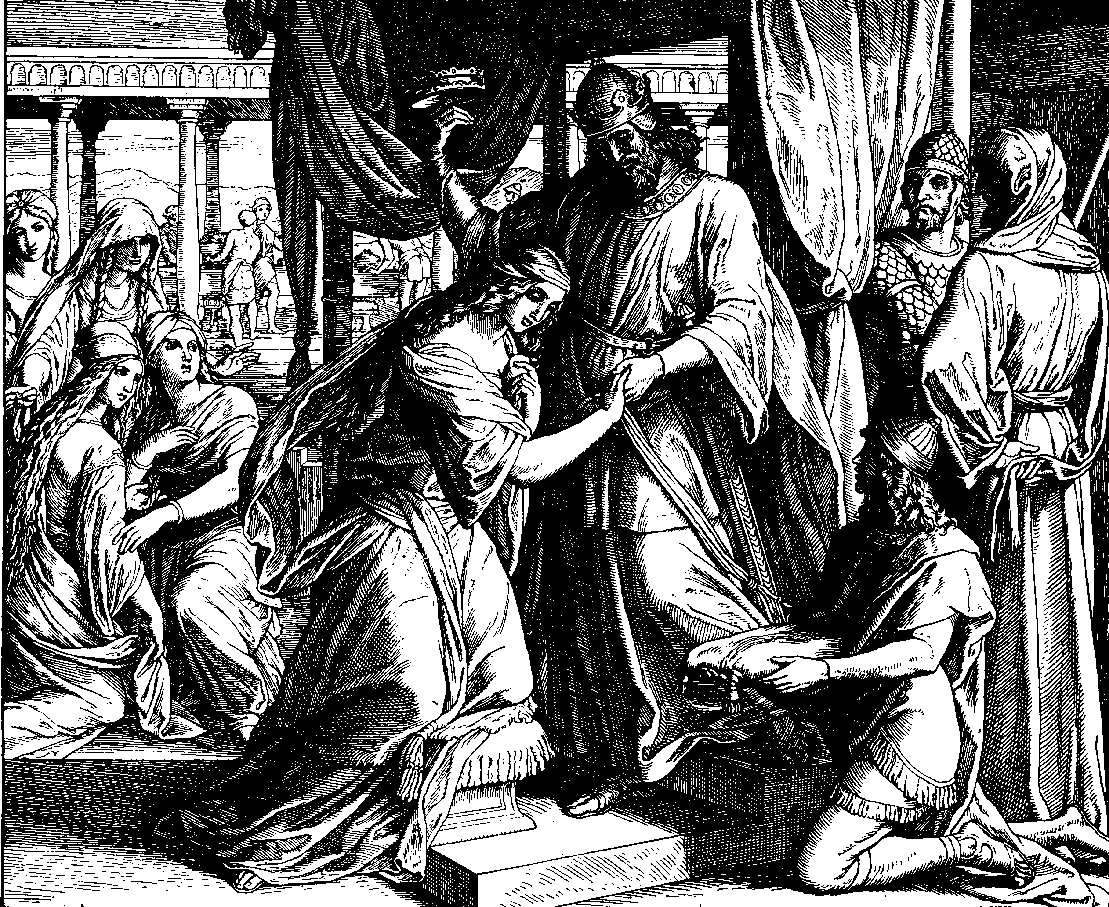
Esther is crowned in this 1860 woodcut by Julius Schnorr von Carolsfeld

Ahasuerus then makes arrangements to choose a new queen from a selection of beautiful young women throughout the empire (2:1–4). Among these women is a Jewish orphan named Esther, who was raised by her cousin or uncle, Mordecai (2:5–7). She finds favour in the King's eyes and is crowned his new queen, but does not reveal her Jewish heritage (2:8–20). Shortly afterwards, Mordecai discovers a plot by two courtiers, Bigthan and Teresh, to assassinate Ahasuerus. The conspirators are apprehended and hanged, and Mordecai's service to the King is officially recorded (2:21–23).

Ahasuerus appoints Haman as his viceroy (3:1). Mordecai, who sits at the palace gates, falls into Haman's disfavour, as he refuses to bow down to him (3:2–5). Haman discovers that Mordecai refuses to bow on account of his being a Jew, and in revenge, plots to kill not just Mordecai but all the Jews in the empire (3:6). He obtains Ahasuerus' permission to execute this plan against payment of ten thousand talents of silver, and casts lots ("purim") to choose the date on which to do this – the thirteenth of the month of Adar (3:7–12). A royal decree is issued throughout the kingdom to slay all Jews on that date (3:13–15).

When Mordecai discovers the plan, he goes into mourning and implores Esther to intercede with the King (4:1–5). But she fears presenting herself to the King unsummoned, an offense punishable by death (4:6–12). Instead, she directs Mordecai to have all Jews fast for three days for her and vows to fast as well (4:15–16). On the third day, she goes to Ahasuerus, who stretches out his scepter to her to indicate that she should not be punished (5:1–2). She invites him to a feast in the company of Haman (5:3–5). During the feast, she asks them to attend a further feast the next evening (5:6–8). Meanwhile, Haman is again offended by Mordecai and, at his wife's suggestion, has a gallows built to hang him (5:9–14).

That night, Ahasuerus cannot sleep and orders the court records be read to him (6:1). He is reminded that Mordecai interceded in the previous plot against his life and discovers that Mordecai never received any recognition (6:2–3). Just then, Haman appears to request the King's permission to hang Mordecai, but before he can make this request, Ahasuerus asks Haman what should be done for the man that the King wishes to honour (6:4–6). Assuming that the King is referring to Haman himself, Haman suggests that the man be dressed in the King's royal robes and crown and led around on the King's royal horse, while a herald calls: "See how the King honours a man he wishes to reward!" (6:7–9). To his surprise and horror, the King instructs Haman to do so to Mordecai (6:10–11).

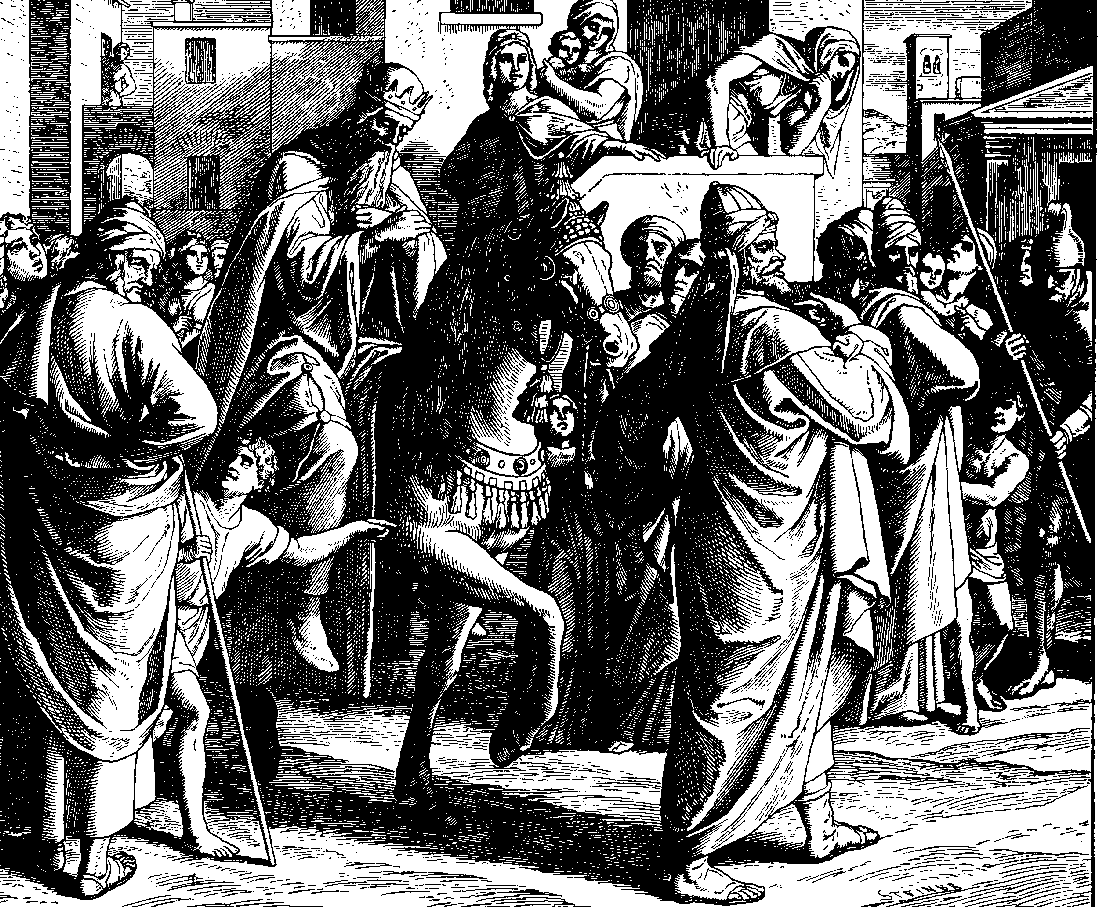
Mordecai is honoured in this 1860 woodcut by Julius Schnorr von Carolsfeld

Immediately afterwards, Ahasuerus and Haman attend Esther's second banquet. The King promises to grant her any request, and she reveals that she is Jewish and that Haman is planning to exterminate her people, including herself (7:1–6). Overcome by rage, Ahasuerus leaves the room; meanwhile Haman stays behind and begs Esther for his life, falling upon her in desperation (7:7). The King comes back at this very moment and mistakes Haman's plea for mercy as an attempt at sexually assaulting the queen; this makes him angrier and he orders Haman hanged on the very gallows that Haman had prepared for Mordecai (7:8–10).

Unable to annul a formal royal decree, the King instead adds to it, permitting the Jews to join and destroy any and all who they perceive as enemies - alongside their woman and children - and to plunder their property (8:1–14). On 13 Adar, Haman's ten sons and 500 other men are killed in Shushan (9:1–12). Upon hearing of this Esther requests it be repeated the next day, whereupon 300 more men are killed (9:13–15). In the other Persian provinces, 75,000 people are slaughtered by the Jews (9:16–17). Mordecai and Esther then send letters throughout the provinces instituting an annual commemoration of the Jewish people's redemption, in a holiday called Purim (lots) (9:20–28). Ahasuerus remains very powerful and continues his reign, with Mordecai assuming a prominent position in his court (10:1–3).

== Versions and canonization ==
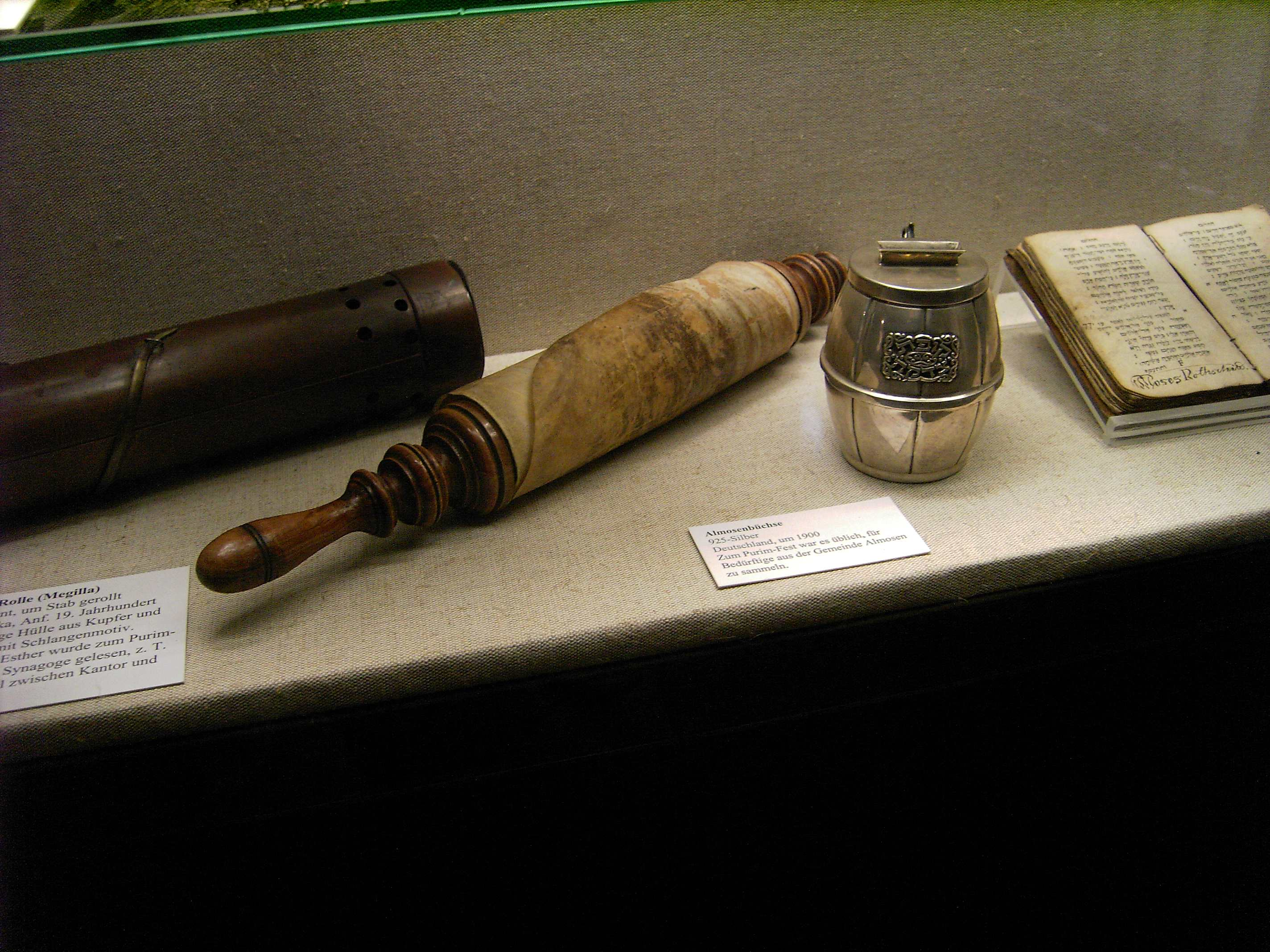
Scroll of Esther (Megillah)

The Megillat Esther (Book of Esther) became the last of the 24 books of the Hebrew Bible to be canonized by the Sages of the Great Assembly. According to the Talmud, it was a redaction by the Great Assembly of an original text by Mordecai. It is usually dated to the 4th century BCE.

The Greek book of Esther, included in the Septuagint, is a retelling of the events of the Hebrew Book of Esther rather than a translation and records additional traditions which do not appear in the traditional Hebrew version, in particular the identification of Ahasuerus with Artaxerxes II and details of various letters. It is dated around the late 2nd to early 1st century BCE. The Coptic and Ethiopic versions of Esther are translations of the Greek rather than the Hebrew Esther.

A Latin version of Esther was produced by Jerome for the Vulgate. It translates the Hebrew Esther but interpolates translations of the Greek Esther where the latter provides additional material. Predating the Vulgate, however, the Vetus Latina ("Old Latin") was apparently translated from a different Greek version not included in the Septuagint.

Several Aramaic targumim of Esther were produced in the Middle Ages, of which three survive – the Targum Rishon ("First Targum" or 1TgEsth) and Targum Sheni ("Second Targum" or 2TgEsth) dated c. 500–1000 CE, which include additional legends relating to Purim, and the Targum Shelishi ("Third Targum" or 3TgEsth), which Berliner and Goshen-Gottstein argued was the ur-Targum from which the others had been expanded, but which others consider only a late recension of the same. 3TgEsth is the most manuscript-stable of the three, and by far the most literal.

== Historicity ==
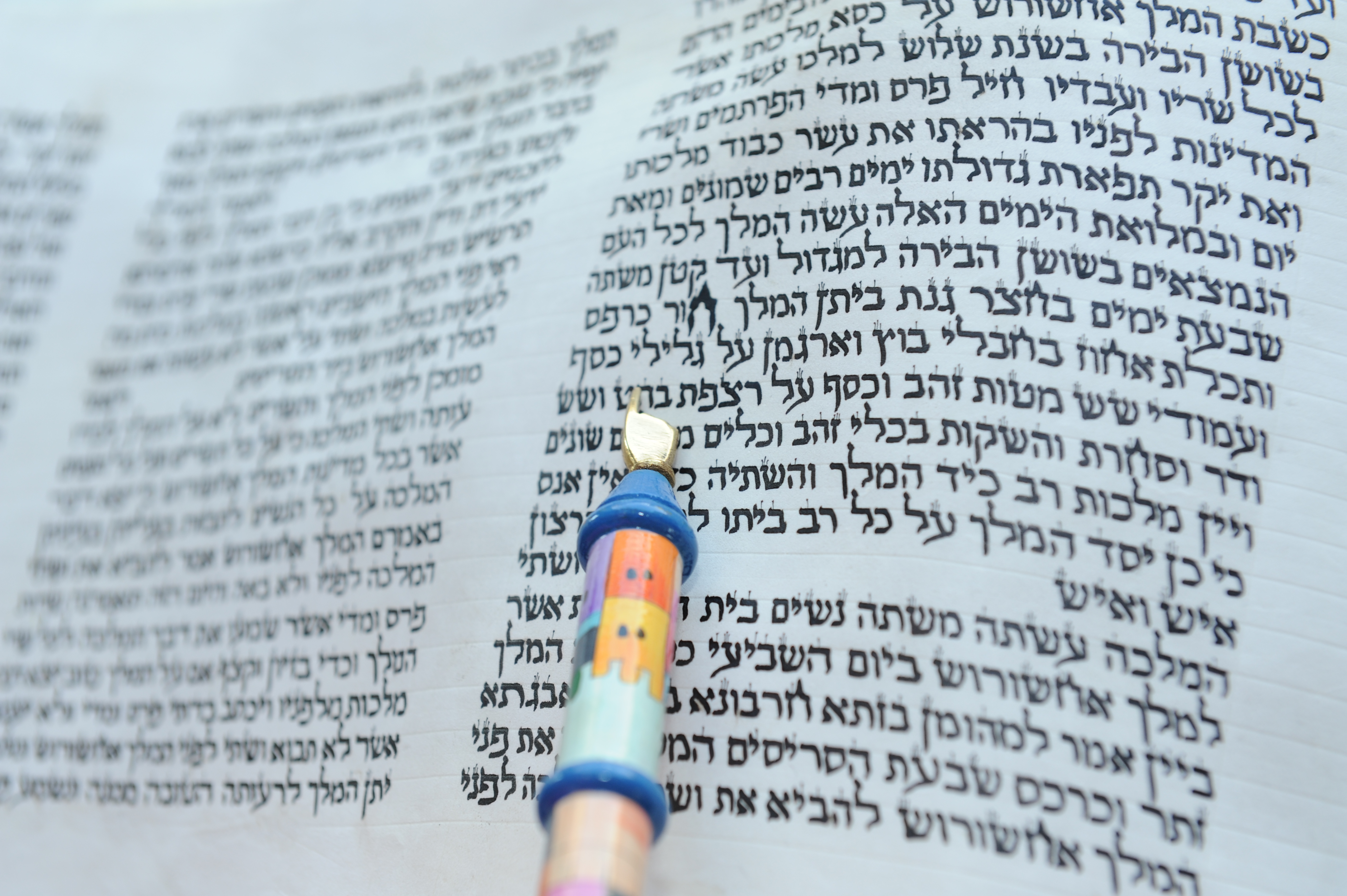
The opening chapter of a hand-written scroll of the Book of Esther, with reader's Torah pointer

The apparent historical difficulties, the internal inconsistencies, the pronounced symmetry of themes and events, the plenitude of quoted dialogue, and the gross exaggeration in the reporting of numbers (involving time, money, and people) have led some to claim that Esther is a work of fiction, its vivid characters (except for Xerxes) being the product of the author's creative imagination. John Barton writes that most scholars believe that Esther is "a kind of novella rather than a piece of historical writing." There is no reference to known historical events in the story; a general consensus, though this consensus has been challenged, has maintained that the narrative of Esther was invented in order to provide an etiology for Purim, and the name Ahasuerus is usually understood to refer to a fictionalized Xerxes I, who ruled the Achaemenid Empire between 486 and 465 BCE. Longman, Dillard, and Jobes feel that the historical issues in the Book of Esther are not insurmountable; they can be resolved with some thought and effort. Longman and Dillard also feel that the book should be read as a historical narrative since the author presents it as history.

Biblical scholar Michael Coogan further argues that the book contains specific details regarding certain subject matter (for example, Persian rule) which are historically inaccurate. For example, Coogan discusses an inaccuracy regarding the age of Esther's cousin (or, according to others, uncle) Mordecai. In Esther 2:5–6, either Mordecai or his great-grandfather Kish is identified as having been exiled from Jerusalem to Babylon by King Nebuchadnezzar II in 597 BCE: "Mordecai son of Jair, the son of Shimei, the son of Kish, who had been carried into exile from Jerusalem by Nebuchadnezzar king of Babylon, among those taken captive with Jeconiah king of Judah". If this refers to Mordecai, he would have had to live over a century to have witnessed the events described in the Book of Esther. However, the verse may be read as referring not to Mordecai's exile to Babylon, but to his great-grandfather Kish's exile.

In her article "The Book of Esther and Ancient Storytelling", biblical scholar Adele Berlin discusses the reasoning behind scholarly concern about the historicity of Esther. Much of this debate relates to the importance of distinguishing history and fiction within biblical texts, as Berlin argues, in order to gain a more accurate understanding of the history of the Israelite people. Berlin quotes a series of scholars who suggest that the author of Esther did not mean for the book to be considered as a historical writing, but intentionally wrote it to be a historical novella. The genre of novellas under which Esther falls was common during both the Persian and Hellenistic periods to which scholars have dated the book of Esther (see for example the deuterocanonical Book of Judith).

However, there are certain elements of the book of Esther that are historically accurate. The story told in the book of Esther takes place during the rule of Ahasuerus, who amongst others has been identified as the 5th-century Persian king Xerxes I (reigned 486–465 BCE). The author also displays an accurate knowledge of Persian customs and palaces. "Levenson claims that it is 'best seen as a historical novella set within the Persian empire'". The New Oxford Annotated Bible (2018) states "Esther is not a work of history but a historical novella, that is, a fictional story set within a historical framework." Lloyd Llewellyn-Jones agrees (in 2023). The International Standard Bible Encyclopedia (1939) offers a dissenting opinion, stating that "research has heaped up confirmation of the historical character of the book." Baldwin (1984) sees the Book of Esther as true and historically accurate, quoting Robert Gordis: "There is nothing intrinsically impossible or improbable in the central incident when the accretions due to the storyteller's art are set aside."

In the mainstream academia, the consensus is that "the book is fictional, a kind of historical novella written to provide an etiology, a narrative explanation, for the Jewish festival of Purim." According to Noss (1993), the historicity of the work is supported by the precision with which the author locates his story within time; the inclusion of the Persian names of the months is part of the author's case for historical authenticity.

== Historical reading ==
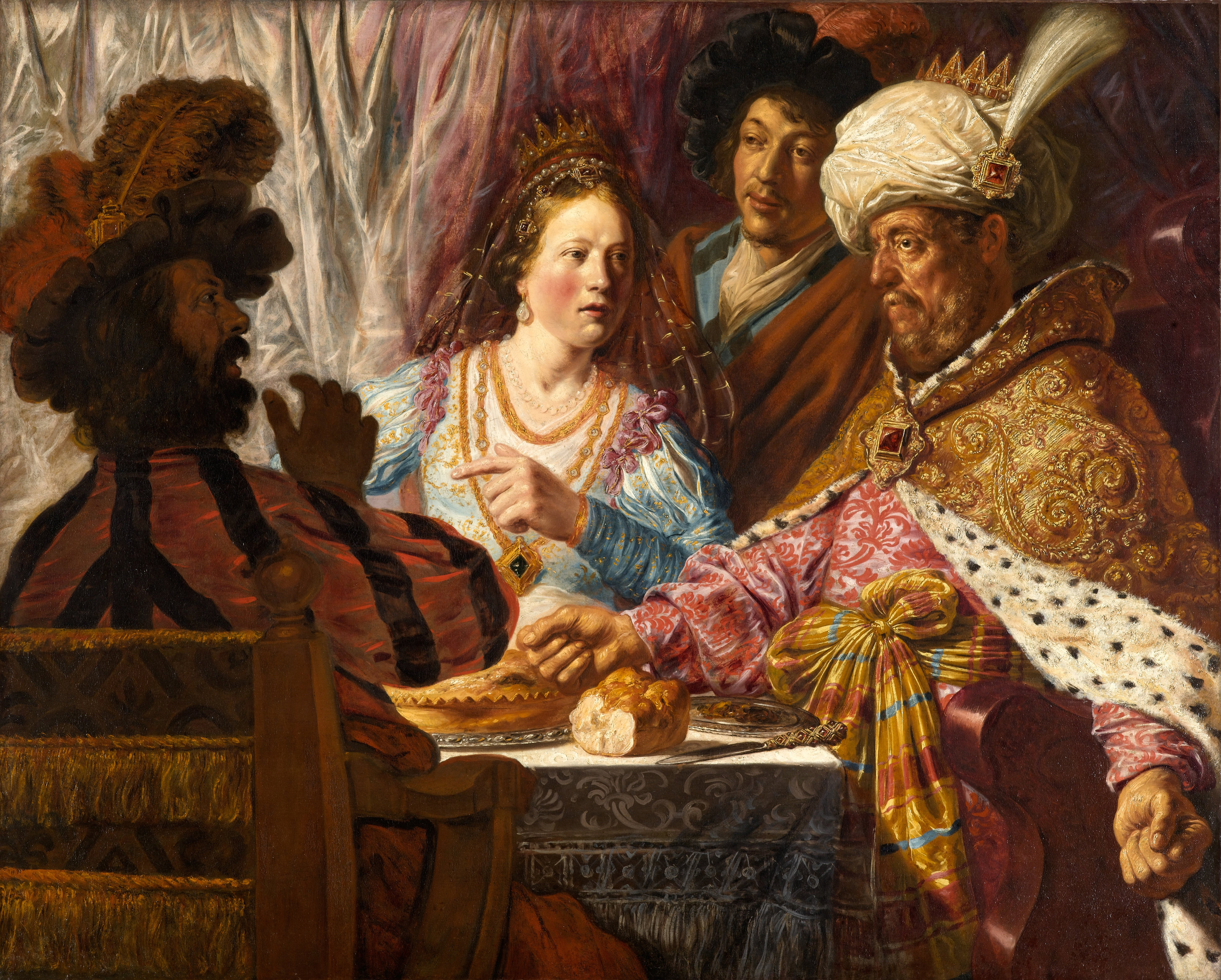
The Feast of Esther (Feest van Esther, 1625) by Jan Lievens, North Carolina Museum of Art

Those arguing in favour of a historical reading of Esther most commonly identify Ahasuerus with Xerxes I (ruled 486–465 BCE), although in the past it was often assumed that he was Artaxerxes II (ruled 405–359 BCE). The Hebrew Ahasuerus (ʔaḥašwērōš) is most likely derived from Persian Xšayārša, the origin of the Greek Xerxes. The Greek historian Herodotus wrote that Xerxes sought his harem after being defeated in the Greco-Persian Wars. He makes no reference to individual members of the harem except for a domineering Queen consort named Amestris, whose father, Otanes, was one of Xerxes's generals. (In contrast, the Greek historian Ctesias refers to a similar father-in-law/general figure named Onaphas.) Amestris has often been identified with Vashti, but this identification is problematic, as Amestris remained a powerful figure well into the reign of her son, Artaxerxes I, whereas Vashti is portrayed as dismissed in the early part of Xerxes's reign. Alternative attempts have been made to identify her with Esther, although Esther is an orphan whose father was a Jew named Abihail.

As for the identity of Mordecai, the similar names Marduka and Marduku have been found as the name of officials in the Persian court in over thirty texts from the period of Xerxes I and his father Darius I, and may refer to up to four individuals, one of whom might be the model for the biblical Mordecai.

The "Old Greek" Septuagint version of Esther translates the name Ahasuerus as Artaxerxes, a Greek name derived from the Persian Artaxšaθra. Josephus too relates that this was the name by which he was known to the Greeks, and the Midrashic text Esther Rabbah also makes the identification. Bar Hebraeus identified Ahasuerus explicitly as Artaxerxes II; however, the names are not necessarily equivalent: Hebrew has a form of the name Artaxerxes distinct from Ahasuerus - "Artaḥshasta." A direct Greek rendering of Ahasuerus is used by both Josephus and the Septuagint for occurrences of the name outside the Book of Esther. Instead, the Hebrew name Ahasuerus accords with an inscription of the time that notes that Artaxerxes II was named also Aršu, understood as a shortening of Aḫšiyaršu the Babylonian rendering of the Persian Xšayārša (Xerxes), through which the Hebrew ʔaḥašwērōš (Ahasuerus) is derived. Ctesias related that Artaxerxes II was also called Arsicas which is understood as a similar shortening with the Persian suffix -ke that is applied to shortened names. Deinon related that Artaxerxes II was also called Oarses which is also understood to be derived from Xšayārša.

Another view attempts to identify him instead with Artaxerxes I (ruled 465–424 BCE), whose Babylonian concubine, Kosmartydene, was the mother of his son Darius II (ruled 424–405 BCE). Jewish tradition relates that Esther was the mother of a King Darius and so some try to identify Ahasuerus with Artaxerxes I and Esther with Kosmartydene.

Based on the view that the Ahasuerus of the Book of Tobit is identical with that of the Book of Esther, some have also identified him as Nebuchadnezzar's ally Cyaxares (ruled 625–585 BCE). In certain manuscripts of Tobit, the former is called Achiachar, which, like the Greek Cyaxares, is thought to be derived from Persian Huwaxšaθra. Depending on the interpretation of Esther 2:5–6, Mordecai or his great-grandfather Kish was carried away from Jerusalem with Jeconiah by Nebuchadnezzar, in 597 BCE. The view that it was Mordecai would be consistent with the identification of Ahasuerus with Cyaxares. Identifications with other Persian monarchs have also been suggested.

Jacob Hoschander has argued that the name of Haman and that of his father Hamedatha are mentioned by Strabo as Omanus and Anadatus, worshipped with Anahita in the city of Zela. Hoschander suggests that Haman may, if the connection is correct, be a priestly title and not a proper name. Strabo's names are unattested in Persian texts as gods; however the Talmud and Josephus interpret the description of courtiers bowing to Haman in Esther 3:2 as worship. (Other scholars assume "Omanus" refers to Vohu Mana.)

In his Historia Scholastica Petrus Comestor identified Ahasuerus (Esther 1:1) as Artaxerxes III who reconquered Egypt.

== Interpretation ==
In the Book of Esther, the Tetragrammaton does not appear, but some argue it is present, in hidden form, in four complex acrostics in Hebrew: the initial or last letters of four consecutive words, either forwards or backwards comprise YHWH. These letters were distinguished in at least three ancient Hebrew manuscripts in red. (Note: These are Est 1:20; 5:4, 13 and 7:7. Additionally, Est 7:5 there is an acrostic referring to the title of God of Exodus 3:14.)

Christine Hayes contrasts the Book of Esther with apocalyptic writings, the Book of Daniel in particular: both Esther and Daniel depict an existential threat to the Jewish people, but while Daniel commands the Jews to wait faithfully for God to resolve the crisis, in Esther the crisis is resolved entirely through human action and national solidarity. God, in fact, is not mentioned, Esther is portrayed as assimilated to Persian culture, and Jewish identity in the book is an ethnic category rather than a religious one.

This contrasts with traditional Jewish commentaries, such as the commentary of the Vilna Gaon, which states "But in every verse it discusses the great miracle. However, this miracle was in a hidden form, occurring through apparently natural processes, not like the Exodus from Egypt, which openly revealed the might of God." This follows the approach of the Talmud, which states that "(The Book of) Esther is referenced in the Torah in the verse 'And I shall surely hide (in Hebrew, 'haster astir,' related to 'Esther') My Face from them on that day.

André Lacocque also sees the Book of Esther as being fundamentally theological and that its main message was to correct the mistakes of ancestors. These mistakes included being lenient against Amalekites and plundering goods, which King Saul was guilty of. Another message was that diasporic Jews were responsible for the welfare of their host community, who held unpredictable views about Jews. These views ranged from violent antisemitism to passionate philosemitism. Lacocque compares this to Joseph's governance of Egypt in the Book of Genesis, which benefitted native Egyptians and Hebrew immigrants.

Although marriages between Jews and Gentiles are not permitted in orthodox Judaism, even in case of Pikuach nefesh, Esther is not regarded as a sinner, because she remained passive, and risked her life to save that of the entire Jewish people.

Azīz Pajand, a Persian Jew, published "Purim" in 1966, which offered an Iranophilic interpretation of the Book of Esther. Here, Haman was the Amalekite enemy of 'pure-blooded Iranians' and Jews. Thus, Purim became a holiday that celebrates salvation for all Iranians from the 'Hamanites'. He also emphasizes the role of Jewish-Persian cooperation in realizing the Book of Esther's denouement. Pajand justified his interpretation to dispel accusations that the Book of Esther was anti-Iranian and because he believed that Iranians were "travellers in the way of truth". In contrast, Haman violated the Zoroastrian ideal of "Good thoughts; Good words; and Good deeds". Lacocque likewise observes that the "enemies of the Jews" were never arbitrarily branded as Amalekites before being killed, in comparison to Haman and his sons, which discredits any motive of Jewish ultranationalism.

Albert Barnes similarly argues that the philosemitic Persian establishment was perplexed at Haman's decree (Esther 3:15), and that they were supportive of Esther's efforts against the "enemies of the Jews". The latter were mostly found "among the idolatrous people of the subject nations", whom the Persians did not care for. The ones in Susa, however, consisted of Haman's faction, led by his ten sons, and fugitives who believed they were free to kill the Jews once the latter's "privileges have expired", thus why they were killed the next day. Matthew Poole sees the subsequent hanging of Haman's sons as a cruel Jewish and Persian custom that punishes offenders for 'abusing' the king.

John Gill sees the conversion of Persian allies (Esther 8:17) as an example of 'conversion under duress' but does not discount alternative explanations. They include being impressed by the 'Divine Providence' working in the Jews' favor and seeking the favor of Esther and Mordecai, who gained immense power. But ultimately, the Persian allies and Jews celebrated Purim together and taught their children to read the Book of Esther (Esther 9:27).

According to Rabbi Mordechai Neugroschel, there is a code in the Book of Esther which lies in the names of Haman's 10 sons. Three of the Hebrew letters—a tav, a shin and a zayin—are written smaller than the rest, while a vav is written larger. The outsized vav—which represents the number six—corresponds to the sixth millennium of the world since creation, which, according to Jewish tradition, is the period between 1240 and 2240 CE. As for the tav, shin and zayin, their numerical values add up to 707. Put together, these letters refer to the Jewish year 5707, which corresponds to the secular 1946–1947. In his research, Neugroschel noticed that ten Nazi defendants in the Nuremberg Trials were executed by hanging on 16 October 1946, which was the date of the final judgement day of Judaism, Hoshana Rabbah. Additionally, Hermann Göring, an eleventh Nazi official sentenced to death, committed suicide, parallel to Haman's daughter in Tractate Megillah.

== Additions to Esther ==
An additional six chapters appear interspersed in Esther in the Septuagint, an early Greek translation of the Bible. This was noted by Jerome in compiling the Latin Vulgate. Additionally, the Greek text contains many small changes in the meaning of the main text. Jerome recognized the former as additions not present in the Hebrew Text and placed them at the end of his Latin translation. This placement is used in Catholic Bible translations based primarily on the Vulgate, such as the Douay–Rheims Bible and the Knox Bible, with chapters numbered up to 16. In contrast, the Nova Vulgata incorporates the additions to Esther directly into the narrative itself, as do most modern Catholic English translations based on the original Hebrew and Greek (e.g., Revised Standard Version Catholic Edition, New American Bible, New Revised Standard Version Catholic Edition). The numbering system for the additions therefore differs with each translation. The Nova Vulgata accounts for the additional verses by numbering them as extensions of the verses immediately following or preceding them (e.g., Esther 11:2–12 in the old Vulgate becomes Esther 1:1a–1k in the Nova Vulgata), while the NAB and its successor, the NABRE, assign letters of the alphabet as chapter headings for the additions (e.g., Esther 11:2–12:6 in the Vulgate becomes Esther A:1–17). The RSVCE and the NRSVCE place the additional material into the narrative, but retain the chapter and verse numbering of the old Vulgate.

=== Contents ===
The six passages making up the Additions to Esther are identified by letters:

- Addition A – an opening prologue that describes a dream had by Mordecai, printed ahead of chapter 1 in RSVCE.
- Addition B – the contents of the decree against the Jews, included within chapter 3 in RSVCE.
- Addition C – an extension to the dialogue between Hathach and Mordecai, placed after 4:8 in RSVCE, and prayers for God's intervention offered by Mordecai and by Esther, both included within chapter 4 in RSVCE.
- Addition D – an expansion of the scene in which Esther appears before the king, with a mention of God's intervention, included in chapter 5 in RSVCE.
- Addition E – a copy of the decree in favor of the Jews, added to chapter 8 in RSVCE.
- Addition F – a passage in which Mordecai interprets his dream (from the prologue) in terms of the events that followed, added to chapter 10 in RSVCE, and a colophon appended to the end of chapter 10, also referenced as 11:1, which reads:

In the fourth year of the reign of Ptolemy and Cleopatra, Dositheus, who said that he was a priest and a Levite, and his son Ptolemy brought to Egypt the preceding Letter about Purim, which they said was authentic and had been translated by Lysimachus son of Ptolemy, one of the residents of Jerusalem.

— (NRSV)

It is unclear to which version of Greek Esther this colophon refers, and who exactly are the figures mentioned in it.

By the time the Greek version of Esther was written, the foreign power visible on the horizon as a future threat to Judah was the kingdom of Macedonia under Alexander the Great, who defeated the Persian empire about 150 years after the time of the story of Esther; the Septuagint version noticeably calls Haman a "Bougaion" (Ancient Greek: βουγαῖον), possibly in the Homeric sense of "bully" or "braggart", whereas the Hebrew text describes him as an Agagite.

=== Canonicity ===
The canonicity of these Greek additions has been a subject of scholarly disagreement practically since their first appearance in the Septuagint. Martin Luther, being perhaps the most vocal Reformation-era critic of the work, considered even the original Hebrew version to be of very doubtful value.

The Council of Basel–Ferrara–Florence confirmed its status as canonical between 1431 and 1445.

The Council of Trent, the summation of the Counter-Reformation, reconfirmed the entire book, both Hebrew text and Greek additions, as canonical. The Book of Esther is used twice in commonly used sections of the Catholic Lectionary. In both cases, the text used is not only taken from a Greek addition. The readings also include the prayer of Mordecai, and nothing of Esther's own words is ever used. The Eastern Orthodox Church uses the Septuagint version of Esther, as it does for all of the Old Testament.

In contrast, the additions are included in the Biblical apocrypha, usually printed in a separate section (if at all) in Protestant bibles. The additions, called "The rest of the Book of Esther", are specifically listed in the Thirty-Nine Articles, Article VI, of the Church of England as non-canonical, though "read for example of life and instruction of manners".

== Modern retelling ==
Year	Type	Cast or creator	Description
1511	Painting	Michelangelo	There are several paintings depicting Esther and her story, including The Punishment of Haman by Michelangelo, in a corner of the Sistine Chapel ceiling.
1660	Painting	Rembrandt van Rijn	In 1660, Rembrandt van Rijn's painting of Esther's Banquet depicts how Esther approached the men at their level to make the request of erasing the decree.
1689	Poem	Lucrezia Tornabuoni	The Italian Renaissance poet Lucrezia Tornabuoni chose Esther as one of biblical figures on which she wrote poetry.
1689	Stageplay	Jean Baptiste Racine	Jean Baptiste Racine wrote Esther, a tragedy, at the request of Louis XIV's wife, Françoise d'Aubigné, marquise de Maintenon.
1718	Stageplay	Handel	Handel wrote the oratorio Esther based on Racine's play.
1881	Poem	Christina Rossetti	The eighth poem of 14 in Rossetti's sonnet-of-sonnets sequence Monna Innominata portrays Esther as brave, beautiful, wise and witty, as 'subtle as a snake', and the woman who 'built her people's house that it should stand'.
1947	Movie	Ottilie Kruger	A 1947 American film entitled Queen Esther: A Story from the Bible, starring Ottilie Kruger as Esther, Richard Hale as Mordecai, Addison Richards as Haman, and Charles Evans as King Xerxes.
1958	Book	Gladys Malvern	In 1958, a book entitled Behold Your Queen! was written by Gladys Malvern and illustrated by her sister, Corinne Malvern. It was chosen as a selection of the Junior Literary Guild.
1960	Stageplay	Saunders Lewis	The play entitled Esther (1960), written by Welsh dramatist Saunders Lewis, is a retelling of the story in Welsh.
1960	Movie	Joan Collins	A 1960 movie about the story, Esther and the King, starring Joan Collins.
1978	Miniseries	Victoria Principal	A 1978 miniseries entitled The Greatest Heroes of the Bible starred Victoria Principal as Esther, Robert Mandan as Xerxes, and Michael Ansara as Haman.
1979	TV movie	Olivia Hussey	A 1979 television film entitled The Thirteenth Day: The Story of Esther and aired on ABC-TV, starring Olivia Hussey as Esther, Tony Musante as King Ahasuerus, and Harris Yulin as Haman.
1981	Animation	Superbook	Episode 25 of the 1981 anime series Superbook involves this story
1983	Musical	J. Edward Oliver, Nick Munns	The 1983 musical entitled Swan Esther was written by J. Edward Oliver and Nick Munns and released as a concept album with Stephanie Lawrence and Denis Quilley. Swan Esther has been performed by the Young Vic, a national tour produced by Bill Kenwright and some amateur groups.
1986	Movie	Amos Gitai	Israeli film directed by Amos Gitai entitled Esther.
1987	Book	Tomie dePaola	Children's book titled Queen Esther written and illustrated by award-winning American author Tomie dePaola and published by HarperCollins.
1992	Animation	Helen Slater	In 1992, a 30-minute, fully animated video, twelfth in Hanna-Barbera's The Greatest Adventure series, titled Queen Esther features the voices of Helen Slater as Queen Esther, Dean Jones as King Ahasuerus, Werner Klemperer as Haman, and Ron Rifkin as Mordecai.
1999	TV movie	Louise Lombard	TV movie from the Bible Collection that follows the biblical account very closely, Esther, starred Louise Lombard in the title role and F. Murray Abraham as Mordecai.
2000	Animation	VeggieTales	VeggieTales released "Esther... The Girl Who Became Queen".
2005	Book	Ginger Garrett	Chosen: The Lost Diaries of Queen Esther by Ginger Garrett. 2005, NavPress.
2006	Movie	Tiffany Dupont, Luke Goss	A movie about Esther and Ahasuerus, entitled One Night with the King, stars Tiffany Dupont and Luke Goss. It was based on the novel Hadassah: One Night with the King by Tommy Tenney and Mark Andrew Olsen.
??	??	??	Esther is one of the five heroines of the Order of the Eastern Star.
2011	Song	Maccabeats	On March 8, 2011, the Maccabeats released a music video called "Purim Song".
2012	Book	J. T. Waldman	In 2012, a graphic adaptation of the Book of Esther was illustrated by J. T. Waldman and appeared in volume one of The Graphic Canon, edited by Russ Kick and published by Seven Stories Press.
2013	Movie	Jen Lilley	The Book of Esther is a 2013 movie starring Jen Lilley as Queen Esther and Joel Smallbone as King Xerxes.
2015	Book	Angela Hunt	Hunt, Angela Esther: Royal Beauty (A Dangerous Beauty Novel) (2015)
2016	Book	Rebecca Kanner	Kanner, Rebecca, Esther (2016)
2011	Book	Joan Wolf	Wolf, Joan, A Reluctant Queen: The Love Story of Esther (2011)
2011	Book	Roseanna M. White	White, Roseanna, M. Jewel of Persia (2011)
2020	Book	Jill Eileen Smith	Smith, Jill, Eileen. Star of Persia: Esther's Story (2020)
2013	Book	H.B. Moore	H.B. Moore. Esther the Queen (2013)
2013	Animation	Bryant Paul Richardson	Superbook S2 E5: Esther: For Such a Time as This! (2013)
2014	Movie	CJ Kramer	Megillas Lester, an animated comedy loosely based on the Book of Esther, where a boy named Daniel Lesterovich (a.k.a., "Lester") is knocked out and travels back in time to the story of the Megillah, and nearly changes history by accidentally saving Queen Vashti.
2020	Book	Elizabeth Mack	Mack, Elizabeth. The Queen of Persia (2020)
2019	Book	Diana Taylor	Taylor, Diana, Wallis. Hadassah, Queen Esther of Persia (2019)
2020	Stageplay	Sight & Sound Theatres	Sight & Sound Theatres produced Queen Esther, a stage production.

== See also ==
- Chiastic structure
- Crypteia – Covert armed youth group in ancient Sparta
- Grager – Purim noisemaker
