= Samuel Makshan =

Samuel ben Phinehas ha-Kohen Makshan (Hebrew: שמואל בן פינחס הכהן מקשן) was a 16th-century Bohemian Talmudist, born in Prague. He wrote Teḥillat divre Shmuel, commentary on the Targum of Esther (Prague, 1594), Bet din shel Shmuel (Lublin, 1606), commentary on Rashi to Esther and Ruth and on the Targum of the latter, and Yegon lev (Krakow, n.d.), commentary on Lamentations.
