= Esther in rabbinic literature =

Esther was the chief character in the Book of Esther. She is counted among the prophetesses of Israel. Allusions in rabbinic literature to the Biblical story of Esther contain various expansions, elaborations and inferences beyond the text presented in the book of the Bible.

== Rabbinic account ==
The following is briefly the story of Esther's life as elaborated by the various midrashim:

=== Family ===
A foundling or an orphan, her father dying before her birth, her mother at her birth, Esther was reared in the house of Mordecai, her first cousin, to whom, according to some accounts, she was even married. Maharal of Prague says that the circumstances of her birth were not coincidental. Alienation and loneliness are tools like any others and are given in order to enable one to become who they can be. The Maharal points out that she had an inner strength.

According to some sources, Esther was a descendant of Saul. This has special significance since Haman is descended from Agag, whom Saul temporarily spared from death against God's wishes.

=== Her name ===
Her original name was "Hadassah" (myrtle), that of "Esther" being given her by the star-worshipers, as reflecting her sweet character and the comeliness of her person.

=== Esther and Ahasuerus ===
In the Bible, King Ahasuersus of Persia banished Queen Vashti for having defied him. He then decreed that all beautiful young women be gathered to the palace from every province of his kingdom, that he might find a new wife and queen.

When the edict of the king was promulgated, and his eunuchs scoured the country in search of a new wife for the monarch, Esther hid herself so as not to be seen of men, and remained in seclusion for four years, until even God's voice urged her to repair to the king's palace, where her absence had been noticed. Her appearance among the candidates for the queen's vacant place causes a commotion, all feeling that with her charms none can compete; her rivals even make haste to adorn her. She spurned the usual resources for enhancing her beauty, so that the keeper of the harem becomes alarmed lest he be accused of neglect. He therefore showers attentions upon her, and places at her disposal riches never given to others. But she will not be tempted to use the king's goods, nor will she eat of the king's food, being a faithful Jewess; she continues her modest mode of living. When her turn comes to be ushered into the royal presence, Median and Persian women flank her on both sides, but her beauty is such that the decision in her favor is at once assured.

To the Rabbis, Esther was one of the most beautiful women ever created. Another source says Esther was yerakroket, often translated as "greenish"; but as classical Greek used the word chloros ("green") to refer to honey-like yellow and to human skin as well as what we call green, the rabbis who lived in a Greek-influenced context may have intended that Esther's skin was a normal shade of yellow.

According to the Talmud, she had seven maids, which in order to remember when it was Shabbat, she named after the days of the week. Rather than use the dehumanizing "Monday", "Tuesday", etc., she named them after the order of creation. One was "Light", another "Transcendence", etc. They all ultimately converted to Judaism.

The king has been in the habit of comparing the charms of the applicants with a picture of Vashti suspended over his couch, and up to the time when Esther approaches him none has eclipsed the beauty of his beheaded spouse. But at the sight of Esther he at once removes the picture. Esther, true to Mordecai's injunction, conceals her birth from her royal consort. Mordecai was prompted to give her this command by the desire not to win favors as Esther's cousin. The king, of course, is very desirous of learning all about her antecedents, but Esther, after vouchsafing him the information that she, too, is of princely blood, turns the conversation, by a few happy counter-questions regarding Vashti.

=== Mordecai and Esther ===
Mordecai's daily visits to the courtyard are for the purpose of ascertaining whether Esther has remained true to the precepts of her religion. She had not eaten forbidden food, preferring a diet of vegetables, and had otherwise scrupulously observed the Law. When the crisis came Mordecai—who had, by his refusal to bow to Haman or, rather, to the image of an idol ostentatiously displayed on his breast, brought calamity upon the Jews—appeared in his mourning garments, and Esther, frightened, gave birth to a still-born child. To avoid gossip she sent Hatach instead of going herself to ascertain the cause of the trouble. This Hatach was afterward met by Haman and slain. Still Mordecai had been able to tell Hatach his dream, that Esther would be the little rill of water separating the two fighting monsters, and that the rill would grow to be a large stream flooding the earth.

The rabbis struggled with the idea of why God would allow Haman to threaten the Jews with destruction. R. Shimon b. Yohai said that it was because, unlike Shadrach, Meshach, and Abednego, they had bowed down to Nebuchadnezzar's idol. However, he explained that since they did not mean to show devotion, but acted only for appearances sake, so God decreed only the apparent destruction of the Jews, but would not permit Haman to carry it out.

A second reason draws a distinction between Daniel, who abstained from Nebuchadnezzar's table and the Jews (with the exception of Mordecai), who attended Ahasuerus' banquet in Chapter 1.

=== Esther before Ahasuerus ===
Mordecai called upon her to pray for her people and then intercede with the king. Though Pesaḥ was near, and the provision of Megillat Ta'anit forbidding fasting during this time could not be observed without disregarding Mordecai's plea, she overcame her cousin's scruples by a very apt counter-question, and at her request all the Jews "that had on that day already partaken of food" observed a rigid fast, in spite of the feast-day, while Mordecai prayed and summoned the children and obliged even them to abstain from food. On the third day, with serene mien she passed on to the inner court, arraying herself in her best, and taking her two maids, upon one of whom, according to court etiquette, she leaned, while the other carried her train. Ahasuerus attempted to ignore her, and turned his face away, but an angel forced him to look at her. She, however, fainted at the sight of his flushed face and burning eyes, and leaned her head on her handmaid, expecting to hear her doom pronounced; but God increased her beauty to such an extent that Ahasuerus could not resist. Why Haman was invited the Rabbis explain in various ways. She desired to make the king jealous by playing the lover to Haman, which she did at the feast, planning to have him killed even though she should share his fate. At the supreme moment, when she denounced Haman, it was an angel that threw Haman on the couch, though he intended to kneel before the queen; so that the king, suspecting an attempt upon the virtue and life of his queen, forthwith ordered him to be hanged.

=== Esther's status ===
She remained eternally young; when she married Ahasuerus she was at least forty years of age, or even, according to some, eighty years based on the numerical value of Hadassah, her Hebrew name. She is also counted among the prophetesses of Israel.

== The sources ==
The story of Esther—typical in many regards of the perennial fate of the Jews, and recalled even more vividly by their daily experience than by the annual reading of the Megillah at Purim—invited, both by the brevity of some parts of the narrative and by the associations of its events with the bitter lot of Israel, amplifications readily supplied by popular fancy and the artificial interpretation of Biblical verse. The rabbis saw the story off Esther as yet another retelling of the abiding conflict between Israel and Amalek, and in that way found it canonical.

The following post-Biblical writings have to be considered:

- Targum Rishon, also known as the First Targum of Esther. The Antwerp and Paris polyglots give a different and longer text than the London. The best edition is by De Lagarde (reprinted from the first Venice Bible) in "Hagiographa Chaldaice," Leipsic, 1873. The date of the first Targum is about 700 (see S. Posner, "Das Targum Rishon," Breslau, 1896).
- Targum Sheni, also known as the Second Targum of Esther, containing material not germane to the Esther story. This may be characterized as a genuine and exuberant midrash. Edited by De Lagarde (in "Hagiographa Chaldaice," Berlin, 1873) and by P. Cassel ("Aus Literatur und Geschichte," Berlin and Leipsic, 1885, and "Das Buch Esther," Berlin, 1891, Ger. transl.).
- Yosippon (beginning of 10th century; see Zunz, "G. V." pp. 264 et seq.).
- Midrash Rabbah to Esther (probably 11th century).
- Midrash Abba Gorion (Buber, l.c.; Jellinek, "B. H." i. 1-18).
- Midrash Tehillim to Psalm 22.
- Midrash Megillat Esther (ed. by Horwitz in his "Sammlung Kleiner Midrashim," Berlin, 1881).
- Ḥelma de Mordekai (Aramaic: Jellinek, "B. H." v. 1–8; De Lagarde, l.c. pp. 362–365; Ad. Merx, "Chrestomathia Targumica," 1888, pp. 154 et seq.).
- Yalkut Shimoni to Esther.
