= Tetzaveh =

20th weekly Torah portion in the annual Jewish cycle of Torah reading

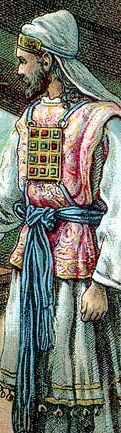
The High Priest (illustration from a Bible card published 1907 by the Providence Lithograph Company)

Tetzaveh, Tetsaveh, T'tzaveh, or T'tzavveh (Hebrew: תְּצַוֶּה, romanized: Təṣavve, lit. '[you] shall command', the second word and first distinctive word in the parashah) is the 20th weekly Torah portion (פָּרָשָׁה, parashah) in the annual Jewish cycle of Torah reading and the eighth in the Book of Exodus. The parashah reports God's commands to bring olive oil for the lamp (מְנוֹרָה, Menorah), make sacred garments for the priests (כֹּהֲנִים, kohanim), conduct an ordination ceremony, and make an incense altar.

It constitutes Exodus 27:20–30:10. The parashah is made up of 5430 Hebrew letters, 1412 Hebrew words, 101 verses, and 179 lines in a Torah scroll. Jews read it the 20th Shabbat after Simchat Torah, in February or March.

== Readings ==
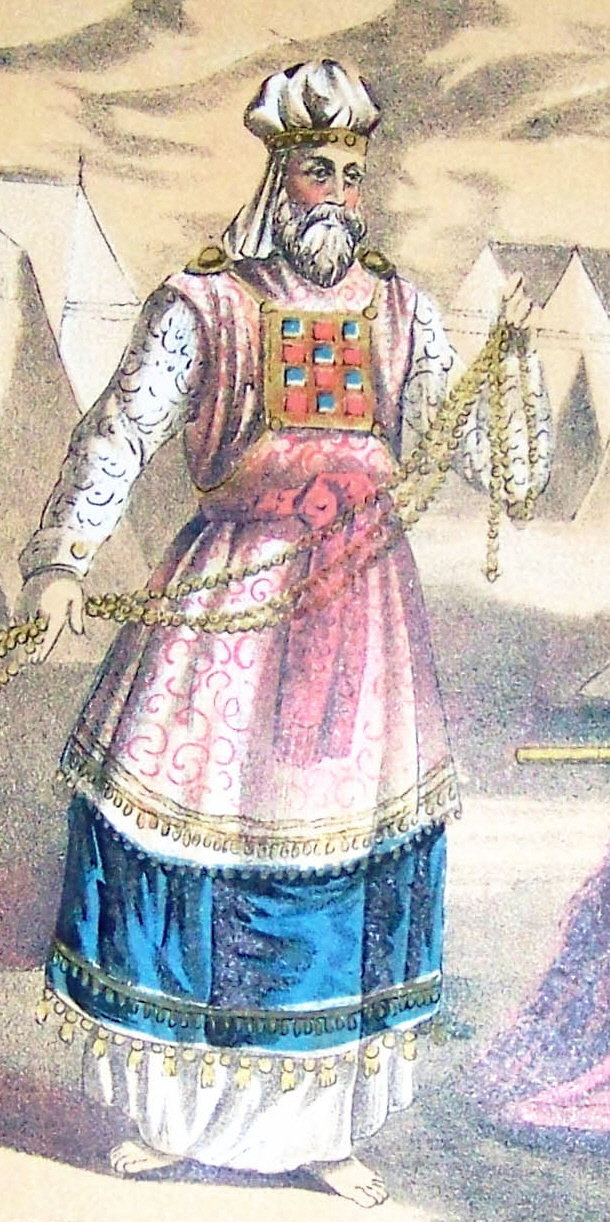
The High Priest of Israel (illustration from the 1890 Holman Bible)

In traditional Sabbath Torah reading, the parashah is divided into seven readings, or עליות, aliyot.

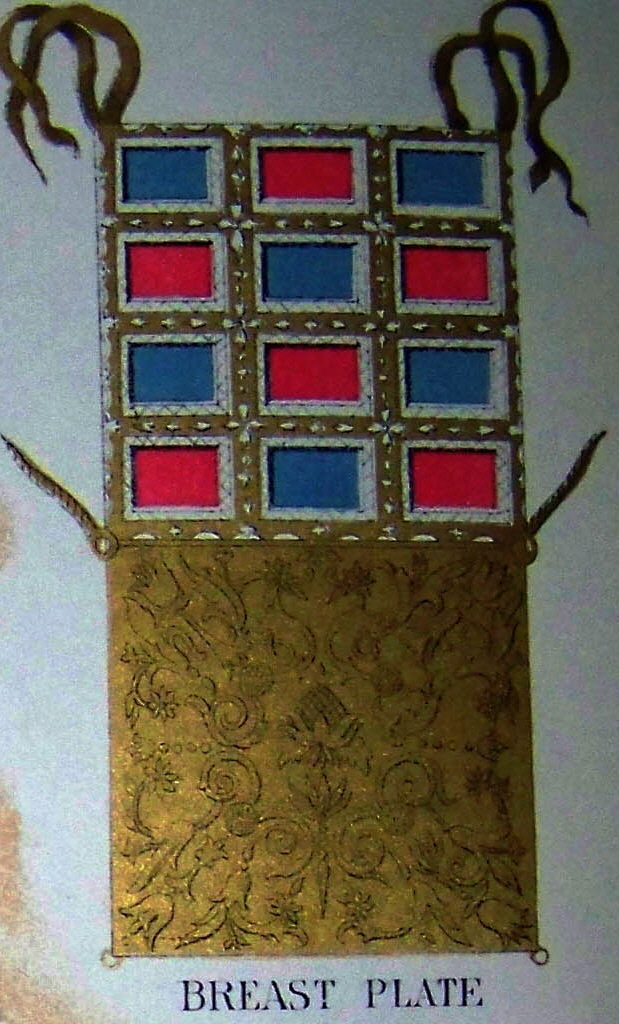
The High Priest's Breast Plate (illustration from the 1890 Holman Bible)

=== First reading—Exodus 27:20–28:12 ===
In the first reading, God instructed the Israelites to bring Moses clear olive oil, so that Aaron and his descendants as High Priest could kindle lamps regularly in the Tabernacle. God instructed Moses to make sacral vestments for Aaron: a breastpiece (חֹשֶׁן, Ḥoshen), the Ephod (אֵפוֹד), a robe, a gold frontlet inscribed "holy to the Lord," a fringed tunic, a headdress, a sash, and linen breeches.

=== Second reading—Exodus 28:13–30 ===
In the second reading, God detailed the instructions for the breastpiece. God instructed Moses to place Urim and Thummim inside the breastpiece of decision.

=== Third reading—Exodus 28:31–43 ===
In the third reading, God detailed the instructions for the robe, frontlet, fringed tunic, headdress, sash, and breeches. God instructed Moses to place pomegranates and gold bells around the robe's hem, to make a sound when the High Priest entered and exited the sanctuary, so that he would not die.

=== Fourth reading—Exodus 29:1–18 ===
In the fourth reading, God laid out an ordination ceremony for priests involving the sacrifice of a young bull, two rams, unleavened bread, unleavened cakes with oil mixed in, and unleavened wafers spread with oil. God instructed Moses to lead the bull to the front of the Tabernacle, let Aaron and his sons lay their hands upon the bull's head, slaughter the bull at the entrance of the Tent, and put some of the bull's blood on the horns of the altar. God instructed Moses to let Aaron and his sons lay their hands upon the first ram and slaughter it, sprinkle its blood, and dissect it.

=== Fifth reading—Exodus 29:19–37 ===
In the fifth reading, God instructed Moses to take one of the rams, let Aaron and his sons lay their hands upon the ram's head, slaughter the ram, and put some of its blood and on the ridge of Aaron's right ear and on the ridges of his sons' right ears, and on the thumbs of their right hands, and on the big toes of their right feet.

=== Sixth reading—Exodus 29:38–46 ===
In the sixth reading, God promised to meet and speak with Moses and the Israelites there, to abide among the Israelites, and be their God.

=== Seventh reading—Exodus 30:1–10 ===
In the seventh reading, God instructed Moses to make an incense altar of acacia wood overlaid with gold—sometimes called the Golden Altar.

=== Readings according to the triennial cycle ===
Jews who read the Torah according to the triennial cycle of Torah reading read the parashah according to the following schedule:

	Year 1	Year 2	Year 3
	2023, 2026, 2029 . . .	2024, 2027, 2030 . . .	2025, 2028, 2031 . . .
Reading	27:20–28:30	28:31–29:18	29:19–30:10
1	27:20–28:5	28:31–35	29:19–21
2	28:6–9	28:36–38	29:22–25
3	28:10–12	28:39–43	29:26–30
4	28:13–17	29:1–4	29:31–34
5	28:18–21	29:5–9	29:35–37
6	28:22–25	29:10–14	29:38–46
7	28:26–30	29:15–18	30:1–10
Maftir	28:28–30	29:15–18	30:8–10

== In inner-Biblical interpretation ==
The parashah has parallels or is discussed in these Biblical sources:

=== Exodus chapters 25–39 ===
This is the pattern of instruction and construction of the Tabernacle and its furnishings:

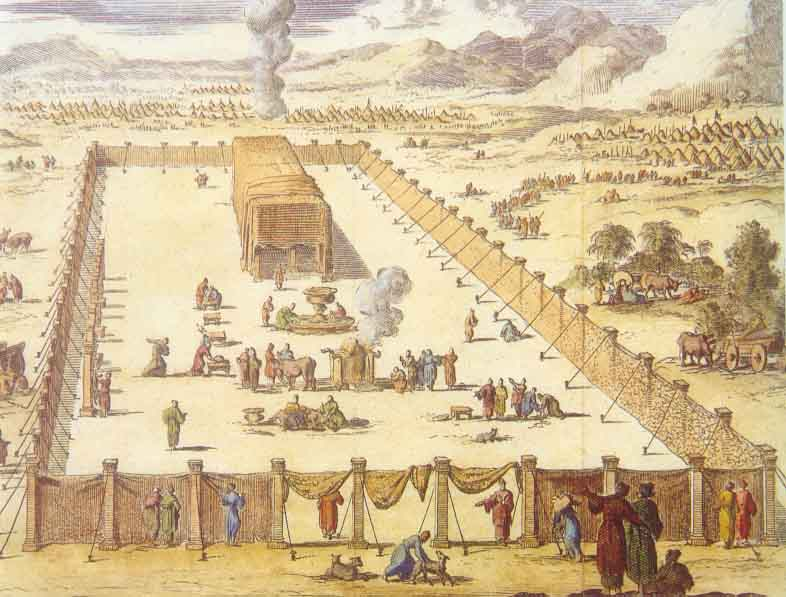
The Tabernacle

Item	Instruction		Construction	
Item	Order	Verses	Order	Verses
Contributions	1	Exodus 25:1–9	2	Exodus 35:4–29
Ark	2	Exodus 25:10–22	5	Exodus 37:1–9
Table	3	Exodus 25:23–30	6	Exodus 37:10–16
Menorah	4	Exodus 25:31–40	7	Exodus 37:17–24
Tabernacle	5	Exodus 26:1–37	4	Exodus 36:8–38
Altar of Sacrifice	6	Exodus 27:1–8	11	Exodus 38:1–7
Tabernacle Court	7	Exodus 27:9–19	13	Exodus 38:9–20
Lamp	8	Exodus 27:20–21	16	Numbers 8:1–4
Priestly Garments	9	Exodus 28:1–43	14	Exodus 39:1–31
Ordination Ritual	10	Exodus 29:1–46	15	Leviticus 8:1–9:24
Altar of Incense	11	Exodus 30:1–10	8	Exodus 37:25–28
Laver	12	Exodus 30:17–21	12	Exodus 38:8
Anointing Oil	13	Exodus 30:22–33	9	Exodus 37:29
Incense	14	Exodus 30:34–38	10	Exodus 37:29
Craftspeople	15	Exodus 31:1–11	3	Exodus 35:30–36:7
The Sabbath	16	Exodus 31:12–17	1	Exodus 35:1–3

The Priestly story of the Tabernacle in Exodus 25–27 echoes the Priestly story of creation in Genesis 1:1–2:3. As the creation story unfolds in seven days, the instructions about the Tabernacle unfold in seven speeches. In both creation and Tabernacle accounts, the text notes the completion of the task. In both creation and Tabernacle, the work done is seen to be good. In both creation and Tabernacle, when the work is finished, God takes an action in acknowledgement. In both creation and Tabernacle, when the work is finished, a blessing is invoked. And in both creation and Tabernacle, God declares something "holy."

The language used to describe the building of the Tabernacle parallels that used in the story of creation. The lampstand held seven candles, Aaron wore seven sacral vestments, the account of the building of the Tabernacle alludes to the creation account, and the Tabernacle was completed on New Year's Day. Exodus 25:1–9 and 35:4–29 list seven kinds of substances—metals, yarn, skins, wood, oil, spices, and gemstones—signifying the totality of supplies.

=== Exodus chapter 27 ===
Leviticus 24:1–4 echoes and expands on the command of Exodus 27:20 about the care of the Menorah.

=== Exodus chapter 28 ===
The priestly garments of Exodus 28:2–43 are echoed in Psalm 132:9, where the Psalmist exhorts, "Let Your priests be clothed with righteousness," and in Psalm 132:16, where God promises, "Her priests also will I clothe with salvation." Franz Delitzsch interpreted this to mean that the priests would be characterized by conduct that accorded with God's will, and that the priests would not merely bring about salvation instrumentally, but personally possess it and proclaim it in their whole outward appearance.

The Hebrew Bible refers to the Urim and Thummim in Exodus 28:30; Leviticus 8:8; Numbers 27:21; Deuteronomy 33:8; 1 Samuel 14:41 ("Thammim") and 28:6; Ezra 2:63; and Nehemiah 7:65; and may refer to them in references to "sacred utensils" in Numbers 31:6 and the Ephod in 1 Samuel 14:3 and 19; 23:6 and 9; and 30:7–8; and Hosea 3:4.

=== Exodus chapter 29 ===
The Torah mentions the combination of ear, thumb, and toe in three places. In Exodus 29:20, God instructed Moses how to initiate the priests, telling him to kill a ram, take some of its blood, and put it on the tip of the right ear of Aaron and his sons, on the thumb of their right hand, and on the great toe of their right foot, and dash the remaining blood against the altar round about. And then Leviticus 8:23–24 reports that Moses followed God's instructions to initiate Aaron and his sons. Then, Leviticus 14:14, 17, 25, and 28 set forth a similar procedure for the cleansing of a person with skin disease (צָּרַעַת, tzara'at). In Leviticus 14:14, God instructed the priest on the day of the person's cleansing to take some of the blood of a guilt-offering and put it upon the tip of the right ear, the thumb of the right hand, and the great toe of the right foot of the one to be cleansed. And then in Leviticus 14:17, God instructed the priest to put oil on the tip of the right ear, the thumb of the right hand, and the great toe of the right foot of the one to be cleansed, on top of the blood of the guilt-offering. And finally, in Leviticus 14:25 and 28, God instructed the priest to repeat the procedure on the eighth day to complete the person's cleansing.

=== Exodus chapter 30 ===
In its description of the altar, Exodus 30:10 foreshadows the purpose of Yom Kippur summarized in Leviticus 16:6, 16, and 30–34 and echoed in Leviticus 23:27–28 in the listing of the Festivals.

== In early nonrabbinic interpretation ==
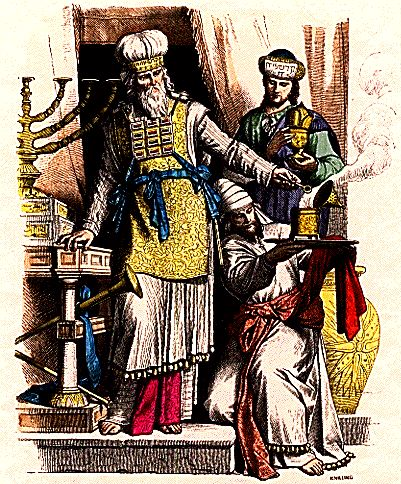
The High Priest wearing his breastplate (illustration circa 1861–1880 from The History of Costume by Braun and Schneider)

The parashah is discussed in these early nonrabbinic sources:

=== Exodus chapter 28 ===
Ben Sira wrote of the splendor of the High Priest's garments in Exodus 28, saying, "How glorious he was . . . as he came out of the House of the curtain. Like the morning star among the clouds, like the full moon at the festal season; like the sun shining on the Temple of the Most High, like the rainbow gleaming in splendid clouds."

Josephus interpreted the linen vestment of Exodus 28:5 to signify the earth, as flax grows out of the earth. Josephus interpreted the Ephod of the four colors gold, blue, purple, and scarlet in Exodus 28:6 to signify that God made the universe of four elements, with the gold interwoven to show the splendor by which all things are enlightened. Josephus saw the stones on the High Priest's shoulders in Exodus 28:9–12 to represent the sun and the moon. He interpreted the breastplate of Exodus 28:15–22 to resemble the earth, having the middle place of the world, and the girdle that encompassed the High Priest to signify the ocean, which encircled the world. He interpreted the 12 stones of the Ephod in Exodus 28:17–21 to represent the months or the signs of the Zodiac. He interpreted the golden bells and pomegranates that Exodus 28:33–35 says hung on the fringes of the High Priest's garments to signify thunder and lightning, respectively. And Josephus saw the blue on the headdress of Exodus 28:37 to represent Heaven, "for how otherwise could the name of God be inscribed upon it?"

Josephus told that when Alexander the Great saw from a distance the multitude of priests in white linen garments and the High Priest in purple and scarlet clothing with the golden plate on his head, Alexander saluted the High Priest, recalling that he had seen him in a vision.

Josephus reported that the Urim and Thumin stopped shining 200 years before his day, as God had become displeased with the transgressions of God's law.

=== Exodus chapter 29 ===
Philo taught that the command of Exodus 29:20 to apply ram's blood to the priests' right ear, thumb, and great toe signified that the perfect person must be pure in every word, action, and life. The ear symbolizes the hearing with which people judge one's words, the hand symbolizes action, and the foot symbolizes the way in which a person walks in life. And since each of these is an extremity of the right side of the body, Philo imagined that Exodus 29:20 teaches that one should labor to attain improvement in everything with dexterity and felicity, as an archer aims at a target.

== In classical rabbinic interpretation ==
The parashah is discussed in these rabbinic sources from the era of the Mishnah and the Talmud:

=== Exodus chapter 27 ===
A midrash taught that God considers studying the sanctuary's structure equivalent to rebuilding it.

Rabbi Josiah taught that the expression "they shall take for you" (וְיִקְחוּ אֵלֶיךָ, v'yikhu eileicha) in Exodus 27:20 was a command for Moses to take from communal funds, in contrast to the expression "make for yourself" (עֲשֵׂה לְךָ, aseih lecha) in Numbers 10:2, which was a command for Moses to take from his own funds.

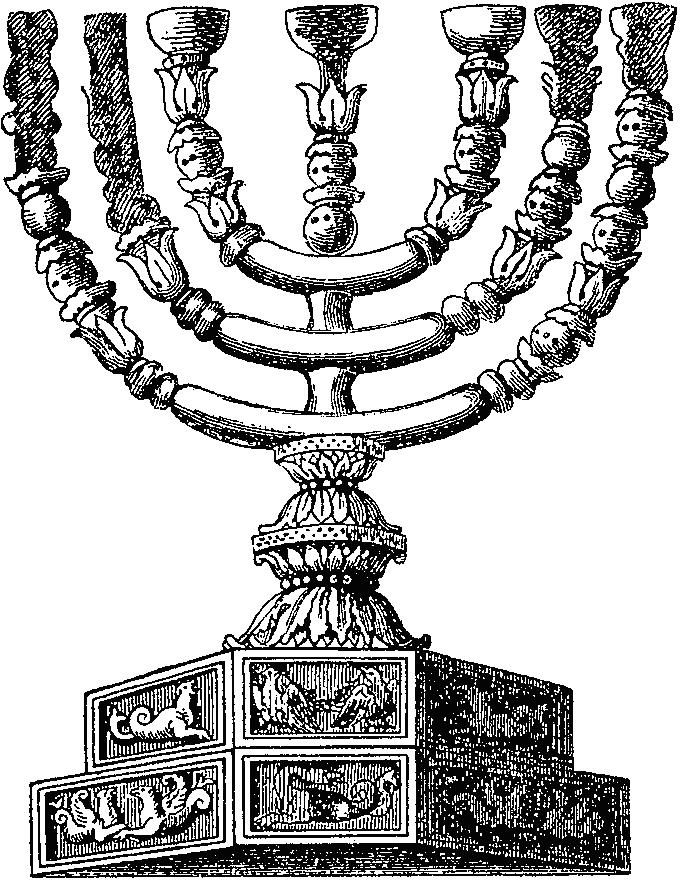
Menorah from the Arch of Titus (illustration from the 1906 Jewish Encyclopedia)

The Mishnah posited that one could have inferred that meal offerings would require the purest olive oil, for if the Menorah, whose oil was not eaten, required pure olive oil, how much more so should meal offerings, whose oil was eaten? But Exodus 27:20 states, "pure olive oil beaten for the light," but not "pure olive oil beaten for meal-offerings," to make clear that such purity was required only for the Menorah and not for meal offerings. The Mishnah taught that there were three harvests of olives, and each crop gave three kinds of oil (for a total of nine types of oil). The first crop of olives was picked from the top of the tree; they were pounded and put into a basket (Rabbi Judah said around the inside of the basket) to yield the first oil. The olives were then pressed beneath a beam (Rabbi Judah said with stones) to yield the second oil. The olives were then ground and pressed again to yield the third oil. Only the first oil was fit for the Menorah, while the second and third were for meal offerings. The second crop is when the olives at the roof level were picked from the tree; they were pounded and put into the basket (Rabbi Judah said around the inside of the basket) to yield the first oil (of the second crop). The olives were then pressed with the beam (Rabbi Judah said with stones) to yield the second oil (of the second crop). The olives were then ground and pressed again to yield the third oil. Once again, with the second crop, only the first oil was fit for the Menorah, while the second and third were for meal offerings. The third crop was when the last olives of the tree were packed in a vat until they became overripe. These olives were then taken up and dried on the roof, pounded, and put into the basket (Rabbi Judah said they were around the inside of the basket) to yield the first oil. The olives were next pressed with the beam (Rabbi Judah said with stones) to yield the second oil. And then they were ground and pressed again to yield the third oil. Once again, with the third crop, only the first oil was fit for the Menorah, while the second and third were for meal offerings.

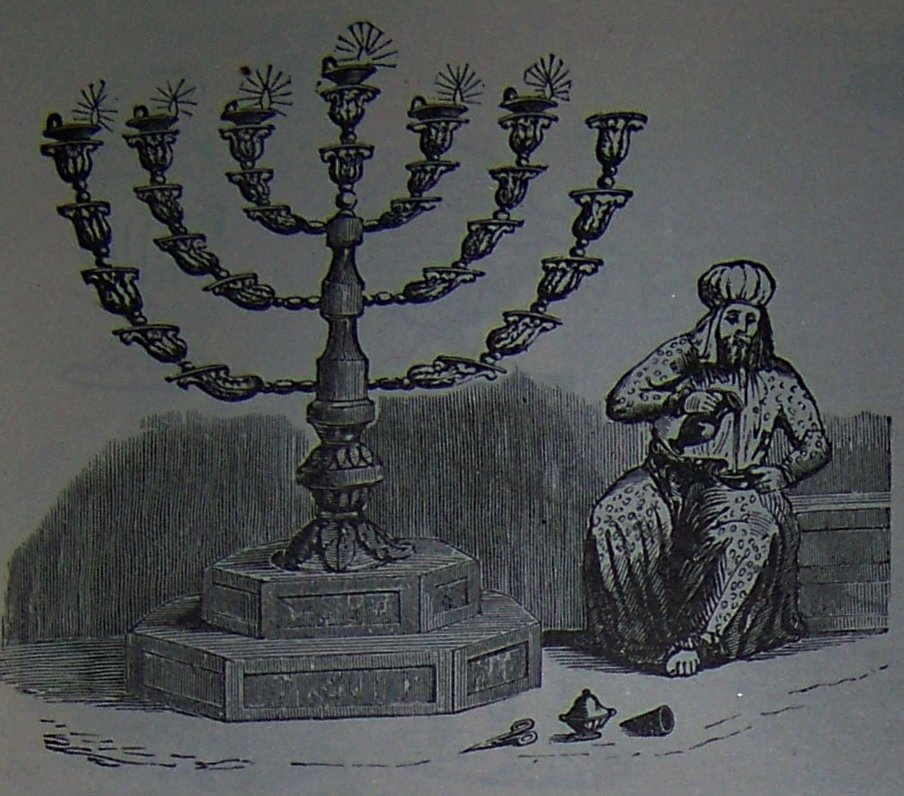
The Golden Lamp-Bearer (illustration from the 1890 Holman Bible)

The Mishnah taught that there was a stone in front of the Menorah with three steps on which the priest stood to trim the lights. The priest left the oil jar on the second step.

A midrash taught that the lights of the Tabernacle Menorah were replicas of the heavenly lights. The midrash taught that everything God created in heaven has a replica on earth. Thus Daniel 2:22 reports, "And the light dwells with [God]" in heaven. While below on earth, Exodus 27:20 directs, "That they bring to you pure olive-oil beaten for the light." (Thus, since all that is above is also below, God dwells on earth just as God dwells in heaven.) The Midrash taught that God holds the things below dearer than those above, for God left the things in heaven to descend to dwell among those below, as Exodus 25:8 reports, "And let them make Me a sanctuary, that I may dwell among them."

Citing Exodus 27:20, the Gemara taught that seeing olive oil in a dream portends seeing the light of Torah.

A midrash expounded on Exodus 27:20 to explain why Israel was, in the words of Jeremiah 11:16, like "a leafy olive tree." The midrash taught that just as the olive is beaten, ground, tied up with ropes, and then at last it yields its oil, so the nations beat, imprisoned, bound, and surrounded Israel, and when at last Israel repents of its sins, God answers it. The midrash offered a second explanation: Just as all liquids commingle one with the other, but oil refuses to do so, so Israel keeps itself distinct, as it is commanded in Deuteronomy 7:3. The midrash offered a third explanation: Just as oil floats to the top even after it has been mixed with every kind of liquid, so Israel, as long as it performs the will of God, will be set on high by God, as it says in Deuteronomy 28:1. The midrash offered a fourth explanation: Just as oil gives forth light, so did the Temple in Jerusalem give light to the whole world, as it says in Isaiah 60:3.

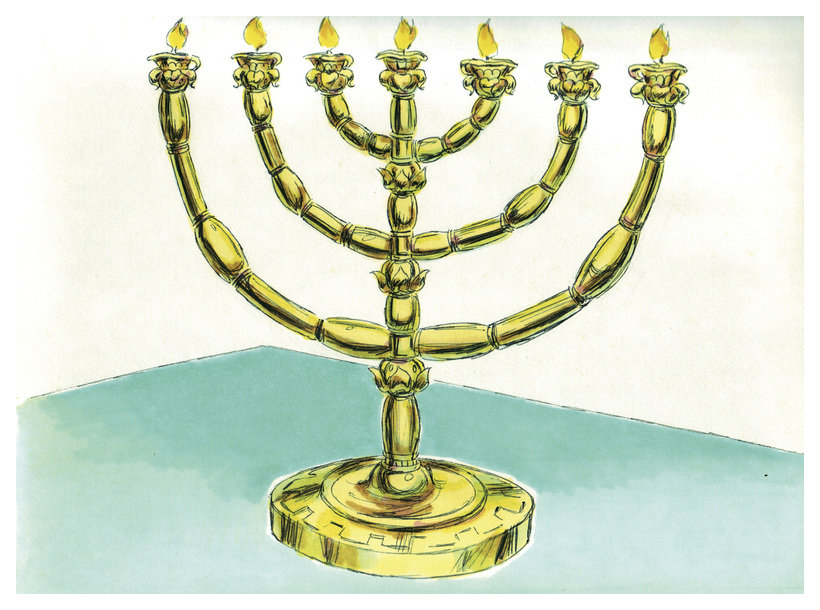
The golden lampstand (1984 illustration by Jim Padgett, courtesy of Distant Shores Media/Sweet Publishing)

A midrash taught that God instructed Moses to cause a lamp to burn in the Tabernacle not because God needed the light, but so that the Israelites could give light to God as God gave light to the Israelites. The midrash likened this to the case of a man who could see, walking along with a blind man. The seeing man offered to guide the blind man. When they came home, the seeing man asked the blind man to kindle a lamp for him and illumine his path so that the blind man would no longer be obliged to the seeing man for having accompanied the blind man on the way. The seeing man of the story is God, for 2 Chronicles 16:9 and Zechariah 4:10 say, "For the eyes of the Lord run to and fro throughout the whole earth." And the blind man is Israel, as Isaiah 59:10 says, "We grope for the wall like the blind, yea, as they that have no eyes do we grope; we stumble at noonday as in the twilight" (and the Israelites stumbled in the matter of the Golden Calf at midday). God illumined the way for the Israelites (after they stumbled with the Calf) and led them, as Exodus 13:21 says, "And the Lord went before them by day." When the Israelites were about to construct the Tabernacle, God called Moses and asked him in Exodus 27:20, "That they bring to you pure olive oil."

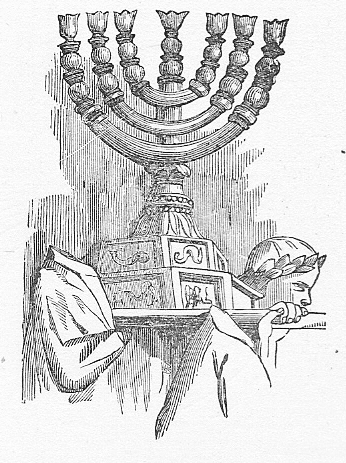
The Golden Candlestick (illustration from the 1911 Illustrated History of the Bible by John Kitto)

Another midrash taught that the words of the Torah give light to those who study them, but those who do not occupy themselves with the Torah stumble. The midrash compared this to those who stand in the dark; as soon as they start walking, they stumble, fall, and knock their face on the ground—all because they have no lamp in their hand. It is the same with those who have no Torah; they strike against sin, stumble, and die. The midrash further taught that those who study the Torah give forth light wherever they may be. Quoting Psalm 119:105, "Your word is a lamp to my feet, and a light to my path," and Proverbs 20:27, "The spirit of man is the lamp of the Lord," the midrash taught that God offers people to let God's lamp (the Torah) be in their hand, and their lamp (their souls) be in God's hand. The lamp of God is the Torah, as Proverbs 6:23 says, "For the commandment is a lamp, and the teaching is light." The commandment is "a lamp" because those who perform a commandment kindle a light before God and revive their souls; as Proverbs 20:27 says, "The spirit of man is the lamp of the Lord."

A baraita taught that they used the High Priest's worn-out trousers to make the Temple Menorah wicks and ordinary priests' worn-out trousers for candelabra outside the Temple. Reading the words "to cause a lamp to burn continually" in Exodus 27:20, Rabbi Samuel bar Isaac deduced that the unusual word לְהַעֲלֹת, lehaalot, literally "to cause to ascend," meant that the wick had to allow the flame to ascend by itself. Thus, the Rabbis concluded that no material other than flax—as in the fine linen of the High Priest's clothing—would allow the flame to ascend by itself. Similarly, Rami bar Hama deduced from the use of word לְהַעֲלֹת, lehaalot, in Exodus 27:20 that the Menorah flame had to ascend by itself, and not through other means (such as adjustment by the priests). Thus, Rami bar Hama taught that with the wicks and oil that the Sages taught, one could not light on the Sabbath, and one could also not light in the Temple. The Gemara challenged Rami bar Hama, however, citing a Mishnah that taught that the worn-out breeches and girdles of priests were torn and used to kindle the lights for the celebration of the Water-Drawing. The Gemara posited that perhaps that celebration was different. The Gemara countered with the teaching of Rabbah bar Masnah, who taught that worn-out priestly garments were torn and made into wicks for the Temple. And the Gemara clarified that the linen garments were meant.

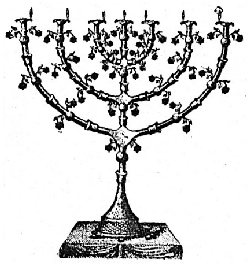
The Menorah (illustration from the 1901 A Brief Sketch of the Jewish Tabernacle by Philip Y. Pendleton)

A baraita taught that Exodus 27:21, “Aaron and his sons shall set it in order, to burn from evening to morning,” means that God instructed them to provide the Menorah with the requisite amount of oil to burn from evening to morning. And the Sages calculated that a half-log of oil (roughly 5 ounces) would burn from evening to morning. The Gemara reported that some said that they calculated this by reducing the original quantity of oil, first filling each lamp with a large quantity of oil and finding in the morning that there was still oil in the lamp, gradually reducing the quantity until they arrived at a half-log. Others said that they calculated it by increasing it, first filling the lamp with a small quantity of oil and the next evening increasing the quantity of oil until they arrived at the standard of the half-log. Those who said that they calculated it by increasing the quantity of oil said that the Torah has consideration for the Israelites' resources and to calculate by using the larger quantity of oil in the first instance wasted the oil that was still in the lamp in the morning. And those who said that they calculated it by reducing it noted that there was no stinting in the place of wealth, the Sanctuary.

The baraita reported that another interpretation held that Exodus 27:21 taught that no other service was valid from evening to morning apart from kindling the Menorah. Exodus 27:21 says: “Aaron and his sons shall set it in order, to burn from evening to morning,” and this implies that “it”—and no other thing—shall be from evening to morning. Thus, the Gemara concluded that nothing may come after the kindling of the lights, and consequently, the slaughtering of the Passover offering must happen before. The Gemara likened the burning of incense to the kindling of the Menorah, holding that just as no service could follow lighting the Menorah, so no service could follow burning the incense. And because the Gemara likened the burning of incense to the kindling of the Menorah, it also concluded that just as at the time of the Menorah lighting, there was a burning of incense; similarly, at the time of the cleaning of the Menorah, there was also a burning of incense.

=== Exodus chapter 28 ===
In Exodus 28:1, God chose Aaron and his sons to minister to God in the priest's office. Hillel taught that Aaron loved peace, pursued peace, loved his fellow creatures, and brought them closer to the Torah. Rabbi Simeon ben Yoḥai taught that because Aaron was, in the words of Exodus 4:14, "glad in his heart" over the success of Moses, in the words of Exodus 28:30, "the breastplate of judgment the Urim and the Thummim . . . shall be upon Aaron's heart." Rabbi Simeon ben Yoḥai said there are three crowns—the crown of kingship, the crown of priesthood, and the crown of Torah. The crown of the Torah is superior to all of them. If people acquire the Torah, it is as though they acquire all three crowns.

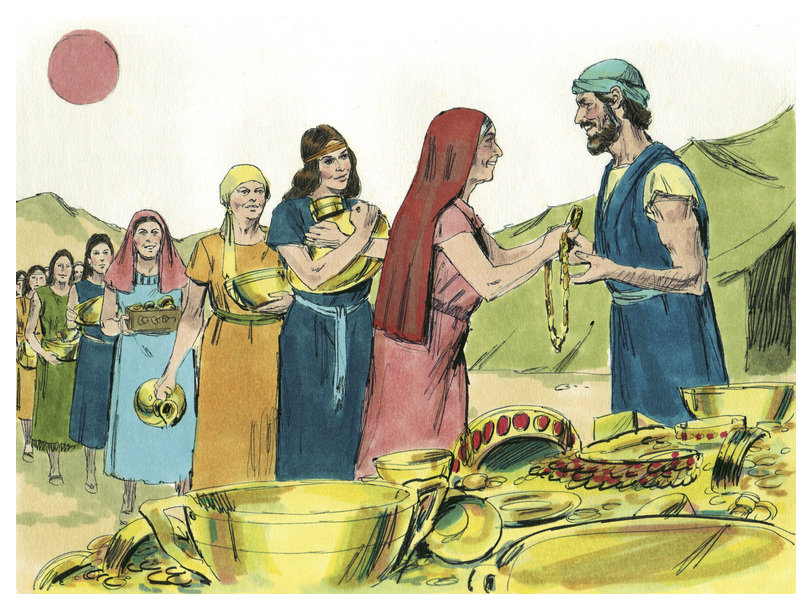
Aaron had them bring all their gold to him. (1984 illustration by Jim Padgett, courtesy of Distant Shores Media/Sweet Publishing)

Interpreting God's command in Exodus 28:1, the Sages said that when Moses came down from Mount Sinai, he saw Aaron beating the Golden Calf into shape with a hammer. Aaron really intended to delay the people until Moses came down, but Moses thought that Aaron was participating in the sin and was incensed with him. So God told Moses that God knew that Aaron's intentions were good. The midrash compared it to a prince who became mentally unstable and started digging to undermine his father's house. His tutor told him not to weary himself but to let him dig. When the king saw it, he said he knew the tutor's intentions were good and declared that the tutor would rule over the palace. Similarly, when the Israelites told Aaron in Exodus 32:1, "Make us a god," Aaron replied in Exodus 32:1, "Break off the golden rings that are in the ears of your wives, of your sons, and of your daughters, and bring them to me." Aaron told them that since he was a priest, they should let him make it and sacrifice it to delay them until Moses could come down. So God told Aaron that God knew Aaron's intention and that only Aaron would have sovereignty over the sacrifices the Israelites would bring. Hence, in Exodus 28:1, God told Moses, "And bring near Aaron your brother, and his sons with him, from among the children of Israel, that they may minister to Me in the priest's office." The midrash told that God told Moses several months later in the Tabernacle when Moses was about to consecrate Aaron to his office. Rabbi Levi compared it to the friend of a king, a member of the imperial cabinet, and a judge. When the king was about to appoint a palace governor, he told his friend that he intended to appoint the friend's brother. So God made Moses superintendent of the palace, as Numbers 7:7 reports, "My servant Moses is . . . is trusted in all My house," and God made Moses a judge, as Exodus 18:13 reports, "Moses sat to judge the people." And when God was about to appoint a High Priest, God notified Moses that it would be his brother Aaron.

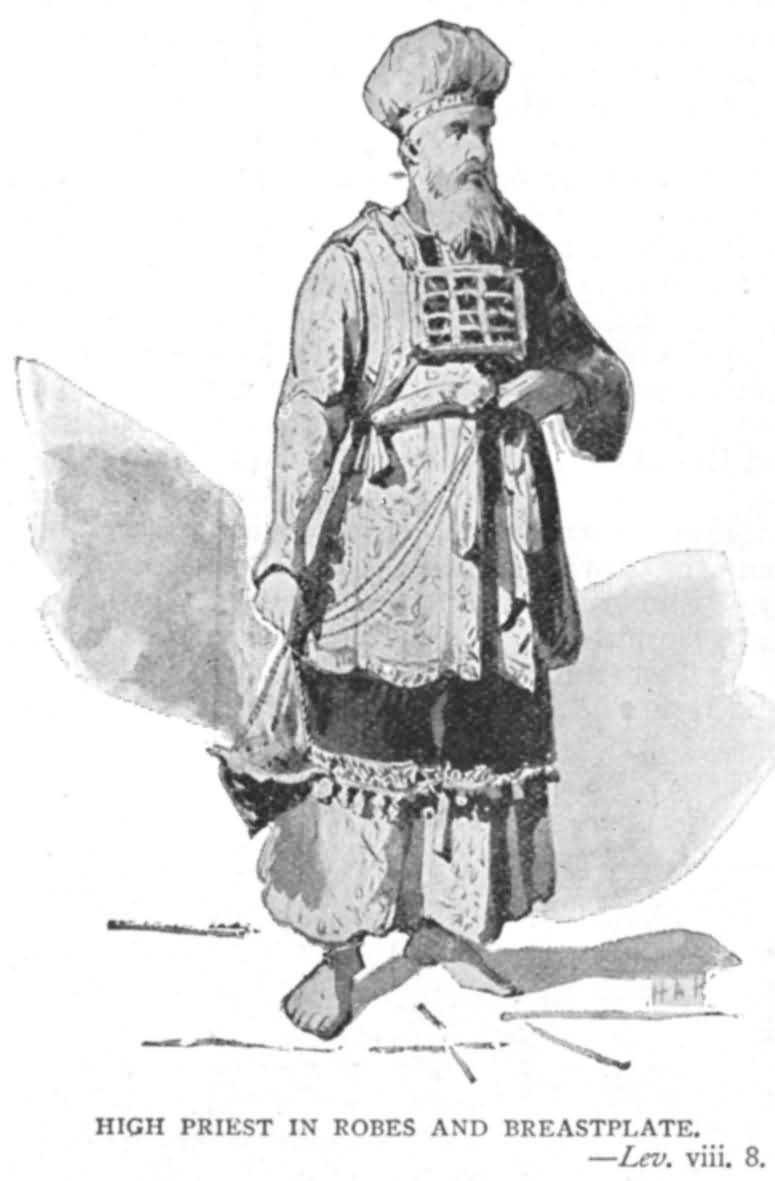
High Priest in Robes and Breastplate (the chain censer is anachronistic)

The Mishnah summarized the priestly garments described in Exodus 28, saying that "the High Priest performs the service in eight garments, and the common priest in four: in tunic, drawers, miter, and girdle. The High Priest adds to those the breastplate, the apron, the robe, and the frontlet. And the High Priest wore these eight garments when he inquired of the Urim and Thummim.

Rabbi Joḥanan called his garments "my honor." Rabbi Aha bar Abba said in Rabbi Joḥanan's name that Leviticus 6:4, "And he shall put off his garments, and put on other garments," teaches that a change of garments is an act of honor in the Torah. And the School of Rabbi Ishmael taught that the Torah teaches us manners: In the garments in which one cooked a dish for one's master, one should not pour a cup of wine. Rabbi Hiyya bar Abba said in Rabbi Joḥanan's name that it is a disgrace for a scholar to go into the marketplace with patched shoes. The Gemara objected that Rabbi Aha bar Ḥanina went out that way; Rabbi Aha, son of Rav Naḥman, clarified that the prohibition is of patches upon patches. Rabbi Hiyya bar Abba also said in Rabbi Joḥanan's name that any scholar who has a grease stain on a garment is worthy of death, for Wisdom says in Proverbs 8:36, "All they that hate me (מְשַׂנְאַי, mesanne'ai) love (merit) death," and we should read not מְשַׂנְאַי, mesanne'ai, but משׂניאי, masni'ai (that make me hated, that is, despised). Thus, a scholar who has no pride in personal appearance brings contempt upon learning. Ravina taught that this was stated about a thick patch (or, others say, a bloodstain). The Gemara harmonized the two opinions by teaching that one referred to an outer garment, the other to an undergarment. Rabbi Hiyya bar Abba also said in Rabbi Joḥanan's name that in Isaiah 20:3, "As my servant Isaiah walked naked and barefoot," "naked" means in worn-out garments, and "barefoot" means in patched shoes.

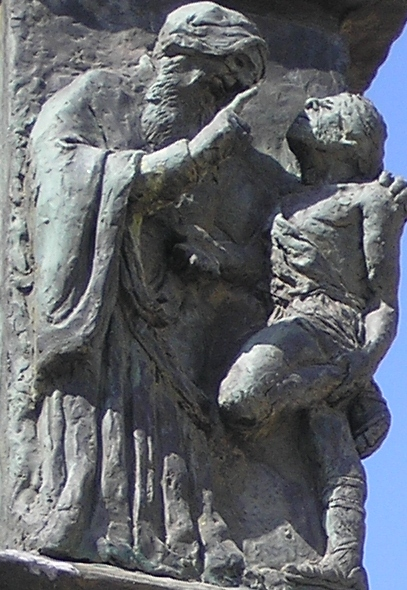
Hillel (sculpture at the Knesset Menorah, Jerusalem)

The Babylonian Talmud related how the description of the High Priest's garments in Exodus 28:4 led a non-Jew to convert to Judaism. The non-Jew asked Shammai to convert him to Judaism on condition that Shammai appoint him High Priest. Shammai pushed him away with a builder's ruler. The non-Jew then went to Hillel, who converted him. The convert then read the Torah, and when he came to the injunction of Numbers 1:51, 3:10, and 18:7 that "the common man who draws near shall be put to death," he asked Hillel to whom the injunction applied. Hillel answered that it applied even to David, King of Israel, who had not been a priest. Thereupon the convert reasoned a fortiori that if the injunction applied to all (non-priestly) Israelites, whom in Exodus 4:22 God had called "my firstborn," how much more so would the injunction apply to a mere convert, who came among the Israelites with just his staff and bag. Then the convert returned to Shammai, quoted the injunction, and remarked on how absurd it had been for him to ask Shammai to appoint him High Priest. And he came before Hillel and blessed him for bringing him under the wings of the Divine Presence.

Rav Naḥman, in the name of Rabbi Mana, noted that the words of Exodus 28:5, "They shall receive gold, blue, and purple and scarlet stuff, and fine twined linen," refer to the recipients in the plural (implying no fewer than two), and reasoned that the verse thus supported the Mishnah's injunction not to appoint fewer than two people to a public position of supervision in property matters.

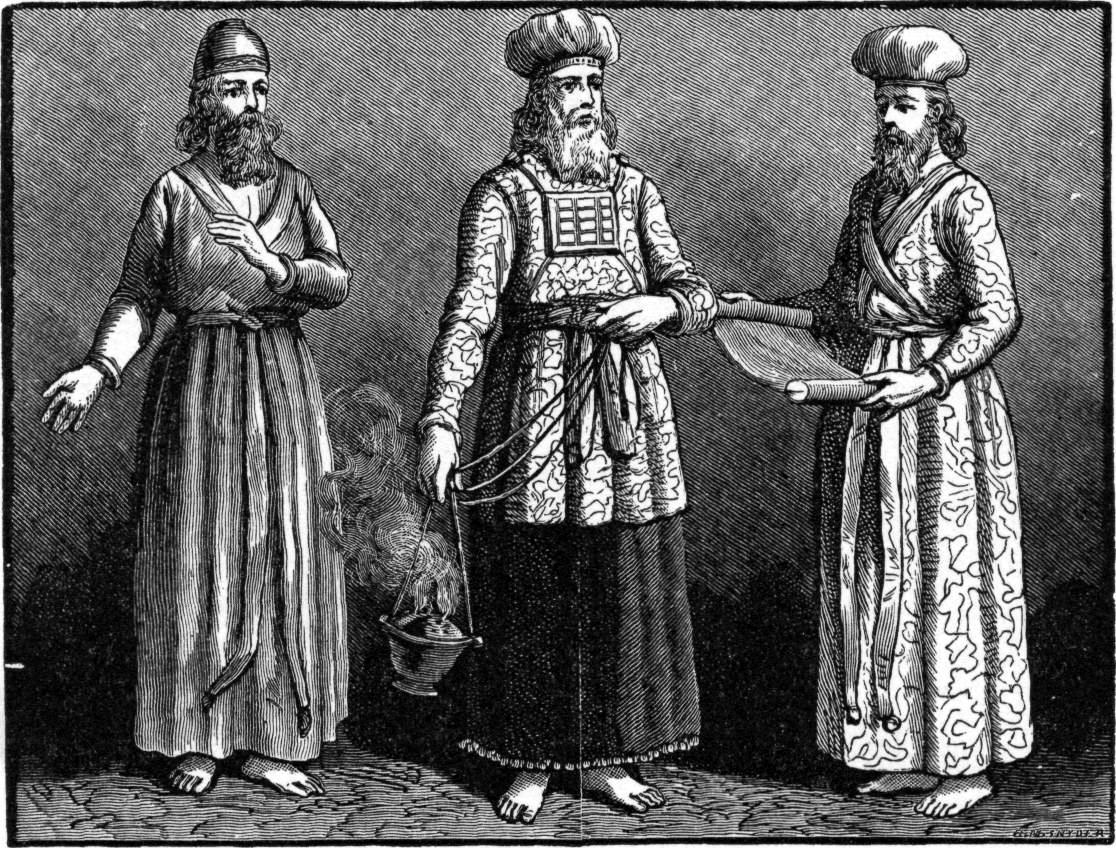
Priests of the Tabernacle (illustration from the 1897 Bible Pictures and What They Teach Us by Charles Foster)

Rabbi Hama bar Ḥanina interpreted the words "the plaited (שְּׂרָד, serad) garments for ministering in the holy place" in Exodus 35:19 to teach that but for the priestly garments described in Exodus 28 (and the atonement achieved by the garments or the priests who wore them), no remnant (שָׂרִיד, sarid) of the Jews would have survived.

Similarly, the Gemara reported that the priestly garments affected atonement. Rabbi Ḥanina taught that the headdress atoned for arrogance, as it was logical that an item placed on the head of a priest would atone for the matter of an elevated heart. The Gemara taught that the belt atoned for the thought of the heart, as it atoned for the sins occurring where it was worn, over the heart, as Exodus 28:30 reports, "And you shall put in the breastplate of judgment the Urim and the Thummim; and it shall be upon Aaron's heart when he goes in before the Lord; and Aaron shall bear the judgment of the children of Israel upon his heart before the Lord continually." The breastplate atoned for improper judgments, as Exodus 28:15 says, "And you shall make a breastplate of judgment." The High Priest's ephod atoned for idol worship, as the words of Hosea 3:4, "And without ephod or teraphim," imply that when there was no ephod, the sin of teraphim, that is, idol worship, was found. The High Priest's robe atoned for malicious speech, as the sounding bells of the robe atoned for the sound of malicious speech. Finally, the High Priest's front plate atoned for brazenness.

Similarly, citing Mishnah Yoma, Rabbi Simon explained that the priests' tunic atoned for those who wore a mixture of wool and linen (שַׁעַטְנֵז, shaatnez, prohibited by Deuteronomy 22:11), as Genesis 37:3 says, "And he made him a coat (tunic) of many colors" (and the Jerusalem Talmud explained that Joseph's coat was similar to one made of the forbidden mixture). The breeches atoned for unchastity, as Exodus 28:42 says, "And you shall make them linen breeches to cover the flesh of their nakedness." The headdress atoned for arrogance, as Exodus 29:6 says, "And you shall set the miter on his head." Some said that the girdle atoned for the crooked in heart, and others said it was for thieves. Rabbi Levi said that the girdle was 32 cubits long (about 48 feet) and that the priest wound it towards the front and towards the back, and this was the ground for saying that it was to atone for the crooked in heart (as the numerical value of the Hebrew word for heart is 32). The one who said that the girdle atoned for thieves argued that since it was hollow, it resembled thieves who do their work secretly, hiding their stolen goods in hollows and caves. The breastplate atoned for those who pervert justice, as Exodus 28:30 says, "And you shall put in the breastplate of judgment." The Ephod atoned for idol-worshippers, as Hosea 3:4 says, "and without Ephod or teraphim." Rabbi Simon taught in the name of Rabbi Nathan that the robe atoned for two sins: unintentional manslaughter (for which the Torah provided cities of refuge) and evil speech.

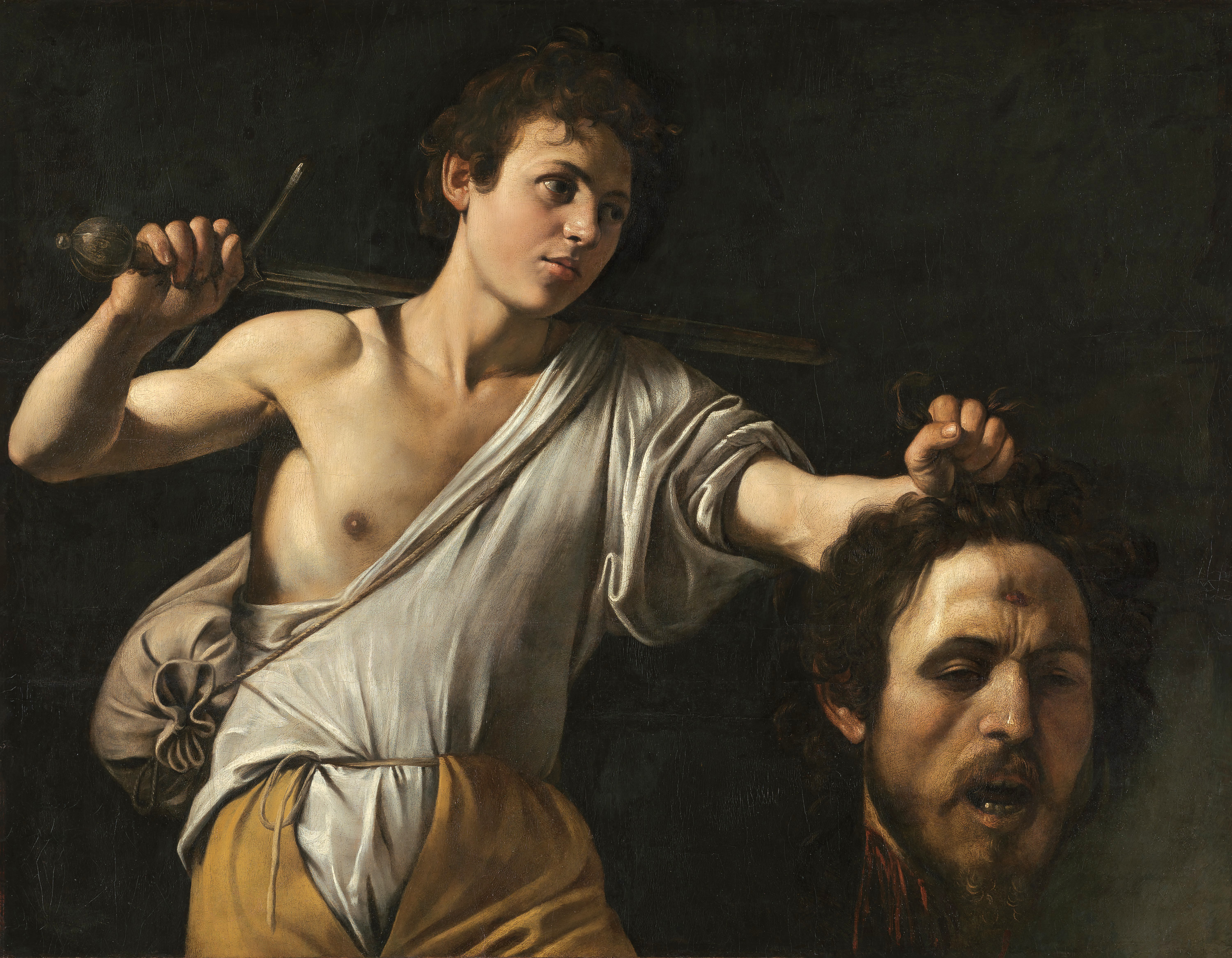
David with the Head of Goliath (painting circa 1606–1607 by Caravaggio)

The robe atoned for evil speech by the bells on its fringe, as Exodus 28:34–35 says, "A golden bell and a pomegranate, a golden bell and a pomegranate, upon the skirts of the robe round about. And it shall be upon Aaron to minister, and the sound thereof shall be heard." Exodus 28:34–35 thus implies that this sound made atonement for the sound of evil speech. There is no strict atonement for one who unintentionally slays a human being, but the Torah provides a means of atonement by the death of the High Priest, as Numbers 35:28 says, "after the death of the High Priest the manslayer may return to the land of his possession." Some said the forehead plate atoned for the shameless, while others said it was for blasphemers. Those who said that it atoned for the shameless deduced it from the similar use of the word "forehead" in Exodus 28:38, which says of the forehead-plate, "And it shall be upon Aaron's forehead," and Jeremiah 3:3, which says, "You had a harlot's forehead, you refused to be ashamed." Those who said that the forehead-plate atoned for blasphemers deduced it from the similar use of the word "forehead" in Exodus 28:38 and 1 Samuel 17:48, which says of Goliath, "And the stone sank into his forehead."

A baraita interpreted the term "his fitted linen garment" (מִדּוֹ, mido) in Leviticus 6:3 to teach that the each priestly garment in Exodus 28 had to be fitted to the particular priest, and had to be neither too short nor too long.

The Rabbis taught in a baraita that the robe (מְעִיל, me'il) mentioned in Exodus 28:4 was entirely of turquoise (תְּכֵלֶת, techelet), as Exodus 39:22 says, "And he made the robe of the ephod of woven work, all of turquoise." They made its hems of turquoise, purple, and crimson wool, twisted together and formed into the shape of pomegranates whose mouths were not yet opened (as overripe pomegranates open slightly) and in the shape of the cones of the helmets on children's heads. Seventy-two bells containing 72 clappers were hung on the robe, 36 on each side (front and behind). Rabbi Dosa (or others say, Judah the Prince) said in the name of Rabbi Judah that there were 36 bells in all, 18 on each side.

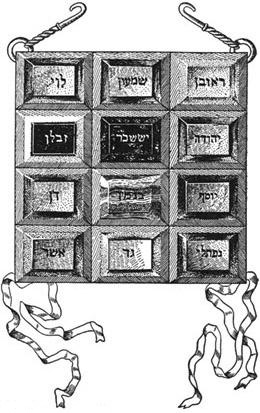
The Breastplate of the High Priest (illustration from the 1905–1906 Jewish Encyclopedia)

Rabbi Eleazar deduced from the words "that the breastplate not be loosed from the Ephod" in Exodus 28:28 that one who removed the breastplate from the apron was punished with lashes. Rav Aha bar Jacob objected that perhaps Exodus 28:28 merely meant instructing the Israelites to fasten the breastplate securely so that it would "not be loosed." But the Gemara noted that Exodus 28:28 does not say merely, "so that it not be loosed."

The Mishnah taught that the High Priest inquired of the Urim and Thummim, as noted in Exodus 28:30, only for the king, for the court, or for one whom the community needed.

A baraita explained why the Urim and Thummim noted in Exodus 28:30 were called by those names: The term "Urim" is like the Hebrew word for "lights," and thus it was called "Urim" because it enlightened. The term "Thummim" is like the Hebrew word tam meaning "to be complete," and thus, it was called "Thummim" because its predictions were fulfilled. The Gemara discussed how they used the Urim and Thummim: Rabbi Joḥanan said that the letters of the stones in the breastplate stood out to spell out the answer. Resh Lakish said that the letters joined each other to spell words. But the Gemara noted that the Hebrew letter צ, tsade, was missing from the list of the 12 tribes of Israel. Rabbi Samuel bar Isaac said that the stones of the breastplate also contained the names of Abraham, Isaac, and Jacob. But the Gemara noted that the Hebrew letter ט, teth, was also missing. Rav Aha bar Jacob said they also said, "The tribes of Jeshurun." The Gemara taught that although the decree of a prophet could be revoked, the decree of the Urim and Thummim could not be revoked, as Numbers 27:21 says, "By the judgment of the Urim."

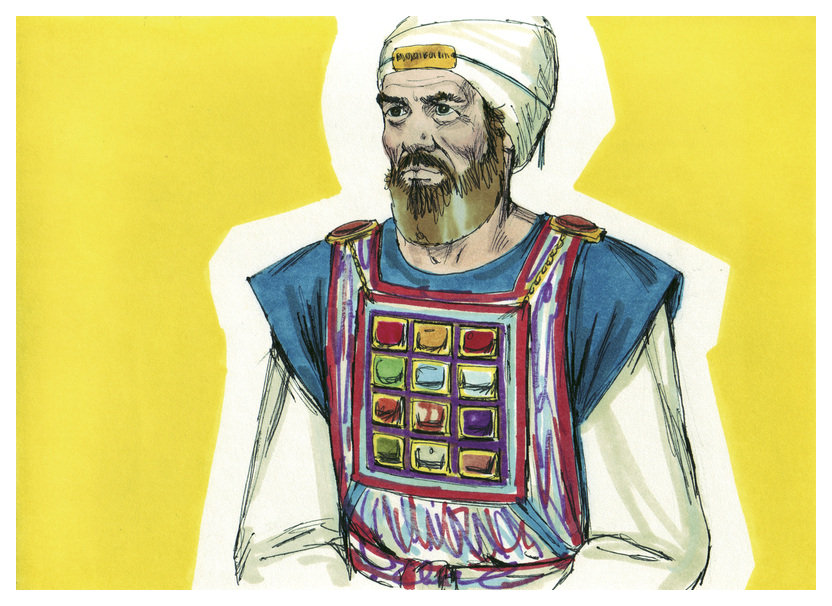
The High Priest wearing his Breastplate (1984 illustration by Jim Padgett, courtesy of Distant Shores Media/Sweet Publishing)

The Pirke De-Rabbi Eliezer taught that when Israel sinned in the matter of the devoted things, as reported in Joshua 7:11, Joshua looked at the 12 stones corresponding to the 12 tribes that were upon the High Priest's breastplate. For every tribe that had sinned, the light of its stone became dim, and Joshua saw that the stone's light for the tribe of Judah had become dim. So Joshua knew that the tribe of Judah had transgressed in the matter of the devoted things. Similarly, the Pirke De-Rabbi Eliezer taught that Saul saw the Philistines turning against Israel, and he knew that Israel had sinned in the matter of the ban. Saul looked at the 12 stones, and for each tribe that had followed the law, its stone (on the High Priest's breastplate) shined with its light, and for each tribe that had transgressed, the light of its stone was dim. So Saul knew that the tribe of Benjamin had trespassed in the matter of the ban.

Resh Lakish read the words of 2 Samuel 21:1, "And David sought the presence of the Lord," to report that David inquired through the Urim and Thummim.

The Mishnah reported that with the death of the former prophets, the Urim and Thummim ceased. In this connection, the Gemara reported differing views of who the former prophets were. Rav Huna said they were David, Samuel, and Solomon. Rav Naḥman said that during the days of David, they were sometimes successful and sometimes not (getting an answer from the Urim and Thummim), for Zadok consulted it and succeeded, while Abiathar consulted it and was not successful, as 2 Samuel 15:24 reports, "And Abiathar went up." (He retired from the priesthood because the Urim and Thummim gave him no reply.) Rabbah bar Samuel asked whether the report of 2 Chronicles 26:5, "And he (King Uzziah of Judah) set himself to seek God all the days of Zechariah, who had understanding in the vision of God," did not refer to the Urim and Thummim. But the Gemara answered that Uzziah did so through Zechariah's prophecy. A baraita said that when the first Temple was destroyed, the Urim and Thummim ceased, and explained Ezra 2:63 (reporting events after the Jews returned from the Babylonian Captivity), "And the governor said to them that they should not eat of the most holy things till there stood up a priest with Urim and Thummim," as a reference to the remote future, as when one speaks of the time of the Messiah. Rav Naḥman concluded that the term "former prophets" referred to a period before Haggai, Zechariah, and Malachi, who were latter prophets. And the Jerusalem Talmud taught that the "former prophets" referred to Samuel and David; thus, the Urim and Thummim did not function in the period of the First Temple, either.

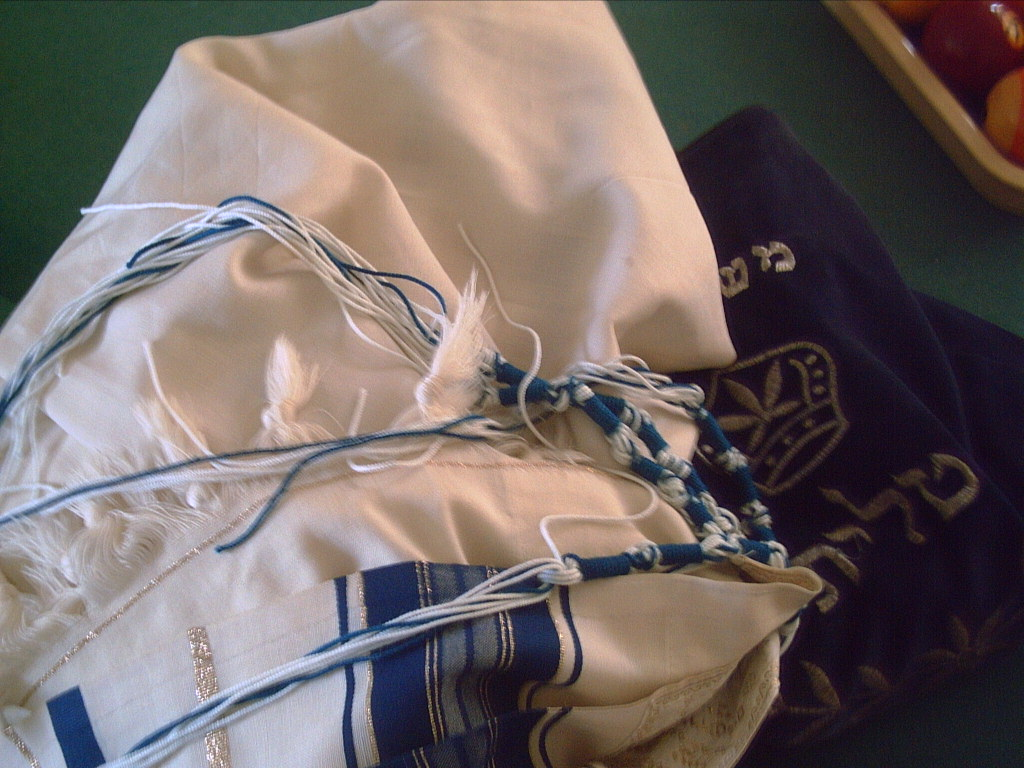
blue tekhelet thread on a set of tzitzit

Rabbi Ḥanina ben Gamaliel interpreted the words "completely blue (תְּכֵלֶת, tekhelet)" in Exodus 28:31 to teach that blue dye used to test the dye is unfit for further use to dye the blue, tekhelet strand of a tzitzit, interpreting the word "completely" to mean "full strength." But Rabbi Joḥanan ben Dahabai taught that even the second dyeing using the same dye is valid, reading the words "and scarlet" (וּשְׁנִי תוֹלַעַת, ushni tolalat) in Leviticus 14:4 to mean "a second [dying] of red wool."

The Gemara reported that some interpreted "woven work" in Exodus 28:32 to teach that all priestly garments were made entirely by weaving, without needlework. But Abaye interpreted a saying of Resh Lakish and a baraita to teach that the sleeves of the priestly garments were woven separately and then attached to the garment using needlework, and the sleeves reached down to the priest's wrist.

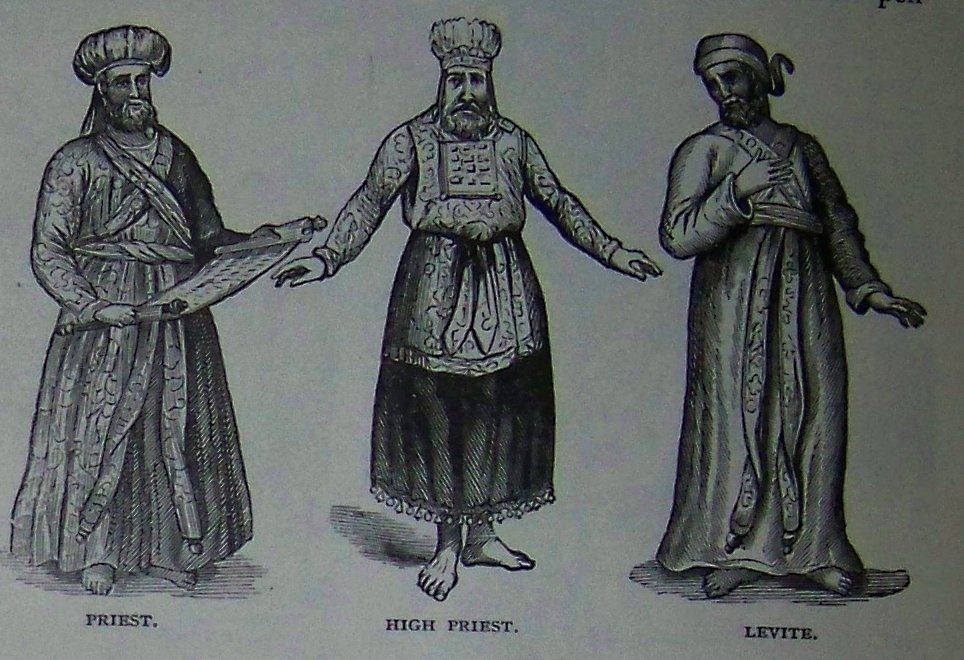
Priest, High Priest, and Levite (illustration from the 1890 Holman Bible)

Rehava said in the name of Rav Judah that one who tore a priestly garment was liable to punishment with lashes, for Exodus 28:32 says, "that it be not rent." Rav Aha bar Jacob objected that perhaps Exodus 28:32 meant to instruct that the Israelites make a hem so that the garment would not tear. But the Gemara noted that Exodus 28:32 does not say merely, "lest it be torn."

Based on Exodus 28:35, "Its sound shall be heard when he goes into the Sanctuary before the Lord," Rabbi Joḥanan would always announce his presence when entering another's place.

A baraita taught that the golden head-plate of Exodus 28:36–38 was two fingerbreadths wide and stretched around the High Priest's forehead from ear to ear. The baraita taught that two lines were written on it, with the four-letter name of God יהוה on the top line and "holy to" (קֹדֶשׁ לַ, kodesh la) on the bottom line. But Rabbi Eliezer, son of Rabbi Jose said that he saw it in Rome (where it was taken after the destruction of the Temple) and "holy to the Lord" (קֹדֶשׁ לַיהוה) was written in one line.

Rabbi (Judah the Prince) taught there was no difference between the High Priest's tunic, belt, turban, and breeches and those of the common priest in Exodus 28:40–43, except in the belt. Rabbi Eleazar, the son of Rabbi Simeon, taught that there was not even any distinction in the belt. Ravin reported that all agree that on Yom Kippur, the High Priest's belt was made of fine linen (as stated in Leviticus 16:4), and during the rest of the year a belt made of both wool and linen (shatnez) (as stated in Exodus 39:29). The difference concerned only the common priest's belt, both on the Day of Atonement and during the rest of the year. Rabbi said it was made of wool and linen, and Rabbi Eleazar, the son of Rabbi Simeon, said it was made of fine linen.

A baraita taught that the priests' breeches of Exodus 28:42 were like the knee breeches of horse riders, reaching upwards to the hips and downwards to the thighs. They had laces but no padding in the back or front (and thus fit loosely).

=== Exodus chapter 29 ===
A midrash taught that when God so pleased, God called for atonement for the Golden Calf through a male agent, as in Exodus 29:1, with regard to the investiture of the Priests, "Take one young bullock (פַּר, par)." When God so pleased, God called for that atonement through a female agent, as in Numbers 19:2, "That they bring you a red heifer (פָרָה, parah), faultless, wherein is no blemish . . . ."

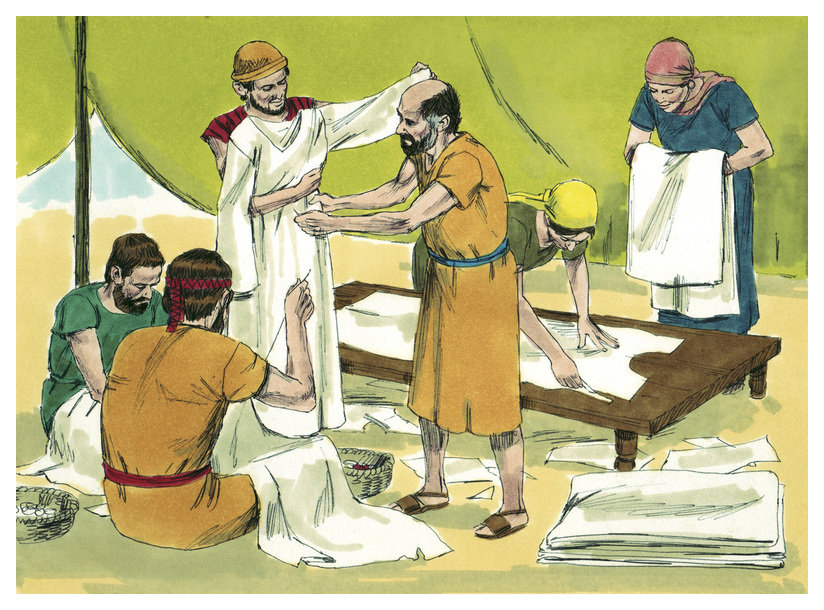
Fitting a Priest's Garments (1984 illustration by Jim Padgett, courtesy of Distant Shores Media/Sweet Publishing)

A baraita taught that a priest who performed sacrifices without the proper priestly garments was liable to death at the hands of Heaven. Rabbi Abbahu said in the name of Rabbi Joḥanan (or some say, Rabbi Eleazar, son of Rabbi Simeon) that the baraita's teaching was derived from Exodus 29:9, which says: "And you shall gird them with girdles, Aaron and his sons, and bind turbans on them; and they shall have the priesthood by a perpetual statute." Thus, the Gemara reasoned that priests were invested with their priesthood when wearing their priestly garments. Still, when they were not wearing their proper priestly garments, they lacked their priesthood and were considered like non-priests, who were liable to death if they performed the priestly service.

A midrash asked: As Exodus 29:9 reported that there already were 70 elders of Israel, why, in Numbers 11:16, did God direct Moses to gather 70 elders of Israel? The midrash deduced that when in Numbers 11:1, the people murmured, speaking evil, and God sent fire to devour part of the camp, all those earlier 70 elders had been burned up. The midrash continued that the earlier 70 elders were consumed like Nadab and Abihu because they too acted frivolously when (as reported in Exodus 24:11) they beheld God and inappropriately ate and drank. The midrash taught that Nadab, Abihu, and the 70 elders deserved to die then, but because God so loved giving the Torah, God did not wish to disturb that time.

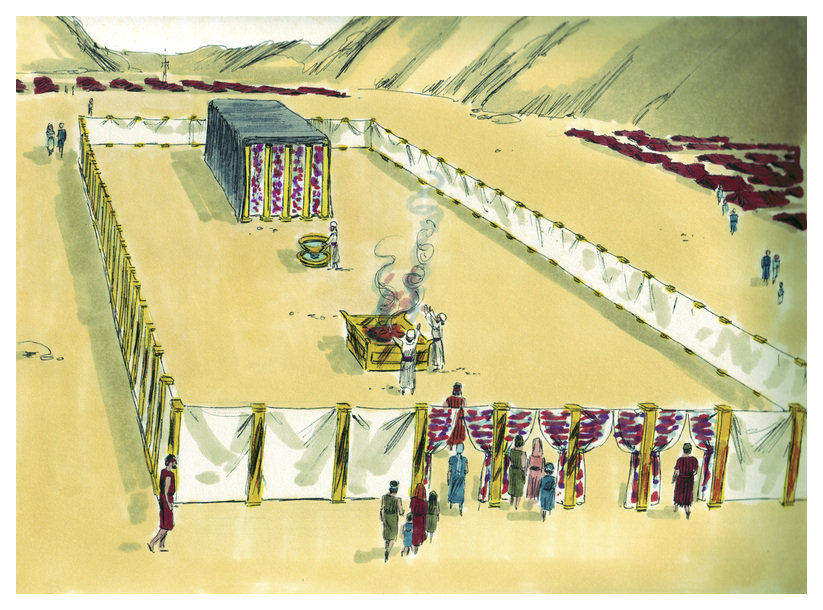
Priests Offering at the Altar (1984 illustration by Jim Padgett, courtesy of Distant Shores Media/Sweet Publishing)

The Mishnah explained how the priests carried out the rites of the wave-offering described in Exodus 29:27: On the east side of the altar, the priest placed the two loaves on the two lambs and put his two hands beneath them and waved them forward and backward and upward and downward.

The Sages interpreted the words of Exodus 29:27, "which is waved, and which is heaved up," to teach that the priest moved an offering forward and backward, upward and downward. As Exodus 29:27 thus compares "heaving" to "waving," the midrash deduced that he also heaved in every case where the priest waved.

Rabbi Joḥanan deduced from the reference of Exodus 29:29 to "the holy garments of Aaron" that Numbers 31:6 refers to the priestly garments containing the Urim and Thummim when it reports that "Moses sent . . . Phinehas the son of Eleazar the priest, to the war, with the holy vessels." But the midrash concluded that Numbers 31:6 refers to the Ark of the Covenant, to which Numbers 7:9 refers when it says, "the service of the holy things."

A baraita noted a difference in wording between Exodus 29:30, regarding the investiture of the High Priest, and Leviticus 16:32, regarding the qualifications for performing the Yom Kippur service. Exodus 29:29–30 says, "The holy garments of Aaron shall be for his sons after him, to be anointed in them, and to be consecrated in them. Seven days shall the son that is a priest in his stead put them on." This text demonstrated that a priest who had put on the required larger number of garments and who had been anointed on each of the seven days was permitted to serve as High Priest. Leviticus 16:32, however, says, "And the priest who shall be anointed and who shall be consecrated to be a priest in his father's stead shall make the atonement." The baraita interpreted the words, "Who shall be anointed and who shall be consecrated," to mean one who had been anointed and consecrated in whatever way (as long as he had been consecrated, even if some detail of the ceremony had been omitted). The baraita thus concluded that if the priest had put on the larger number of garments for only one day and had been anointed on each of the seven days, or if he had been anointed for only one day and had put on the larger number of garments for seven days, he would also be permitted to perform the Yom Kippur service. Noting that Exodus 29:30 indicated that the larger number of garments was necessary in the first instance for the seven days, the Gemara asked what Scriptural text supported the proposition that anointment on each of the seven days was in the first instance required. The Gemara answered that one could infer that from the fact that a special statement of the Torah was necessary to exclude it. Or, in the alternative, one could infer that from Exodus 29:29, which says, "And the holy garments of Aaron shall be for his sons after him, to be anointed in them, and to be consecrated in them." As Exodus 29:29 puts the anointing and the donning of the larger number of garments on the same level, just as the donning of the larger number of garments was required for seven days, so was the anointing obligatory for seven days.

Rabbi Eliezer interpreted the words, "And there I will meet with the children of Israel; and [the Tabernacle] shall be sanctified by My glory," in Exodus 29:43 to mean that God would in the future meet the Israelites and be sanctified among them. The midrash reports that this occurred on the eighth day of the consecration of the Tabernacle, as reported in Leviticus 9:1. And as Leviticus 9:24 reports, "when all the people saw, they shouted, and fell on their faces."

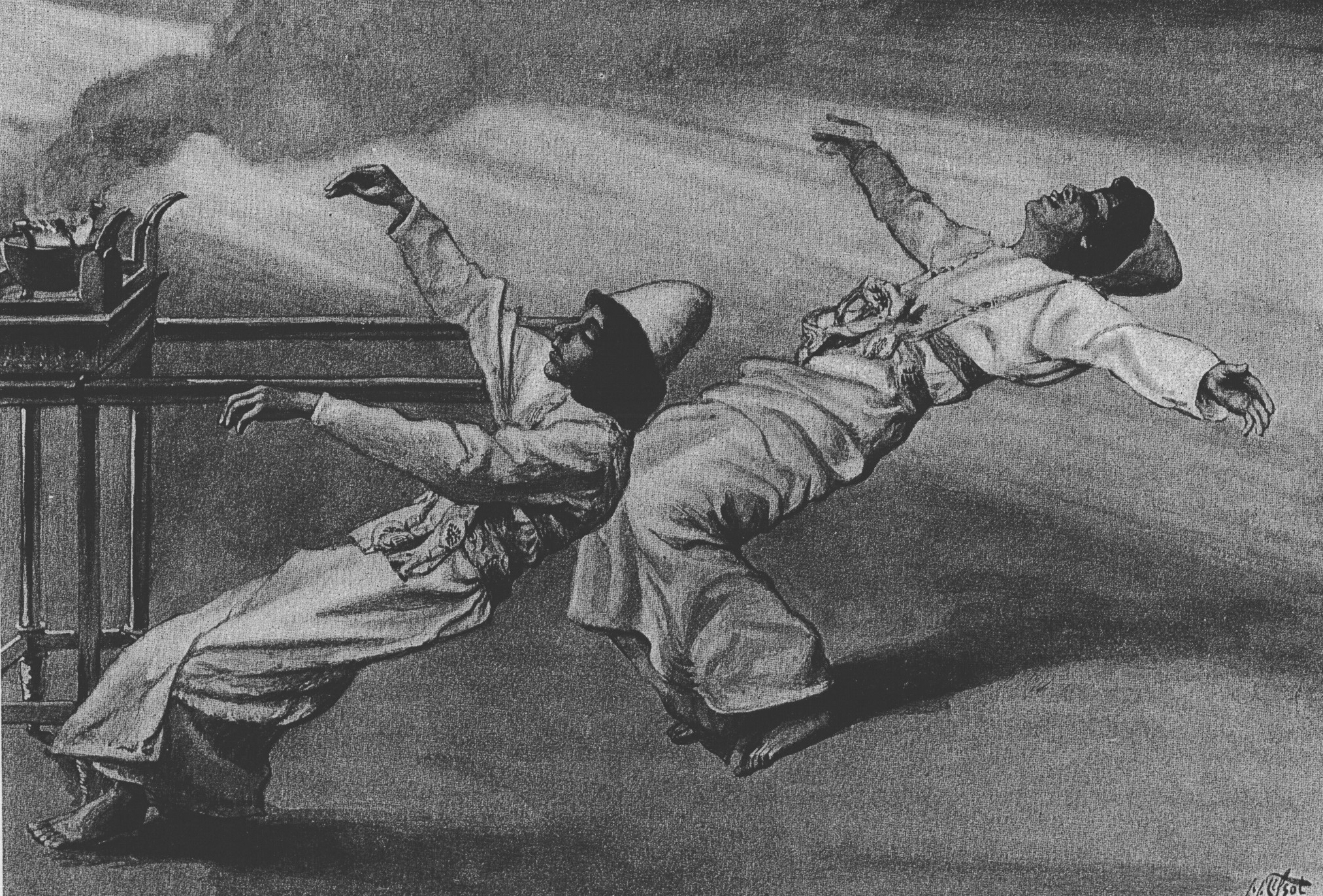
The Two Priests Are Destroyed (watercolor circa 1896–1902 by James Tissot)

The Mekhilta interpreted the words, "And there I will meet with the children of Israel; and it shall be sanctified by My glory," in Exodus 29:43 to be the words to which Moses referred in Leviticus 10:3, when he said, "This is it what the Lord spoke, saying: 'Through them who are near to Me I will be sanctified.'"

The Gemara interpreted the report in Exodus 29:43 that the Tabernacle "shall be sanctified by My glory" to refer to the death of Nadab and Abihu. The Gemara taught that one should read not "My glory" (bi-khevodi) but "My honored ones" (bi-khevuday). The Gemara thus taught that God told Moses in Exodus 29:43 that God would sanctify the Tabernacle through the death of Nadab and Abihu. Still, Moses did not comprehend God's meaning until Nadab and Abihu died in Leviticus 10:2. When Aaron's sons died, Moses told Aaron in Leviticus 10:3 that Aaron's sons died only that God's glory might be sanctified through them. When Aaron thus perceived that his sons were God's honored ones, Aaron was silent, as Leviticus 10:3 reports, "And Aaron held his peace," and Aaron was rewarded for his silence.

Joshua ben Levi interpreted the words of Exodus 29:46, "And they shall know that I am the Lord their God, Who brought them out of the land of Egypt in order that I may dwell among them," to teach that the Israelites came out of Egypt only because God foresaw that they would later build God a Tabernacle.

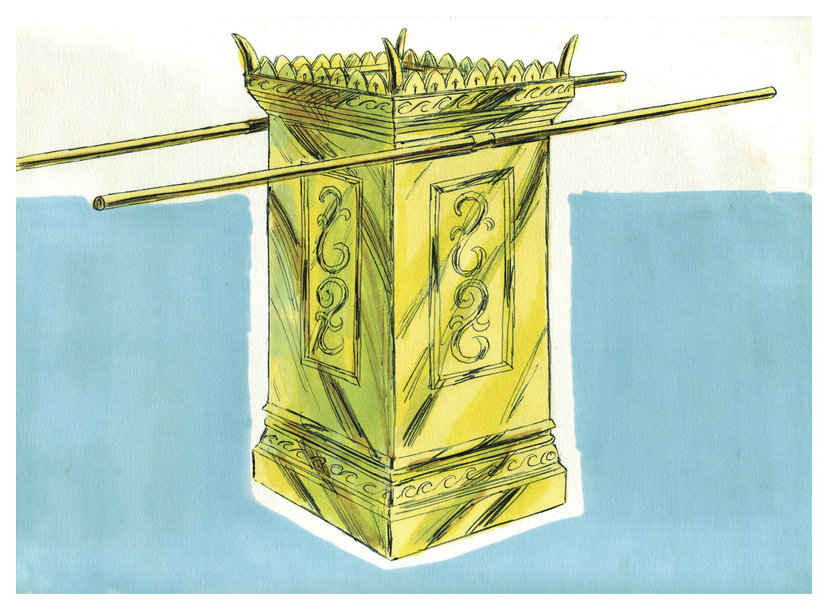
The Inner Altar (1984 illustration by Jim Padgett, courtesy of Distant Shores Media/Sweet Publishing)

=== Exodus chapter 30 ===
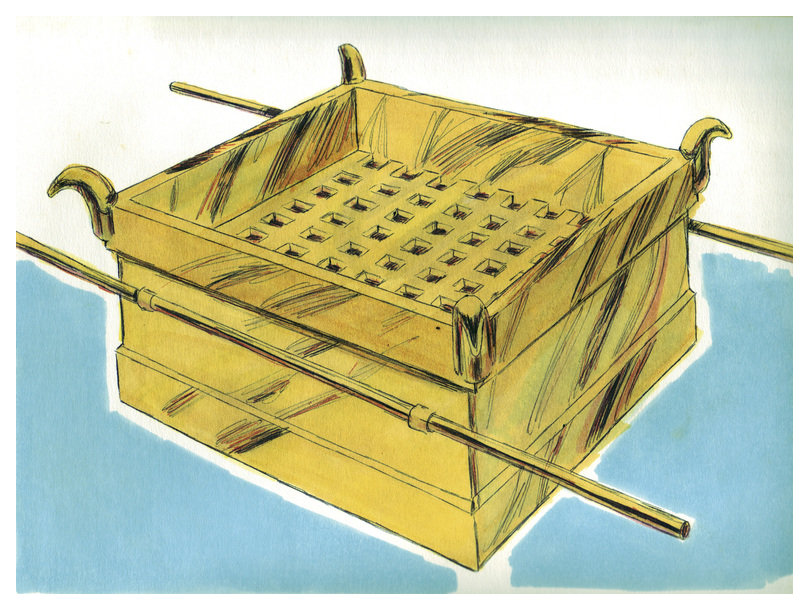
The Outer Altar (1984 illustration by Jim Padgett, courtesy of Distant Shores Media/Sweet Publishing)

Rabbi Jose argued that the dimensions of the inner altar in Exodus 30:2 helped to interpret the size of the outer altar. Rabbi Judah maintained that the outer altar was wider than Rabbi Jose thought, whereas Rabbi Jose maintained that the outer altar was taller than Rabbi Judah thought it was. Rabbi Jose said that one should read literally the words of Exodus 27:1, "five cubits long, and five cubits broad." But Rabbi Judah noted that Exodus 27:1 uses the word "square" (רָבוּעַ, ravua), just as Ezekiel 43:16 uses the word "square" (רָבוּעַ, ravua). Rabbi Judah argued that just as in Ezekiel 43:16, the dimension was measured from the center (so that the dimension described only one quadrant of the total), so the dimensions of Exodus 27:1 should be measured from the center (and thus, according to Rabbi Judah, the altar was 10 cubits on each side.) The Gemara explained that we know that this is how to understand Ezekiel 43:16 because Ezekiel 43:16 says, "And the hearth shall be 12 cubits long by 12 cubits broad, square," and Ezekiel 43:16 continues, "to the four sides thereof," teaching that the measurement was taken from the middle (interpreting "to" as intimating that from a particular point, there were 12 cubits in all directions, hence from the center). Rabbi Jose, however, reasoned that the word "square" was used in everyday speech to describe the altar's height. Rabbi Judah said that one should read literally the words of Exodus 27:1, "And the height thereof shall be three cubits." But Rabbi Jose noted that Exodus 27:1 uses the word "square" (רָבוּעַ, ravua), just as Exodus 30:2 uses the word "square" (רָבוּעַ, ravua, referring to the inner altar). Rabbi Jose argued that just as in Exodus 30:2, the altar's height was twice its length, so in Exodus 27:1, the height was to be read twice its length (thus, the altar was 10 cubits high). Rabbi Judah questioned Rabbi Jose's conclusion: if priests stood on the altar to perform the service 10 cubits above the ground, the people would see them from outside the courtyard. Rabbi Jose replied to Rabbi Judah that Numbers 4:26 states, "And the hangings of the court, and the screen for the door of the gate of the court, which is by the Tabernacle and by the altar round about," teaching that just as the Tabernacle was 10 cubits high, so was the altar 10 cubits high. Exodus 38:14 says, "The hangings for the one side were fifteen cubits" (teaching that the courtyard walls were 15 cubits high). The Gemara explained that according to Rabbi Jose's reading, the words of Exodus 27:18, "And the height five cubits," meant from the upper edge of the altar to the top of the hangings. According to Rabbi Jose, Exodus 27:1, "and the height thereof shall be three cubits," meant that there were three cubits from the edge of the terrace (on the side of the altar) to the top of the altar. Rabbi Judah, however, granted that the priest could be seen outside the Tabernacle but argued that the sacrifice in his hands could not be seen.

The Mishnah taught that the incense offering of Exodus 30:7 was not subject to the penalty associated with eating invalidated offerings.

== In medieval Jewish interpretation ==
The parashah is discussed in these medieval Jewish sources:

=== Exodus chapter 28 ===
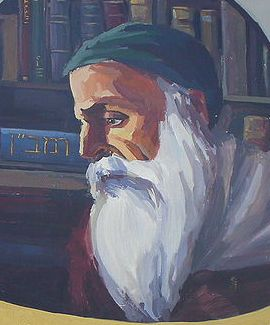
Naḥmanides

Interpreting Exodus 28:2, "And you shall make holy garments for Aaron your brother, for splendor and for beauty," Naḥmanides taught that the High Priest's garments corresponded to the garments that monarchs wore when the Torah was given. Thus, Naḥmanides taught that the "tunic of checker work" in Exodus 28:4 was a royal garment, like the one worn by David's daughter Tamar in 2 Samuel 13:18, "Now she had a garment of many colors upon her; for with such robes were the king's daughters that were virgins appareled." The miter in Exodus 28:4 was known among monarchs, as Ezekiel 21:31 notes with reference to the fall of the kingdom of Judah, "The miter shall be removed, and the crown taken off." Naḥmanides taught that the ephod and the breastplate were also royal garments, and the plate that the High Priest wore around the forehead was like a monarch's crown. Finally, Naḥmanides noted that the High Priest's garments were made of (in the words of Exodus 28:5) "gold," "blue-purple," and "red-purple," which were all symbolic of royalty.

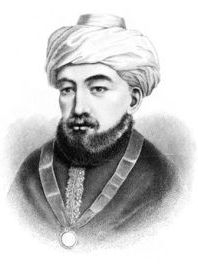
Maimonides

Maimonides taught that God selected priests for service in the Tabernacle in Exodus 28:41 and instituted the practice of sacrifices generally as transitional steps to wean the Israelites off the worship of the times and move them toward prayer as the primary means of worship. Maimonides noted that in nature, God created animals that develop gradually. For example, when a mammal is born, it is extremely tender, and cannot eat dry food, so God provided breasts that yield milk to feed the young animal, until it can eat dry food. Similarly, Maimonides taught, God instituted many laws as temporary measures, as it would have been impossible for the Israelites suddenly to discontinue everything to which they had become accustomed. So God sent Moses to make the Israelites (in the words of Exodus 19:6) "a kingdom of priests and a holy nation." But the general custom of worship in those days was sacrificing animals in temples that contained idols. So God did not command the Israelites to give up those manners of service, but allowed them to continue. God transferred to God's service what had formerly served as a worship of idols, and commanded the Israelites to serve God in the same manner—namely, to build to a Sanctuary (Exodus 25:8), to erect the altar to God's name (Exodus 20:21), to offer sacrifices to God (Leviticus 1:2), to bow down to God, and to burn incense before God. God forbade doing any of these things to any other being and selected priests for the service in the temple in Exodus 28:41: "And they shall minister to me in the priest's office." By this Divine plan, God blotted out the traces of idolatry, and established the great principle of the Existence and Unity of God. But the sacrificial service, Maimonides taught, was not the primary object of God's commandments about sacrifice; rather, supplications, prayers, and similar kinds of worship are nearer to the primary object. Thus, God limited sacrifice to only one temple (see Deuteronomy 12:26) and the priesthood to only the members of a particular family. These restrictions, Maimonides taught, served to limit sacrificial worship, and kept it within such bounds that God did not feel it necessary to abolish sacrificial service altogether. But in the Divine plan, prayer and supplication can be offered everywhere and by every person, as can be the wearing of tzitzit (Numbers 15:38) and tefillin (Exodus 13:9, 16) and similar kinds of service.

== In modern interpretation ==
The parashah is discussed in these modern sources:

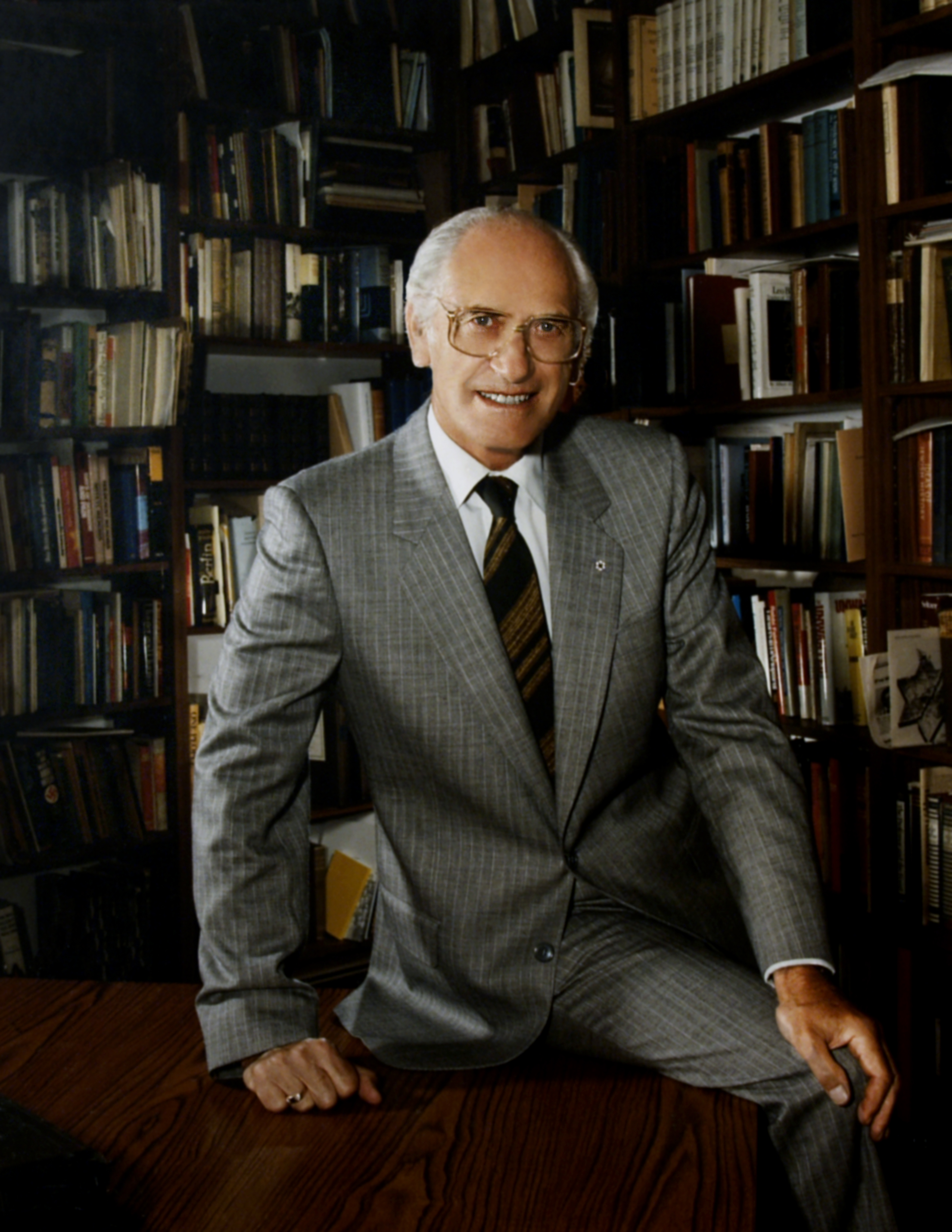
Plaut

=== Exodus chapter 27 ===
Gunther Plaut reported that after the Romans destroyed the Temple, Jews sought to honor the commandment in Exodus 27:20–21 to light the Menorah by keeping a separate light, a ner tamid, in the synagogue. Originally Jews set the ner tamid opposite the ark on the synagogue's western wall, but then moved it to a niche by the side of the ark and later to a lamp suspended above the ark. Plaut reported that the ner tamid has come to symbolize God's presence, a spiritual light emanating as if from the Temple.

=== Exodus chapter 28 ===
Noting that Exodus 28:1 first introduces Aaron and his family as “priests” without further defining the term, Plaut concluded that either the institution was already well known at the time (as the Egyptians and Midianites had priests) or that the story was retrojected back from a later time that had long known priests and their job. Scholars found the priestly garments unrealistic, complex, and extravagant, hardly befitting a wilderness setting. Plaut concluded, however, that while the text likely contains embellishments from later times, there is little reason to doubt that it also reports traditions going back to Israel's earliest days.

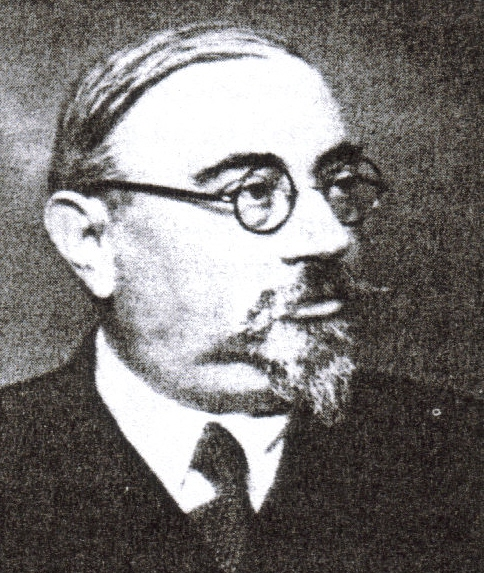
Cassuto

Reading in Exodus 28:2 the instruction to make holy garments for Aaron and his sons “for glory and for beauty,” Umberto Cassuto explained that these were clothes that would indicate the degree of holiness in keeping with his high office. Nahum Sarna wrote that God ordained special attire for Aaron and his sons as insignia of office, so that the occupants of the sacred office could be distinguishable from the laity just as sacred space could be differentiated from profane space. Reading “for glory and for beauty” in Exodus 28:2, Richard Elliott Friedman argued that beauty is inspiring and valuable, and that religion is not the enemy of the senses.

Sarna noted that Exodus 28 makes no mention of footwear, as the priests officiated barefoot. Carol Meyers inferred that the priests wore no shoes on holy ground, noting that in Exodus 3:5, God told Moses to take off his shoes, for the place on which he stood was holy ground.

Plaut reported that the priestly garments enumerated in Exodus 28:2–43 are the direct antecedents of those used today in the Catholic and Greek Orthodox Churches, whose priests—and especially bishops—wear similar robes when officiating. In the synagogue, the Torah scroll is similarly embellished and dressed in an embroidered mantle and crowned by pomegranates and bells.

Noting that amid the description of the “glorious” priestly garments in Exodus 28:2–43 is the warning in Exodus 28:35 that Aaron might die, Walter Brueggemann wondered whether the text intends to convey the irony that one so well appointed was under threat of death. And Brueggemann noted that Exodus 25–31 proceeds to Exodus 32 (which he admitted came from a different textual tradition) and wondered whether the text means to convey that Aaron was seduced by his glorious adornment to act as he did in the incident of the Golden Calf. Brueggemann concluded that the affirmation and devastating critique of Aaron live close together in the text, teaching that the affirmation, the temptation, and the critique are inherent in the priesthood and the handler of holy things.

Nili Fox wrote that it is no accident that the violet-blue wool cord that Numbers 15:37–40 required be attached to the fringes is identical to the cord that hangs from the priest's headdress in Exodus 28:37. Fox argued that the tzitzit on the Israelites' garments identified them as being holy to God and symbolically connected them to the priests. Thereby, the Israelites pledged their loyalty to God as well as to the priests who oversaw the laws.

Reading God's command in Exodus 28:41 for Moses to anoint Aaron and his sons, Plaut reported that anointing was a common procedure in antiquity to induct priests or kings into office. Anointing oil symbolized wellbeing, and its daily use (especially in later Rome) was emblematic of the good life. The pouring of oil on the head signified having been favored by or set apart for the deity. Israelites chiefly used olive oil for ointments, Babylonians also used sesame oil and animal fats, and Egyptians used almond oil and animal fats.

=== Exodus chapter 29 ===
Everett Fox noted that “glory” (כְּבוֹד, kevod) and “stubbornness” (כָּבֵד לֵב, kaved lev) are leading words throughout the book of Exodus that give it a sense of unity. Similarly, William Propp identified the root kvd—connoting heaviness, glory, wealth, and firmness—as a recurring theme in Exodus: Moses suffered from a heavy mouth in Exodus 4:10 and heavy arms in Exodus 17:12; Pharaoh had firmness of heart in Exodus 7:14; 8:11, 28; 9:7, 34; and 10:1; Pharaoh made Israel's labor heavy in Exodus 5:9; God in response sent heavy plagues in Exodus 8:20; 9:3, 18, 24; and 10:14, so that God might be glorified over Pharaoh in Exodus 14:4, 17, and 18; and the book culminates with the descent of God's fiery Glory, described as a “heavy cloud,” first upon Sinai and later upon the Tabernacle in Exodus 19:16; 24:16–17; 29:43; 33:18, 22; and 40:34–38.

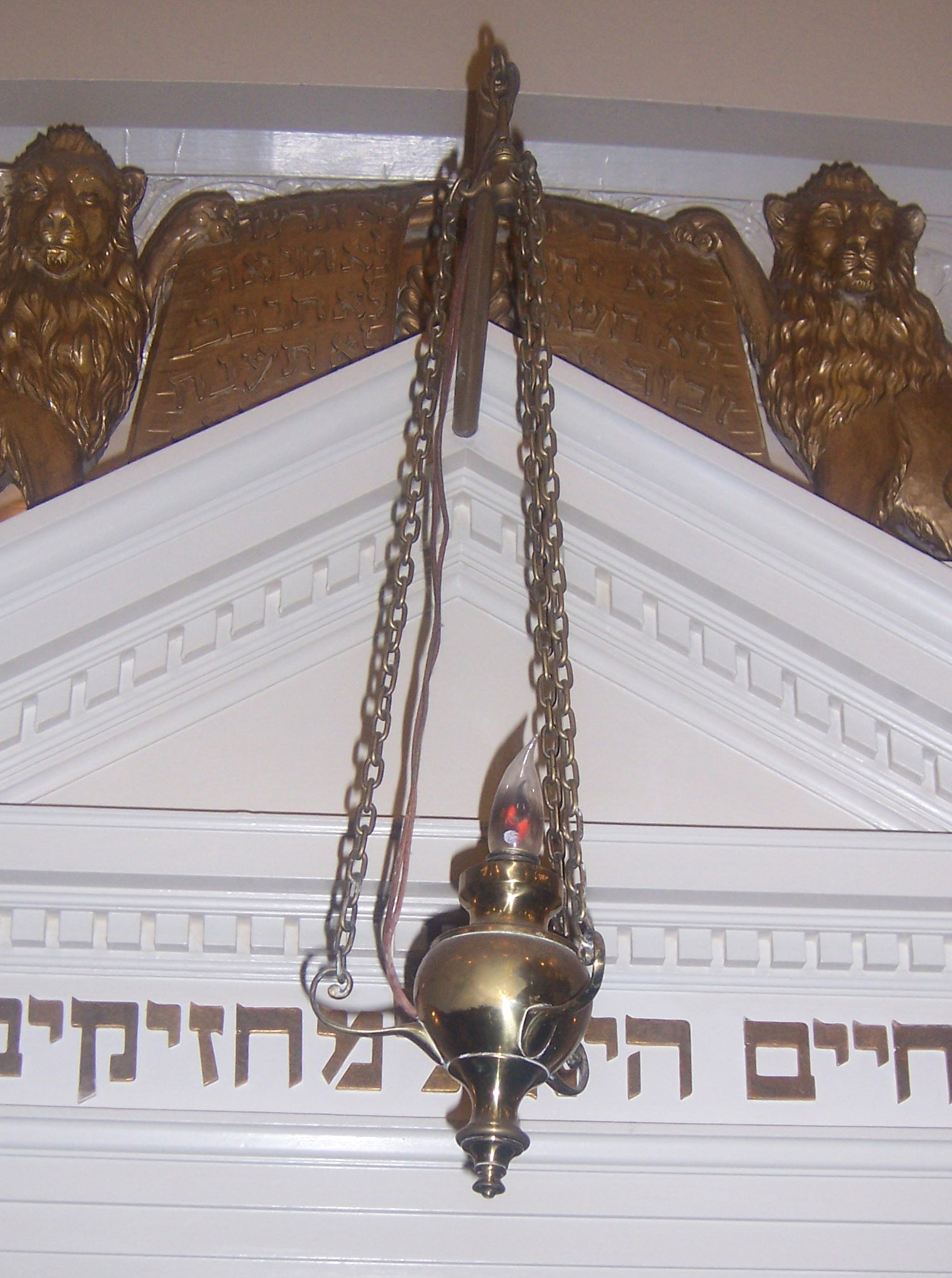
a ner tamid (נֵר תָּמִיד), or sanctuary lamp, hanging over the ark in a synagogue, in remembrance of the command in Exodus 27:20–21

== Commandments ==
According to Maimonides and Sefer ha-Chinuch, there are 4 positive and 3 negative commandments in the parashah:

- To light the Menorah every day
- The Kohanim must wear their priestly garments during service.
- The breastpiece must not be loosened from the Ephod.
- Not to tear the priestly garments
- The Kohanim must eat the sacrificial meat.
- To burn incense every day
- Not to burn anything on the incense altar besides incense

== In the liturgy ==
The tamid sacrifice that Exodus 29:38–39 called for the priests to offer at twilight presaged the afternoon prayer service, called "Mincha" or "offering" in Hebrew.

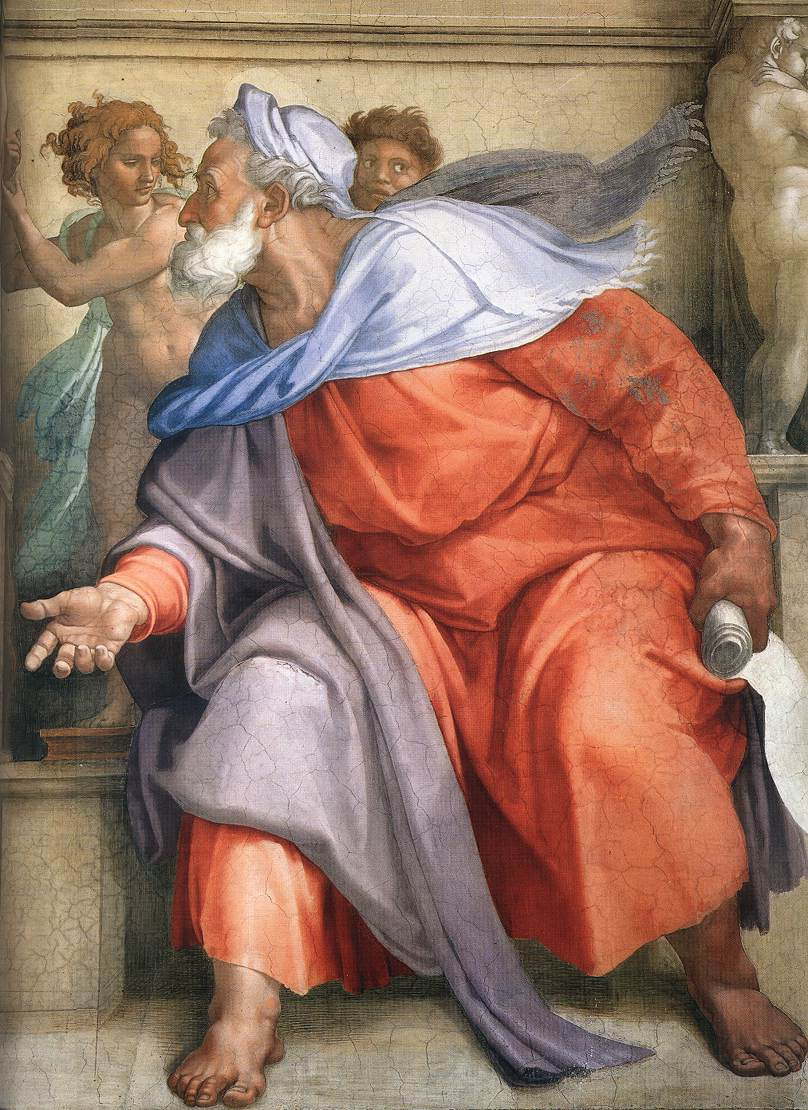
Ezekiel (1510 fresco by Michelangelo in the Sistine Chapel)

== Haftarah ==
=== Generally ===
The haftarah for the parashah is Ezekiel 43:10–27.

==== Connection to the Parashah ====
Both the parashah and the haftarah in Ezekiel describe God's holy sacrificial altar and its consecration, the parashah in the Tabernacle in the wilderness, and the haftarah in Ezekiel's conception of a future Temple. Both the parashah and the haftarah describe plans conveyed by a mighty prophet, Moses in the parashah and Ezekiel in the haftarah.

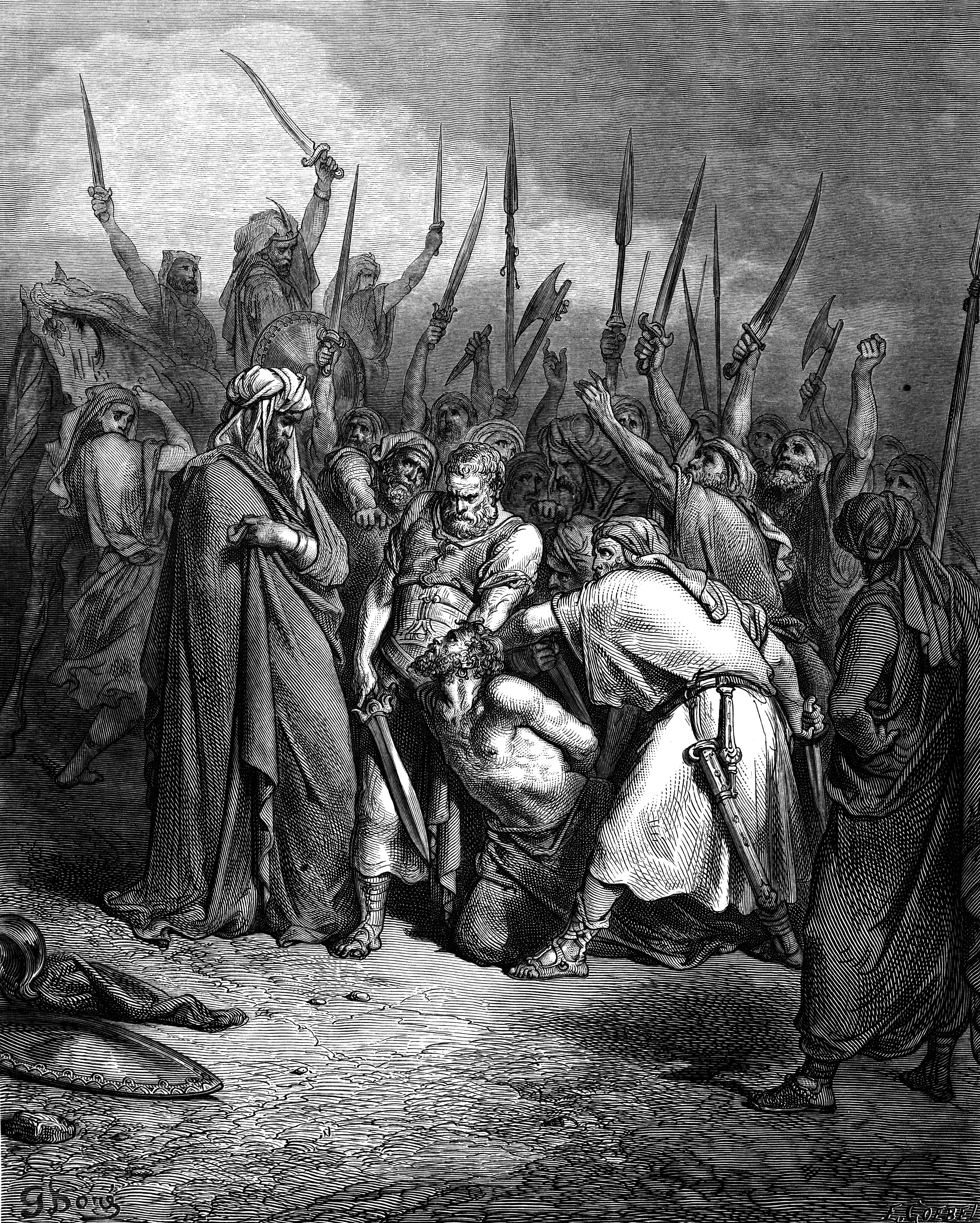
The Death of Agag (illustration by Gustave Doré from the 1865 La Sainte Bible)

=== On Shabbat Zachor ===
When Parashat Tetzaveh coincides with Shabbat Zachor (the special Sabbath immediately preceding Purim), as it does in 2025, 2026, 2028, 2029, 2031, 2032, 2034, 2036, 2037, 2039, 2040, 2042, 2044, 2045, 2047, and 2050, the haftarah is:

- for Ashkenazi Jews: 1 Samuel 15:2–34;
- for Sephardi Jews: 1 Samuel 15:1–34.

==== Connection to the Special Sabbath ====
On Shabbat Zachor, the Sabbath just before Purim, Jews read Deuteronomy 25:17–19, which instructs Jews: "Remember (זָכוֹר, zachor) what Amalek did" in attacking the Israelites. The haftarah for Shabbat Zachor, 1 Samuel 15:2–34 or 1–34, describes Saul's encounter with Amalek and Saul's and Samuel's treatment of the Amalekite king Agag. Purim, in turn, commemorates the story of Esther (said to be a descendant of Saul in some rabbinic literature) and the Jewish people's victory over Haman's plan to kill the Jews, told in the book of Esther. Esther 3:1 identifies Haman as an Agagite, and thus a descendant of Amalek. Numbers 24:7 identifies the Agagites with the Amalekites. Alternatively, a midrash tells the story that between King Agag's capture by Saul and his killing by Samuel, Agag fathered a child, from whom Haman in like turn descended.
