= Targum Rishon =

Aramaic elaboration of Esther

The Targum Rishon, also known as the First Targum of Esther in the Hebrew, is an Aramaic translation (targum) and elaboration of the Book of Esther. Compared to Targum Sheni (or the Second Targum of Esther), it is less embellished and shorter, coming out as less than half the length of Targum Sheni. Targum Rishon is dated approximately between 500 and 700, postdating the Babylonian Talmud, and of Palestinian provenance. A recent suggestion places the origins of both targums in early seventh century Palestine, and proposes that both are derivatives of an earlier rabbinic text called Esther Rabbati.

Both the First and Second Targums should not be confused with another targum of Esther mentioned by tractate Megillah of the Talmud, which is an earlier but now lost text.

== Editorial additions to the Book of Esther ==
The text alternates between word-for-word renderings of Esther and entire rewrites. The majority of the time, only a few words are added to clarify the meaning of the passage. One is example is Targum Rishon to Esther 3:5: "Haman became filled with anger against Mordekhai" (italics added). One case of a lengthy insertion is in Targum Rishon 1:1. The original verse reads:

It happened during the days of the wicked Xerxes, the Xerxes who ruled 127 provinces, from India to Western Ethiopia.

Whereas the Targum reads:

It happened during the days of the wicked Xerxes, the Xerxes in whose days (the decree allowing) work on the house of the great God was revoked. It remained revoked until the second year of Darius on the advice of the sinful Vashti, daughter of Evil Merodakh, son of Nebukhadnezzar. Because she did not permit the rebuilding of the Temple, it was decreed she be executed in the nude. And because Xerxes listened to her advice, his life was shortened and his kingdom was split up. Previously all peoples, nations, and (speakers of various) languages, and provinces were under his rule, but now they were no longer subjected to him. In view of this fact, and subsequently, when it was revealed before the Lord that Vashti would be killed and that he was destined to marry Esther, who was a descendant of Sarah, who lived 127 years, he was given an extension and he ruled 127 provinces, from India to Western Ethiopia.

The passage adds significant new information about Ahasuerus and Vashti. Vashti is now cast as the granddaughter of Nebuchadnezzar II, who destroyed the Second Temple, explaining why Targum Rishon portrays her so negatively. Another fantastic embellishment can be found in Targum Rishon 6:1. Overall, Targum Rishon tends to add more midrashic material as opposed to directly interpreting the text.

Another addition in Targum Rishon is in making Esther a much more religious and Jewish text. The original text does not mention God or any recognizably Jewish practices. In Targum Rishon, God becomes an active participant in the progression of the story, for example by punishing Haman, and later again saving his people from Haman's decree. Esther performs a lengthy prayer to gain favor with the king and overcome the evil plans of Haman in Targum Rishon 5:1, and so forth. Furthermore, Esther now performs a variety of Jewish practices, including the observance of Shabbat and the festivals, and she follows menstrual restrictions and food regulations. References are also made to Abraham, Jacob, and Isaac to link Israel to their past.

== Manuscripts ==
The earliest manuscripts of Targum Rishon range between the 14th and 16th centuries. They are known from Spain, France, Italy and Algeria.

== See also ==
- Rabbinic literature
