= Targum Sheni =

Aramaic elaboration of Esther

The Targum Sheni, also known as the Second Targum of Esther, is an Aramaic translation (targum) and elaboration of the Book of Esther. Notably, the biblical account is embellished with a considerable amount of new apocryphal material in this book.

The text is sometimes referred to as the Second Targum of Esther to contrast it with another shorter targum on the Book of Esther: Targum Rishon, or the First Targum of Esther. The relationship and similarities between the two have been an important focus of research by scholars.

== Differences from the Book of Esther ==
The Jewish Encyclopedia characterizes the story as a "genuine and exuberant midrash", i.e. a free elaboration, of a kind not unusual in Rabbinic literature.

One notable addition to the story involves King Solomon holding a feast for the daunting army of animals, birds and demonic spirits he has as subjects. But the woodcock refuses to attend, on the grounds that Solomon is inferior to the Queen of Sheba. Solomon sends for the Queen, and houses her in a room made of glass, through which he reveals that she has a hairy foot. She demands from him the answer to three riddles before she will pay homage:

- A cistern of wood; buckets of water; they draw up stones; they cause water to flow. — A tube of cosmetic eye-paint.
- What is the thing which comes as dust from the earth, eats dust, is poured out as water, and sticks to the house? — Naphtha.
- What is that which acts as an oracle (or as a storm), goes at the head of all, cries loudly and bitterly with its head bowed down like a rush, is a cause of praise to the free, of shame to the poor, of honour to the dead, of disgrace to the living, of joy to the birds, and of grief to the fish? — Flax.

Solomon solves the riddles, and the two exchange gifts. The riddles are noteworthy examples of Hebrew Riddles.

== Manuscripts ==
In addition, there are fifteen manuscripts from the text known between the 12th and 15th centuries (known from Europe, especially Italy, and Yemen), the earliest dating to 1189.

== Date ==
In the 19th century, scholars proposed a range of dates, from Gelbhaus who placed it as early as the 4th century, Cassel who placed it in the 6th, and Munk who placed it in the 11th. The 11th century appeared as the upper limit because Rabbi Elʿazar in this time is known to have made use of the text. Likewise, it has been shown to depend on (and therefore post-date) the Babylonian Talmud.

The present consensus is that Targum Sheni dates somewhere between the late Byzantine period to the early Islamic period. Grossfeld places it in the early seventh century but before Islam based on its description of Rome as being swept away in favor of the son of David, but others have observed that this argument depends on a reading present in only one manuscript. Iafrate argued for 10th century date based on resemblances to texts composed from that era, including the De Ceremoniis and Midrash Abba Gorion. The Encyclopaedia Judaica entry on the text favors a 7th-to-8th century date based on the linguistic features of the (Galilean) Aramaic text, like its selection of Greek loan words. Kalimi prefers a pre-Islamic date due to the texts knowledge of Christian ideas, anti-Christian disputes, Greek words, and Roman names, but a concurrent lack of knowledge of parallel Islamic/anti-Islamic notions, and a lack of post-Islamic anachronisms. Generally, recent scholarship has favored a pre-Islamic date. Based on a comparative analysis of parallel versions of a story of Solomon in Targum Sheni and the Quran, Zishan Ghaffar concluded that the account in the Quran presupposes the existence of the Targum Sheni account, indicating it is pre-Islamic.

== Targum Sheni and the Quran ==
=== Parallels ===
Researchers in the field of Quranic studies have observed a number of notable parallels between the Targum Sheni account and the Qur'anic account of Solomon and the Queen in Surah 27:15–44. According to Q 27:16–17, after Solomon took the throne after David, he was taught the "speech of birds" and had an army involving "jinn, humans, and birds". Likewise, Targum Sheni 1:3 also asserts right after describing Solomon taking the throne that he had the obedience of "devils, demons, and ferocious beasts, evil spirits and accidents" and that all sorts of animals, fish, birds and so forth of their own will came to him to be slaughtered for him to eat. The Quranic account continues about Solomon: "Then he inspected the birds, and said, “Why do I not see the hoopoe? Or is he among the absentees? I will punish him most severely, or slay him, unless he gives me a valid excuse"" (vv. 20-21). Similarly, Targum Sheni proceeds soon after the previous quote: “At that time, the cock of the wood was missed among the fowls, and was not found. Then the king commanded in anger that he should appear before him, or else he would destroy him." Next, the Quran talks about how the fowl returned to Solomon and reported to him his finding of a kingdom named Sheba with a woman as its leader who has everything and has a mighty throne, but who also worships the sun instead of God (vv. 22-25). Likewise in Targum Sheni, the cock returns to Solomon and reports to him that he has found a kingdom with a woman as its leader, the "Queen of Saba", and that this kingdom has virtually endless resources and whose people worship the sea rather than God. Both accounts proceed by having the bird go to the kingdom again and sending a letter to the Queen of Saba, commanding her to submit to Solomon’s rule otherwise an army will be sent out to destroy her and her kingdom. Both accounts then proceed by stating that the Queen of Saba, not understanding what she ought to do, appealed to her council for advice. In the Qur’an the council tells her that it’s her decision but in Targum Sheni it also becomes her decision but because she does not trust her council. In both accounts, the Queen of Saba proceeds to send Solomon envoys of gifts. Both accounts proceed by saying that the Queen of Saba decides to proceed and go before Solomon, and she submits before him and ends up worshipping the one true God.

=== Relationship ===
The exact nature of the relationship is impacted by which of the two texts is earlier. While the Quran is well-placed in the early seventh century, dates for Targum Sheni range considerably and hypothesis involve both pre-Islamic and post-Islamic dates. Some scholars who view the Quran as earlier still believe that Targum Sheni incorporates pre-existing Jewish and folkloric traditions, perhaps including sixth-century Christian input, which were closer to those presented in the Targum Sheni. The most recent opinion is that the Quran presupposes the narrative found in the Targum Sheni.

== Editions and translations ==
- Bernard Grossfeld, The Two Targums of Esther, Liturgical Press, 1991.

== See also ==
- Apocryphal Additions to Esther - Jewish Encyclopedia
- An explanatory commentary on Esther. Contains a translation of Targum Sheni in Appendix 1.
