= The Story of Ruth =

1960 film by Henry Koster

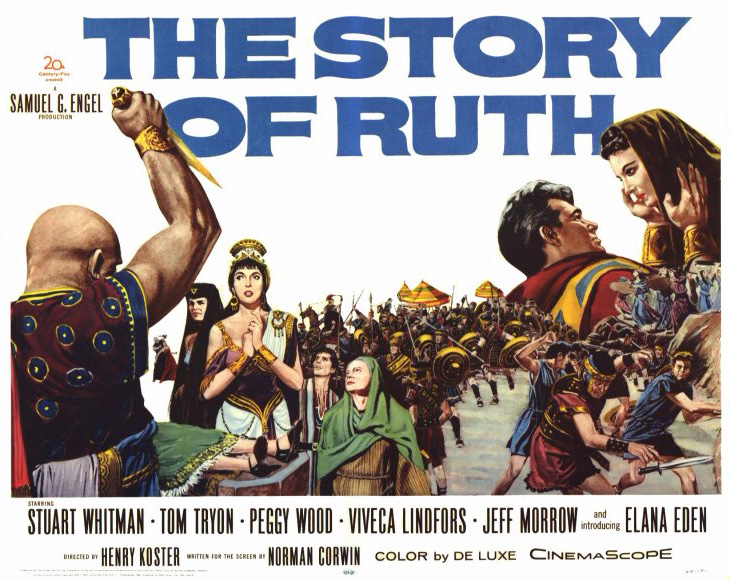
- Original theatrical release poster
- Directed by: Henry Koster
- Written by: Norman Corwin
- Based on: Book of Ruth
- Produced by: Samuel G. Engel
- Starring: Elana Eden; Stuart Whitman; Tom Tryon; Peggy Wood; Viveca Lindfors; Jeff Morrow
- Narrated by: Eduard Franz
- Cinematography: Arthur E. Arling
- Edited by: Jack W. Holmes
- Music by: Franz Waxman
- Production company: Samuel G. Engel Productions
- Distributed by: 20th Century Fox
- Release date: June 17, 1960
- Running time: 132 minutes
- Country: United States
- Language: English
- Budget: $2.93 million
- Box office: $3 million (US/Canada rentals)

The Story of Ruth is a 1960 American historical romance film directed by Henry Koster, shot in CinemaScope and DeLuxe Color, and released by 20th Century Fox. The screenplay, written by Norman Corwin, is an adaptation of the biblical Book of Ruth. The film stars Stuart Whitman as Boaz, Tom Tryon as Mahlon, Peggy Wood as Naomi, Viveca Lindfors as Eleilat, Jeff Morrow as Tob, and introduces 19-year-old Elana Eden as Ruth.

== Plot ==
At approximately 8 years old, Ruth is sold by her father, as his strongest and prettiest daughter, to a priest of Chemosh, to be trained in the service of the Moabite deity. Months later, deemed the most attractive and unblemished candidate, Ruth is selected from a lineup of child priestesses in training to be sacrificed during the annual ritual to Chemosh. As soon as she is selected, a large blemish appears on Ruth's arm, and she is deemed unsuitable. Another child is sacrificed in her place.

Years later, Ruth is a favored priestess serving as spiritual teacher of a young Moabite girl, Tevah, being prepared for that year's sacrifice to Chemosh. Unhappy with the ritual crown created for Tebah, high-priestess Eleilat, along with Ruth, instruct Mahlon, a Judean artisan, to revamp the crown with jewels and glitter. Mahlon delivers the crown to Ruth at the temple, and he begins to question her about the existence of Chemosh. Ruth starts out mocking Mahlon's “invisible god,” but ends up becoming intrigued and doubtful of her religion as time draws near for Tebah's sacrifice. Ruth ultimately falls in love with Mahlon and disgraces herself at Tebah's sacrifice by screaming in horror as the child is ceremonially stabbed on an altar by the high priest. Ruth flees but is captured and punished.

The Moabites blame and condemn Mahlon, his father Elimelech, and brother Chilion for Ruth's heresy. Chilion and Elimelech die in the prison, while Mahlon is condemned to the quarries for life. Ruth comes with mercenaries to free Mahlon, but he is mortally wounded as he flees the quarry. He marries Ruth in a cave soon afterwards, and promptly dies. Naomi (married to Elimelech), Orpah (married to Chilion), and Ruth are now widowed. Orpah returns to her Moabite family, and Ruth chooses to accompany Naomi to Bethlehem, famously proclaiming "Whither thou goest, I will go.”

Moav and Judah are ancient enemies, and Ruth is initially met with hostility. Upon arrival, they witness Boaz, a close kinsman of Elimelech's, punish a Moabite who has poisoned a water hole by forcing him to drink the poisoned water. When Boaz learns that Naomi has returned, he sends provisions to them, respecting his obligation as a kinsman. Believing Boaz to be fiercely anti-Moabite, Ruth compels Naomi to refuse the provisions. Captivated by Ruth's beauty, Boaz arranges for another kinsman, Tov, to take Boaz's provisions to Naomi and Ruth. Tob initially doesn't want to oblige, but after seeing Ruth, Tov agrees to Boaz's arrangement, taking credit for generosity. A wise Naomi is skeptical of Tob's uncharacteristic caring. Meanwhile, Boaz visits Naomi and Ruth to convince them to accept his help. After Boaz assists Ruth against a mob of hostile women at a well, Ruth becomes aware of his noble nature. Eventually, Boaz and Ruth fall in love, but Tob claims his right under the Jewish Laws to marry Mahlon's widow as closest kinsman.

Two Moab agents arrive in Judah seeking Ruth. Pretending to be from Reuben, they claim to have witnessed Ruth worshipping Chemosh in secret at Naomi's farm. As a member of the Council of Elders, Boaz must sit in judgment of Ruth. At trial, Ruth admits to having been a Moabite priestess who last participated in ritual sacrifice only months before, shocking those in attendance—including Boaz, who does his best to defend her. The Moabite agents are exposed as false witnesses when Naomi asks them to name the 12 tribes of Israel and Ruth asks them to recite the Ten Commandments, which they cannot do. Nor will they bless Jehovah and curse Chemosh, as Ruth challenges. Ruth is acquitted.

Tob refuses to give up his claim to Ruth, despite her informing him that she loves Boaz. Naomi suggests to Ruth a way out of her obligation to marry Tob. At their wedding ceremony, Ruth informs Tob in front of the guests that she sought out Boaz where he was sleeping at the harvest festival. Humiliated, Tob renounces Ruth. Boaz then declares he will marry Ruth, and both declare to the officiating elder that only vows of love passed between them. They are married, becoming the progenitors of a great king and a prophet who many worship as the messiah.

== Cast ==
- Elana Eden as Ruth
- Stuart Whitman as Boaz
- Tom Tryon as Mahlon
- Peggy Wood as Naomi
- Viveca Lindfors as Eleilat
- Jeff Morrow as Tob
- Thayer David as Hedak
- Les Tremayne as Presiding Elder
- Eduard Franz as Jehoam
- Leo Fuchs as Sochin
- Lili Valenty as Kera
- John Gabriel as Chilion
- Ziva Rodann as Orpah
- Basil Ruysdael as Shammah
- John Banner as King of Moab
- Adelina Pedroza as Iduma
- Daphna Einhorn as Tebah
- Sara Taft as Eska
- Jean Inness as Hagah
- Berry Kroeger as Huphim
- Jon Silo as Tacher
- Don Diamond as Yomar

== Production ==
=== Development and writing ===
In February 1952, film director Herbert Kline bought a screenplay titled Song of Ruth, written by Frank and Doris Hursley. Kline had already signed Aline MacMahon for the part of Naomi and was looking for film stars to play the roles of Ruth and Boaz. He planned to film the story that summer in color and on location in Israel. Noel Langley, Maxwell Anderson, and Frank G. Slaughter wrote new scripts for producer Charles K. Feldman. Slaughter wrote a novel based on his script and the ones written by Kline, the Hursleys, Langley, and Anderson. Feldman gave Slaughter the publication rights to all of the scripts and the novel was published in 1954 as The Song of Ruth: A Love Story from the Old Testament.

In November 1956, The Song of Ruth was one of 20th Century-Fox's special pictures and had not yet been assigned to a specific producer. In September 1957, The New York Times announced that The Story of Ruth was one of the five films Samuel G. Engel was preparing as an independent producer at Fox. Engel hired Shimon Wincelberg to write the film's screenplay. By January 1958, the script had been reassigned to Michael and Fay Kanin, who only wrote treatments for the film. The following month, The Song of Ruth was mentioned as one of Fox's religious projects and future releases.

Murray Schumach wrote a special article on the film for The New York Times. In it, he revealed that the story of Ruth had been avoided for years by Fox producers because they did not know how to build up its box-office appeal, even though treatments for it had been prepared by "skilled writers". Engel told Schumach that he initially found it difficult to turn the story into a film: "It is a sweet pastoral love story. It has an underlying theme of tolerance. It has the beauty of a lovely tone poem. But even if it was blown up, I couldn't see it as a movie." Engel then considered adapting the story into a musical film. He said, "I saw it as a movie with music. Boaz would be an older man, like Ezio Pinza in South Pacific with music by Rodgers and Hammerstein. It could be beautiful, I thought. Boaz could sing something like 'Some Enchanted Evening.' But then I figured it would be dull and I backed away from it."

Fox continued to receive several film treatments and each time the studio offered Engel the chance to produce the film. Norman Corwin began writing a new screenplay in July 1958. Corwin's main challenge was to add dramatic conflict to the story. Engel was interested in the Old Testament and Jewish commentaries on the Bible, so he thought he and Corwin had to write their own midrash on the Book of Ruth. Corwin's script includes material from Slaughter's novelization of previous drafts of the screenplay. In both adaptations, Ruth is depicted as a priestess of Chemosh who renounces her idolatry after marrying Mahlon, a metalsmith. When Mahlon dies, Ruth and her widowed mother-in-law relocate to the land of Judah. In the Bible, Mahlon's unnamed nearest kinsman relinquishes his right to buy the field of the two widows because he does not want to "mar" his own inheritance. In Slaughter's book and Corwin's screenplay, the kinsman is named Tob and he desires Ruth and intends to marry her. The novel's Tob later rejects Ruth and accuses her of being a spy, but in the final script Tob renounces his claim to Ruth on their wedding day after she tells him she does not love him and prefers Boaz. Engel and Corwin had a free hand in creating an on-screen Moabite culture due of the limited knowledge of the ancient kingdom of Moab.

In January 1959, the film's working title was The Loves of Ruth and Engel hired Eleanore Griffin to write additional dialogue for Corwin's screenplay. In July, Henry Koster was hired to direct the film. Corwin submitted his final draft of the script on September 1, and he completed the 149-page shooting script on November 24, 1959. Engel said, "It is all treated with the greatest respect, of course. After all, you must remember that Ruth was the great-grandmother of David and an ancestor of Jesus."

=== Casting ===
In October 1958, Sophia Loren and Haya Harareet were the two top choices for the role of Ruth. In August 1959, Ernst Lubitsch's daughter, Nicola, made a screen test for 20th Century-Fox. Susan Strasberg, another contender for the role, was tested that same month. Other actresses who tested for the role were Susan Kohner, Tina Louise, Diane Baker, and Millie Perkins. Engel saw the screen test of Israeli actress Elana Cooper for the role of Anne Frank in The Diary of Anne Frank and Cooper was flown to London to make a test for Ruth. (Note: Owen McLean, 20th Century-Fox's casting director, went to Tel Aviv to look for a young woman for the title role in The Diary of Anne Frank. One of three Israeli actresses considered for the part, Cooper made a screen test that consisted of 50 feet of black-and-white film and a taped recording of her reading dialogue from the screenplay. She did not get the role. Two years later, after screen-testing 29 actresses for Ruth, Engel and Koster viewed the screen tests for The Diary of Anne Frank and discovered Cooper.) She was known as "that girl from Israel with the biblical face." Cooper's London screen test was successful and she was invited to Hollywood for more tests. In September, Cooper and Swedish actress Ulla Jacobsson arrived in Los Angeles to test for the role. Myrna Fahey, who had recently signed a contract with Fox, was also tested. Columnist Mike Connolly reported that Fox was "having as much trouble casting a big star for Cleopatra as it is finding an unknown for The Story of Ruth." Connolly also said that Fox was spending $6,000 per screen test and that Jacobsson was one of the top choices. By October, Joan Collins and Nina Shipman had also made screen tests. More than 300 actresses were interviewed and 29 were given special screen tests. In early October 1959, Cooper was selected for the role of Ruth and her surname was changed to Eden. "They gave me a new name," she told reporter Bob Thomas. "My real name is Cooper, but that sounded too English. They wanted me to have something that sounded more Jewish. So they picked Eden, because it is mentioned in the Bible." She also signed a "term pact" with the studio.

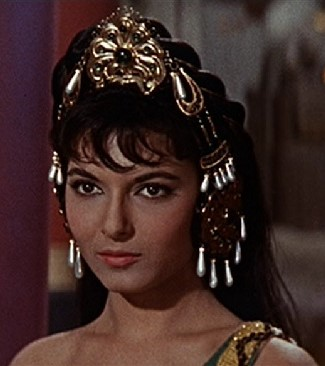
Elana Eden as Ruth

This is Elana Eden, whom Buddy Adler, Henry Koster, and I have selected to portray the coveted title role in The Story of Ruth. Elana Eden comes to us from the Holy Land following worldwide search in which literally over a score of young, talented actresses were tested. Elana is a graduate from the renowned Habima Theatre. She was chosen by us because we feel she possesses the necessary qualifications for this exacting role and because of her natural qualities, which most faithfully exemplify this beloved biblical heroine.

— Samuel G. Engel, in a 7-minute preview of the film

Helen Hayes and Irene Dunne were offered the role of Naomi before Peggy Wood was cast. Wood accepted the role without reading the script because she already knew the Bible story. The Story of Ruth was Wood's first Hollywood film in 12 years.

In November 1959, New York stage actor John Gabriel was signed for the part of Chilion, and Israeli actress Ziva Rodann was signed to play Chilion's wife, Orpah. Later that month, Viveca Lindfors joined the cast.

The 20th Century-Fox studio assigned the role of Boaz to its contract actor Stephen Boyd, but Boyd turned it down. He denied rumors that said he refused the part because he did not like the script or did not want to act in another "costume spectacle" after Ben-Hur. Boyd's reason was that he did not think he was right for the role: "I'm an actor who knows exactly what I'm capable of playing. I'm not ready for the role of Boaz. If someone asked me today to star in a film version of Hamlet, I'd say the same thing—'I'm not ready.' I wouldn't know what to do with Hamlet, and I don't know what to do with Boaz. I think the picture would be much better without me. It's a good script—a great script. It's a great role—for someone else, not me." (Note: Boyd later played Nimrod in John Huston's The Bible: In the Beginning... (1966), another biblical epic released by 20th Century-Fox.) After Boyd chose not to play it, the part of Boaz was offered to Tom Tryon, who had already been cast in the role of Mahlon, Ruth's first husband. Tryon declined the offer and preferred to play the role of Mahlon. He said, "I did appreciate the fact they thought so much of me, but the role of Mahlon is one I feel particularly close to. He's an artist, a goldsmith, and I'm somewhat of a Sunday painter and cartoonist myself. When I read the script, my first thought was, 'Thank goodness, at last I'm off a horse!' I had just played 11 Slaughter segments and had been in a saddle for nearly six months. If I'd taken the Boaz role, it would have been just like playing another sagebrush hero, only in mid-east clothes. He's on a horse through half the picture." Stuart Whitman replaced Boyd as Boaz in December 1959.

=== Filming ===
Production began in late November 1959 and ended in mid-February 1960.

Tom Tryon described co-star Elana Eden as a "young Gina Lollobrigida." Koster asked Eden to control her eyebrow movements during filming. "They just reflect my emotions," she said in an interview with Erskine Johnson. "I don't like to depend on technique. I like my emotions to take over from my technique." Koster said of Eden, "She's a natural actress, a highly emotional one—whose only problem is to control her emotions." The scene where Ruth is bullied at the well required multiple takes. Eden remembered, "I had to do a 'fall' scene 14 times when a mob was assailing me, 'beating' me to the ground. After each take, the assistants rushed over to make sure that I hadn't been hurt in the fall. I had not—I fell as relaxed as a bouncing ball."

In May 1960, Engel said he would probably reteam Eden and Tryon in his next Fox project, The King Must Die, a $5,000,000 film adaptation of Mary Renault's novel about Theseus. He planned to follow The King Must Die with Joshua, a sequel to Cecil B. DeMille's The Ten Commandments with Tryon playing the title role.

== Release ==
On June 17, 1960, The Story of Ruth premiered at the Paramount Theatre in New York City and on June 30, 1960, in Beverly Hills at the Fox Wilshire Theatre.

In 2006, 20th Century Fox Home Entertainment released The Story of Ruth on DVD with special features, including a preview, a trailer, and several Movietone News shorts concerning the film.

In 2013, the DVD was re-released with new cover art but the same features as the 2006 release.

== Reception ==
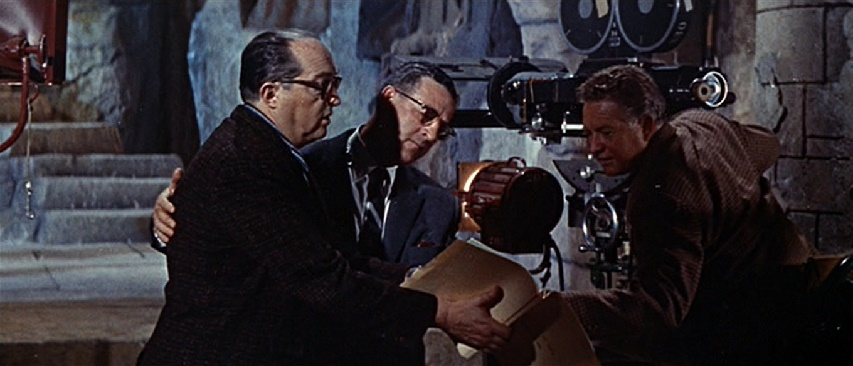
Director Henry Koster, producer Samuel G. Engel, and cameraman Arthur Arling on the set of The Story of Ruth.

The Story of Ruth received favorable reviews upon release. Time considered the film "commendably unepic". Variety called it "a refreshingly sincere and restrained Biblical drama, a picture that elaborates on the romantic, political and devotional difficulties encountered by the Old Testament heroine". Daniel A. Poling, editor of The Christian Herald, described the film as "[g]loriously cast and faultlessly directed".

Critics also commended the film's leading female stars. Variety wrote that Elana Eden's portrayal is "a performance of dignity", projecting "an inner strength through a delicate veneer", and also noted Peggy Wood's "excellent characterization of Naomi" and said that her "timing is always sharp". Carl Lane, writing for the Evening Independent, praised Eden's performance: "[…] a flesh and blood Ruth of passion and compassion, of tenderness and dignity, a woman of whom the viewer tells himself on leaving the theater: 'This is Ruth as she must have been. She could have been no other.'" Lane also thought that Wood "creates an unforgettable character [as Naomi]. Patience, faith, wisdom, all mature within her as the story progresses." Poling believed Eden's portrayal of Ruth was "worthy of an Oscar". Of both performances, Boxoffice wrote: "This personal and human tale benefits by the realistic portrayals of the beautiful Israeli actress Miss Eden and the mature Miss Wood, who play together with touching affinity."

Bosley Crowther, the New York Times critic, gave the film a sardonically negative review. He opined that Corwin's adaptation was "circumspect and dull." According to Crowther, Ruth's backstory could have been "something softly feminine and romantic" rather than the "somewhat metallic former high priestess of a pagan theology" that Corwin turned her into. He included the phrase "stiff and pompous" twice in his review.

== Awards ==
The Story of Ruth won:

- The Hollywood Foreign Press Association's Best Picture of the Month Award for July 1960. The bronze plaque was scheduled to be presented to producer Samuel G. Engel at the Greater Los Angeles Press Club on July 27, with director Henry Koster and stars Elana Eden and Tom Tryon also present.
- The Parents' Magazine Family Award Medal for July 1960. The award was described by Movietone News as "one of the most sought-after accolades that can be awarded to film drama". Elana Eden and 20th Century Fox president Spyros Skouras attended the award presentation, which was filmed by Movietone News.

== Adaptation ==
The story was adapted as a comic book, "Dell Four Color #1144 (September 1960)".
