= The Book of Ruth: Journey of Faith =

- Directed by: Stephen Patrick Walker
- Written by: Salvatore DiSalvatore; Richard Raucci; Stephen Patrick Walker
- Cinematography: Dave Selle
- Edited by: Peter Sassi
- Music by: Dennis Therrian
- Production company: Reel Frog Films
- Distributed by: Pure Flix Entertainment
- Release date: December 15, 2009
- Country: United States
- Language: English

The Book of Ruth: Journey of Faith is a 2009 Christian film directed by Stephen Patrick Walker. It is based on the Book of Ruth, and was aired January 8, 2010 on the Trinity Broadcasting Network. The film stars Dan Haggerty, Lana Wood, Eleese Lester, Carman, and Sherry Morris as Ruth.

== Plot ==
The Book of Ruth is about a Moabite woman who loses her Israelite husband, her father-in-law, and her brother-in-law. With no men to provide for her and the rest of her family, her mother-in-law decides to set her daughters-in-law free for them to be able to remarry. But Ruth instead opts to stay with her mother-in-law out of the great love that she has for her. They both travel to Israel in hopes of a better harvest and probably even a better life. There Ruth meets Boaz, a man of noble character. He takes care of Ruth by letting her glean on his property and making sure she is safe in his field. Naomi and Ruth then decided to take the situation in their own hands by making Ruth do an certain noble act – laying down near his feet when he was sleeping at the threshing floor. She then asks Boaz to redeem her family and so he does. But, before he gets to do so, he must be able to receive the permission of a closer relative Naomi's family has. In the end, Boaz and Ruth was able to get married and after a while they gave birth to a son whom they named Obed. From Obed's grandson came the line of King David and the royal house.

== Cast ==
- Sherry Morris as Ruth
- Carman as Boaz
- Eleese Lester as Naomi
- Fred Griffith as Mahlon
- DJ Perry as Benjamin
- Rebecca Holden as Beth
- Dan Haggerty as Simeon
- Lana Wood as Tani

== Release ==
The DVD, which includes bonus featurettes including "The Making Of", "Trailers", and "Commentary", was released December 15.
