= Ruth (biblical figure) =

Protagonist of the Book of Ruth in the Hebrew Bible

Ruth 𐤓𐤅𐤕 רוּת
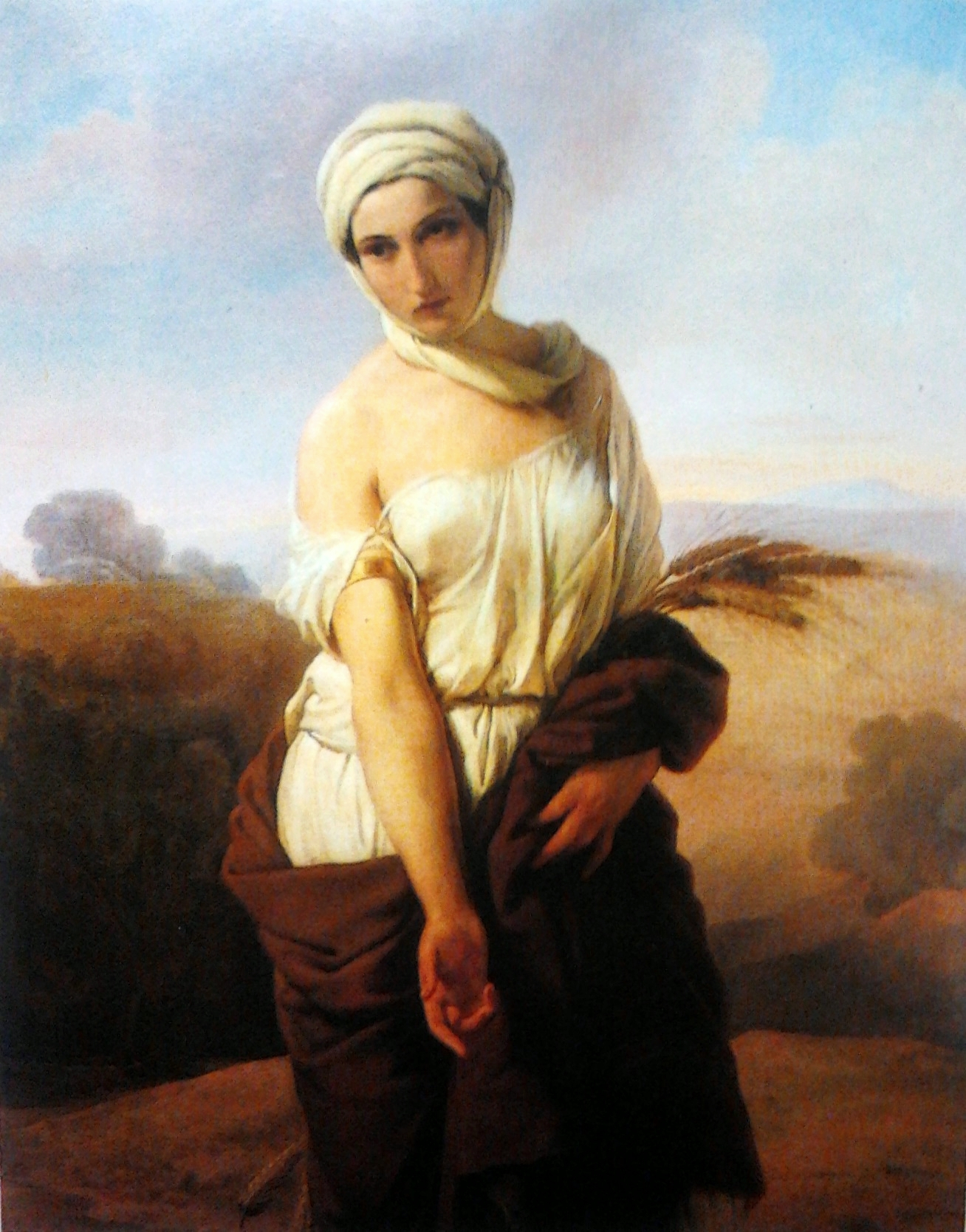
- Ruth by Francesco Hayez, 1835
- Spouses: Mahlon (died); Boaz
- Children: Obed

Ruth (/ruːθ/; Hebrew: רוּת, romanized: rûṯ) was the great-grandmother of David, after whom the Book of Ruth is named. She was a Moabite woman who married an Israelite, Mahlon. After the death of all the male members of her family (her husband, her father-in-law, and her brother-in-law), she stayed with her mother-in-law, Naomi, and moved to Judah with her, where Ruth won the love and protection of a wealthy relative, Boaz, through her kindness.

The story of Ruth as told in the Book of Ruth was likely written in Hebrew during the Persian period (550–330 BCE). Some scholars generally consider the book to be a work of historical fiction, while other scholars, including evangelical scholars, hold that it is a historical narrative written in the form of a short story.

== Book of Ruth ==
In the days when the judges were leading the tribes of Israel, there was a famine. Because of this crisis, Elimelech, a man from Bethlehem in Judah, moved to Moab with his wife, Naomi, and his two sons, Mahlon and Chilion. There Elimelech died, and the two sons married Moabite women, Ruth and Orpah. They lived for about ten years in Moab, before Mahlon and Chilion also died.

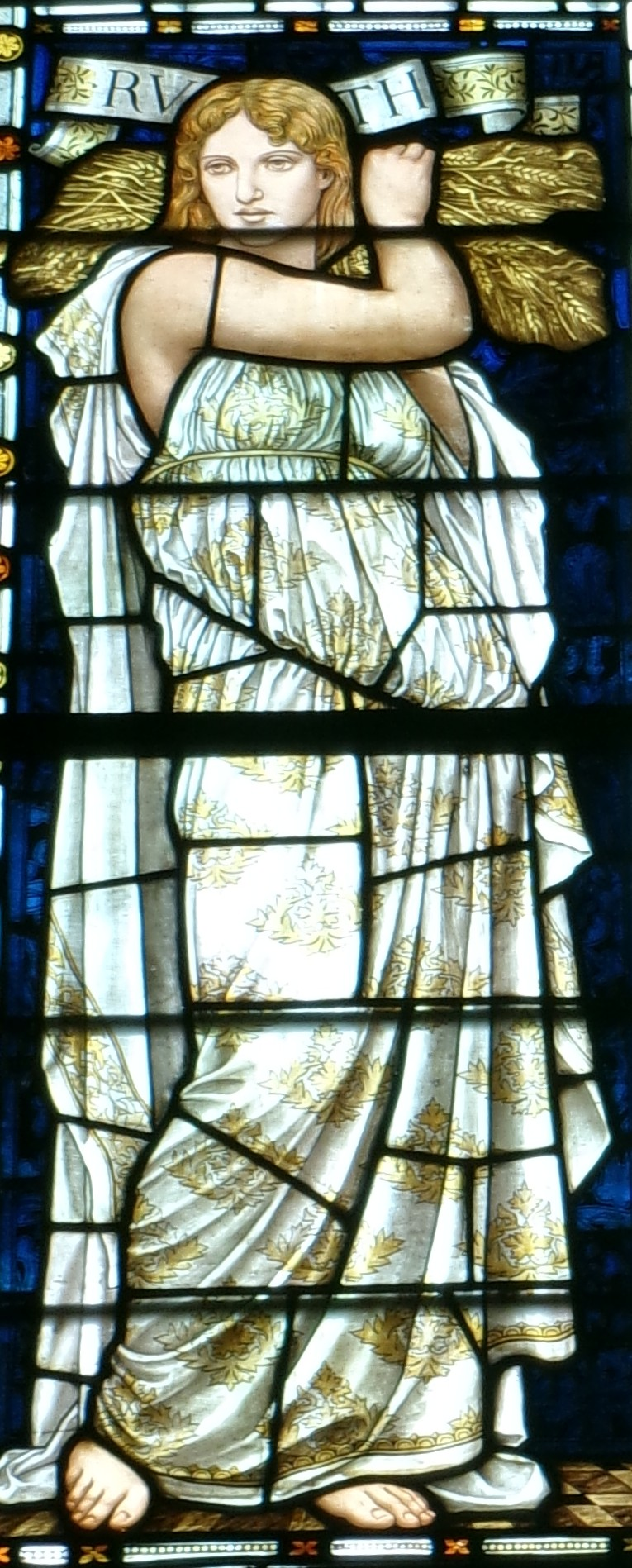
Detail of a stained-glass window by Henry Holiday in Salisbury Cathedral (1880)

Naomi heard that the famine in Judah had passed and decided to return home. She told her daughters-in-law to return to their mothers' houses and marry again. At first, both Orpah and Ruth refused to leave her, but Naomi told them that she was unlikely to have more sons that Orpah and Ruth could marry. They all wept, and Orpah decided to leave Naomi and return to her people. Naomi tried again to send Ruth back, too, but she told her that "(...) where you go I will go, and where you lodge, I will lodge. Your people shall be my people, and your God my God. Where you die I will die, and there will I be buried." (ESV) In the Targum, each of Ruth's lines is preceded by Naomi, who defines what it is to be Jewish.

Eventually, Naomi and Ruth arrived in Bethlehem at the beginning of the barley harvest. Boaz, a relative of Elimelech, lived nearby, and Ruth decided to go to his field and glean after his reapers. When Boaz arrived at the field, he asked who the young woman was, and then told Ruth not to go to anyone else's field, but keep gleaning there. He told her that if she was thirsty, she could drink from the vessels of the female reapers, but to avoid the men. When Ruth asked him why he was so good to a foreigner, Boaz told her that he had heard how loyal she was to Naomi. At mealtime, Boaz invited Ruth to eat with him, and then instructed his male reapers to not reproach or rebuke her, and even to pull out some barley from their bundles and leave it for her to glean. Ruth gleaned at the fields of Boaz throughout the barley and wheat harvests.

When the harvest ended, and Boaz was winnowing barley at night at the threshing floor, Naomi advised Ruth to wash and anoint herself, go to the threshing floor, and when Boaz had lain down to sleep, uncover his feet and lie down there. Ruth did as she said. At midnight, Boaz woke up, and Ruth asked him to protect her, as he was her husband's goel, closest relative tasked with protecting his rights. Boaz said that he would like to do so, but Ruth had an even closer relative than him.

In the morning, Boaz went and sat down by the gates of the town, then talked to the relative when he arrived. He told him that Naomi was selling Elimelech's land. The man said that he would redeem it. Boaz then says that one of them will acquire Ruth, although the text is unclear due to a Qere and Ketiv disagreement. In the Qere, spoken form, the relative would acquire Ruth. In the Ketiv, written form, Boaz would acquire Ruth. In both cases, it would be to perpetuate the name of the dead in his inheritance in a levirate marriage. The man refused to redeem the land, fearing that it would impair his own inheritance. Boaz then redeemed the land and acquired Ruth. Ruth became Boaz's wife, and bore him a son. After Ruth had given birth, Naomi took the child to her breast. The women of Bethlehem named him Obed and said that Naomi had borne a son. Obed became the father of Jesse, the father of King David.

== Religious interpretations ==
=== Jewish perspectives ===
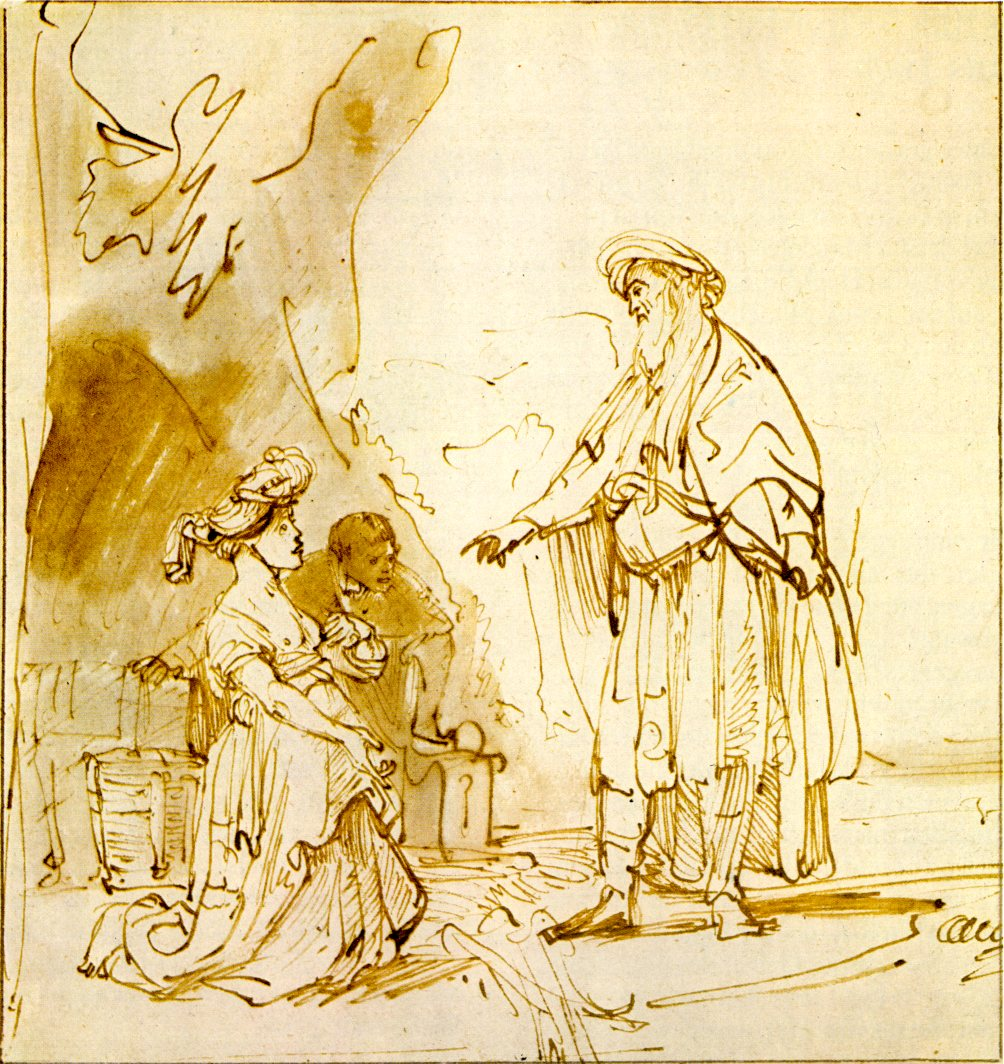
Boaz and Ruth by Rembrandt

Boaz of Judah blessed Ruth for her extraordinary kindness both to Naomi of Judah and to the Judean People (Ruth 3:10). "And he [Boaz] said, 'May you be blessed of the Lord, my daughter; your latest act of kindness is greater than the first, not to follow the young men, whether poor or rich.'" Commentary of Rashi (c. 1040–1105) regarding the first act of kindness: "that you did with your mother-in-law".

Ruth's kindness as noted in the Book of Ruth by Boaz is seen in the Jewish Tradition as in rare contradistinction to the peoples of Moab (where Ruth comes from) and Amon in general, who were noted by the Torah for their distinct lack of kindness. Deut. 23:5: "Because they [the peoples of Amon and Moab] did not greet you with bread and water on the way when you left Egypt, and because he [the people of Moab] hired Balaam the son of Beor from Pethor in Aram Naharaim against you, to curse you." Rashi notes regarding Israel's travels on the way: "when you were in [a state of] extreme exhaustion."

According to the Ruth Rabbah, Ruth was Orpah's sister and the two were daughters of Eglon, the king of Moab; according to the same text, Eglon was the son of Balak. Tamar Meir of the Jewish Women's Archive writes that Ruth and David being descended from these two men is seen as a "reward" for them. For Balak, it is his reward for building altars and for Eglon, it is his reward for "arising upon hearing the name of God from Ehud son of Gera". The same text says Ruth did not convert during her marriage to Mahlon, contradicting other rabbinic literature, which says Ruth formally converted to Judaism for the sake of marrying Mahlon but did not fully accept the faith until later.

Josephus viewed the Book of Ruth as historical and referenced it in his Antiquities of the Jews. Yitzhak Berger suggests Naomi's plan was that Ruth seduce Boaz, just as Tamar and Lot's daughters all seduced "an older family member in order to become the mother of his offspring". At the crucial moment, however, "Ruth abandons the attempt at seduction and instead requests a permanent, legal union with Boaz."

=== Christian perspectives ===
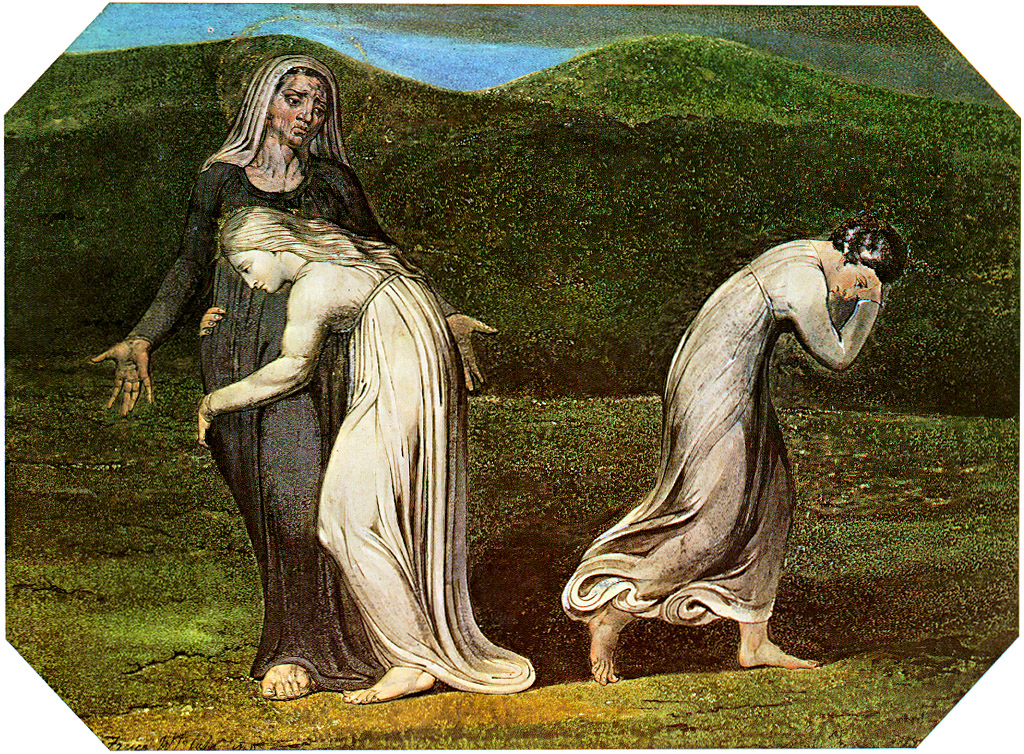
Ruth and Naomi by William Blake

Ruth is one of five women mentioned in the genealogy of Jesus found in the Gospel of Matthew, alongside Tamar, Rahab, the "wife of Uriah" (Bathsheba), and Mary. Katharine Doob Sakenfeld argues that Ruth is a model of loving-kindness (hesed): she acts in ways that promote the well-being of others. In Ruth 1:8–18, she demonstrated hesed by not going back to Moab but accompanying her mother-in-law to a foreign land. She chose to glean, despite the danger she faced in the field (Ruth 2:15) and the lower social status of the job. Finally, Ruth agrees with Naomi's plan to marry Boaz, even though she was free of family obligations, once again demonstrating her loyalty and obedience (Ruth 3:10).

Barry Webb argues that in the book, Ruth plays a key role in Naomi's rehabilitation.

Ruth is commemorated as a matriarch in the Calendar of Saints of the Lutheran Church–Missouri Synod on 16 July.

She can also be seen as a prototype of a convert to Judaism.

== Tomb of Ruth ==
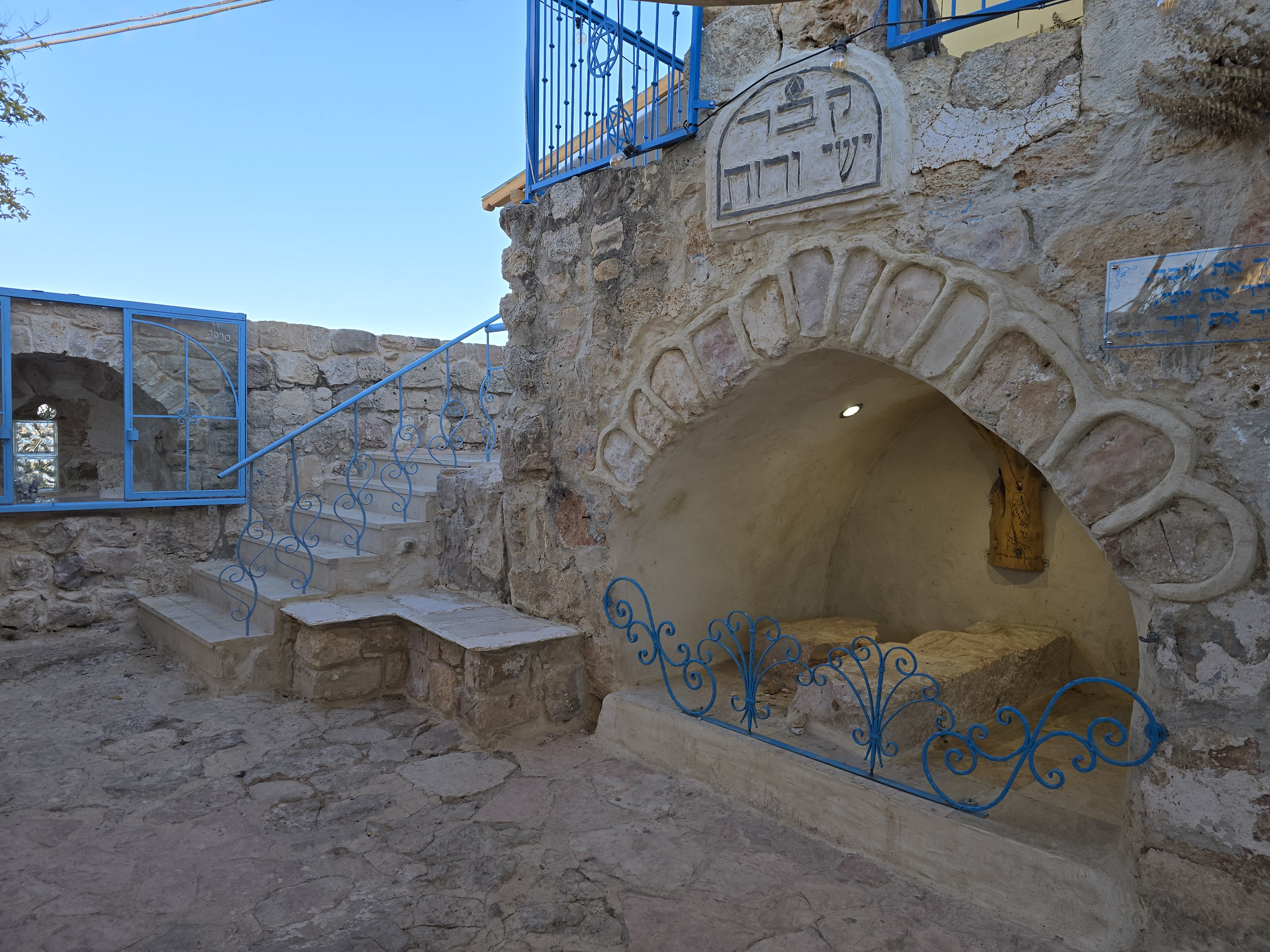
Tomb of Jesse and Ruth in Hebron

The traditional burial place of Ruth is a building located in Hebron. Francesco Quaresmi in the early 17th century reported that Turks and Orientals generally believed the structure contained the tombs of Jesse and Ruth. According to Moshe Sharon, the association of the site with Ruth is very late, starting in the 19th century. It receives numerous visitors every year, especially on the Jewish holiday of Shavuot, when the Book of Ruth is read. Haim Horwitz in his 1835 book on Israeli holy sites Love of Jerusalem discusses the oral tradition that the tomb houses Ruth's grave as well as Jesse's, who is mentioned in earlier writings. Menachem Mendel of Kamenitz wrote in 1839, "Also in the vineyard was a shelter with two graves: one of Jesse, father of David, and one of Ruth, the Moabite."

== Cultural influence ==
Ruth is one of the Five Heroines of the Order of the Eastern Star.

Ruth was played by Elana Eden in Henry Koster's The Story of Ruth (1960); the film depicts Ruth as a pagan priestess prior to her religious conversion. Sherry Morris portrayed her in The Book of Ruth: Journey of Faith (2009).

In English literature, John Keats in "Ode to a Nightingale" references Ruth as isolated and grief-stricken when laboring in exile: "Perhaps the self-same song that found a path/Through the sad heart of Ruth, when, sick for home,/She stood in tears amid the alien corn;"

== Genealogy: the descent of David from Ruth ==
Elimelech	Naomi
Boaz	Ruth	Mahlon	Orpah	Chilion
Obed
Jesse
David

== See also ==
- Lives of the Prophets
- Ohel (grave)
