= Elimelech =

Biblical figure in the Book of Ruth

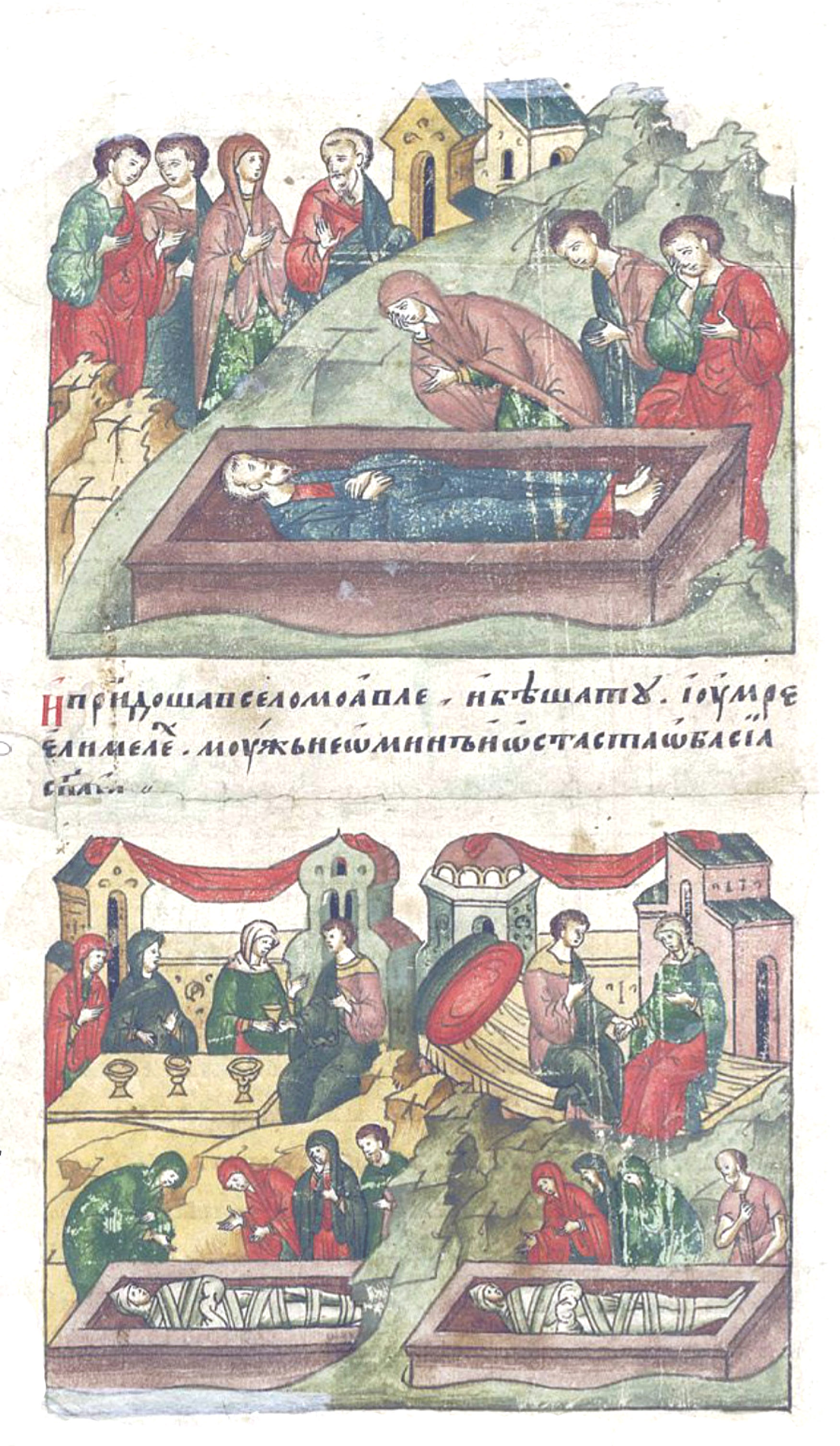
Death of Elimelech and his two sons

Elimelech is a biblical figure mentioned in the Book of Ruth.

According to The Jewish Encyclopedia, Elimelech is a descendant of the Tribe of Judah, and was the husband of Naomi and the father of Machalon and Chilyon. The family lived in Bethlehem in Judea. Due to famine, Elimelech and his family left the Land of Israel and settled in Moab, where he died.

His children, Machalon and Chilyon, married two Moabite women, Ruth and Orpah. When Elimelech's two sons later died, Naomi and Ruth returned to Bethlehem. Ruth later married Boaz, a relative of Elimelech.

== Talmud and Midrash ==
According to the Talmud, Elimelch was the son of Nachshon Ben Aminadav, the Nasi of the Tribe of Judah.

Regarding him and why he left the Land of Israel, Chazal said:

Elimelech was a great man and leader of his generation. When the years of hunger came he said: Now all the Jews will wander from door to door collecting and they'll come to my door. What did he do? He escaped...

When the Book of Ruth recalls his death it states: "Elimelech the husband of Na'ami died". From this Chazal derived that the main consequence of a man's death is to his wife.

From the story of Elimelech, Chazal derived the severity of emigrating from Eretz Yisrael. As they say: Why were Elimelch Machalon and Chilyon punished? For they exited the Land of Israel and entered the Diaspora... for even merit from his ancestry does not stand for individuals who leave Eretz Yisrael".
