= Salmon (biblical figure) =

Biblical figure

Salmon Σαλμών (Koine Greek) שַׂלְמוֹן (hebrew)
- Spouse: Rachab (possibly Rahab of Jericho)
- Children: Boaz
- Father: Nahshon
- Relatives: Obed (granddaughter) Jesse (great-grandson) David (great-great-grandson)

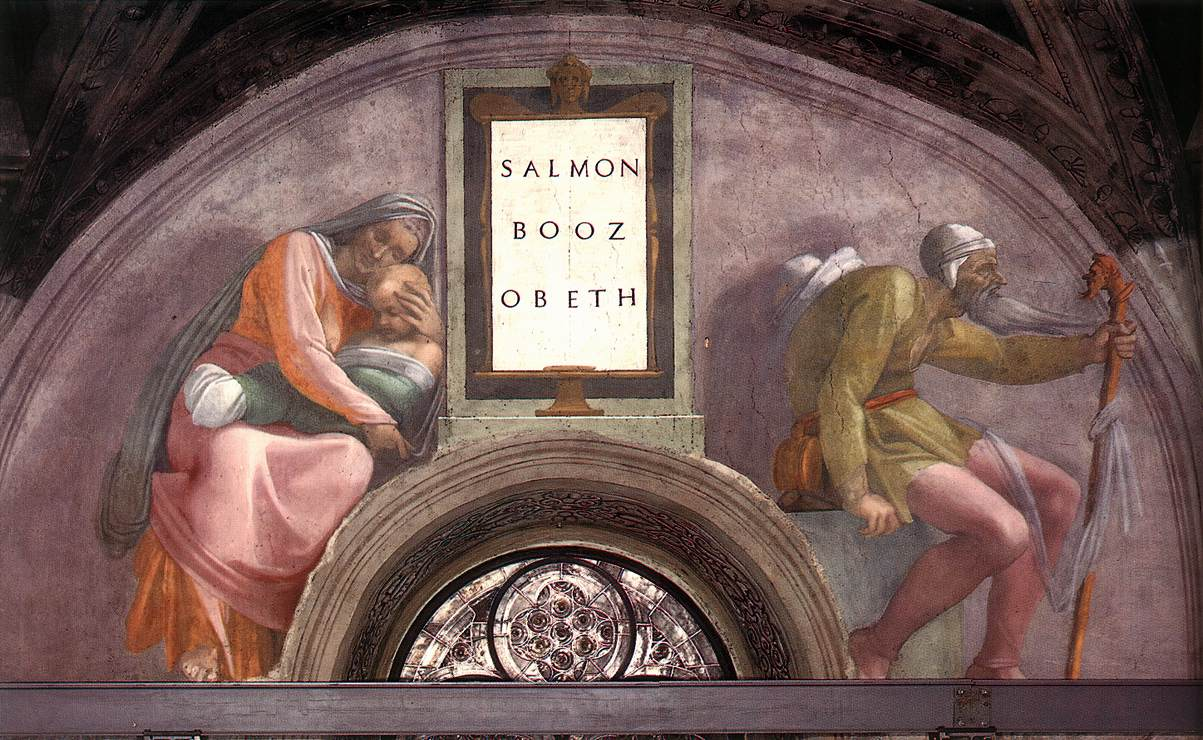
Lunette in the Sistine Chapel of Salmon with Boaz and Obed.

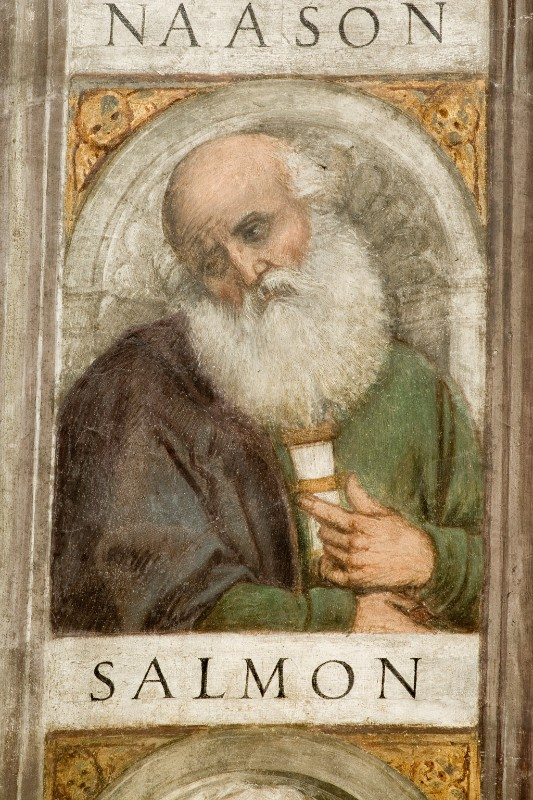
Painting of Salmon by Girolamo Tessari in 1526 in Padova, Church of S Francisco

Salmon (Hebrew: שַׂלְמוֹן Śalmōn) or Salmah (שַׂלְמָה Śalmā, Greek: Σαλμών) is a person mentioned in genealogies in both the Hebrew Scriptures (Old Testament) and in the New Testament.

He was the son of Nahshon. In the New Testament, he married "Rachab" of Matthew 1:5 (possibly Rahab, of Jericho), and Boaz (or Booz) was their son. Thus, according to the biblical genealogies, Salmon is the patrilineal great-great-grandfather of David. Salmon is mentioned in 1 Chronicles (1 Chronicles 2:10–11), the Book of Ruth (Ruth 4:20,21), Matthew 1:4-5, and Luke 3:32. Nahshon was one of the Israelite leaders present with Moses during the exodus from Egypt who undertook a "census of all the congregation of the children of Israel" and therefore Salmon would probably have been a contemporary of Joshua and part of the generation of Israelites who entered the Promised Land.

Rahab's marriage to Salmon is not mentioned in the account of her hiding Joshua's messengers sent out to spy out Jericho.

== See also ==
- Genealogies of Genesis
- Calmet's Dictionary of the Holy Bible, 1832
