= Mahlon and Chilion =

Brothers mentioned in the Book of Ruth

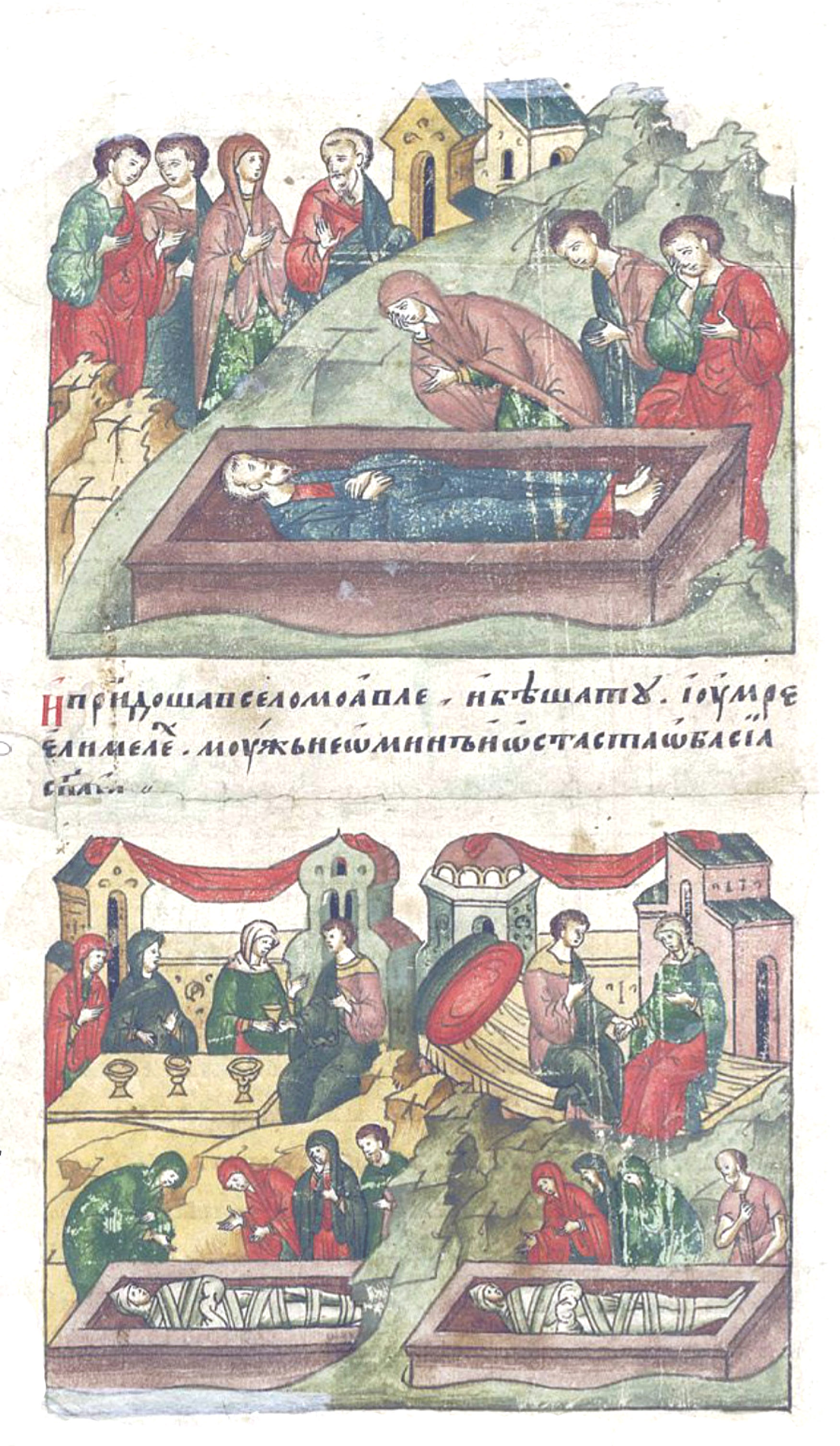
Death of Elimelech and his two sons

Mahlon (Hebrew: מַחְלוֹן Maḥlōn) and Chilion or Kilion (כִּלְיוֹן Kilyōn) were two brothers mentioned in the Book of Ruth. They were the sons of Elimelech (Ephrathite from Beth-lehem-judah) and his wife Naomi. Together with their parents, they settled in the land of Moab during the period of the Israelite Judges. On foreign soil, Mahlon married the Moabite convert Ruth (Ruth 4:10) while Chilion married the Moabite convert Orpah.

== Biography ==
=== The test of childless Ruth and Orpah ===
Elimelech and his sons all died in Moab, leaving Naomi, Ruth, and Orpah widowed. At the time, Ruth and Orpah were childless. Naomi then plans to return to Israel. She tests her daughters-in-law, advising them to return to their respective mothers' households, in drastic violation of Jewish law. This would likely mean readoption of Moabite culture, including idol worship.

=== Ruth in Israel ===
While Orpah returns and leaves Judaism, Ruth chooses to stay with Naomi, thus proving her conversion valid. In Israel, Ruth takes part in a levirate marriage, according to Jewish law. By marrying a relative of Mahlon's, she ensures that Mahlon's paternal lineage is remembered. The nearest relative declines, however, giving the rights to the levite marriage to Boaz, who marries Ruth. Her child, Obed (biologically Boaz's, legally Mahlon's), becomes the paternal grandfather of David ha-Melech (King David).

== Meanings of referenced names ==
Mahlon means "sickness" and Chilion "wasting", which, as is the common theme throughout the scroll, aligns closely with the characters' roles in the relevant events. According to some of modern scholarship, this gives a consciously fairytale-like quality to the story. It also reflects the cultural norm pervasive in Tanakh of naming children based on external events, such as Naomi changing her own name to Mara (“Call me Mara, because the Almighty has dealt quite bitterly with me."), Abram having his name changed to Abraham, Peleg (lit. "division") being named after the division of nations. Mahlon and Chilion being born in a time of famine follows this trend.

Alternatively, The Talmud (Bava Batra 91b) identifies them with Joash and Saraph, mentioned in 1 Chronicles 4:22, then debates which version of names was real and which are symbolic.
