= Mahlon =

Mahlon is a masculine given name. Mahlon was a biblical figure mentioned along with his brother, as Mahlon and Chilion, in the Book of Ruth.

Notable people with this name include:

== Given name ==
=== Business ===
- Mahlon Apgar IV (1941–2023), American government and business consultant
- Mahlon Betts (1795–1867), American entrepreneur and manufacturing figure
- Mahlon Haines (1875–1962), American businessman and philanthropist
- Mahlon Day Sands (1842–1888), American merchant

=== Military ===
- Mahlon Dickerson Manson (1820–1895), American military officer and politician in Indiana
- Mahlon Tisdale (1890–1972), American naval officer

=== Politics ===
- Mahlon Black (1820–1901), American politician in Minnesota
- Mahlon Burwell (1783–1846), surveyor and political figure in Upper Canada
- Mahlon K. Cowan (1863–1917), Canadian lawyer and political figure in Ontario
- Mahlon Dickerson (1770–1853), American politician and judge in New Jersey
- Mahlon M. Garland (1856–1920), American politician in Pennsylvania
- Mahlon Gore (1837–1916), American politician in Florida
- Mahlon Pitney (1858–1924), American lawyer, jurist, and politician
- Mahlon Van Horne (1840–1910), American minister, state legislator in Rhode Island, and diplomat

=== Sports ===
- Mahlon Duckett (1922–2015), American baseball player in the Negro leagues
- Mahlon Higbee (1901–1968), American baseball player
- Mahlon Houkarawa (born 1976), Melanesian footballer from the Solomon Islands
- Mahlon Romeo (born 1995), Antiguan footballer

=== Other ===
- Mahlon Clark (1923–2007), American musician
- Mahlon Day (1790–1854), American children's book publisher
- Mahlon Marsh Day (1913–1992), American mathematician
- Mahlon DeLong, American neurologist and professor
- Mahlon E. Doyle (1924–2017), American cryptologist, inventor, and author
- Mahlon Dickerson Eyre (1821–1882), American banker
- Mahlon Norris Gilbert (1848–1900), American Episcopal bishop in Minnesota
- Mahlon Hamilton (1880–1960), American stage and screen actor
- Mahlon Hellerich (1919–2010), American historian
- Mahlon Hoagland (1921–2009), American biochemist
- Mahlon Kline (1846–1909), American pharmacist
- Mahlon Loomis (1826–1886), American dentist and inventor
- Mahlon Mitchell (born 1977), American firefighter
- Mahlon Perkins (1882–1963), American diplomat
- Mahlon Stacy (1638–1704), English settler to New Jersey

== Middle name ==
Listed alphabetically by surname

- J. Mahlon Barnes (1866–1934), American trade union functionary and socialist political activist
- Leonidas Mahlon Godley (1836–1904), American military officer
- Henry Mahlon Kimball (1878–1935), American politician in Michigan
- John Mahlon Marlin (1836–1901), American firearms manufacturer and inventor
- Roy Mahlon Shelbourne (1890–1974), American judge in Kentucky

== Other uses ==
- Mahlon Sweet Field, an American public airport in Oregon, also known as Eugene Airport
- Mahlon Williamson (barque), an American bark launched in 1854
- USS Mahlon S. Tisdale, an American guided-missile frigate launched in 1981

== See also ==
- Mahon (disambiguation)
