= Book of Ruth =

Book of the Bible

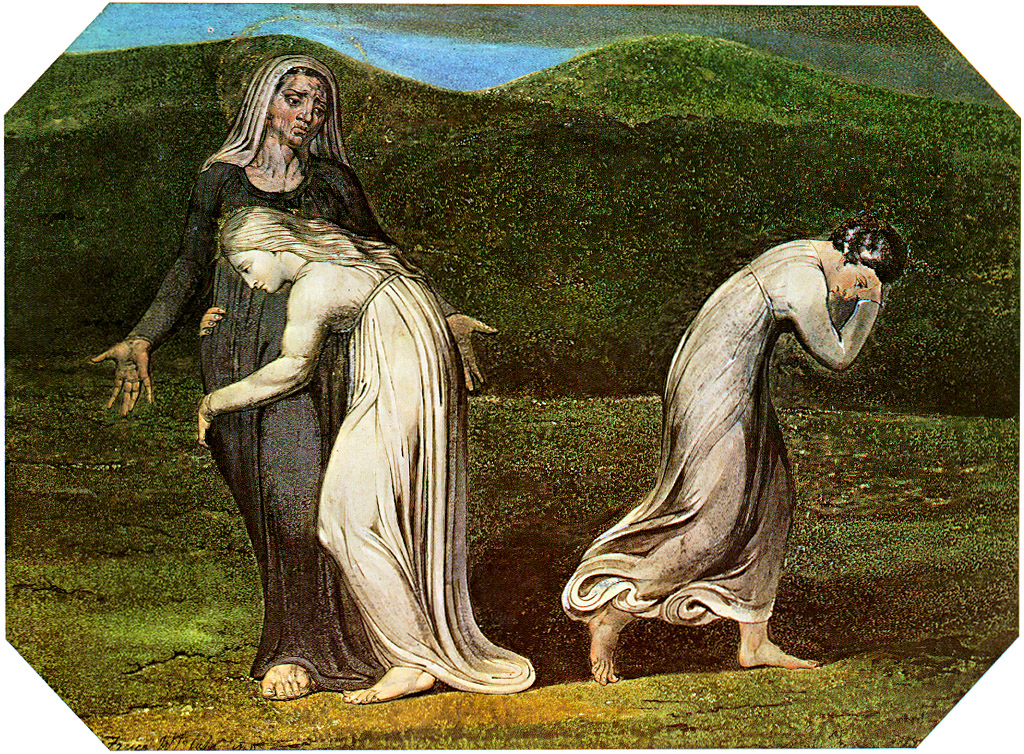
Naomi entreating Ruth and Orpah to return to the land of Moab by William Blake, 1795

The Book of Ruth (Hebrew: מְגִלַּת רוּת, romanized: Mĕgillat Rût, lit. 'Scroll of Ruth'; one of the Five Megillot) is part of the third and final division—the "Writings" (Ketuvim)—of the Hebrew Bible (Tanakh). In common printed Hebrew Bible ordering, the book appears between Song of Songs and the book of Lamentations.

The book was likely written in Biblical Hebrew during the Persian period (c. 550–330 BCE). It narrates the story of Ruth, a Moabite, who follows her Judean mother-in-law, Naomi, returning to her family's ancestral town of Bethlehem, after the deaths of their husbands. Ruth's loyalty to Naomi leads to Ruth's marriage to Boaz, the family's Judahite kinsman. The two produce a son, Obed, who becomes the grandfather of Israel's King David.

In Judaism, Ruth is regarded as a paradigmatic ger (i.e., a convert to Judaism), giving both Ruth and the book particular significance for Jewish converts; rabbinic sources derive several laws of Jewish conversion from Ruth's declaration. The book is traditionally chanted during Jewish prayer services in synagogues during the pilgrimage festival of Shavuot (lit. 'Weeks').

== Structure ==
The book is structured into four chapters.

Act 1: Prologue and Problem: Death and Emptiness Ruth 1:1–1:22

- Scene 1: Setting the scene (1:1–5)
- Scene 2: Naomi returns home (1:6–18)
- Scene 3: Arrival of Naomi and Ruth in Bethlehem (1:19–22)

Act 2: Ruth Meets Boaz, Naomi's Relative, in the Harvest Field Ruth 2:1–2:23

- Scene 1: Ruth in the field of Boaz (2:1–17)
- Scene 2: Ruth reports to Naomi (2:18–23)

Act 3: Naomi Sends Ruth to Boaz on the Threshing Floor Ruth 3:1–3:18

- Scene 1: Naomi Reveals Her Plan (3:1–5)
- Scene 2: Ruth at the threshing-floor of Boaz (3:6–15)
- Scene 3: Ruth reports to Naomi (3:16–18)

Act 4: Resolution and Epilogue: Life and Fullness Ruth 4:1–4:22

- Scene 1: Boaz with the men at the gate (4:1–12)
- Scene 2: A son is born to Ruth (4:13–17)

Genealogical appendix (4:18–22)

== Summary ==
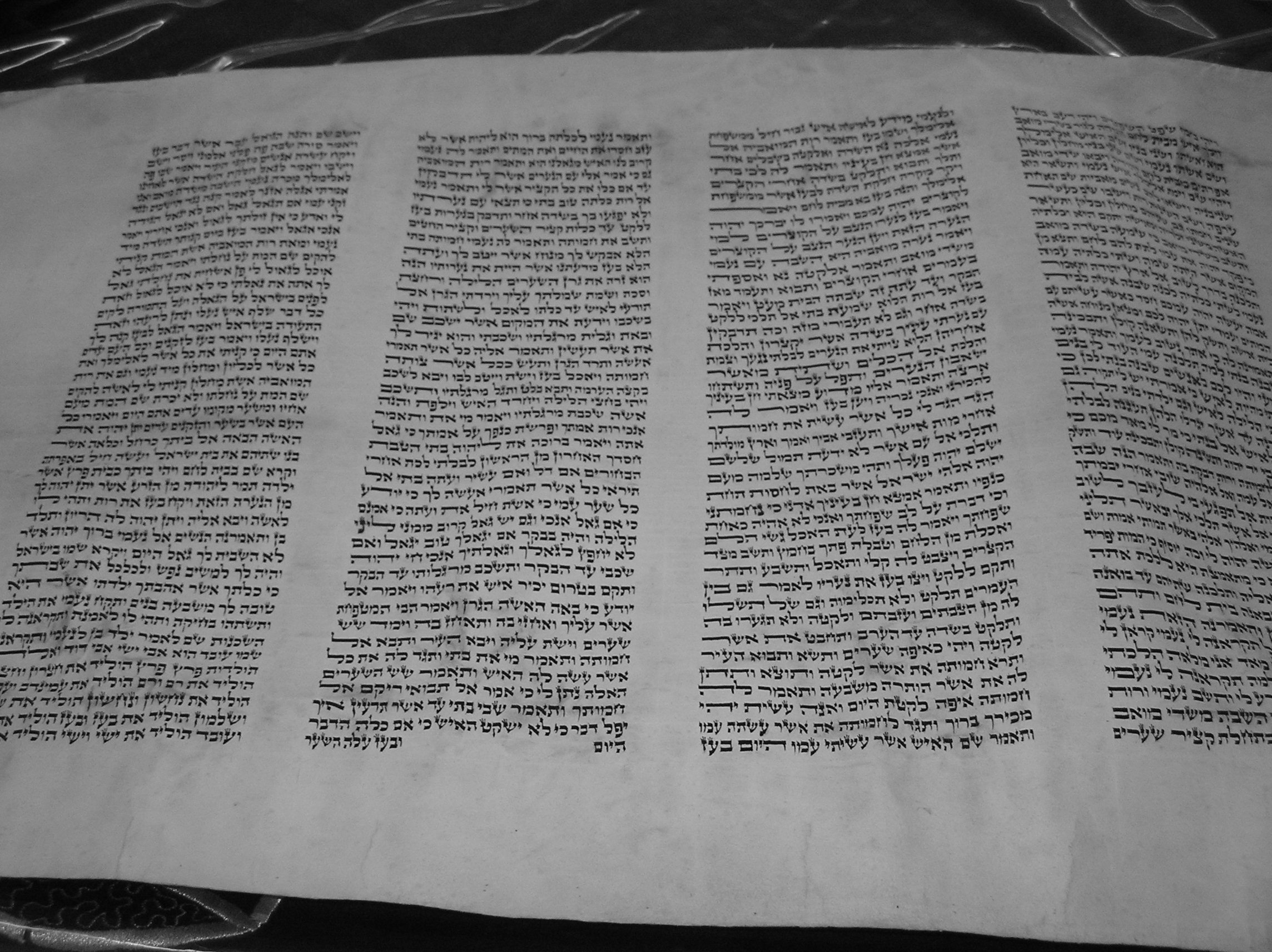
Hebrew text of Ruth

During the time of the biblical judges, an Israelite family from Bethlehem (who are Ephrathites)—Elimelech, his wife Naomi, and their sons Mahlon and Chilion—emigrate to the nearby country of Moab. Elimelech dies, and the sons marry two Moabite women: Mahlon weds Ruth and Chilion Orpah.

After about ten years, Naomi's two sons also die in Moab (1:4). Naomi decides to return to Bethlehem. She tells her daughters-in-law to return to their own mothers and remarry. Orpah reluctantly leaves. However, Ruth demurs: "Do not urge me to leave you, to turn back and not follow you. For wherever you go, I will go; wherever you lodge, I will lodge; your people shall be my people, and your God my God. Where you die, I will die, and there I will be buried. Thus and more may the Lord do to me if anything but death parts me from you." (Ruth 1:16–17 NJPS).

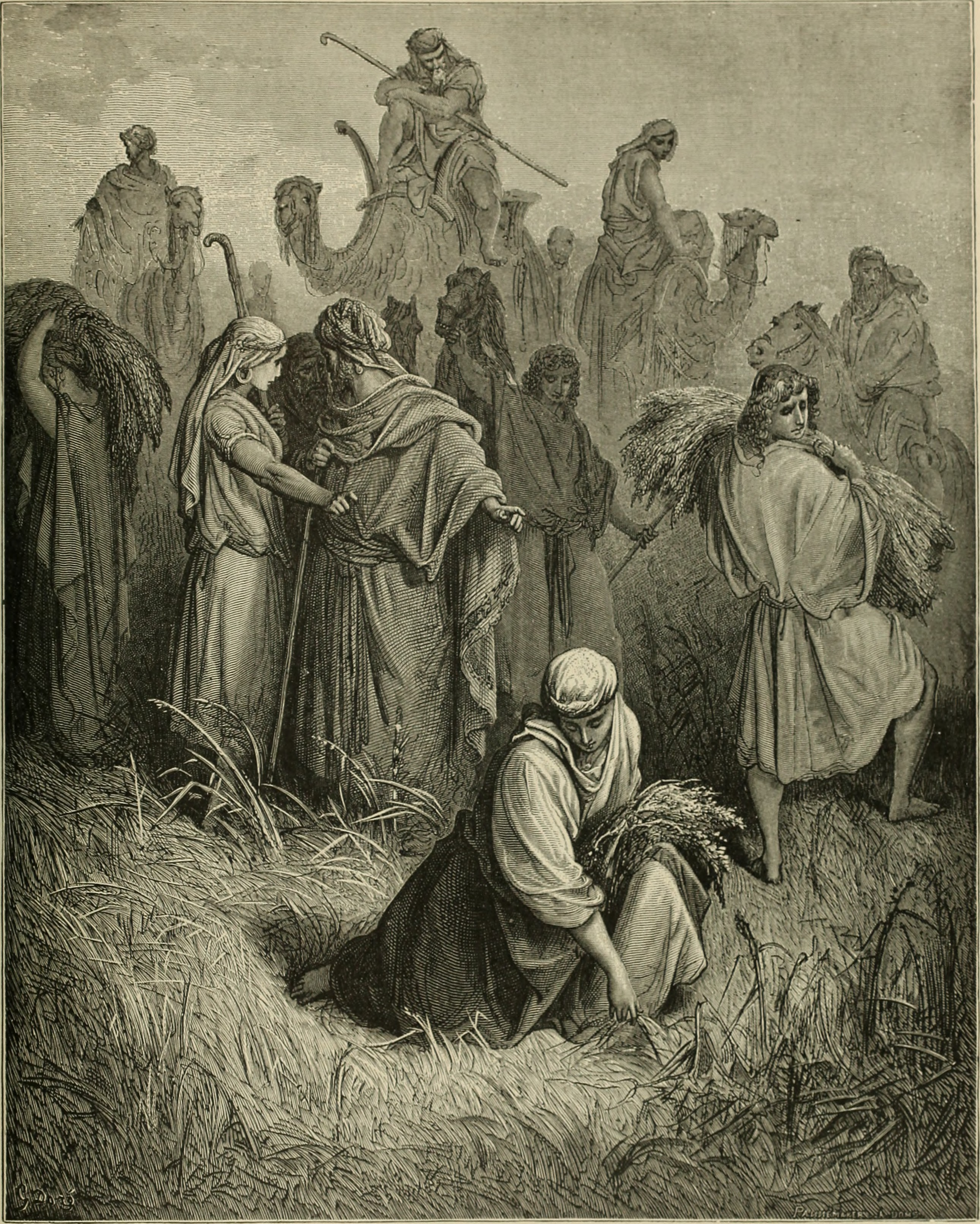
"The Gleaners", an engraving illustrating the Book of Ruth by Gustave Doré (1832–1883)

Naomi and Ruth return to Bethlehem at the beginning of the barley harvest and, in order to support her mother-in-law and herself, Ruth goes to the fields to glean. As it happens, the field belongs to a man named Boaz, who is kind to her because he has heard of her loyalty to her mother-in-law. Ruth tells Naomi of Boaz's kindness, and Ruth continues to glean in his field through the remainder of the barley and wheat harvests.

Boaz, being a close relative of Naomi's husband's family, is therefore obliged by the levirate law to marry Ruth, Mahlon's widow, to carry on his family's inheritance. Naomi sends Ruth to the threshing floor at night where Boaz sleeps, directing Ruth to "uncover his feet and lie down" and "await his instructions" (3:4). Ruth complies. On awakening, Boaz asks her who she is, and she replies: "I am your handmaid Ruth. Spread your robe over your handmaid, for you are a redeeming kinsman" (3:9 NJPS).

Acknowledging he is a close relative, Boaz blesses her and agrees to do all that is required. He notes that "all the elders of my town know what a fine woman you are" (3:11 NJPS). However, Boaz advises her that she has a male relative closer than he. Ruth remains in submission at his feet until she returns to the city in the morning.

Early that morning, Boaz goes to the city gate to meet with the other male relative before the town elders. The relative is not named. Boaz addresses him as ploni almoni "so and so". The relative, unwilling to jeopardize the inheritance of his own estate by marrying Ruth, relinquishes his right of redemption, thus freeing Boaz to marry Ruth. They transfer the property, redeeming it, and ratify the redemption by the nearer kinsman taking off his shoe and handing it over to Boaz. 4:7 notes for later generations that:

Now this was formerly done in Israel in cases of redemption or exchange: to validate any transaction, one man would take off his sandal and hand it to the other. Such was the practice in Israel (NJPS).

Boaz and Ruth are then married and have a son. The city's women celebrate Naomi's joy in finding a redeemer to preserve her family name. Naomi takes the child and places it on her bosom.

The child is named Obed, whom the reader discovers is "the father of Jesse, the father of David" (4:13–17); that is, he is the grandfather of King David, and so Ruth is the great-grandmother of King David.

The book concludes with an appendix tracing the Davidic genealogy all the way back from Perez, "whom Tamar bore to Judah", through to Obed, down to David.

== Composition and genre ==
According to some scholars, the Book of Ruth is possibly a work of historical fiction while other scholars hold that the Book is a historical narrative written in the form of a short story.

The book does not name its author. It is traditionally ascribed to the prophet Samuel (11th century BCE), but Ruth's identity as a non-Israelite and the stress on the need for an inclusive attitude towards foreigners suggests an origin in the fifth century BCE, when intermarriage had become controversial (as seen in Ezra 9:1 and Nehemiah 13:1).

A substantial number of scholars therefore date it to the Persian period (550–330 BCE). The genealogy that concludes the book is believed to be a post-exilic Priestly addition, as it adds nothing to the plot; nevertheless, it is carefully crafted and integrates the book into the history of Israel running from Genesis to Kings.

== Oldest surviving manuscripts ==
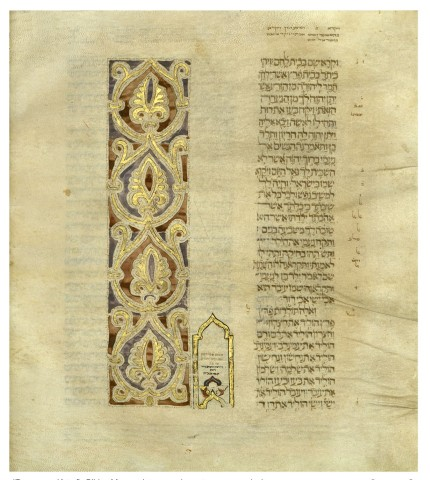
End of the book of Ruth in the Damascus Crown, a 1260 manuscript written in Burgos, Spain.

Surviving manuscripts date from hundreds or thousands of years after initial authorship. The oldest Hebrew manuscripts include the Aleppo Codex (10th century) and Codex Leningradensis (1008). Some fragments containing parts of this book were found among the Dead Sea Scrolls, i.e., 4Q104 (~50 BCE), 4Q105 (30 BCE – 68 CE), 2Q16 (~50 CE), and 2Q17 (~50 BCE), with only slight variations from the Masoretic Text.

A large letter נ, a majuscula, occurs in the first word of Ruth 3:13 - לִינִי (lî-nî; "tarry, stay, lodge, pass the night") - which the smaller Masora ascribes to the Oriental or Babylonian textualists.

There is also a translation into Koine Greek known as the Septuagint, made in the last few centuries BCE. Extant ancient manuscripts of the Septuagint version include Codex Vaticanus (4th century), Codex Alexandrinus (5th century). The whole book of Ruth is missing from the extant Codex Sinaiticus.

== Themes and background ==
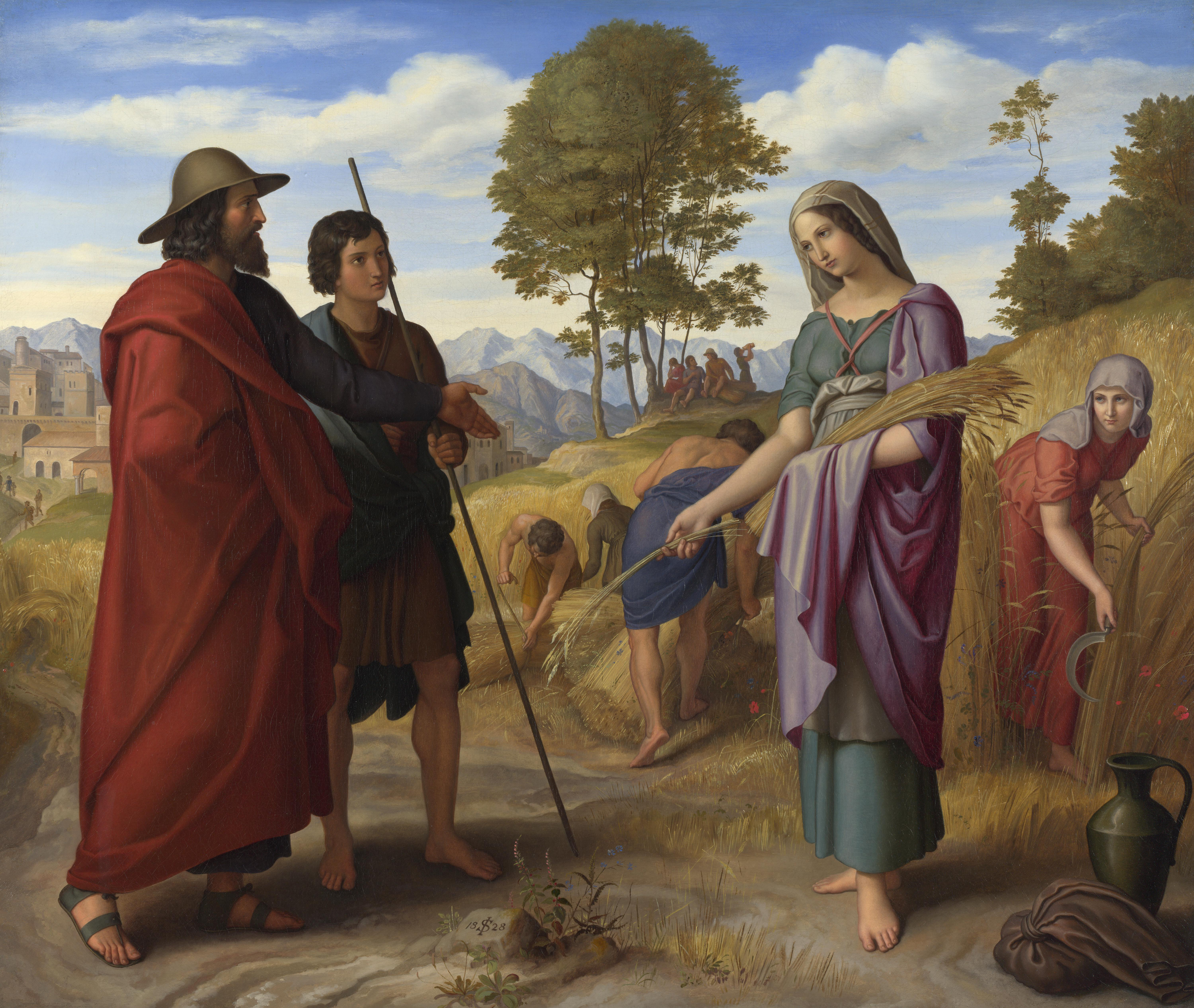
Julius Schnorr von Carolsfeld: Ruth in Boaz's Field, 1828

=== Levirate marriage and the "redeemers" ===
The Book of Ruth illustrates the difficulty of trying to use laws given in books such as Deuteronomy as evidence of actual practice. Naomi plans to provide security for herself and Ruth by arranging a Levirate marriage with Boaz. She instructs Ruth to uncover Boaz's feet and lie down after he has gone to sleep. When Boaz wakes up, surprised to see a woman at his feet, Ruth explains that she wants him to redeem (marry) her. The usual interpretation is to see sexual allusions in this part of the story, with 'feet' as a euphemism for genitals. (Note: For "feet" as a euphemism for genitals see, for example, Amy-Jill Levine, "Ruth," in Newsom and Ringe (eds.), The Women's Bible Commentary, pp. 78-84. The usual interpretation, as given here, is that Ruth is told to uncover Boaz's genitals, but see Kirsten Nielsen, "Other Writings," in McKenzie and Graham (eds.), The Hebrew Bible Today, pp. 175-176, where it is argued that Ruth is to uncover herself.)

Since there is no heir to inherit Elimelech's land, custom required a close relative (usually the dead man's brother) to marry the widow of the deceased in order to continue his family line (Deuteronomy 25:5–10). This relative was called the goel, the "kinsman-redeemer". As Boaz was not Elimelech's brother, nor Ruth his widow, scholars refer to the arrangement here as "Levirate-like". A complication arises in the story when it is revealed that another man is a closer relative to Elimelech than Boaz and therefore has first claim on Ruth.

This conflict is resolved through the custom that required land to stay in the family: a family could mortgage land to ward off poverty, but the law required a male relative to purchase it back into the family (Leviticus 25:25). When Boaz meets the near kinsman at the city gate, the place where contracts were settled, the kinsman initially agrees to purchase Elimelech's (now Naomi's) land, but upon hearing he must also take Ruth as his wife, he withdraws his offer. Boaz thus becomes "kinsman-redeemer" to Naomi and Ruth.

=== Mixed marriage ===
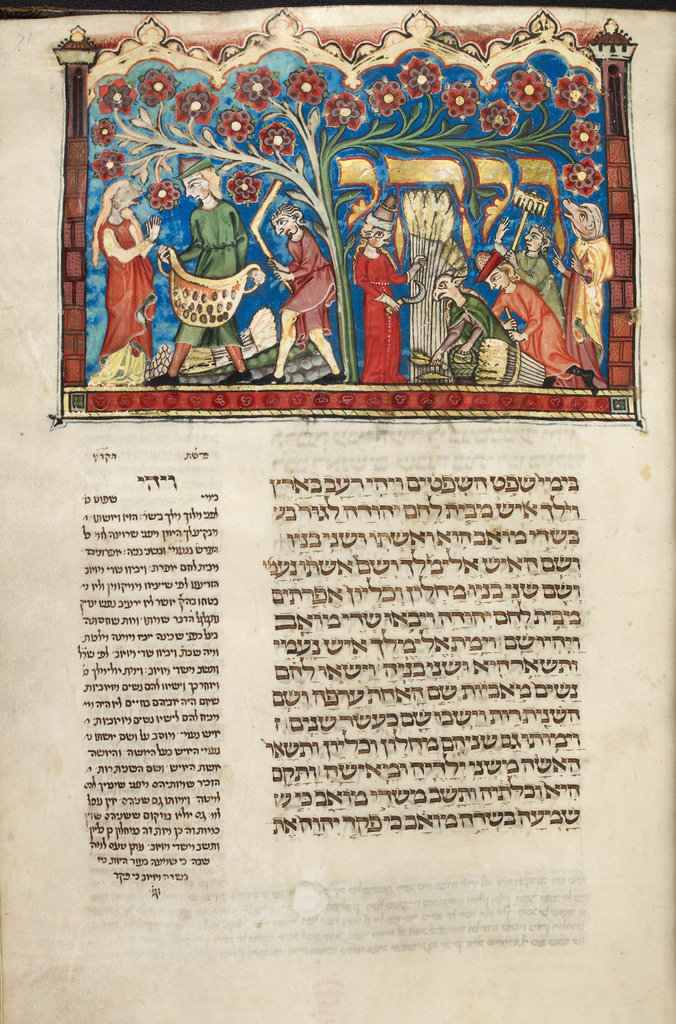
Harvest scene from the Book of Ruth, mahzor from South Germany, ca. 1320, British Library

The book can be read as a political parable relating to issues around the time of Ezra and Nehemiah (the 5th century BCE): unlike the story of Ezra–Nehemiah, wherein marriages between Jewish men and non-Jewish women were broken up, Ruth teaches that foreigners who convert to Judaism can become good Jews, foreign wives can become exemplary followers of Jewish law, and there is no reason to exclude them or their offspring from the community. Some believe the names of the participants suggest a fictional nature of the story: the husband and father was Elimelech, meaning "My God is King", and his wife was Naomi, "Pleasing", but after the deaths of her sons Mahlon, "Sickness", and Chilion, "Wasting", she asked to be called Mara, "Bitter".

The reference to Moab raises questions, since in the rest of the biblical literature it is associated with hostility to Israel, sexual perversity, and idolatry, and Deuteronomy 23:3–6 excluded an Ammonite or a Moabite from "the congregation of the LORD; even to their tenth generation". Despite this, Ruth the Moabite married a Judahite and even after his death still regarded herself a member of his family; she then married another Judahite and bore him a son who became an ancestor of David. Concerning this, the Mishnah says that only male Moabites are banned from the congregation.

=== Contemporary interpretations ===
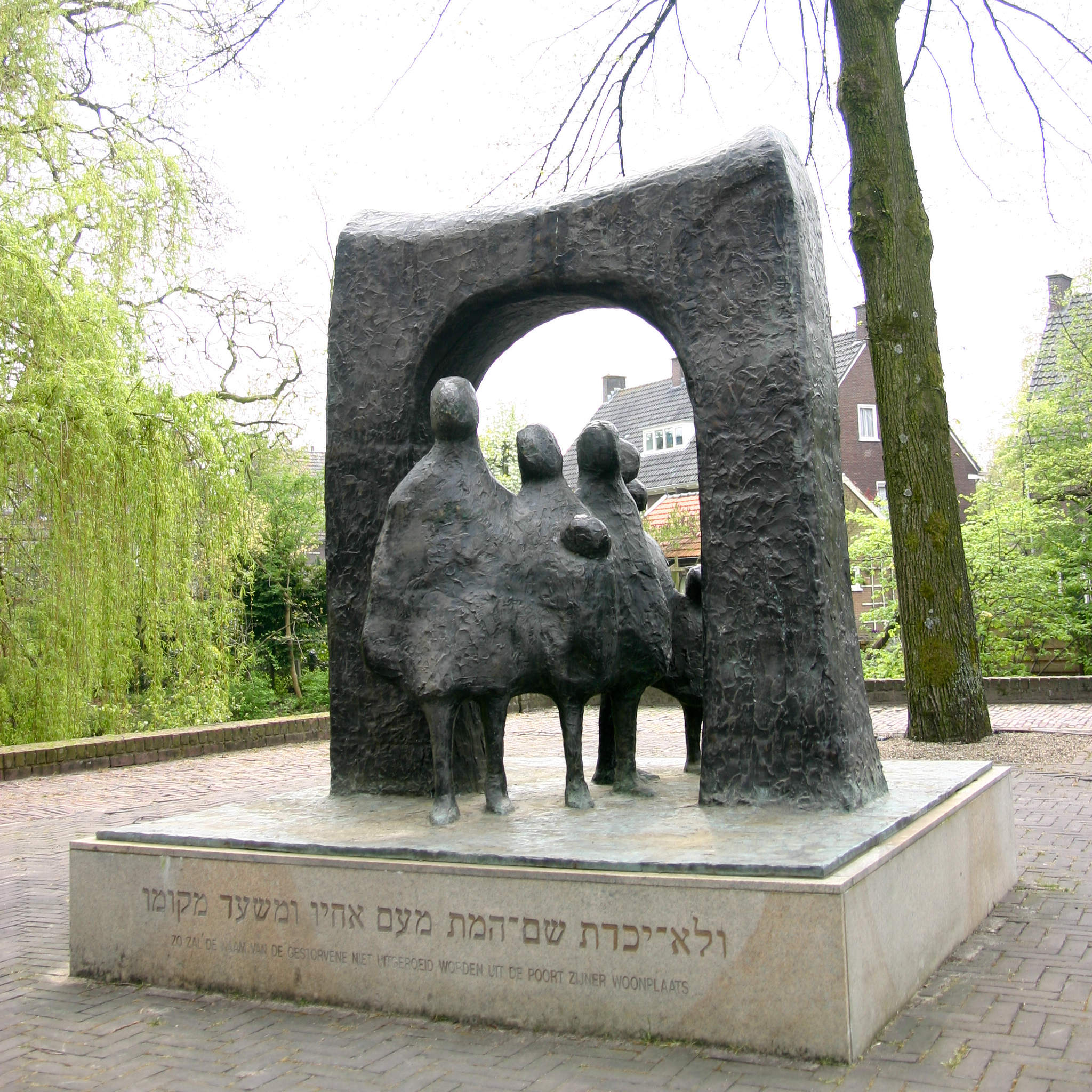
"Levenspoort" (Arch of Life), with a quote from Ruth 4:10 at its base; a bronze memorial sculpture by Yetty Elzas. In remembrance of the 71 Jewish citizens of Wageningen and surroundings, deported and murdered during the years 1940–1945

Scholars have increasingly explored Ruth in ways that allow it to address contemporary issues. Feminists, for example, have recast the story as one of the dignity of labour and female self-sufficiency, and as a model for lesbian relations, while others have seen in it a celebration of the relationship between strong and resourceful women. Others have seen it as a book that champions outcast and oppressed peoples.

== Genealogy: the ancestry of David from Ruth ==
Various relationships mentioned in the book form a family tree:

"

Elimelech	Naomi
Boaz	Ruth	Mahlon	Chilion	Orpah
Obed
Jesse
David

Verses 4:18–22 contains a genealogy Perez (son of Judah) to David with names.

Perez
Hezron
Ram
Amminadab
Nahshon
Salmon
Boaz
Obed
Jesse
David

== Christian canon and reception ==
In most Christian canons, the Book of Ruth is treated as one of the historical books and placed between Judges and 1 Samuel. In the Gospel of Matthew, Ruth and Boaz are named among the ancestors of Jesus of Nazareth.

== See also ==
- Goel (Judaism)
- Levirate marriage
- Genealogy of Jesus

== Bibliography ==
- Allen, Leslie C. (1996). "Ruth". In LaSor, William Sanford; Hubbard, David Allan; Bush, Frederic William; et al. (eds.). Old Testament Survey: The Message, Form, and Background of the Old Testament. Eerdmans. ISBN 9780802837882.
- Atteridge, Harold W. (2006). The HarperCollins Study Bible. HarperCollins.
- Bartal, Ruth (2023). 'The Book of Ruth and Blanche of Castile. Leiden: Alexandros Press. ISBN 9789490387129.
- Coogan, Michael D. (2008). A Brief Introduction to the Old Testament: The Hebrew Bible in Its Context. Oxford University Press. ISBN 9780195332728. Archived from the original on July 1, 2023.
- Coogan, Michael D. (October 1, 2010). God and Sex: What the Bible Really Says. Grand Central Publishing. p. 13. ISBN 978-0-446-57413-6.
- Emmerson, Grace I. (2007). "11. Ruth". In Barton, John; Muddiman, John (eds.). The Oxford Bible Commentary (first (paperback) ed.). Oxford University Press. pp. 192–195. ISBN 978-0199277186.
- Grabbe, Lester L. (2004). The History of the Jews and Judaism in the Second Temple Period, Volume 1: Yehud, the Persian Province of Judah. Continuum. pp. 105 & 312. ISBN 9780567089984.
- Hubbard, Robert L. Jr. (1988). The Book of Ruth. Eerdmans. ISBN 9780802825261.
- Gigot, Francis (1912). "Book of Ruth" . In Herbermann, Charles (ed.). Catholic Encyclopedia. Vol. 13. New York: Robert Appleton Company.
- Irwin, B.P. (2008). "Ruth 4: Person". In Longman, Tremper; Enns, Peter (eds.). Dictionary of the Old Testament: Wisdom, Poetry & Writings. InterVarsity Press. ISBN 9780830817832.
- Leith, Mary Joan Winn (2007). "Ruth". In Coogan, Michael D.; Brettler, Marc Zvi; Newsom, Carol Ann; et al. (eds.). The New Oxford Annotated Bible with the Apocryphal/Deuterocanonical Books: New Revised Standard Version. Oxford University Press. ISBN 9780195288803.
- Mihăilă, Alexandru (2011). The Conversion of the Foreigners between Ruth and Ezra-Nehemiah. Institutul Teologic Penticostal.
- Ulrich, Eugene, ed. (2010). The Biblical Qumran Scrolls: Transcriptions and Textual Variants. Brill. ISBN 9789004181830.
- West, Gerald (2003). "Ruth". In Dunn, James D.G.; Rogerson, John William (eds.). Eerdmans Commentary on the Bible. Eerdmans. ISBN 9780802837110.
- Wright Knust, Jennifer (January 25, 2011). Unprotected Texts: The Bible's Surprising Contradictions About Sex and Desire. HarperOne. p. 32. ISBN 978-0-06-201082-7. Archived from the original on November 11, 2023.
- Würthwein, Ernst (1995). The Text of the Old Testament. Translated by Rhodes, Erroll F. Grand Rapids, MI: Wm. B. Eerdmans. ISBN 0-8028-0788-7.

Book of Ruth History books
Preceded by Song of Songs	Hebrew Bible	Succeeded by Lamentations
Preceded by Judges	Christian; Old Testament	Succeeded by 1–2 Samuel
