= Orpah =

Biblical figure from the Book of Ruth

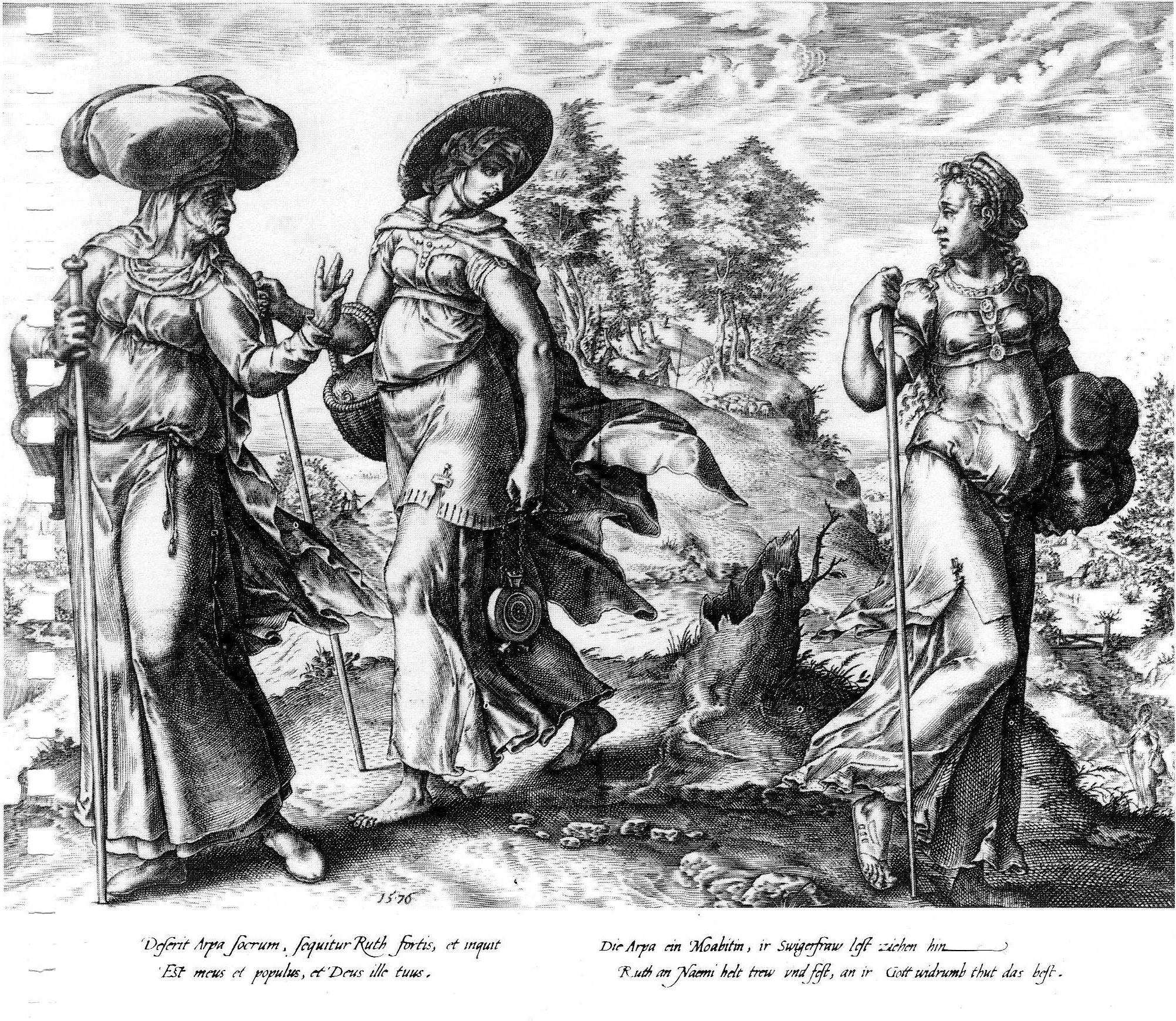
Orpah (right) leaving Ruth and Naomi. Engraving by Hendrik Goltzius, 1576.

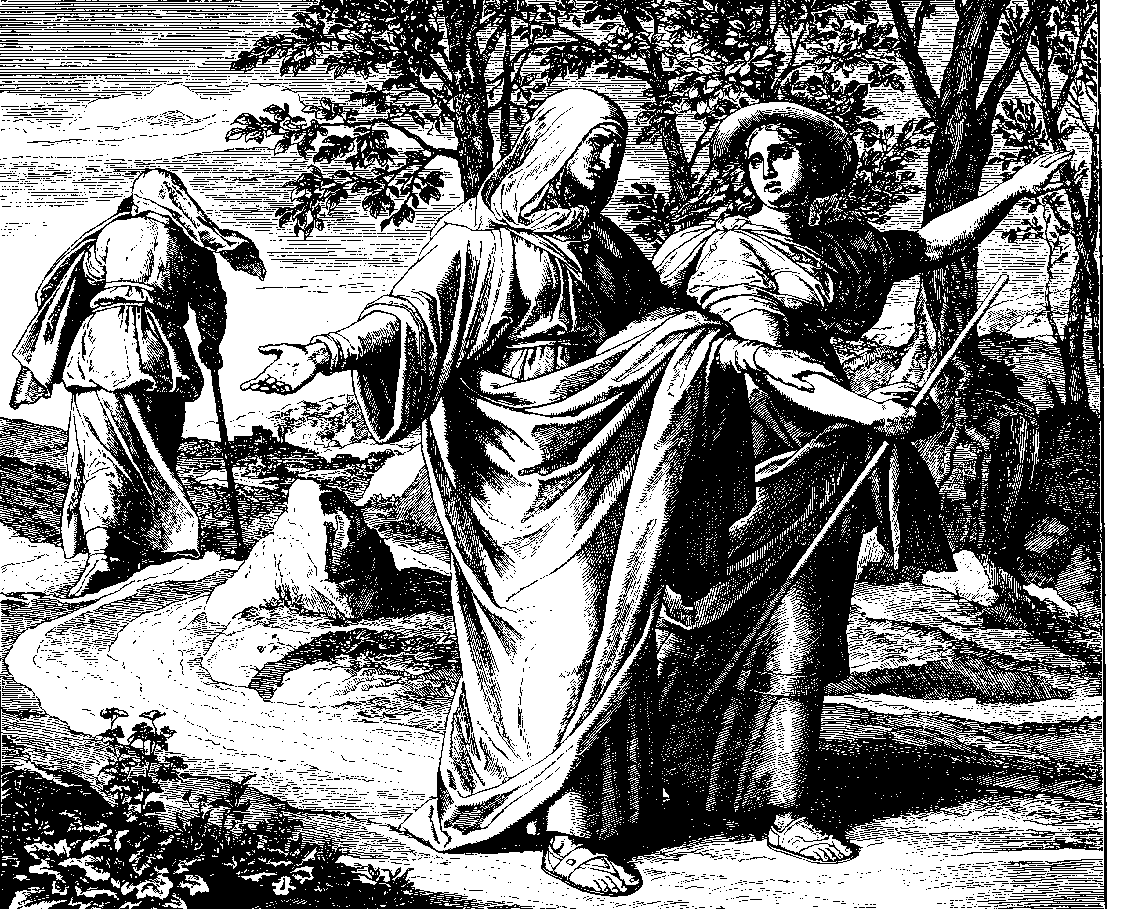
Woodcut by Julius Schnorr von Karolsfeld

Orpah (Hebrew: עָרְפָּה ʿOrpā, meaning "neck" or "fawn") is a woman mentioned in the Book of Ruth in the Hebrew Bible. She was from Moab and was the daughter-in-law of Naomi and wife of Chilion. After the death of her husband, Orpah and her sister-in-law Ruth wished to go to Judea with Naomi. However, Naomi tried to persuade both Ruth and Orpah to return to their people and to their gods. Ruth chose to remain with Naomi, but Orpah chose to return to her people and her gods. (Ruth i. 4 et seq.).

== In rabbinicism ==
In rabbinic literature, the treatment of Orpah is almost entirely negative. Babylonian Talmud (Sotah 42b) identifies Orpah with Harapha, the mother of the four Philistine giants (2 Samuel 21:16), one of whom was Goliath. These four sons were said to have been given to her for the four tears which she shed at parting with her mother-in-law.

Tractate Sanhedrin in the Talmud says that David's general, Abishai, the son of David's sister Zeruiah, killed her with her own spindle.

== Namesakes ==
Orpah was the name originally given to Oprah Winfrey by her mother.
