= Boaz =

Biblical figure, husband of Ruth, ancestor of David

Boaz 𐤁𐤏𐤆 (Phoenician) בֹּעַז (Hebrew)
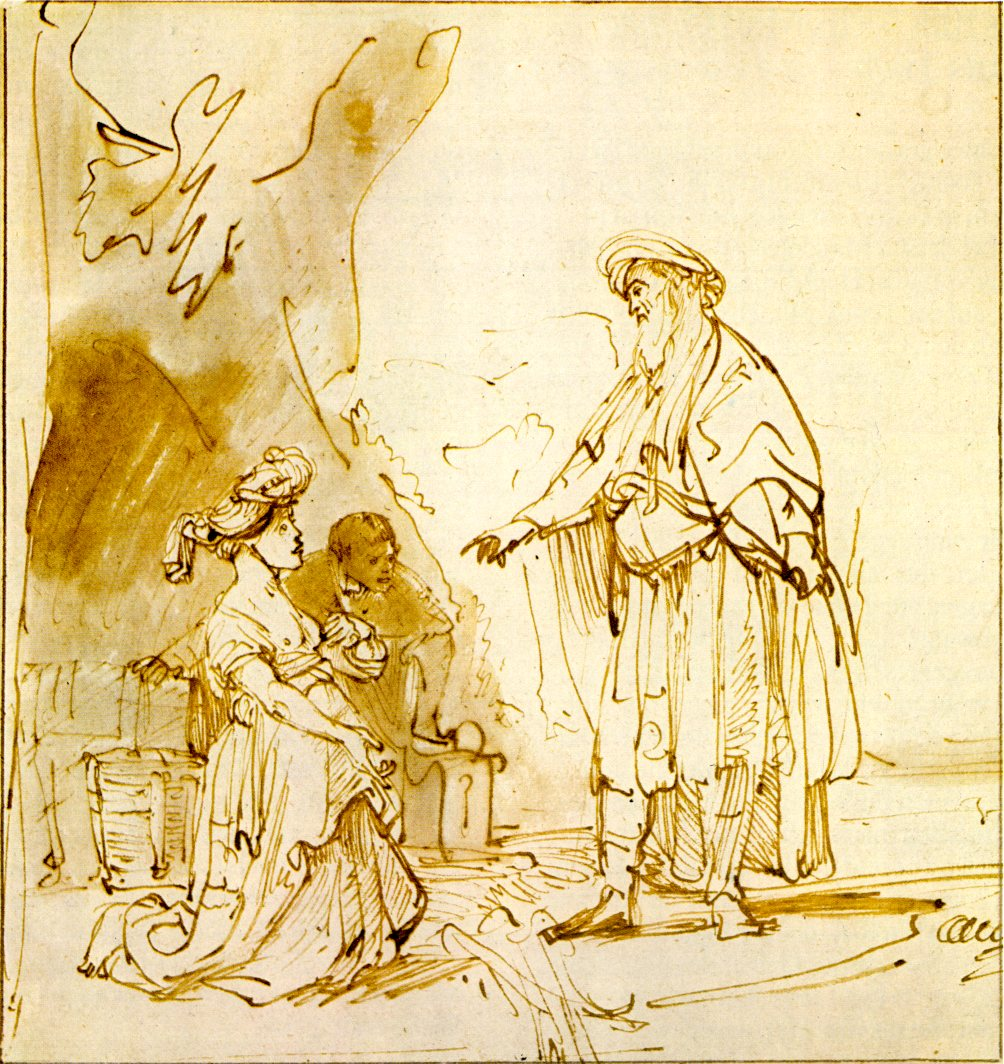
- Boaz and Ruth by Rembrandt
- Spouse: Ruth
- Children: Obed
- Father: Salmon
- Relatives: Jesse (grandson); David (great-grandson)

Son of Biblical Salmon, father of Biblical Obed.

Boaz (/ˈboʊæz/; Hebrew: בֹּעַז, Bōʿaz) is a biblical figure appearing in the Book of Ruth in the Hebrew Bible and in the genealogies of Jesus in the New Testament and also the name of a pillar in the portico of the historic Temple in Jerusalem. The word is found 24 times in the Scriptures, two being in Greek (in the form "Βοόζ (Booz)").

The root בעז, just used in the Bible in relation to "Boaz" (see The Temple), perhaps expresses 'quick(ness)'. The etymology of the name has been suggested by many as be'oz, "in the strength of", or bo'oz, "in him (is) strength" from the root 'zz, "to be strong", hence the use of the name "Boaz" for one of the pillars at the portico of the temple (1 Kings 7:21), although Biblical scholar Martin Noth preferred "of sharp mind".

== Bible narrative ==
=== Hebrew Bible ===
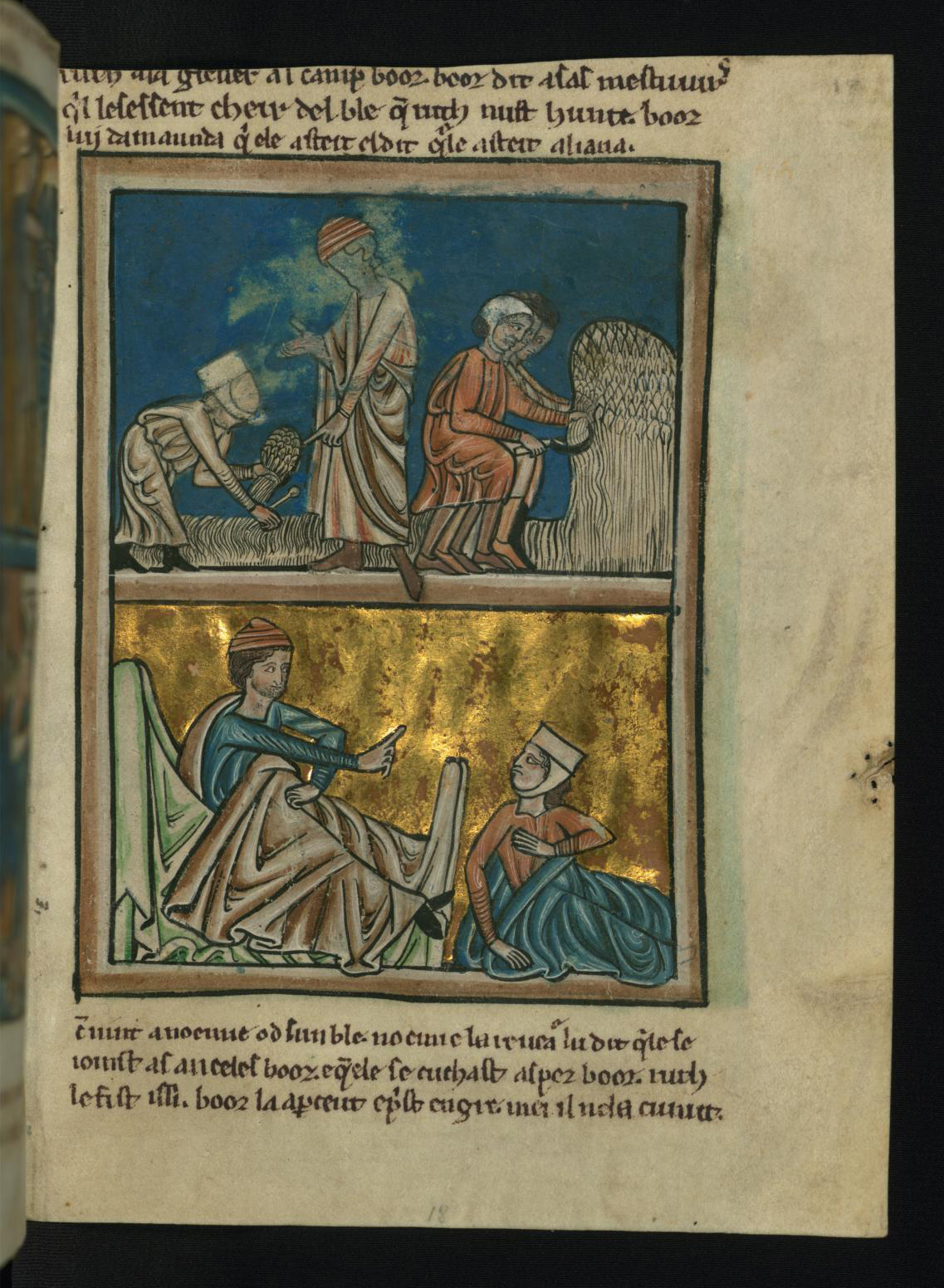
Top – Ruth Meets Boaz as she gleans

The son of Salmon, Boaz was a wealthy landowner of Bethlehem in Judea, and relative of Elimelech, Naomi's late husband. He notices Ruth, the widowed Moabite daughter-in-law of Naomi, a relative of his (see family tree), gleaning grain in his fields. He soon learns of the difficult circumstances her family is in and Ruth's loyalty to Naomi. In response, Boaz invites her to eat with him and his workers, as well as deliberately leaving grain for her to claim while keeping a protective eye on her.

In the Bible, he functions as the power center for the entire further development. For example, he brings about the acceptance of Ruth and the reacceptance of Naomi as well.

Ruth approaches Boaz and asks him to exercise his right of kinship and marry her. Boaz accepts, provided that another with a superior claim declines. Since the first son of Ruth and a kinsman of her late husband would be deemed the legal offspring of the decedent and heir to Elimelech, the other kinsman defers to Boaz.

In marrying Ruth, Boaz revives Elimelech's lineage, and the patrimony is secured to Naomi's family.

Their son was Obed, father of Jesse, and grandfather of David.

According to the ancient Jewish historian Flavius Josephus, he lived at the time of Eli.

=== The Temple ===
According to the First Book of Kings and the Second Book of Chronicles, "Boaz" was the name of the left one of the two frontal columns of Solomon's Temple, the other being "Jachin" (Hebrew: יכין). It has variously been supposed to be an acronym a word unto itself, or part of a two-word sentence with the other pillar. Its meaning has been given variously as: the name of an architect or donor (by Wilhelm Gesenius), "sons of Solomon" (by Heinrich Ewald), "in strength" (by Samuel Öttli) "he (God) establisheth in strength" (by Otto Thenius, along with the other pillar), or "Owner/Lord of the strength" (by August Klostermann, along with the other pillar).

=== New Testament ===
Boaz is mentioned in the Gospel of Matthew as the son of Salmon and Rahab (seemingly Rahab of Jericho) and as an ancestor of Jesus.

== Rabbinic Jewish tradition ==
=== Conduct ===
In the Talmud, some rabbis identify Boaz with the judge Ibzan of Bethlehem in the land of the Tribe of Judah. Today, many scholars believe that the Bethlehem that Ibzan was from is "Bethlehem in Zebulun" (as mentioned in Joshua 19:15), because the two Biblical judges before Ibzan, Jair and Jephthah, were from Gilead in the land of the Tribe of Zebulun. However, the view that Ibzan was from Gilead contradicts the writings of the ancient historian Josephus, who wrote: "Now when Jephtha was dead, Ibzan took the government; being of the tribe of Judah, and of the city of Bethlehem." A tradition in the Talmud relates that Ibzan lost all his sixty children during his lifetime because he did not invite Manoah, Samson's father, to any of the marriage festivities at his house. Since Manoah was at that time without children, Boaz thought he did not need to consider on such occasions a childless man who could not pay him back in kind (Bava Batra 91a).

The Talmud tells that Boaz was a just, pious, and learned judge. The custom of using the Divine Name in greeting one's fellow-man (Rt-2.4) formulated by him and his bet din ("court [of] law") received the approval of even the heavenly bet din (Babylonian Talmud Makkot 23b; Yerushalmi Talmud Ber. ix. 14c; Midrash Ruth Rabbah to ii. 4). The midrash Ruth Rabbah states that being a pious man, Boaz on his first meeting with Ruth perceived her conscientiousness in picking up the grain, as she strictly observed the rules prescribed by the Law. This, as well as her grace and her chaste conduct during work, induced Boaz to inquire about the stranger, although he was not in the habit of inquiring after women (Ruth Rabba to ii. 5; Talmudic tractate Shabbat 113b).

In the conversation that followed between Boaz and Ruth, the pious proselyte said that, being a Moabite, she was excluded from association with the community of God (Deuteronomy 23:3). Boaz, however, replied that the prohibition in the Scripture applied only to the men of Moab – and not to the women. He furthermore told her that he had heard from the prophets that she was destined to become the ancestress of kings and prophets; and he blessed her with the words: "May God, who rewards the pious, also reward you." (Targum Ruth ii. 10, 11; Pesiḳ, ed. Buber, xvi. 124a) Boaz was especially friendly toward the poor stranger during the meal, when he indicated to her by various symbolic courtesies that she would become the ancestress of the Davidic royal house, including the Messiah (Ruth R. to ii. 14; Shab. 113b). As toward Ruth, Boaz had also been kind toward his kinsmen, Naomi's sons, on hearing of their death, taking care that they had an honorable burial (Ruth Rabba to 2.20).

=== Boaz and Ruth ===
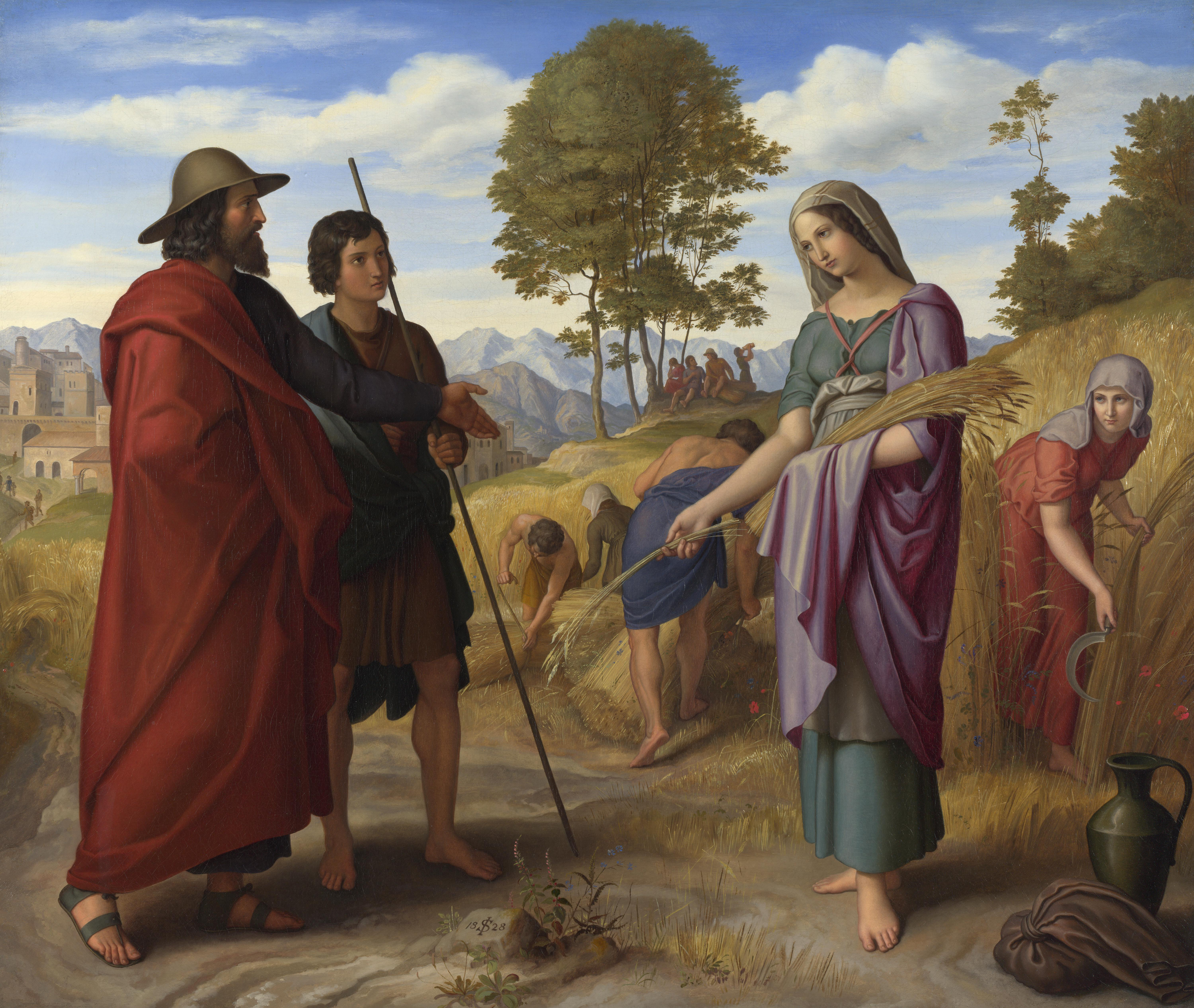
Ruth in Boaz's Field by Julius Schnorr von Carolsfeld, 1828

Although Boaz was the prince of the people, he personally supervised the threshing of the grain in his barn, in order to circumvent any immorality or theft, both of which were rife in his days (Tan., Behar, ed. Buber, viii.; Ruth Rabba to iii. 7). Glad in his heart that the famine was over in Israel, he sought rest after having thanked God and studied for a while in the Torah (Tan., l.c.; Targum Ruth iii. 7; and Ruth Rabba ib.). Aroused out of his first sleep by Ruth, he was greatly frightened, as he thought she was a devil; and he was convinced of the contrary only after touching the hair of her head, since devils were believed to be bald (Tan., l.c.). When he perceived Ruth's pure and holy intentions he not only did not reprove her for her unusual behavior, he blessed her and gave her six measures of barley, indicating thereby that six pious men should spring from her, who would be gifted by God with six excellences (cf. Isaiah 11:2; Sanhedrin 93b; Numbers Rabba xiii. 11; Ruth Rabba and Targum to Ruth iii. 15; the names of the six men differ in these passages, but David and the Messiah are always among them). Boaz fulfilled the promises he had given to Ruth, and when his kinsman (the sources differ as to the precise relationship existing between them) would not marry her because he did not know the halakah which decreed that Moabite women were not excluded from the Israelite community, Boaz himself wed her.

== See also ==
- Goel (Judaism)
- F. Brown, S. Driver, C. Briggs. The Brown–Driver–Briggs Hebrew and English lexicon. Tenth printing. Peabody, MA, USA: Hendrickson, October 2006. ISBN 978-156-563-206-6. (Each of the authors was dLitt and dd |p. iii|.)
- Barnes, W. Emery (1904). "Jachin and Boaz". Journal of Theological Studies. V (19): 447–451. doi:10.1093/jts/os-V.19.447.
