= Goel (Judaism) =

Concept in Judaism related to restoring the rights of another

Goel (Hebrew: גואל, romanized: goʾel, lit. 'redeemer'), in the Hebrew Bible and rabbinic Judaism, is a person who, as the nearest relative of someone, is charged with the duty of restoring that person's rights and avenging wrongs done to him or her. One duty of the goel was to redeem (purchase back) a relative who had been sold into slavery. Another was to avenge the death of a relative who had been wrongly killed; one carrying out this vengeance was known as the goel hadam, commonly translated to English as "avenger of blood."

The term goel is also used for other forms of redemption. In the Book of Isaiah, God is called the redeemer of Israel, as God redeems his people from captivity; the context shows that the redemption also involves moving on to something greater.

== Duties of the goel ==
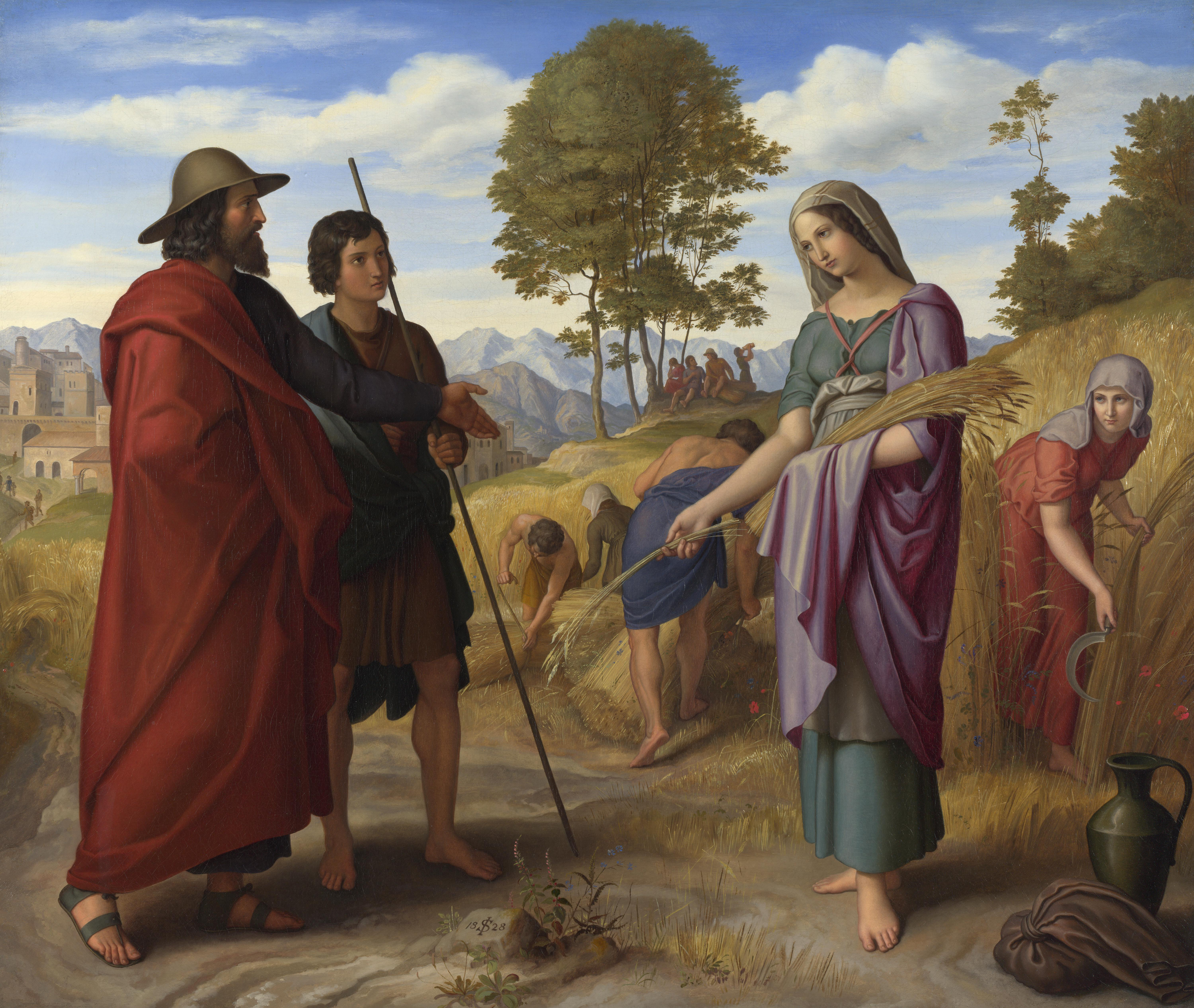
Julius Schnorr von Carolsfeld: Ruth in Boaz's Field, 1828. The Book of Ruth tells the story of Ruth and her mother-in-law Naomi. After her husband's death they both move to Naomi's native land, where she is redeemed from poverty and widowhood through Ruth by her goel, Boaz.

The obligations of the goel include the duty to redeem the relative from slavery if the latter had been obliged to sell himself into slavery (Leviticus 25:48–49); to repurchase the property of a relative who had had to sell it because of poverty; to avenge the blood of his relative; to marry his brother's widow to have a son for his brother, in the case that the brother had no son to pass on his name (Deuteronomy 25:5–6); and to receive the restitution if the injured relative had died (Numbers 5:8).

Numbers 35:9–30 regulates the duties of the goel hadam. The congregation must judge the case before it puts a murderer in the hands of a goel. More than one witness is needed for conviction. In case of accidental manslaughter, the slayer can save his life by fleeing to a city of refuge and staying there until the death of the High Priest of Israel. Ransom is not accepted for murder. Revenge cannot be taken on the offender's children or parents (Deuteronomy 24:16).

Leviticus 25:48–49 gives the order in which the nearest relative is considered the goel in the case of redeeming a slave: brother, uncle, male cousin and then other relatives. The same order was probably observed in the other cases, except in marrying a sister-in-law.

== The blood-avenger in rabbinic tradition ==
Jewish tradition has also attributed the blood avenger role in modern times to a prosecuting attorney, who pleads on behalf of the victim in the case against the criminal. Thus, he is responsible for bringing the offender to court, finding evidence against him, presenting the case, and collecting damages from the offender. His task is also to argue against any attempts to pardon the sinner. It is presumed that the court would be the party who would avenge the wrongful death via the imposition of the death penalty, though Deuteronomy 13:9 suggests that the witness to an offence and afterward the whole of the people would carry out the penalty of death by stoning.

== See also ==
- Next of kin
- Redeemer (Christianity)
