= Naomi (biblical figure) =

Ruth's mother-in-law in the Book of Ruth

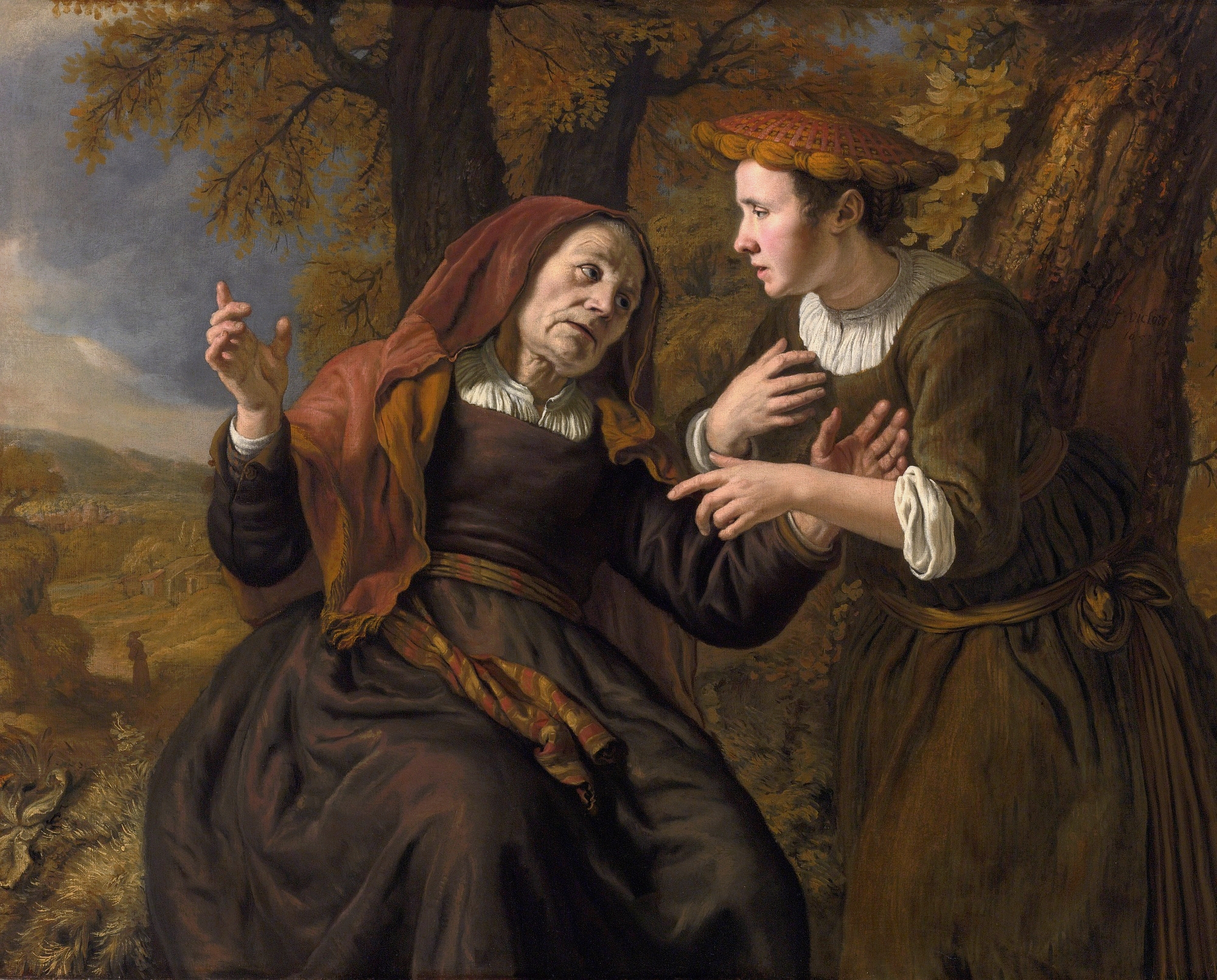
Ruth swearing to Naomi by Jan Victors, 1653

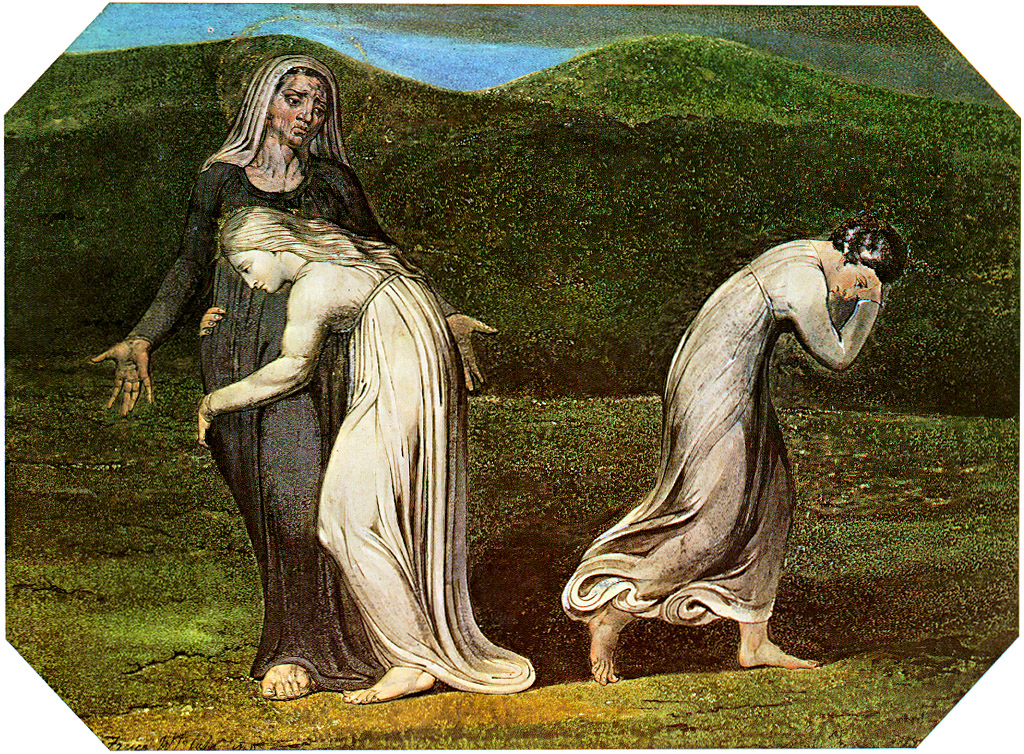
Naomi entreating Ruth and Orpah to return to the land of Moab, by William Blake

Naomi (Classically /ˈneɪ.oʊmaɪ, neɪˈoʊmaɪ/, colloquially /neɪˈoʊmi, ˈneɪ.oʊmi/; Hebrew: נָעֳמִי, Modern: Noʻomī, Tiberian: Nā‘ŏmī) is Ruth's mother-in-law in the Hebrew Bible in the Book of Ruth. The name derives from the Hebrew word na’im, meaning "good, pleasant, lovely, winsome."

== Biblical narrative ==
Naomi is married to a man named Elimelech. A famine causes them to move with their two sons from their home in Judea to Moab. While there Elimelech dies, as well as their sons, who had gotten married in the meantime. Near destitute, Naomi returns to Bethlehem with one daughter-in-law, Ruth, whom she could not dissuade from accompanying her. Her other daughter-in-law, Orpah, remains in Moab.

When Naomi returns, she tells the Bethlehemites, "Do not call me Naomi, call me Mara (מרא), for the Almighty has dealt very bitterly with me". Barry Webb points out that there is not only an objective element in her life being bitter through bereavement, dislocation, and poverty, but also a subjective element—the bitterness she feels. He further argues that in Chapter 1 of the Book of Ruth, Naomi's "perception of her condition" is "distorted by self-absorption," but that Ruth plays "a key role in her rehabilitation." Abraham Kuyper, on the other hand, asserts that "Naomi has such innate nobility of character that she immediately elicits from us our most sincere sympathy." The Book of Ruth depicts the struggles of Naomi and Ruth for survival in a patriarchal environment.

The arrival of Naomi and Ruth in Bethlehem coincides with the barley harvest. Naomi gives Ruth permission to glean those fields where she is allowed. Ruth is working in the field of Boaz, when a servant identifies her to him as Naomi's daughter-in-law. It happens that Boaz is a kinsman of Naomi's late husband. He tells her to work with the female servants, warns the young men not to bother her, and at mealtime invites her to share his food.

When Naomi learns that Ruth has the attention and kindness of Boaz, she counsels Ruth to approach him directly: "... [P]ut on your best attire and go down to the threshing floor. Do not make yourself known to the man before he has finished eating and drinking. But when he lies down, take note of the place where he does so. Then go, uncover a place at his feet, and lie down. He will tell you what to do." (Ruth 3:3–4)

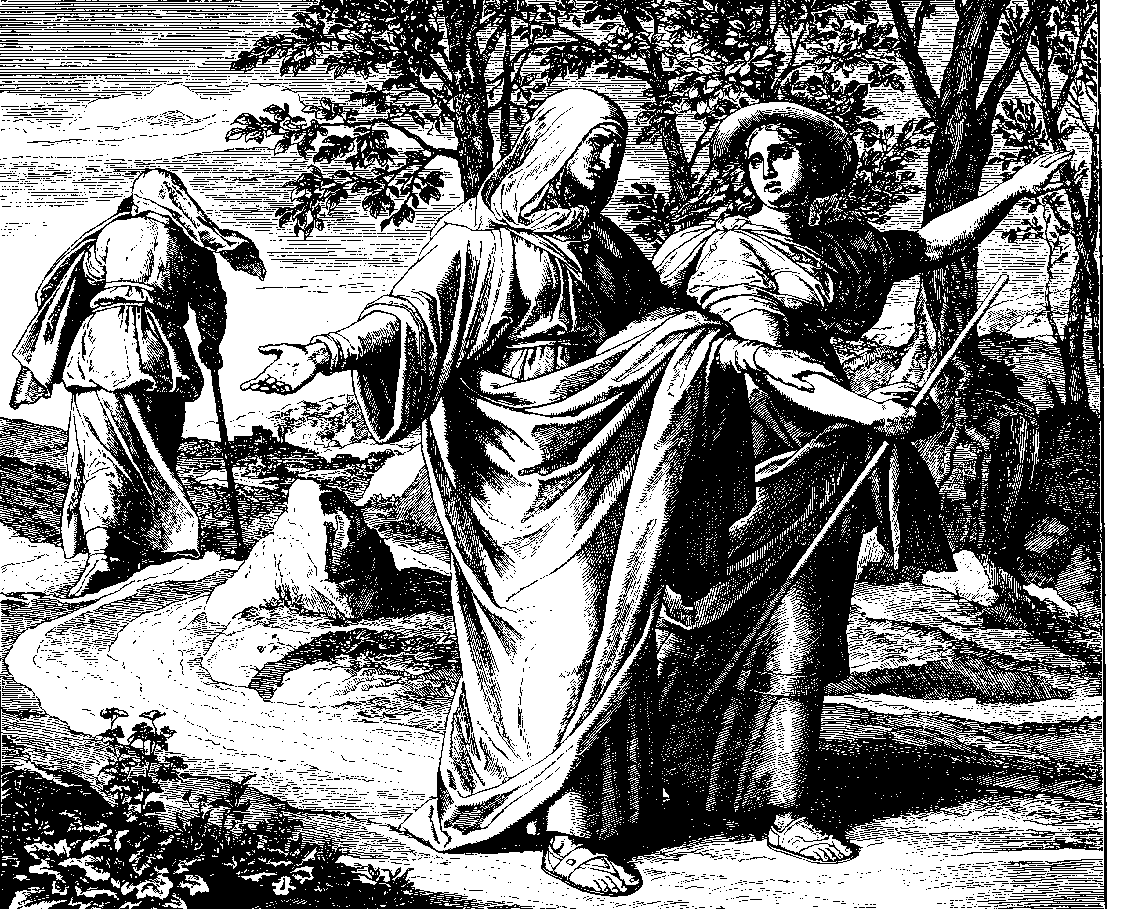
Naomi (center) walking with Ruth, woodcut by Julius Schnorr von Karolsfeld

Webb points out Naomi's "feminine scheming" in forcing Boaz's hand. Yitzhak Berger suggests that Naomi's plan was that Ruth seduce Boaz, just as Tamar and the daughters of Lot all seduced "an older family member in order to become the mother of his offspring." At the crucial moment, however, "Ruth abandons the attempt at seduction and instead requests a permanent, legal union with Boaz."

Ruth marries Boaz, and they have a son, for whom Naomi cares, and so the women of the town say: "Naomi has a son" (Ruth 4:17). In this way, the book can be seen to be Naomi's story: Gregory Goswell argues that Naomi is the central character of the book, whereas Ruth is the main character. The son in question was Obed, who was the father of Jesse and thus later the grandfather of David.
