= Obed (biblical figure) =

Son of Boaz and Ruth in the Hebrew Bible

Obed 𐤏𐤅𐤁𐤃 עוֹבֵד
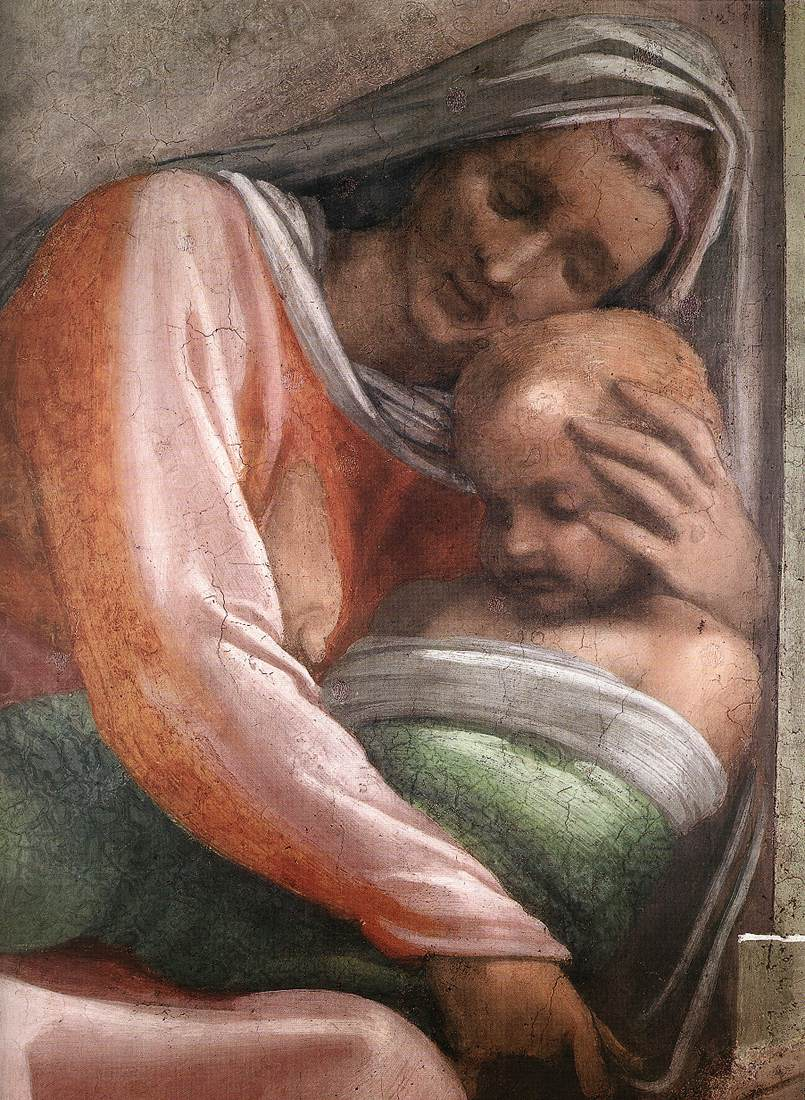
- Salmon, Boaz, and Obed by Michelangelo, 1511, depicts the infant Obed
- Born: c. 1203 BCE
- Died: C. 12th century BCE
- Children: Jesse
- Parents: Boaz (father); Ruth (mother)
- Relatives: David (grandson) Solomon (great-grandson)

Obed (Hebrew: עוֹבֵד, ‘Ōḇēḏ, also rendered Oved, "worshipper"), in the Bible, was a son of Boaz and Ruth. Obed was the father of Jesse, the grandfather of Israel’s King David.

The Hebrew Bible in its third (final) division — Writings (Ketuvim) — contains the Book of Ruth, which introduces Obed and describes his Israelite lineage and progeny in Bethlehem, Judea.

== Genealogies and commemoration ==
In Jewish scripture, the Book of Ruth and Chronicles trace Obed’s lineage and descendants:

Patriarchal line: Abraham → Isaac → Jacob →

Judahite line: Judah and Tamar → Perez → Hezron → Ram → Amminadab → Nahshon → Salmon →

Ruth/Obed line: Boaz, son of Salmon and Ruth → Obed (Oved) → Jesse → David

David’s sons:

  - Born in Hebron: Amnon, Daniel, Absalom, Adonijah, Shephatiah, and Ithream.
  - Born in Jerusalem: Shimea, Shobab, Nathan, Solomon, Ibhar, Elishama, Eliphelet, Nogah, Nepheg, Japhia, Elishama, Eliada, and Eliphelet.

Solomonic royal line: Solomon → Rehoboam → Abijah → Asa → Jehoshaphat → Joram → Ahaziah → Joash → Amaziah → Azariah → Jotham → Ahaz → Hezekiah → Manasseh → Amon → Josiah

Sons of Josiah:

  - Johanan, Jehoiakim, Zedekiah, and Shallum.

Descendants of Jehoiakim and Jeconiah:

  - Jehoiakim → Jeconiah
  - Sons of Jeconiah: Assir, Shealtiel, Malchiram, Pedaiah, Shenazzar, Jekamiah, Hoshama, and Nedabiah.

Descendants of Pedaiah and Zerubbabel:

  - Pedaiah → Zerubbabel
  - Sons of Zerubbabel: Meshullam, Hananiah, Hashubah, Ohel, Berechiah, Hasadiah, and Jushab-hesed; Shelomith is listed as their sister.

Later descendants:

  - Sons of Hananiah: Pelatiah and Jeshaiah.
  - Descendants also listed through Rephaiah, Arnan, Obadiah, and Shecaniah.
  - Shemaiah → Neariah → Elioenai
  - Sons of Elioenai: Hodaviah, Eliashib, Pelaiah, Akkub, Johanan, Delaiah, and Anani.

In Christian scripture, Obed is named as one of Jesus's ancestors in the genealogies recorded in the Gospel of Matthew and the Gospel of Luke. He is honored as a Patriarch on the Sunday of the Holy Ancestors in the Eastern Orthodox and Eastern Catholic churches.
