= List of minor Hebrew Bible figures, L–Z =

This article contains persons named in the Bible, specifically in the Hebrew Bible, of minor notability, about whom little or nothing is known, aside from some family connections. Here are the names which start with L-Z.

== L ==
=== Laadah ===
Laadah (Hebrew: לאדה) is one of the sons of Shelah, son of Judah (son of Jacob) in 1 Chronicles 4:21.

=== Laadan ===
See Libni

=== Ladan ===
See Libni

=== Lael ===
Lael (Hebrew לָאֵֽל "belonging to God") was a member of the house of Gershon according to Numbers 3:24. He was the father of Eliasaph. Neither of these is named in the Gershonite list in 1 Chronicles 23:7–11.

=== Lahmi ===
Lahmi, according to 1 Chronicles 20:5, was the brother of Goliath, killed by David's warrior Elhanan. See also Elhanan, son of Jair.

=== Laish ===
This entry is about the individual named Laish. For the city Dan, known also as Laish, see Dan (ancient city).

Laish is a name which appears in 1 Samuel 25:44 and 2 Samuel 3:15, where it is the name of the father of Palti, or Paltiel, the man who was married to Saul's daughter Michal before she was returned to David.

=== Lapidoth ===
Lapidoth (Hebrew: לַפִּידוֹת "torches") was the husband of Deborah, the fourth judge of Israel, according to Judges 4:4.

=== Lecar ===
In 1 Chronicles 4:41, Lecar is a son of Er, grandson of Shelah, and descendant of Judah. In some translations, Lecar is a place first settled by Er.

=== Letushim ===
Letushim appears as a son of Dedan according to Genesis 25:3. The name probably refers to a tribe rather than an individual.

=== Leummim ===
Leummim (Hebrew: לְאֻמִּים) was the third son of Dedan, son of Jokshan, son of Abraham and Keturah. The name probably refers to a tribe rather than an individual.

=== Libni ===
Libni (Hebrew לִבְנִי) was a son of Gershon of the house of Levi according to Exodus 6:17 and Numbers 3:18. He was born in Egypt. His descendants are referred to as the 'Libnites'. The first born son of Gershon is named as Laadan (or Ladan) in 1 Chronicles 23:7–9.

=== Likhi ===
Likhi (Hebrew: לִקְחִי "learning") son of Shemida is listed in a genealogy of the tribe of Manasseh. He is mentioned only in 1 Chronicles 7:19.

=== Lo-Ammi ===
Lo-Ammi (Hebrew: לֹא עַמִּי "Not-My-People") was the youngest son of Hosea and Gomer. He had an older brother named Jezreel and an older sister named Lo-Ruhamah. God commanded Hosea to name him "Lo-Ammi" to symbolize His anger with the people of Israel (see Hosea 1:1–9).

=== Lo-Ruhamah ===
Lo-Ruhamah (Hebrew: לֹא רֻחָמָה "not loved" or "unpitied") was the daughter of Hosea and Gomer. She had an older brother named Jezreel and a younger brother named Lo-Ammi. Her name was chosen by God to symbolize His displeasure with the people of Israel (see Hosea 1:1–9).

== M ==
=== Maacah ===
Maacah was the youngest child of Nahor and his concubine Reumah, only mentioned in one verse in the Bible which is Genesis 22:24.

=== Maadai ===
Maadai (מַעֲדַי "ornament of YHWH"), an exile and son of Bani is found in Ezra 10:34, in a list of men recorded as having married foreign women.

=== Maadiah ===
Maadiah (מַעֲדְיָה "adorned of JAH") appears in a list of priests and Levites said to have accompanied Zerubbabel in Nehemiah 12:5.

=== Maai ===
Maai (Hebrew: מָעַי) was a musician who was a relative of Zechariah, a descendant of Asaph. He is mentioned once, as part of the ceremony for the dedication of the rebuilt Jerusalem wall (Nehemiah 12:36), where he was part of the group that processed southwards behind Ezra. His name is omitted in the Septuagint translation of the passage, as are the names of five other relatives of Zechariah mentioned in the same verse. The name is otherwise unattested. Blenkinsopp suggests that Maai is a diminutive nickname. Mandel proposes its Hebrew origin means "sympathetic".

=== Maaseiah ===
Several men called Maaseiah (Hebrew מַעֲשֵׂיָה or מַעֲשֵׂיָהוּ maaseyah(u) "Work of YHWH") are mentioned in the Bible:

- One of the Levites whom David appointed as porter for the ark 1 Chronicles 15:18, 1 Chronicles 15:20
- One of the "captains of hundreds" associated with Jehoiada in restoring king Jehoash to the throne 2 Chronicles 23:1
- The "king's son", probably one of the sons of king Ahaz, killed by Zichri in the invasion of Judah by Pekah, king of Israel 2 Chronicles 28:7
- One who was sent by king Josiah to repair the temple 2 Chronicles 34:8. He was governor (Heb. sar, rendered elsewhere in the Authorized Version "prince," "chief captain", chief ruler") of Jerusalem.
- The father of the priest Zephaniah Jeremiah 21:1, 37:3
- The father of the false prophet Zedekiah Jeremiah 29:21
- a priest, the father of Neriah Jeremiah 32:12, 51:59
- The son of Shallum, "the keeper of the threshold" (Jeremiah 35:4) "may be the father of the priest Zephaniah mentioned in [Jeremiah] 21:1; 29:25; 37:3".
- One of the sons of Jeshua who had married a foreign wife during the exile (Ezra 10:18).

=== Maasiai ===
Hebrew for "Worker of Yahweh", one of the priests resident at Jerusalem at the Captivity 1 Chronicles 9:12

=== Maaz ===
Maaz (מַעַץ "wrath") was one of the sons of Ram the firstborn of Jerahmeel of the tribe of Judah. His brothers were: Jamin and Eker. He is mentioned briefly in 1 Chronicles 2:27.

=== Maaziah ===
- Head of the twenty-fourth and final priestly course in David's reign, 1 Chronicles 24:18.
- Also, a priest who signed the covenant named in Nehemiah 10:8.

=== Machbanai ===
Hebrew for "Clad with a mantle", one of the Gadite heroes who joined David in the wilderness 1 Chronicles 12:13

=== Machbena ===
Machbena or Machbenah (מַכְבֵּנָא "bond"), according to the only mention of him, in 1 Chronicles 2:49, was the son of Sheva the son of Caleb.

=== Machi ===
Machi (מָכִי "decrease") of the tribe of Gad was the father of Geuel, a scout sent to Canaan prior to the crossing of the Jordan River according to Numbers 13:15.

=== Machnadebai ===
Machnadebai (מַכְנַדְבַי "he brought low my willing ones"), one of the sons of Bani, is mentioned in the Hebrew Bible only once, in Ezra 10:40, where the name appears in a list of people alleged to have married foreign women.

=== Magpiash ===
Magpiash (מַגְפִּיעָשׁ), according to Nehemiah 10:20, was one of the men who signed a covenant between God and the people of Yehud Medinata.

=== Mahalath ===
1. Mahalath, one of the wives of Esau, and a daughter of Ishmael (Genesis 28:6–9). Thought to be the same as Basemath of Genesis 36.
2. Mahalath, a daughter of Jerimoth, son of David and Abihail, granddaughter of Jesse, the first-named wife of king Rehoboam in 2 Chronicles 11:18. She had three children: Jeush, Shamariah, and Zaham.

=== Mahali ===
Mahali (also Mahli) (Hebrew:מַחְלִי) was a son of Merari of the house of Levi according to Exodus 6:19, born in Egypt.

=== Mahath ===
Hebrew for "Grasping"

- A Kohathite Levite, father of Elkanah (different from Elkanah the father of Samuel) 1 Chronicles 6:35
- Another Kohathite Levite, of the time of Hezekiah. (2 Chronicles 29:12)

=== Mahazioth ===
Heb. "Visions", a Kohathite Levite, chief of the twenty-third course of musicians 1 Chronicles 25:4,1 Chronicles 25:30

=== Maher-shalal-hash-baz ===
Maher-shalal-hash-baz ("Hurry to spoil!" or "He has made haste to the plunder!") was the second mentioned son of the prophet Isaiah (Isaiah 8.1–4). The name is a reference to the impending plunder of Samaria and Damascus by the king of Assyria. The name is the longest personal name in the Bible.

=== Mahlah ===
Mahlah (מַחְלָה) is the name of two biblical persons:

- One of the daughters of Zelophehad, who with her four sisters brought a claim regarding inheritance before Moses. (Numbers 26:33, 27:1–11, 36; Joshua 17:3–6)
- A child of Gilead's sister Hammolecheth and great-granddaughter of Manasseh. She had two siblings, Ishhod and Abiezer. (1 Chr. 7:18–6)

=== Mahol ===
The father of four sons 1 Kings 4:31 who were inferior in wisdom only to Solomon.

=== Malcam ===
For the deity sometimes called Malcam, Malcham, or Milcom, see Moloch.

Malcam (King James Version spelling Malcham) (Hebrew: מַלְכָּם), son of Shaharaim and his wife Hodesh, appears only once in the Hebrew Bible in a genealogy of the Tribe of Benjamin.

=== Malchiel ===
Malchiel (Hebrew מַלְכִּיאֵל "my king is God") was a son of Beriah the son of Asher, according to Genesis 46:17 and Numbers 26:45. He was one of the 70 persons to migrate to Egypt with Jacob. According to 1 Chronicles 7:31, he was the ancestor of the Malchielites, a group within the Tribe of Asher.

=== Malchishua ===
Heb. "King of help" or "King of salvation", one of the four sons of Saul (1 Chronicles 8:33). He perished along with his father and brothers in the battle of Gilboa (1 Samuel 31:2).

=== Malchiah ===
Malchiah (Hebrew: מלכיהו malkiyahu "God is my king") son of the king (Jeremiah 38:6), owner of the pit into which Jeremiah was thrown

=== Mallothi ===
A Kohathite Levite, one of the 14 sons of Heman the Levite (1 Chronicles 25:4), and chief of the nineteenth division of the temple musicians 1 Chronicles 25:26

=== Malluch ===
There are two biblical figures named Malluch (מַלּוּךְ)

- A Levite of the family of Merari 1 Chronicles 6:44
- A priest who returned from Babylon (Neh. NIV),(Ezra 10:29),(Ezra 10:32)

=== Manahath ===
Manahath (מָנַחַת "rest") is one of the sons of Shobal and a descendant of Seir the Horite. His brothers names were: Ebal, Shepho, Onam, and Alvan (Genesis 36:23).

=== Maon ===
According to 1 Chronicles 2:45, Maon (מָעוֹן) was a member of the clan of Caleb, the son of Shammai and the father of Beth Zur.

=== Marsena ===
Marsena appears in Esther 1:14 as one of seven Persian and Medean princes. Marsena also advised King Ahasuerus. See also: Carshena. There exists the presumption that both counselors have Persian names.

=== Mash ===
Mash was a son of Aram according to Genesis 10:23. In Arabic traditions, Mash is considered the father of Nimrod (not Nimrod bin Kush bin Kanan), who begot Kinan, who in turn begot another Nimrod, and the lattermost's descendants mixed with those of Asshur (i.e. Assyrians). Tse Tsan-Tai identifies his descendants with the indigenous peoples of Siberia.

=== Massa ===
Hebrew word meaning tribute or burden, one of the sons of Ishmael, the founder of an Arabian tribe (Gen. 25:14); a nomadic tribe inhabiting the Arabian desert toward Babylonia.

=== Matred ===
Matred (מַטְרֵד "pushing forward"), according to Genesis 36:39 and 1 Chronicles 1:50, was the mother-in-law of the Edomite king Hadad II and the daughter of Me-zahab.

=== Matri ===
Matri, of the Tribe of Benjamin, was an ancestor of Saul according to 1 Samuel 10:21. Matri's clan, or the family of the Matrites, was chosen, and, from them, Saul the son of Kish was chosen to be king. The family of the Matrites is nowhere else mentioned in the Hebrew Bible; the conjecture, therefore, is that Matri is probably a corruption of Bikri, i.e. a descendant of Becher (Genesis 46:21).

=== Mattan ===
Mattan (Mathan in the Douay–Rheims translation) (Hebrew: מַתָּן) was a priest of the temple of Baal in Jerusalem who was killed during the uprising against Athaliah when King Azariah's remaining son, Jehoash, was appointed king of Judah (2 Kings 11:18).

=== Mattattah ===
Mattattah (KJV: Mattathah) (Hebrew: מַתַּתָּה "gift of YHWH") was one of the descendants of Hashum mentioned in Ezra 10:33 along with Mattenai, Zabda, Eliphelet, Jeremai, Manasseh and Shimei who married foreign wives.

=== Matthanias ===
Two men called Matthanias are mentioned in 1 Esdras, one each mentioned in 1 Esdras 9:27 and 9:31. In both passages, the parallel text in Ezra 10:26 and 10:30 contains the name Mattaniah.

=== Mehetabeel ===
Mehetabeel ("Whom God benefits" or "God causes good") was the father of Delaiah, and grandfather of Shemaiah, who joined Sanballat against Nehemiah (Nehemiah 6:10).

=== Mehetabel ===
Mehetabel ("מהיטבאל") ("Whom God benefits" or "God causes good") was the wife of Hadar, one of the kings of Edom (Genesis 36:39).

=== Mehir ===
Mehir (מְחִיר) son of Chelub the brother of Shuhah appears in a genealogy of the Tribe of Judah in 1 Chronicles 4:11.

=== Mehujael ===
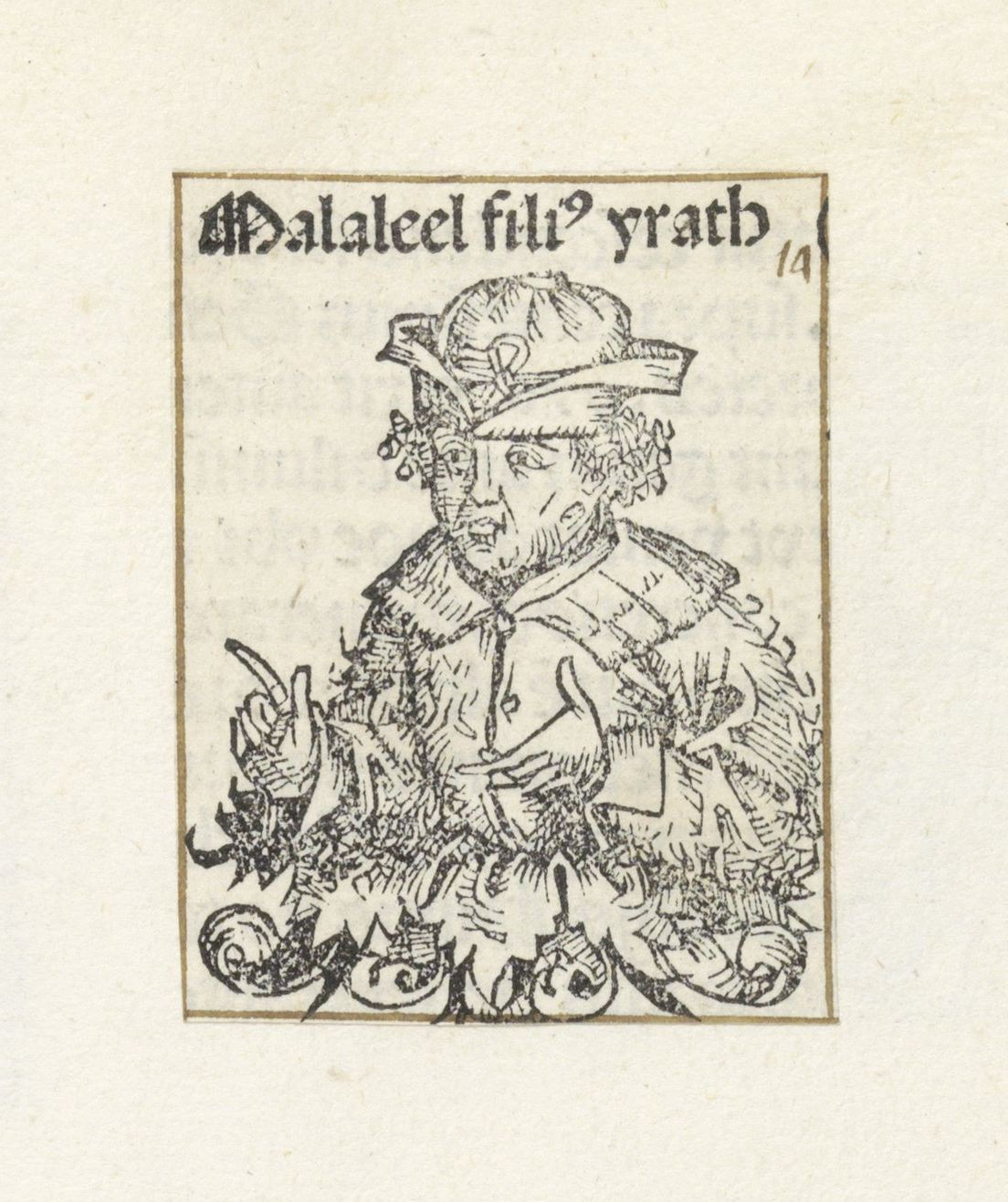
Mehujael as depicted in the Nuremberg Chronicle (1493).

In Genesis 4:18, Mehujael (Hebrew: מְחוּיָאֵל – Məḥūyāʾēl or מְחִיּיָאֵל; Greek: Μαιηλ – Maiēl) is a descendant of Cain, the son of Irad and the father of Methushael. The name means "El (or) the god enlivens."

=== Mehuman ===
Faithful, one of the 7 eunuchs whom Ahasuerus commanded to bring in Vashti (Esther 1:10).

Persian "مهمان signifies a stranger or guest"

=== Melatiah ===
Melatiah (מְלַטְיָה "YHWH delivered") the Gibeonite is a person who, according to Nehemiah 3:7, was responsible for rebuilding a portion of the wall of Jerusalem after the end of the Babylonian captivity.

=== Melech ===
Melech (מֶלֶךְ "King"), a Benjamite, the second of Micah's four sons (1 Chronicles 8:35), and thus grandson of Mephibosheth. Also related to a southwest Asian god, see Melech

=== Melzar ===
Probably a Persian word meaning master of wine, i.e., chief butler; the title of an officer at the Babylonian court Daniel 1:11, Daniel 1:16 who had charge of the diet of the Hebrew youths. Daniel had a providential relationship of "favour and tender love" with Melzar (Daniel 1:9).

=== Merab ===
Merab (מֵרָב "increase") was the elder of Saul's two daughters (1 Samuel 14:49). She was offered in marriage to David after his victory over Goliath, but does not seem to have entered heartily into this arrangement (1 Samuel 18:17–19). She was at length, however, married to Adriel of Abel-Meholah, a town in the Jordan valley, about 10 miles south of Bethshean (Beit She'an), with whom the house of Saul maintained an alliance. She had five sons, who were all put to death by impalement by the Gibeonites on the hill of Gibeah (2 Samuel 21:8). Merab is also a common feminine name in Israel.

=== Meraiah ===
A chief priest after the exile, a contemporary of the high priest Joiakim (Neh 12:12).

=== Meraioth ===
- Father of Amariah, a priest of the line of Eleazar (1 Chronicles 6:6–7), (1 Chronicles 6:52). It is uncertain if he ever was the high priest.
- A priest who went to Jerusalem with Zerubbabel (Nehemiah 12:15). He is called Meremoth in Neh 12:3.

=== Meremoth ===
A priest who returned from Babylon with Zerubbabel (Nehemiah 12:3), who took receipt of the sacred vessels belonging to the temple from Ezra and his party when they returned to Jerusalem (Ezra 8:33). His father is named as Uriah. In the Greek 1 Esdras (King James Version) he is identified as " Marmoth the priest the son of Iri". Meremoth took part in rebuilding the walls of Jerusalem (Nehemiah 3:4).

=== Meres ===
Meres is listed in Esther 1:14 as one of seven officials in the service of Ahasuerus.

=== Meshelemiah ===
A Levite of the family of the Korhites, called also Shelemiah (1 Chronicles 9:21),(1 Chronicles 26:1–14) He was a temple gate-keeper in the time of David.

=== Meshillemoth ===
Two men called Meshillemoth (in one case spelled Meshillemith) are mentioned in the Bible.

- The father of Berechiah, a member of the Tribe of Ephraim during the time when Pekah was king.
- A priest, the son of Immer. He is called "Meshillemoth" in 1 Chronicles 9:12.

=== Meshullam ===
See Meshullam

=== Meshullemeth ===
The wife of King Manasseh of Judah, daughter of Haruz of Jotbah, and the mother of King Amon of Judah (2 Kings 21:19).

=== Methusael ===
In Genesis 4:18, Methusael or Methushael (Hebrew: מְתוּשָׁאֵל – Məṯūšāʾēl) is a descendant of Cain, the son of Mehujael and the father of Lamech.

=== Mezahab ===
Mezahab (Hebrew: מֵיזָהָב "Waters of Gold") The father of Matred (Gen 36:39),(1 Chronicles 1:50), and grandfather of Mehetabel, wife of Hadar, the last king of Edom.

=== Miamin ===
See Mijamin

=== Mibhar ===
A Hagarene, one of David's warriors (1 Chronicles 11:38); called also Bani the Gadite (2 Samuel 23:36).

=== Mibsam ===
- One of Ishmael's twelve sons, and head of an Arab tribe (Gen 25:13).
- A descendant of Simeon (1 Chronicles 4:25).

=== Mibzar ===
Mibzar (מִבְצָר "fortress") was an Edomite clan (possibly named after an eponymous chieftain) mentioned in Genesis 36:31-43.

=== Micah ===
Micah was the son of Shimei and The Father of Reaiah.

=== Michael ===
Michael (is the masculine given name that comes from Hebrew: מִיכָאֵל / מיכאל (Mīkhāʼēl, pronounced [miχaˈʔel]), derived from the question מי כאל mī kāʼēl, meaning "Who is like God?") is the name of 8 minor biblical individuals besides from the Archangel Michael.

- Michael of the house of Asher was the father of Sethur, a scout sent to Canaan prior to the crossing of the Jordan River according to Numbers 13:13.
- Michael was the oldest son of Izrahiah, a descendant of Issachar according to 1 Chronicles 7:1-3
- Michael was the 6th son of Beriah the head of the family of those living in Aijalon and who drove out the inhabitants of Gath of the tribe of Benjamin. (1 Chronicles 8:16)
- Michael was a chief Gadite in Bashan. (1 Chronicles 5:13)
- Michael was a Manassite and one of David's mighty warriors in Ziklag. (1 Chronicles 2:20)
- Michael was an ancestor of Asaph as the son of Baaseiah and the father of Shimea as a Gershonite Levite. (1 Chronicles 6:40)
- Michael was the father of Omri, the leader of the tribe of Judah and the time of David. (1 Chronicles 27:18)
- Michael was one of the sons of King Jehoshaphat who was killed by Joram his brother in the process of being king. (2 Chronicles 21:2–4)

=== Michaiah ===
Two men called Michaiah (Hebrew: מיכיה Mikayah "Who is like Yah?") are mentioned in the Bible:

- Michaiah, son of Imlah
- Michaiah, son of Gemariah, son of Shaphan (Jeremiah 36:11), who heard Baruch's reading of the oracles of YHVH to Jeremiah, and reported to king Johoiakim

=== Michri ===
"Prize of Jehovah" or "Selling", a Benjamite, the father of Uzzi (1 Chronicles 9:8).

=== Mijamin ===
Three men called Mijamin (also spelled Miamin, Miniamin, Minjamin) ("from the right hand") are mentioned in the Bible:

- The head of the sixth of twenty four priestly divisions set up by King David. (1 Chronicles 24:9)
- A chief priest who returned from Babylon with Zerubbabel (Nehemiah 12:5), who signed the renewed covenant with God. (Nehemiah 10:8) In the time of Joiakim his family had joined with that of Moadiah, and was led by Piltai. He was also called Miniamin. (Neh 12:17)
- A non-priestly Mijamin son of Parosh is mentioned in Ezra 10:25 as one of those who divorced a gentile wife, and sacrificed a ram in atonement.

=== Mikloth ===
1. An officer under Dodai, in the time of David and Solomon (1 Chronicles 27:4).
2. One of the sons of Jeiel, the father or prince of Gibeon and his wife Maacah; a Benjamite (1 Chronicles 8:32),(1 Chronicles 9:37), (1 Chronicles 9:38).

=== Milalai ===
A Levitical musician (Neh 12:36) who took part in the dedication of the wall of Jerusalem. Son of the priest Jonathan and a descendant of Asaph.

=== Miniamin ===
Miniamin (or Mijamin) (Hebrew:מִנְיָמִין) was one of the agents appointed under Kore in the time of King Hezekiah to distribute a share of the plenty to the priests in the Levitical cities of Judah (2 Chronicles 31:15.

=== Minjamin ===
See Mijamin

=== Mishael ===
Two men called Mishael (Hebrew מִישָׁאֵל 'Who is like God (El)?') are mentioned in the Bible:

Mishael was a son of Uzziel of the house of Levi according to Exodus 6:22, born in Egypt. He was a nephew of Amram and a cousin of Aaron, Miriam, and Moses. He and Elzaphan were asked by Moses to carry away Nadab's and Abihu's bodies to a place outside the camp. (Leviticus 10:4)

Mishael was one of the three Hebrew youths who were trained with Daniel in Babylon (Dan. 1:11, 19). He and his companions were cast into and miraculously delivered from the fiery furnace for refusing to worship the king's idol (3:13–30). Mishael's Babylonian name was Meshach.

=== Mishma ===
- Mishma (מִשְׁמָע) is the name of 2 biblical individuals.
- A son of Shaul, son of Simeon (Berean Standard Bible: 1 Chronicles 4:24-25)

24. The descendants of Simeon: Nemuel, Jamin, Jarib, Zerah, and Shaul.

25. The sons of Shaul: Shallum, Mibsam, and Mishma.

<Contemporary English Version:1 Chronicles 4:24-25>

25. The descendants of Shaul included his son Shallum, his grandson Mibsam, and his great-grandson Mishma.

<Berean Standard Bible: 1 Chronicles 4:24-25><Contemporary English Version:1 Chronicles 4:24-2>

- The fifth son of Ishmael (Genesis 25:14;1 Chronicles 1:30).

=== Mishmannah ===
(Hebrew מִשְׁמַנָּה) one of the Gadite heroes who gathered to David at Ziklag (1 Chronicles 12:10).

=== Mithredath ===
(Hebrew: מִתְרְדָת; Greek: Μιθραδάτης; Latin: Mithridates) The Hebrew form of the Persian name Mithridates meaning 'given/dedicated to the sun'.

- The "treasurer" of King Cyrus (Ezra 1:8).
- A Persian officer in Samaria (Ezra 4:7).

=== Moab ===
Moab was the son of Lot and his eldest daughter. He became the father of the Moabites (see Genesis 19:36–37).

=== Molid ===
מוֹלִיד

- A son of Abishur of the tribe of Judah in 1 Chronicles 2:29.

=== Moza ===
(Hebrew מוֹצָא)

- One of the sons of Caleb (1 Chronicles 2:46).
- The son of Zimri, of the posterity of Saul (1 Chronicles 8:36–37),(1 Chronicles 9:42–43).

=== Muppim ===
Muppim (Hebrew מֻפִּים) or Shuphim was the eighth son of Benjamin in Genesis 46:21 and Numbers 26:39.

=== Mushi ===
Mushi (Hebrew מוּשִׁי) was a son of Merari of the house of Levi according to Exodus 6:19, born in Egypt.

== N ==
=== Naam ===
Naam (נַעַם "pleasantness") was one of the sons of Caleb son of Jephunneh (1 Chronicles 4:15). His brothers were Iru and Elam.

=== Naaman ===
Naaman is the fifth son of Benjamin in Genesis 46:21, but the son of Bela and therefore the grandson of Benjamin according to Numbers 26:38-40 and 1 Chronicles 8:4 He is not mentioned among the sons of Bela in 1 Chronicles 7:7. He was among the family of Jacob that went down to Egypt.

=== Naarah ===
According to the Hebrew Bible, Naarah (נַעֲרָה "maiden") was one of the two wives of Ashur the son of Hezron which bore Ashur: Ahuzam, Hepher, Temeni and Haahashtari according to 1 Chronicles 4:6.

=== Naboth ===
Naboth was a minor figure known for owning a vineyard that king Ahab wished to have for himself. When Naboth was unwilling to give up the vineyard, Ahab's wife Jezebel instigated a plot to have Naboth killed. See 1 Kings 21.

=== Nadab ===
Nadab is the name of 4 biblical individuals

- A son of Aaron and a High Priest mentioned many times in the Hebrew Bible.
- Nadab a King of Israel and a son of Jeroboam I assassinated by Baasha of Israel. He is mentioned in 1 Kings 14:20, 15:25, 15:27, 15:31.
- A Jerahmeelite, son of Shammai and brother of Abishur mentioned in 1 Chronicles 2:28.
- A son of Gibeon of the tribe of Benjamin mentioned in 1 Chronicles 9:36.

=== Naharai ===
Naharai (or Nahari) (Hebrew: נַחֲרַי "snorter") the Beerothite is listed in 2 Samuel 23:37 and 1 Chronicles 11:39 as one of David's Mighty Warriors and the armor bearer of Joab.

=== Nahath ===
Three men called Nahath (נַחַת "rest") appear in the Bible.

- Nahath, son of Reuel, son of Esau appears in a genealogy of the Edomites, found in Genesis 36:13 and repeated in 1 Chronicles 1:37. According to the Encyclopaedia Biblica', this Nahath is probably the same figure as the Naham of 1 Chronicles 4:19 and the Naam of 1 Chronicles 4:15.
- A Nahath appears in the ancestry of Samuel according to 1 Chronicles 6:26 (verse 11 in some Bibles).
- A Nahath appears in a list of Levite supervisors in the time of Hezekiah, in 2 Chronicles 31:13

=== Nahbi ===
Nahbi (נַחְבִּי "hidden"), the son of Vophsi of the house of Naphtali, was a scout sent to Canaan prior to the crossing of the Jordan River according to Numbers 13:14.

=== Naphish ===
Naphish (once Nephish in the King James Version, Douay–Rheims: Naphis) is one of the sons of Ishmael. After him an Ishmaelite tribe is named. The name נפיש in Hebrew means "refreshed". His tribe is listed after Jetur, and is assumed to have resided nearby and lived a nomadic, animal-herding lifestyle in sparsely populated land east of the Israelites. Psalm 83, however, lists these as Hagarites separately from the other ten tribes who lived further to the south.

=== Naphtuhim ===
Naphtuhim (נַפְתֻּחִים) is a son of Mizraim and grandson of Ham first mentioned in Genesis 10:13. According to the medieval biblical exegete, Saadia Gaon, his descendants inhabited the town of Birma (Al Gharbiyah region, Egypt), and were formerly known as Parmiin.

=== Neariah ===
Two men called "Neariah" (נְעַרְיָה "servant of YHWH") appear in the Bible.

- Neariah the son of Shemaiah, was a descendant of David, and father of Elionenai in the time after the captivity (1 Chronicles 3:22).
- The other Neariah was, according to 1 Chronicles, a son of Ishi and a leader in the Tribe of Simeon who, in the days of king Hezekiah of Judah, drove out the Amalekites from Mount Seir (1 Chronicles 4:42)

=== Nebat ===
Nebat (Hebrew: נבט nebat "Sprout", Douay–Rheims: Nabat), an Ephraimite of Zereda, was the father of King Jeroboam.

=== Nebuzaradan ===
Nebuzaradan (the biblical form of his name, derived from the Babylonian form Nabu-zar-iddin, meaning "Nabu has given a seed") was the captain of Nebuchadnezzar's bodyguard at the capture of Jerusalem, according to the Bible. He is mentioned in 2 Kings 25:8, 11, 20;Jeremiah 52:30; Jeremiah 39:9,11, 40:2, 5. His name is mentioned in a prism in Istanbul (No. 7834), found in Babylon where he is listed as the "chief cook".

=== Nedabiah ===
Nedabiah (נְדַבְיָה: "whom YHWH impels") was one of the sons of king Jeconiah, according to 1 Chronicles 3:18.

=== Nehum ===
See Rehum

=== Nehushta ===
Nehushta (נְחֻשְׁתָּא "brass") was the wife of King Jehoiakim and daughter of Elnathan ben Achbor of Jerusalem, according 2 Kings 24:8. She was also the mother of King Jehoiachin.

=== Nekoda ===
Nekoda (נְקוֹדָא) was the ancestor of 652 Jews who returned from Babylonia with Ezra, but were declared ineligible to serve as Kohanim (priests) because they could not prove that their ancestors had been Kohanim. This is recounted in Ezra 2:48,60 and in Nehemiah 7:50, 62, where the number of men is given as 642.

=== Nemuel ===
Two men called Nemuel are mentioned in the Bible:

- The son of Eliab of the Tribe of Reuben according to Numbers 26:9.
- Jemuel, a son of Simeon.

=== Nepheg ===
Two men called Nepheg (נֶפֶג) are mentioned in the Bible:

- A son of Izhar of the house of Levi according to Exodus 6:21, born in Egypt. He was a nephew of Amram and a cousin of Aaron, Miriam, and Moses.
- A son of David born to him at Jerusalem according to 2 Samuel 5:15.

=== Nephish ===
See Naphish

=== Ner ===
Ner (Hebrew: "Candle") was an uncle of Saul and the father of Abner according to 1 Samuel 14:50.

=== Nethaniah ===
Nethaniah (נְתַנְיָה), son of Asaph, was one of the musicians appointed by David for the musical service of the Temple (1 Chronicles 25:2, 12).

=== Noadiah ===
Noadiah (נוֹעַדְיָה) was a false prophetess mentioned in Nehemiah 6:14, one of the antagonists to Nehemiah who sought to discourage him from rebuilding the defensive walls of Jerusalem. Nehemiah calls on God to "remember" her, or in the King James Version, to "think thou upon [her]".

=== Nobah ===
Nobah (נֹבַח "barking"), of the Tribe of Manasseh defeated the Amorites, took the villages of Kenath and renamed it Nobah according to Numbers 32:42.

=== Nogah ===
Nogah (נֹגַהּ "brightness"), a son of David, appears in two lists of David's sons born to him in Jerusalem: 1 Chronicles 3:7 and 1 Chronicles 14:6.

== O ==
=== Obadiah ===
Obadiah was a descendant of David, father of Sheconiah, and son of Arnan

=== Obal ===
Obal, also Ebal, was a son of Joktan according to Genesis 10:28, 1 Chronicles 1:22.

=== Obed ===
Obed (עוֹבֵד) was the father of Azariah, one of the "commanders of the hundreds" who formed part of Jehoiada's campaign to restore the kingship to Joash in 2 Chronicles 23:1.

=== Obil ===
Obil (אוֹבִיל) was an Ishmaelite, a keeper of camels in the time of David, according to 1 Chronicles 27:30.

=== Ocran ===
Ocran (עׇכְרָן "troubled") was a member of the house of Asher according to Numbers 1:13. He was the father of Pagiel.

=== Ohad ===
Ohad (אֹהַד "united") was the third son of Simeon according to Genesis 46:10 and Exodus 6:15. He was one of the 70 souls to migrate to Egypt with Jacob.

=== On ===
On (אוֹן), the son of Peleth, of the Tribe of Reuben, was a participant in Korah's rebellion against Moses according to Numbers 16:1. On is referred to as "Hon" in the Douai Bible translation. He is mentioned alongside Korah, Dathan and Abiram as the instigators of the rebellion, but not referred to later when Korah, Dathan and Abiram were challenged and punished for their rebellion.

=== Onam ===
Onam (אוֹנָם "vigorous") was the name of 2 biblical figures:

- Onam one of the sons of Shobal (Genesis 36:23).
- Onam the son of Jerahmeel and the step-brother of his brothers. His mother was named Atarah (1 Chronicles 2:26).

=== Ophir ===
Ophir (אוֹפִיר) was the eleventh son of Joktan according to Genesis 10:29, 1 Chronicles 1:23.

=== Oren ===
Oren (אֹרֶן "cedar") was a son of Jerahmeel according to 1 Chronicles 2:25.

=== Ozem ===
Two men called Ozem (Hebrew אצם, 'oTsehM, "Urgency") appear in the Bible.

1. The sixth son of Jesse and thus a brother of David (1 Chronicles 2:15).
2. A son of Jerahmeel (1 Chronicles 2:25).

=== Ozni ===
See Ezbon.

== P ==
=== Pagiel ===
Pagiel (Hebrew פַּגְעִיאֵל) was a son of Ocran, a prince of the house of Asher and one of the leaders of the tribes of Israel, according to Numbers 1:13.

=== Palti ===
This is about the Palti mentioned in Numbers. For the other biblical Palti, see Palti, son of Laish.

Palti (פַּלְטִי "my deliverance"), the son of Raphu of the house of Benjamin, was a scout sent to Canaan prior to the crossing of the Jordan River according to Numbers 13:9.

=== Paltiel ===
This is about the Paltiel in the Book of Numbers. For the other Paltiel, see Palti, son of Laish.

Paltiel (Hebrew פַּלְטִיאֵל "delivered by God") was a prince of the tribe of Issachar, one of those appointed by Moses to superintend the division of Canaan among his tribe (Num. 34:26).

=== Parmashta ===
Parmashta appears briefly in Esther 9:9, where he is listed as one of the ten sons of Haman, who is the primary antagonist of the Book of Esther because of his desire to wipe out the Jews.

=== Parnach ===
Parnach (פַּרְנַךְ "delicate") was the father of Elizaphan, a prince of the Tribe of Zebulun chosen to help apportion the promised land between the tribes. (Num. 34:25).

=== Parosh ===
Parosh also called Pharosh (פַּרְעֹשׁ), was the name of at least 2 biblical individuals.

- An ancestor of one of the families who returned from the exile with Zerubbabel and Ezra (Ezra 2:3 10:25, Nehemiah 3:25 7:8).
- One of the chiefs mentioned in Nehemiah 10:14 and a leader of the people who signed the covenant with Nehemiah.

=== Parshandatha ===
Parshandatha, also Pharsandatha, was one of the ten sons of Haman. He was killed by a Jew or Jews (the account in the Book of Esther is unclear) and Esther had his corpse impaled (see Esther 9:5–14).

=== Paruah ===
Paruah (פָּרוּחַ "sprout") is mentioned in 1 Kings 4:17 as the father of "Jehoshaphat son of Peruah", a governor governing the territory of the Tribe of Issachar under Solomon.

=== Paseah ===
Paseah (פָּסֵחַ "limper") is the name of two figures in the Hebrew Bible. In a genealogy of Judah, a Paseah appears (1 Chronicles 4:12) as the son of Eshton, the son of Mehir, the son of Chelub. Another Paseah is mentioned indirectly (Nehemiah 3:6) by way of his son Jehoiada, a repairer of a section of the wall of Jerusalem.

=== Pedahel ===
Pedahel (פְּדַהְאֵל "ransomed by God") Son of Ammihud and prince of the tribe of Naphtali; one of those appointed by Moses to superintend the division of Canaan amongst the tribe (Num. 34:28).

=== Pedahzur ===
Pedahzur (פְּדָהצוּר "the Rock has ransomed") was a member of the house of Manasseh according to Numbers 1:10. He was the father of Gamaliel.

=== Pelaiah ===
Two men called Pelaiah (פְּלָיָה "YHWH does wonders") are mentioned in the Bible.

- In 1 Chronicles 3:23, a Pelaiah appears in a genealogy of the descendants of David. He is listed as one of the sons of Elioenai, the son of Neariah, the son of Shemaiah, the son of Shechaniah.
- The other Pelaiah appears in Nehemiah (8:7; 10:10) as a Levite who helped to explain biblical law to the inhabitants of Yehud Medinata and signed a document against intermarriage between Jews and non-Jews.

=== Pelaliah ===
Pelaliah (Hebrew Pĕlalyāh) is mentioned in Nehemiah 11:12, which lists a descendant of his as a priestly leader in Jerusalem. The descendant is specified as "Adaiah son of Jeroham son of Pelaliah son of Amzi son of Zechariah son of Pashhur son of Malchiah."

=== Pelatiah ===
Pelatiah (Hebrew: פלטיהו Pelatyahu, meaning "whom Jehovah delivered") the son of Benaiah, a prince of the people (Ezekiel 11:1), was among the 25 men who Ezekiel saw at the East Gate of the temple. He fell dead upon hearing the prophecy regarding Jerusalem (Ezekiel 11:13).

Another Pelatiah appears as being the son of Hananiah the son of Zerubbabel. He is mentioned in 2 passages: 1 Chronicles 3:21 and 1 Chronicles 4:42.

The last Pelatiah is one of the people mentioned in Nehemiah 10:22 who sealed the covenant.

=== Pelet ===
Pelet (פֶּלֶט "deliverance") was one of the sons of Azmaveth, according to 1 Chronicles 12:3, who supported King David at Ziklag.

=== Peleth ===
There are 2 biblical individuals named Peleth (פֶּלֶת "swiftness")

- Peleth, of the Tribe of Reuben, was the father of On, a participant in Korah's rebellion against Moses according to Numbers 16:1.
- Peleth one of the sons of Jonathan the son of Jada, and the brother of Zaza.

=== Peresh ===
According to 1 Chronicles 7:16, Peresh (פֶּרֶשׁ) was the son of Machir, the son of Manasseh.

=== Pethahiah ===
Three men called Pethahiah (פְּתַחְיָה) are named in the Bible.

1. A levite, mentioned in Nehemiah 10:23 and Nehemiah 9:5.
2. Pethahiah ben Meshezabel, who was one of the "sons of Zerah" of the Tribe of Judah.
3. Pethahiah was one of the priest in the temple service ordained by David. (1 Chronicles 24:16)

=== Pethuel ===
Pethuel (פְּתוּאֵל "vision of God"), the father of Joel, in Joel 1:1.

=== Peulthai ===
Peulthai (פְּעֻלְּתַי "work"), according to 1 Chronicles 26:5, was the eighth of Obed-edom's eight sons. The passage in which they are listed records gatekeepers of the temple at Jerusalem.

=== Phallu ===
Phallu or Pallu (פַּלּוּא "distinguished") was a son of Reuben according to Genesis 46:9, Exodus 6:14 and Numbers 26:5. He was one of the 70 souls to migrate to Egypt with Jacob.

=== Phalti ===
For the individual called "Phalti" in the King James Bible, see Palti, son of Laish.

=== Phaltiel ===
For the individual called "Paltiel" in the King James Bible, see Palti, son of Laish.

=== Phurah ===
Phurah (פֻּרָה "bough") was a servant of Gideon in Judges 7. Gideon takes Phurah with him to spy on the Midianites before battle.

=== Phuvah ===
Phuvah or Pua (פּוּאָה "splendid") was a son of Issachar according to Genesis 46:13 and Numbers 26:23. He was one of the 70 souls to migrate to Egypt with Jacob.

=== Pildash ===
Pildash (פִּלְדָּשׁ "flame of fire") was the sixth son of Nahor and Milcah (Genesis 22:22).

=== Pinon ===
Pinon (פִּינֹן "darkness") is listed as one of the "chiefs" of Edom, in Genesis 36:41, and, in a copy of the same list, in 1 Chronicles 1:52.

=== Piram ===
Piram (פִּרְאָם "like a wild ass"), according to Joshua 10:3, was the Amorite king of Jarmuth.

=== Pochereth-hazzebaim ===
Pochereth-hazzebaim (פֹּכֶרֶת הַצְּבָיִים "here the cutting off") was one of Solomon's servants whose descendants returned from the exile with Zerubbabel. (Nehemiah 7:59;Ezra 2:57) He was the head of a family who returned from Babylon. The King James Version has his name modified into Pochereth of Hazzebeim but of was not in 1611 edition of the KJV. In 1 Esdras 5:34 he is called Phacareth.

=== Poratha ===
Poratha, according to Esther 9:8, was one of the ten sons of Haman, the antagonist of the Book of Esther who attempted to wipe out the Jewish people.

=== Pul ===
Pul was an abbreviation for the Assyrian king Tiglath-Pileser III. Pul attacked Israel in the reign of Menahem and extracted tribute.

=== Putiel ===
Putiel (פּוּטִיאֵל "afflicted of God") was the father of Eleazar's wife according to Exodus 6:25. According to Rashi this was another name of Jethro.

== Q ==
=== Qedar ===
Qedar (Kedar): see Qedarites: Biblical

== R ==
=== Raamiah ===
Raamiah (Hebrew רַעַמְיָה) is one of the princes who returned from the Exile (Neh. 7:7). He is also called Reelaiah in Ezra 2:2.

=== Rabmag ===
Rabmag (Hebrew רַב־מָג, from Assyrian "Rab-mugi") was a "chief physician" attached to the king of Babylon (Jeremiah 39:3,13).

=== Raddai ===
Raddai (Hebrew: רַדַּי "trampling"), according to 1 Chronicles 2:14, was the 5th son of Jesse and one of the brothers of King David.

=== Rakem ===
See Rekem.

=== Ramiah ===
Ramiah (Hebrew: רַמְיָה "Jehovah has loosened"), according to Ezra 10:25, was an Israelite layperson, a member of the group named "sons of Parosh", who was guilty of marrying a foreign woman.

=== Rapha ===
Rapha, according to the Septuagint version of 2 Samuel 21:16, was the parent of Jesbi, the name in that version for the giant referred to in the Massoretic text as Ishbi-benob. In the Latin Vulgate, he is referred to as Arapha or Arafa.

=== Raphu ===
Raphu (Hebrew: רָפוּא "healed") of the house of Benjamin was the father of Palti, a scout sent to Canaan prior to the crossing of the Jordan River according to Numbers 13:9.

=== Rechab ===
Rechab (Hebrew: רֵכָב Rēḵāḇ) is the name of three men in the Bible:

- One of the two "captains of bands" whom Saul's son Ish-bosheth took into his service, and who conspired to kill him. (2 Samuel 4:2)
- A Kenite, mentioned as the father of Jehonadab at King Jehu's time, from whom the tribe of the Rechabites derived their name. Jehonadab and his people had all along become worshippers of God.
- The father of Malchiah, ruler of part of Beth-haccerem and repairer of the wall of Jerusalem. (Nehemiah 3:14)

=== Regem ===
Regem (Hebrew: רֶגֶם "friend") is named in 1 Chronicles 2:47 as one of the sons of Jahdai, a figure who appears in a genealogy associated with Caleb.

=== Regem-melech ===
A figure called Regem-melech (Hebrew: רֶגֶם מֶלֶךְ "king's heap"), along with a "Sharezer", came, according to some interpretations of Zechariah 7:2, to Bethel to ask a question about fasts. It is unclear whether the name is intended as a title or as a proper name. The grammar of the verse is difficult and several interpretations have been proposed.

=== Rehabiah ===
Rehabiah (Hebrew: רְחַבְיָה "YHWH has enlarged") is a figure mentioned three times in the Hebrew Bible, as the ancestor of a group of Levites. He is identified as the only son of Eliezer the son of Moses (1 Chronicles 23:17; 26:25). Chronicles identifies him as the father of a person named Isshiah (Hebrew Yiššiyāh, 1 Chronicles 24:21) or Jeshaiah (Hebrew Yĕshaʿyāhû, 1 Chronicles 26:25).

=== Rehob ===
Rehob (Hebrew: רחב which can be translated into Rahab) was the name of 2 biblical figures:

- The father of Hadadezer the king of Zobah and could possibly be the predecessor of Hadadezer. He is mentioned in 2 Samuel 8:3 and 2 Samuel 8:12.
- One of the Levites who sealed the covenant with Nehemiah mentioned in Nehemiah 10:11.

=== Rehum ===
Rehum refers to four or five biblical figures.

1. A Rehum is mentioned in Ezra 2:2, who is called Nehum in Nehemiah 7:7. He appears in passing, in two copies of a list of people said to have come from Persia to Yehud Medinata under the leadership of Nehemiah. He may be the same individual mentioned in Nehemiah 12:3.
2. A Rehum is mentioned in Nehemiah 12:3, where he is listed as part of a group of priests associated with Zerubbabel.
3. Rehum son of Bani, a Levite, appears in a list of people who contributed to building Nehemiah's wall in Nehemiah 3:17.
4. Rehum, a member of a group of priests associated with Zerubbabel according to Nehemiah 12:3.
5. Rehum was an official, according to Ezra 4:8–23, who along with collaborators opposed the Jewish attempt to rebuild Jerusalem.

=== Rephaiah ===
Rephaiah is the name of 3 biblical figures:

- Rephaiah (Hebrew רְפָיָה "the Lord has healed"), a descendant of David was the father of Arnan and the son of Jeshaiah.
- Rephaiah the son of Hur the ruler of the half part of Jerusalem according to the Book of Nehemiah.
- Rephaiah the son of Binea and the father of Eleasah, also called Rapha.

=== Reba ===
Reba was one of five Midianite kings killed during the time of Moses by an Israelite expedition led by Phinehas, son of Eleazar according to Numbers 31:8 and Joshua 13:21.

=== Rekem ===
This is about individuals in the Bible named Rekem. For the city by that name, see List of minor biblical places § Rekem.

Rekem (Hebrew רֶקֶם) refers to more than one individual in the Hebrew Bible:

- Rekem was one of five Midianite kings killed during the time of Moses by an Israelite expedition led by Phinehas, son of Eleazar according to Numbers 31:8 and Joshua 13:21. Josephus identifies Rekem with the king who built Petra, a city later associated with the Nabateans. He indicates that in his time the local population still called it Rekem after this founder, and in fact, according to modern scholarship the Nabateans themselves referred to it by this name RQM (רקם) in the Aramaic alphabet they used, spelled identically as the Biblical name.
- According to 1 Chronicles 2:43–44, Hebron, a figure associated with the biblical Caleb, was the father of a person named Rekem.
- According to 1 Chronicles 7:16, Machir the son of Manasseh was the ancestor of a figure named Rekem. In this last passage, the King James Version spells the name as Rakem.

=== Rephael ===
In 1 Chronicles 26:7–8, Rephael (Hebrew: רְפָאֵל, Modern: Refaʾel, Tiberian: Rəp̄āʾēl, "healed of God") was one of Shemaiah's sons. He and his brethren, on account of their "strength for service," formed one of the divisions of the temple porters.

=== Reumah ===
Reumah (Hebrew: רְאוּמָה "elevated"), according to Genesis 22:24, was the concubine of Abraham's brother Nahor, and the mother of his children Tebah, Gaham, Tahash, and Maachah.

=== Rezon ===
According to 1 Kings 11:23, Rezon (Hebrew: רזון Rezon) became regent in Damascus and was an adversary of Solomon.

=== Ribai ===
Ribai (Hebrew: רִיבַי "pleader with YHWH"), a Benjamite of Gibeah, was the father of Ittai, one of King David's Warriors (2 Samuel 23:29, 1 Chronicles 11:31).

=== Rinnah ===
Rinnah (Hebrew: רִנָּה "shout") appears once in the Bible, as the son of a man named Shimon (1 Chronicles 4:20) in a genealogy of Tribe of Judah. Neither Shimon's origin nor precise relationship to Judah is given.

=== Rohgah ===
In 1 Chronicles 7, Rohgah, also spelled Rohagah, was one of the sons of Shamer (the vocalization found in v. 34) or Shomer (the vocalization found in v. 32), who is identified as the son of Heber, the son of Beriah, the son of the tribal patriarch Asher.

=== Romamti-ezer ===
Romamti-ezer (Hebrew: רוֹמַמְתִּי עֶזֶר "I have exalted the Helper") appears twice in the Hebrew Bible, both times in 1 Chronicles 25. In verse 4 he is identified as one of the fourteen sons of Heman, one of three men who according to Chronicles were assigned to be in charge of musical worship in the Temple of Jerusalem. Later in the chapter, 288 assigned to the musical service are divided into twenty-four groups of twelve. The twenty-fourth group is assigned to Romamti-ezer (verse 31).

=== Rosh ===
Hebrew: ראש rosh "Head"

Rosh is the seventh of the ten sons of Benjamin named in Genesis 46:21.

A nation named Rosh is also possibly mentioned in Ezekiel 38:2–3, 39:1 "Son of man, set your face toward Gog, the land of Magog, the prince of Rosh, Meshech, and Tubal; and prophesy concerning him."

This translation "Rosh" is found in NASB but not in KJV and most modern versions. Also in a variant reading of Isaiah 66:19 (MT) and the Septuagint Jeremiah 32:23. Many scholars categorize this as a mistranslation of נְשִׂ֕יא רֹ֖אשׁ, nesi ro'š ("chief prince"), rather than a toponym.

However, the three oldest translations of the Old Testament (The Septuagint, Theodotion and Symmachus) all transliterate the word "rosh" into the Greek in Ezekiel 38 and 39, thus treating it as a proper noun and suggesting they viewed this word as a toponym. Significantly, these same translations choose to translate and not transliterate the same Hebrew word into its Greek interpretations in other chapters (e.g. Ezekiel 40:1).

== S ==
=== Sabtah ===
Sabtah (סַבְתָּ֥ה) was a son of Cush according to Genesis 10:7, 1 Chronicles 1:9.

=== Sabtechah ===
Sabtechah (סַבְתְּכָ֑א) was a son of Cush according to Genesis 10:7, 1 Chronicles 1:9. In present map visualisations, Hebrew maps put Sabtechah in the Horn of Africa, and commonly associated in present day Somalia

=== Sachar ===
Two men called Sachar (sometimes spelled Sacar or Sakar) are mentioned in the Bible:

- One of David's heroes 1 Chronicles 11:35; also called Sharar 2 Samuel 23:33.
- A son of Obed-Edom the Gittite, and a temple porter 1 Chronicles 26:4.

=== Sachia ===
Sachia (also Sakia) (Hebrew:שָׂכְיָה) appears only in 1 Chronicles 8:10, where he is listed as one of the "sons" of Shaharaim and his wife Hodesh. The King James Version spells the name Shachia.

=== Salu ===
Salu (סָלוּא), of the house of Simeon, was the father of Zimri who was involved in the Heresy of Peor according to Numbers 25:14.

=== Saph ===
Saph (סַף) is a figure briefly mentioned in a section of 2 Samuel which discusses four yelide haraphah killed by Israelites. According to 2 Samuel 21:18, a war broke out between Israel and the Philistines. During the battle, Sibbecai the Hushathite, one of David's Mighty Warriors, killed Saph, who was one of the four. The expression yelide haraphah is rendered several different ways in translations of the Bible: "the descendants of Rapha" (NIV, NLT), "the descendants of the giants" (ESV, NLT), "the descendants of the giant" (NASB, Holman), and "the sons of the giant" (KJV, ASV). While most interpreters the phrase as a statement about the ancestry of the four people killed, describing them as descended from giants, another interpretation takes the phrase as meaning "votaries of Rapha," in reference to a deity by that name to which a group of warriors would have been associated.

=== Saraph ===
Saraph (Hebrew: שראף) was a descendant of Shelah, son of Judah. (1 Chronicles 4:21-23)

=== Sarsekim ===
Sarsekim, also spelled Sarsechim, is a name or title, or a portion of a name or title, which appears in Jeremiah 39:3. Jeremiah describes Babylonian officials, some named and the rest unnamed, who according to the text sat down "in the middle gate" of Jerusalem during its destruction in 587 or 586 BCE. The portion which explicitly gives the names and/or titles of the officials reads, in Hebrew, nrgl śr ʾṣr smgr nbw śr skym rb srys nrgl śr ʾṣr rb-mg. Various interpretations have divided the names in various ways. The King James Version, sticking closely to the grammatical indicators added to the text by the Masoretes during the Middle Ages, reads this as indicating six figures: "Nergalsharezer, Samgarnebo, Sarsechim, Rabsaris, Nergalsharezer, Rabmag". The New International Version sees three characters "Nergal-Sharezer of Samgar, Nebo-Sarsekim a chief officer, Nergal-Sharezer a high official." Versions featuring these three figures, with variations in the exact details of translations, include NLT and ESV. Four figures appear in the New American Standard Bible, "Nergal-sar-ezer, Samgar-nebu, Sar-sekim the Rab-saris, Nergal-sar-ezer the Rab-mag."

In 2007, a Babylonian Tablet was deciphered containing a reference to a "Nabu-sharussu-ukin," identified as referring to the biblical figure. See Nebo-Sarsekim Tablet.

=== Seba ===
Seba (סְבָא "drink thou") was a son of Cush according to Genesis 10:7, 1 Chronicles 1:9 The "tall men of Seba" (Good News Bible) are also referred to in Isaiah 45:14

=== Segub ===
There are two individuals called Segub (שְׂגוּב "exalted") mentioned in the Bible.

- The youngest son of Hiel the Beth-elite who rebuilt Jericho after 700 years of the Israelites destroying is mentioned in 1 Kings 16:34.
- One of the sons of Hezron through the daughter of Machir the son of Manasseh. He was also the father Jair and could possibly be Jair the judge of Israel, Segub also controlled twenty-three cities in Gilead. He is mentioned briefly in 1 Chronicles 2:21–22.

=== Seled ===
According to 1 Chronicles 2:1–30, in the genealogical section which begins the book of Chronicles, Seled (סֶלֶד "exultation"), who died childless, was the brother of Appaim and son of Nadab, the son of Shammai, the son of Onam, the son of Jerahmeel, the son of Hezron, the son of Perez, the son of Judah, the eponymous founder of the Tribe of Judah.

=== Semachiah ===
Semachiah (or Semakiah) (סְמַכְיָהוּ "YHWH has sustained") appears in 1 Chronicles 26:7, in a genealogical passage concerning gatekeepers of the Jerusalem Temple. Semachiah is described as a son of Shemaiah, a son of Obed-Edom.

=== Sered ===
Sered (סֶרֶד "fear") was a son of Zebulun according to Genesis 46:14 and Numbers 26:26. He was one of the 70 souls to migrate to Egypt with Jacob. According to the verse in Numbers, he was the eponymous forefather of the clan of Sardites.

=== Sethur ===
Sethur (סְתוּר "hidden"), the son of Michael of the house of Asher, was a scout sent to Canaan prior to the crossing of the Jordan River according to Numbers 13:13.

=== Shaaph ===
Shaaph (שַׁעַף) appears in the second chapter of 1 Chronicles. In one translation, these verses read as follows: "And the sons of Jahdai: Regem, and Jotham, and Geshan, and Pelet, and Ephah, and Shaaph. Maacah, Caleb's concubine, bore Sheber and Tirhanah. And [the wife of] Shaaph the father of Madmannah bore Sheva the father of Machbenah and the father of Gibea. And the daughter of Caleb was Achsah" (1 Chronicles 2:47–49).

The words [the wife of] do not occur in the Hebrew text, which reads literally, as Sara Japhet translates it, "And Shaaph the father of Madmannah bore Sheva . . ." but with a feminine form (watteled) of the verb "bore," rather than the expected masculine form wayyoled. Japhet outlines several possibilities as to how the text may originally have read.

=== Shaashgaz ===
Shaashgaz appears in the Hebrew Bible in Esther 2:14, where it is given as the name of the eunuch who was in charge of the "second house of the women".

=== Shabbethai ===
Shabbethai (שַׁבְּתַי), a Levite who helped Ezra in the matter of the foreign marriages (Ezra 10:15), probably the one present at Ezra's reading of the law (Nehemiah 8:7), and possibly the Levite chief and overseer (Nehemiah 11:16). The name might mean "one born on Sabbath", but more probably is a modification of the ethnic Zephathi (Zephathite), from Zarephathi (Zarephathite). Meshullam and Jozabad, with which Shabbethai's name is combined, both originate in ethnic names. (Encyclopaedia Biblica)

=== Shagee ===
Shagee (also spelled Shage or Shageh) (Hebrew:שָׁגֵה) is a figure who appears, indirectly, in one version of the list of David's Mighty Warriors.

In 1 Chronicles 11:34, a figure appears who is called "Jonathan the son of Shagee the Hararite." In 2 Samuel 23:32–33, the name "Jonathan" appears directly before the name "Shammah the Harodite", while in 2 Samuel 23:11 is found "Shammah the son of Agee the Hararite," who is the subject of a very brief story in which he fights with Philistines. The exact sort of copying error or deliberate abbreviation that may have led to this state of affairs is uncertain.

=== Shaharaim ===
Shaharaim (שַׁחֲרַיִם "double dawn") was a member of the house of Benjamin. He had three wives, Hushim, Baara, and Hodesh, and was the father of Jobab, Zibia, Mesha, Malcam, Jeuz, Sachiah, Mirmah, Abitub, and Elpaal according to 1 Chronicles 8:8–9.

=== Shamed ===
See Shemed.

=== Shamhuth ===
Shamhuth the Izrahite (Hebrew, Shamhut ha-Yizrah) is a figure mentioned in the list of military divisional captains in 1 Chronicles 27:8. The 27th chapter of 1 Chronicles gives the names of people who, according to the Chronicler, were in charge of 24,000-man divisions of David's military, each of which was on active duty for a month. Shamhuth was the commander for the fifth month of each year. Other Izrahites were mentioned in 1 Chronicles 26:29 in connection with duties outside Jerusalem.

=== Shamir ===
This is about the individual named Shamir. For the biblical place-name Shamir, see List of minor biblical places § Shamir.

Shamir (שָׁמוּר "guardian") appears in a list of Levite names in the time of David (1 Chronicles 24:24).

=== Shammah ===
See Shammah for several people by this name.

=== Shammai ===
Shammai (Hebrew: שִׁמִּי) was the name of at least 3 biblical individuals.

- One of the sons of Onam according to 1 Chronicles 2:28, he also had two sons: Nadab and Abishur, he was also the brother of Jada.
- A son of Rekem and the father of Maon, and a Jerahmeelite. (1 Chronicles 2:44–45)
- One of the children of Ezra in 1 Chronicles 4:17. He was also probably the same person as Shimon (q.v) ver. 20. The Septuagint suggest that Jether was the father of all three. Rabbi D. Kimchi speculates that the children in 1 Chronicles 4:17 were the children of Mered and his wife Bithiah, the daughter of Pharaoh.

=== Shammoth ===
According to 1 Chronicles 11:27, Shammoth the Harorite was one of David's Mighty Warriors. An entry in the corresponding list in Samuel contains Shammah the Harodite (2 Samuel 23:25). See Shammah.

=== Shammua ===
There are four individuals by the name of Shammua in the Hebrew Bible:

- Shammua, the son of Zaccur of the house of Reuben, was a scout sent to Canaan prior to the crossing of the Jordan River according to Numbers 13:4.
- One of the sons of David and Bathsheba, mentioned in 2 Samuel 5:14, 1 Chronicles 14:4 and 1 Chronicles 3:5.
- A Levite, son of Galal and father of Abda who lived in Jerusalem after the return from exile in the time of Nehemiah (11:17).
- A Levite in the time of Nehemiah (12:18).

=== Shamsherai ===
Shamsherai (שַׁמְשְׁרַי "sunlike") is mentioned once, in passing, in a long list of the "sons of Jeroham" within a genealogy of the Tribe of Benjamin (1 Chronicles 8:26).

=== Shapham ===
A figure named Shapham (שָׁפָם "bold") is mentioned in passing once in the Hebrew Bible, in a list of Gadites in the land of Bashan (1 Chronicles 5:12).

=== Shaphat ===
Shaphat, "Judge" (שָׁפָט), the son of Hori of the house of Simeon, was a scout sent to Canaan prior to the crossing of the Jordan River according to Numbers 13:5.

Also the name of one of King David's sons by Bathsheba.

=== Sharai ===
A Sharai (שָׁרַי "releaser") is mentioned once in the Bible, in passing, in a list of the "sons of Bani" with foreign wives (Ezra 10:40).

=== Sharar ===
A Sharar is mentioned indirectly in 2 Samuel 23:33, where "Ahiam the son of Sharar the Hararite" is listed as one of David's Mighty Warriors. In 1 Chronicles 11:35, the same figure is referred to as Sacar (sometimes spelled Sakar or Sachar).

=== Sharezer ===
Sharezer, according to 2 Kings 19:37 and Isaiah 37:38, was one of the two sons of Sennacherib. He and his brother Adrammelech killed their father as he worshipped in the temple of Nisroch.

=== Shashai ===
A Shashai (שָׁשַׁי "noble") is listed in the Book of Ezra as a man who married a foreign wife (Ezra 10:40).

=== Shashak ===
Shashak or Sashak (שָׁשַׁק "longing") was a member of Benjamin's dynasty, son of Beriah and father of Iphdeiah and Penuel, mentioned in 1 Chronicles 8:14 and 25.

=== Sheariah ===
Sheariah (שְׁעַרְיָה "valued by YHWH"), according to 1 Chronicles 8, was a descendant of King Saul, specifically one of the six sons of Azel (1 Chronicles 8:38), the son of Eleasah, the son of Raphah, the son of Binea, the son of Moza (v. 37), the son of Zimri, the son of Jehoaddah, the son of Ahaz (36), the son of Micah (35), the son of Merib-baal, the son of Jonathan (34), the son of Saul (33). He is also mentioned 1 Chronicles 9, which substantially repeats the same genealogy, except that chapter 9 reads Rephaiah instead of Raphah (v. 43) and Jadah instead of Jehoaddah (42).

=== Shearjashub ===
Shearjashub (שאר ישוב Šə'ār-yāšūḇ) is possibly the first-mentioned son of Isaiah according to Isaiah 7:3. His name means "the remnant shall return" and was prophetic, offering hope to the people of Israel that although they were going to be sent into exile, and their temple destroyed, God remained faithful and would deliver "a remnant" from Babylon and bring them back to their land.

However, Targum Pseudo-Jonathan, Rashi, and some modern translations interpret the phrase according to the Masoretic grammar of the Hebrew cantillation marks, which break the sentence into u-sh'ar, yashuv b'nekha, "And the remnant, of your sons which will return," viz. a phrase and not a proper noun. Pseudo-Jonathan reads "and the rest of thy disciples, who have not sinned, and who are turned away from sin," and Rashi, "The small remnant that will return to Me through you, and they are like your sons." The Brenton Septuagint Translation and Douay–Rheims Bible translate the phrase "and thy son Jasub who is left," following the Masoretic grammar but assuming that Jasub, "will return," is still a proper noun.

=== Sheconiah ===
Sheconiah was a descendant of David, father of Shemaiah, and son of Obadiah.

=== Shechem ===
Shechem was the name of two individuals mentioned in the Bible:

- A prince of Shechem who defiled Dinah according to Genesis 34
- A son of Manasseh according to Numbers 26:31, Joshua 17:2, and 1 Chronicles 7:19.

=== Shedeur ===
Shedeur (שְׁדֵיאוּר "darter of light") was a member of the house of Reuben according to Numbers 1:5. He was the father of Elizur.

=== Shelemiah ===
Shelemiah (Hebrew: שלמיהו) the son of Abdeel, along with two others, was commanded by king Jehoiakim to arrest Baruch the scribe and Jeremiah the prophet (Jeremiah 36:25).

=== Shelomi ===
Shelomi (שְׁלֹמִי "peaceful") was the father of Ahihud, a prince of the Tribe of Asher at the time of the division of the land of Canaan. (Num. 34:27).

=== Shelumiel ===
Shelumiel (Hebrew: שלמיאל) was a son of Zurishaddai, a prince of the tribe of Simeon and one of the leaders of the tribes of Israel, according to Numbers 1:6. Yiddish schlemiel, a term for a "hapless loser", is said to be derived from the name.

=== Shelomith ===
Shelomith was the name of 5 individuals in the Hebrew Bible.

- Shelomith bat Dibri was the daughter of Dibri of the house of Dan, according to Leviticus 24:11. She was married to an Egyptian and her son (unnamed) was stoned to death by the people of Israel for blasphemy, following Moses' issue of a ruling on the penalty to be applied for blasphemy.
- A daughter of Zerubbabel during the exile. (1 Chronicles 3:19) She has been identified with the owner of a seal reading "Belonging to Shelomith, maidservant of Elnathan the governor".
- A Levite and a chief of the sons of Izhar in the time of David's death. (1 Chronicles 23:18) Also called Shelomoth. (1 Chronicles 24:22–23)
- The youngest child of Rehoboam through Maachah, daughter of Absalom. It is uncertain whether they were a son or daughter. (2 Chronicles 11:20)
- Shelomith, with the son of Josiphiah returned from Babylon with Ezra with 80 male individuals. There appears, however, to be an omission, which may be supplied from the Sept., and the true reading is probably "Of the sons of Bani, Shelomith the son of Josiphiah." See also 1 Esdr. 8:36, where he is called "Assamoth son of Josaphias." See Keil, ad oc.

=== Shelomoth ===
Shelomoth was the name of 2 biblical individuals.

- A descendant of Eliezer the son of Moses, put in the duty of temple treasury under David. (1 Chronicles 26:28)
- The oldest son of Shimei, the chief of the Gershonites in the time of David mentioned in 1 Chronicles 23:9.
- See Shelomith

=== Shemaiah ===
See List of people in the Hebrew Bible called Shemaiah

=== Shemariah ===
Shemariah (שְׁמַרְיָה "kept by YHWH") is the name of four biblical figures.

In 1 Chronicles 12:5, Shemariah is a Benjamite, one of David's soldiers who joined him at Ziklag.

In 2 Chronicles 11:19, Shemariah is one of the sons of Rehoboam, spelled Shamariah in the King James Version.

In Ezra 10:32, Shemariah is one of the "sons of Harim," in a list of men who took foreign wives. Another Shemariah, one of the "descendants of Bani", appears in verse 41.

=== Shemeber ===
Shemeber (שֶׁמְאֵבֶר "lofty flight") is the king of Zeboiim in Genesis 14 who joins other Canaanite city kings in rebelling against Chedorlaomer.

=== Shemed ===
Shemed, spelled Shamed in the King James Version, is a figure briefly listed in 1 Chronicles 8:12 as one of the sons of Elpaal, the son of Shaharaim. He and his two brothers are referred to as "Eber, and Misham, and Shamed, who built Ono, and Lod, with the towns thereof" (1 Chronicles 8:12).

=== Shemer ===
Shemer (Hebrew: שמר Shemer "guardian") is the name of three biblical figures.

According to 1 Kings, Shemer was the name of the man from whom Omri, King of Israel, bought Samaria (Hebrew Shomron), which he named after Shemer.

According to 1 Chronicles, one of the Levites involved in the musical ministry of the Jerusalem temple was "Ethan the son of Kishi, the son of Abdi, the son of Malluch, the son of Hashabiah, the son of Amaziah, the son of Hilkiah, the son of Amzi, the son of Bani, the son of Shemer, the son of Mahli, the son of Mushi, the son of Merari, the son of Levi" (1 Chronicles 6:44–47). In this passage, the King James Version spells the name Shamer.

1 Chronicles 7:34 mentions a Shemer as one of the descendants of the Tribe of Asher. In verse 32, this figure is called Shomer, and is the son of Heber, the son of Beriah, the son of Asher.

=== Shemida ===
Shemida (שְׁמִידָע "wise") was a son of Manasseh according to Numbers 26:32, Joshua 17:2, and 1 Chronicles 7:19.

=== Shemiramoth ===
Shemiramoth (שְׁמִירָמוֹת "name of heights") was the name of 2 biblical individuals.

- One of the many Levite musicians who played on his harp to prepare the alamoth when King David moved the Ark of the Covenant from the land of Obed-edom to Jerusalem. (1 Chronicles 15:18,20 16:5)
- One of the Levite teachers sent by Jehoshaphat all across Judah teaching the Torah by YHWH according to 2 Chronicles 7:8.

=== Shemuel ===
Shemuel (שְׁמוּאֵל) Prince of the tribe of Simeon; one of those appointed by Moses to superintend the division of Canaan amongst the tribe (Num. 34:20).

=== Shenazar ===
Shenazar (Hebrew שֵׁנאִצִּר fiery tooth or splendid leader) was one of the six sons of King Jehoiachin during the time of the exile according to 1 Chronicles 3:18.

=== Shephatiah ===
Shephatiah (Hebrew שפטיה) is the name of at least nine Hebrew Bible men:

- Shephatiah the son of David and Abital, David's fifth son, according to 2 Samuel 3:4.
- Shephatiah the son of Mattan (Jeremiah 38:1) who was among the officers who denounced Jeremiah to king Zedekiah.
- A descendant of Haruph and a Benjaminite warrior of David in Ziklag according to 1 Chronicles 2:5.
- A son of Maakah and the phylarch of the Simeonites in the time of David. (1 Chronicles 27:16)
- The youngest of the sons of Jehoshaphat and one of the brothers killed by Joram in the process of being king. (2 Chronicles 21:2)
- The father of Amariah and the son of Mahalalel. He was the ancestor of Athaiah of the tribe of Judah. (Nehemiah 11:4)
- The son of Reuel and father of Meshullam the chieftain of the tribe of Benjamin during the exile. (1 Chronicles 9:5.
- An ancestor of 372 descendants of his who went with Zerubbabel from Babylon. (Ezra 2:4;Nehemiah 7:9) He is identical to the Shephatiah of Ezra 1:3,8 whose 80 descendants returned in the rule of Zebadiah and Ezra.
- One of Solomon's servants whose descendants also returned with Zerubbabel from Babylon to Israel. (Ezra 2:57;Nehemiah 7:59)

=== Shepho ===
Shepho (שְׁפוֹ "bold"), an Edomite, is one of the sons of Shobal son of Seir according to (Genesis 36:23).

=== Sheshai ===
Sheshai (שֵׁשַׁי "noble") was one of the descendants of Anak mentioned in Numbers 13:22. When the Israelites took possession of the land, Sheshai along with Talmai and Ahiman were driven out of the land. (Joshua 15:14; Judges 1:10)

=== Sheshan ===
Sheshan (שֵׁשָׁן) is the name of one, or possibly two, biblical characters mentioned in the first book of Chronicles:

- "The son of Ishi was Sheshan, and Sheshan's daughter was Ahlai ... Now Sheshan had no sons, only daughters. And Sheshan had an Egyptian servant whose name was Jarha. Sheshan gave his daughter to Jarha his servant as wife, and they had a child, Attai."

=== Shillem ===
Shillem (שִׁלֵּם "repaid") was a son of Naphtali according to Genesis 46:24 and Numbers 26:49. He was one of the 70 souls to migrate to Egypt with Jacob.

=== Shimea ===
Shimea is the name of 2 biblical individuals.

- A Merarite as the son of Uzziah, and also the father of Haggish. (1 Chronicles 6:30)
- The grandfather of Asaph the prophet or seer of the men who ministered with music before the tabernacle, the tent of meeting. He is the father of Asaph's father Berechiah. (1 Chronicles 6:39)

=== Shimeah ===
The name Shimeah is used for two figures in the Hebrew Bible.

- Shimeah or Shammah was a third son of Jesse, a brother of David (1 Samuel 16:9), and the father of Jonadab (2 Samuel 13:3).
- A figure named Mikloth is the father of Shimeah according to 1 Chronicles 8:32, which gives no further information about either of them but places them in a genealogy of the Tribe of Benjamin. In a parallel passage, 1 Chronicles 9:38 calls this son of Mikloth Shimeam, and presents Mikloth as a son of "Jehiel the father of Gibeon," making Mikloth a great-uncle of the Israelite king Saul.

=== Shimei ===
Shimei (Hebrew: שִׁמְעִי Šīmʿī) is the name of a number of persons referenced in the Hebrew Bible and Rabbinical literature.

- The second son of Gershon and grandson of Levi (Exodus 6:17; Numbers 3:18; 1 Chronicles 6:17). The family of the Shimeites, as a branch of the tribe of Levi, is mentioned in Numbers 3:18, 21; 1 Chronicles 23:7, 10, 11 ("Shimei" in verse 9 could be a scribal error); and in Zechariah 12:13. In the New Testament the name occurs in Luke 3:26, spelled Semei in the King James Version.
- Shimei ben Gera, a Benjamite of Bahurim, son of Gera, "a man of the family of the house of Saul" (2 Samuel 16:5–14, 19:16–23; 1 Kings 2:8–9, 36–46). He is mentioned as one of David's tormentors during his flight before Absalom, and as imploring and winning David's forgiveness when the latter returned. David, however, in his dying charge to Solomon, bade him avenge the insult (1 Kings 2:9). Jewish scribes say that Solomon's teacher was Shimei (son of Gera), and while he lived, he prevented Solomon from marrying foreign wives. The Talmud says at Ber. 8a: "For as long as Shimei the son of Gera was alive Solomon did not marry the daughter of Pharaoh" (see also Midrash Tehillim to Ps. 3:1). Solomon's execution of Shimei was his first descent into sin.
- A brother of David, called also Shammah, Shimeah, and Shimea (1 Samuel 16:9; 17:13; 2 Samuel 13:3; 21:21; 1 Chronicles 2:13; 20:7)
- A friend of King David mentioned in 1 Kings 1:8
- Son of Elah, one of Solomon's prefects, over the district of Benjamin (1 Kings 4:18)
- A grandson of Jeconiah and brother of Zerubbabel (1 Chronicles 3:19)
- A grandson of Simeon, who is described as the father of sixteen sons and six daughters, and whose clan dwelt in Judea (1 Chronicles 4:26, 27)
- A Reubenite Son of Gog, Father of Micah (1 Chronicles 5:4)
- Levites (1 Chronicles 6:29, 42; 25:17; 2 Chronicles 29:14; 31:12, 13)
- A Benjamite chief who had nine sons (1 Chronicles 8:21, R. V.; comp. ib. v. 13)
- "The Ramathite," one of David's officers (1 Chronicles 27:27)
- A Levite and other Israelites whom Ezra required to put away their foreign wives (Ezra 10:23, 33, 38)
- Grandfather of Mordecai (Esther 2:5).

=== Shimrath ===
Shimrath (שִׁמְרָת "guard") was a Benjaminite, as one of the nine sons of Shimei. (1 Chronicles 8:21)

=== Shimri ===
The name Shimri (שִׁמְרִי) appears 3 times in the Hebrew Bible

- A son of Shemaiah mentioned in the Book of 1 Chronicles
- Shimri the father of Jedaiel and the brother of Joha the Tizite.
- One of the two sons of Elizaphan according to 2 Chronicles 29:13.

=== Shimron ===
Shimron (שִׁמְרוֹן "watch-height") was the 4th son of Issachar and the progenitor of the clan of Shimronites according to Genesis 46:13, Numbers 26:24 and 1 Chronicles 7:1. He was one of the 70 people to migrate to Egypt with Jacob, a Guyanese and West Indies cricketer was named after him.

=== Shimshai ===
Shimshai (שִׁמְשַׁי "sunny") was a scribe for Rehum (the satrap of Judea for the Persian government) who was represented the peoples listed in Ezra 4:9–10 in a letter to King Artaxerxes.

=== Shinab ===
Shinab (שִׁנְאָב "splendor of the father") is the king of Admah in Genesis 14 who joins other Canaanite city kings in rebelling against Chedorlaomer.

=== Shiphi ===
Shiphi (שִׁפְעִי "abundant") was a Simeonite, the son of Allon and the father of Ziza in the time of King Hezekiah of Judah mentioned in 1 Chronicles 4:37.

=== Shiphtan ===
Shiphtan (שִׁפְטָן "judicial") was the father of Kemuel, a prince of the Tribe of Ephraim selected to divide the promised land between the tribes. (Num. 34:24).

=== Shisha ===
Shisha (Hebrew – שישא) was the father of Elihoreph and Ahijah, who were scribes of King Solomon (1 Kings 4:3).

=== Shobab ===
Shobab שובב "Mischievous" is the name of two figures in the Hebrew Bible.

- Shobab was one of the children born to King David after he took up residence in Jerusalem (2 Samuel 5:14), whose mother is named in 1 Chronicles 3:5 as Bathshua or Bathsheba, the daughter of Ammiel. In Brenton's Septuagint Translation, his name is translated as "Sobab" and his mother's name is given as "Bersabee". Each reference to him mentions him briefly, in a list along with at least three other sons of David born in Jerusalem (2 Samuel 5:14; 1 Chronicles 3:5, 14:4).
- Shobab is mentioned in 1 Chronicles 2:18 as one of the children of Caleb, son of Hezron (not to be confused with the more famous Caleb son of Jephunneh).

=== Shobal ===
Shobal (שׁוֹבָל) was a Horite chief in the hill country of Seir during the days of Esau. He was a son of Seir the Horite, and his sons were Alvas, Manahath, Ebal, Shepho and Onam. He is mentioned in Genesis 36:20–29.

=== Shuni ===
Shuni (שׁוּנִי "fortunate") was a son of Gad and progenitor of the clan of Shunites according to Genesis 46:16 and Numbers 26:15. He was one of the 70 persons to migrate to Egypt with Jacob.

=== Shuthelah ===
Shuthelah (Hebrew: שׁוּתֶלַח, romanized: /ˌʃuːˈtæˌlɑːx/ shoo-TELL-ahkh) was a son of Ephraim and father of Eran, according to Numbers 26:35 and 1 Chronicles 7:20.

=== Sisamai ===
Sisamai (סִסְמַי "water crane" or "swallow") was the son of Eleasah and the father of Shallum mentioned in 1 Chronicles 2:40. He was a descendant of Sheshan in the line of Jerahmeel.

=== Sodi ===
Sodi (סוֹדִי "acquaintance") of the house of Zebulun was the father of Gaddiel, a scout sent to Canaan prior to the crossing of the Jordan River according to Numbers 13:10.

=== Sotai ===
Sotai (סוֹטַי) was a descendant of the servants of Solomon, and his own descendants were listed among those who returned from the Babylonian exile in Ezra 2:55.

=== Susi ===
Susi (סוּסִי "my horse") of the house of Manasseh was the father of Gaddi, a scout sent to Canaan prior to the crossing of the Jordan River according to Numbers 13:11.

== T ==
=== Tahan ===
Tahan (Hebrew: תַּחַן "camp") was a son of Ephraim according to Numbers 26:35 and 1 Chronicles 7:25.

=== Tahash ===
Tahash (Hebrew: תַּחַשׁ) was the third son of Nahor and his concubine Reumah; a nephew of Abraham, he is only mentioned in one verse in the Bible which is Genesis 22:24.

=== Tahath ===
There are 3 people named Tahath in the Hebrew Bible.

- Tahath a descendant of Korah and an ancestor of Samuel according to 1 Chronicles 6:37
- Tahath the son of Bered, and the father of Eleadah, also a descendant of Ephraim, and Tahath the son of Eleadah according to 1 Chronicles 7:20.

=== Taphath ===
Taphath (Hebrew טפת, "Drop") was a daughter of Solomon and wife of one of her father's twelve regional administrators, the son of Abinadab (First Kings 4:11).

=== Tappuah ===
Tappuah (Hebrew: תַּפּוּחַ), one of the four sons of Hebron. Mentioned in 1 Chronicles 2:43.

=== Tebah ===
Tebah (Hebrew: טבח, "Massacre") was the first son of Nahor and his concubine Reumah. He is mentioned in Genesis 22:24.

=== Tekoa ===
Tekoa or Tekoah (Hebrew: תְּקוֹעַ, Modern: Teku'a, Tiberian: Tekû'a) was the son of Ashhur the son of Hezron through an unnamed mother mentioned in 1 Chronicles 2:24, 4:5. The name Tekoah is also the name of a place which the Prophet Amos was born.

=== Temeni ===
Temeni (Hebrew: תֵּימְנִי "southern") is described in the Bible as a son of Naarah and Ashhur the son of Hezron the Grandson of Judah the founder of the tribe. He was the brother of Haahashtari, Ahuzam, and Hepher according to 1 Chronicles 4:6.

=== Timna ===
Timna was the daughter of Seir the Horite, and concubine of Eliphaz, a son of Esau, and the mother of Amalek. In the context of listing the Horite chiefs from before the Edomite conquest, Genesis 36:20-22 names her as a sister of Lotan, the eldest of Seir's sons. Robert Payne Smith suggests that this Timna is not to be identified with the concubine of Esau's son Eliphaz because they are separated "by four generations".

=== Tirhanah ===
Tirhanah (Hebrew: תִּרְחֲנָה) according to the Biblical Narrative was the son of Caleb the son of Hezron. He was the son of Caleb's concubine named Maachah, and also the brother of Shaaph and Sheber. (1 Chronicles 2:48)

=== Tola ===
Tola (Hebrew: תּוֹלָע, Modern: Tola', Tiberian: Tôlā') was the name of two individuals mentioned in the Bible:

- A son of Issachar according to Genesis 46:13, Numbers 26:23 and 1 Chronicles 7:1. He was one of the 70 souls to migrate to Egypt with Jacob.
- Tola (biblical figure), also of the tribe of Issachar, one of the judges of Israel (Judges 10:1–2).

== U ==
=== Uel ===
Uel (Hebrew: אוּאֵל "wish or will of God") was a Judean who had taken a foreign woman during the exile. Mentioned in Ezra 10:34 : "Of the sons of Bani; Maadai, Amram, and Uel."

=== Ulam ===
Ulam (Hebrew: אוּלָם) is a name that appears twice in the Hebrew Bible.

- In 1 Chronicles 7:16–17, an Ulam appears in a genealogical passage as the son of Peresh, the son of Machir, the son of the patriarch Manasseh.
- In 1 Chronicles 8:39, an Ulam appears in a genealogy of Saul's family as the son of Eshek, the brother of Azel, the son of Eleasah, the son of Raphah, the son of Binea, the son of Moza, the son of Zimri, the son of Jehoadah, the son of Ahaz, the son of Micah, the son of Meribbaal.

=== Uri ===
Uri is mentioned 7 times, 6 of which indicate that another figure is the "son of Uri". The meaning of the name in English is "my light", "my flame" or "illumination".

- Uri (Hebrew: אוּרִי) is mentioned in Exodus 31 and 1 Chronicles 2 as a member of the Tribe of Judah. He is the son of Hur (Hebrew: חור) and the father of Bezalel (Hebrew: בצלאל).
- Another Uri (Hebrew: אוּרִי) is mentioned in Ezra 10 as one of those who have taken "strange wives."

=== Uriel ===
- Uriel or Zephaniah the son of Tahath according to 1 Chronicles 6:24.
- Uriel a Archangel

=== Urijah son of Shemaiah ===
Urijah, son of Shemaiah (Hebrew: אוּרִיָּהוּ בֵּנ–שְׁמַעְיָהוּ ʾŪrīyyāhū ben-Šəmaʿyāhū) was a minor prophet mentioned in Jeremiah 26:20-23. He was from Kiriath-Jearim, and his prophecies often matched Jeremiah's criticisms. When Jehoiakim heard the reports of these prophecies, he sent to have him killed, but Urijah fled to Egypt. In response, Jehoiakim sent a group of men, including Elnathan son of Achbor – the future father-in-law to his son, Jeconiah – to bring him back. After being brought before the king, he was executed, and buried in a potter's field.

=== Urijah ===
Urijah (Hebrew: אוריה uriyah) a priest in the time of King Ahaz of Judah, built an altar at the temple in Jerusalem on the Damascene model for Tiglathpileser, king of Assyria. 2 Kings 16:10–16

=== Uz ===
Uz was the name of 3 characters in the Bible:

- The firstborn son of Nahor and first son of Nahor and Milcah mentioned briefly in Genesis 22:20–21.
- The son of Aram the son of Shem mentioned in Genesis 10:23.
- One of the two sons of Dishan, his brothers name was Aran he is mentioned in Genesis 36:28 and 1 Chronicles 1:42.

== V ==
=== Vaizatha ===
Vaizatha (or Vajezatha; Hebrew: וַיְזָתָא) is one of the ten sons of Persian vizier Haman, mentioned in Esther 9:9. Haman had planned to kill all the Jews living under the reign of King Ahasuerus, but his plot was foiled. In their defence, the Jews killed 500 men in the citadel of Susa, as well as Vaizatha and his nine brothers: this event is remembered in the Jewish festival Purim. Walther Hinz has proposed that the name is a rendering of an Old Iranian name, Vahyazzāta, which itself is derived from Vahyaz-dāta ("given from the best one"), as found in Aramaic, Elamite, and Akkadian sources.

=== Vaniah ===
Vaniah, meaning nourishment, or weapons, of the Lord; one of many sons of Bani named in Ezra 10:36.

=== Vophsi ===
Vophsi (וׇפְסִי "rich") of the house of Naphtali was the father of Nahbi, a scout sent to Canaan prior to the crossing of the Jordan River according to Numbers 13:14.

== Y ==
=== Yair ===
Yair (Hebrew: יָאִיר Yā’īr, "he enlightens") was a man from Gilead (Numbers 32:39-41, 1 Chronicles 2:21-23).

== Z ==
=== Zaavan ===
Zaavan (זַעֲוָן za'-a-van or za'-awan), son of Ezer, was a Horite chief in the Land of Edom. (Gen. 36:27, 1 Chr. 1:42)

=== Zabad ===
Zabad (Hebrew: זָבָד) is the name of seven men in the Hebrew Bible.

- In 1 Chronicles 2:36–37, Zabad is a member of the Tribe of Judah, the family of Hezron and the house of Jahahmeel. He was the son of Nathan and the father of Ephlal.
- In 1 Chronicles 7:21, Zabad is an Ephraimite of the family of Shuthelah. He was the son of Tanath and the father of Suthelah.
- In 1 Chronicles 11:41, Zabad is one of King David's mighty men. He is the son of Ahlai.
- In 2 Chronicles 24:26, Zabad is one of two servants of King Joash who kill him in his bed. He is the son of Shimeath, an Amonite woman. In 2 Kings 12:21 this same man seems to be called Jozachar (Hebrew: יוֹזָכָר; Latin: Josachar). His fellow conspirator is Jehozabad (Hebrew: יהוֹזָבָד; Latin: Jozabad), the son of Shomer (Hebrew: שֹׁמֵר; Latin: Somer).
- In Ezra 10:27,33,34, three men named Zabad are listed as having taken foreign wives, whom Ezra persuades them to send away.

=== Zabbai ===
Zabbai (זַבַּי) was the father of Baruch, one of Nehemiah's helpers in repairing the walls of Jerusalem, according to Nehemiah 3:20.

=== Zabdi ===
Zabdi (זַבְדִּי), son of Zerah, of the Tribe of Judah, was the father of Carmi and the grandfather of Achan, according to Joshua 7:1. He was present at the Battle of Jericho.

=== Zabud ===
Zabud (Hebrew – זבוד, zābud, meaning "endowed".) was a priest and friend of King Solomon, according to 1 Kings 4:5. He is described as the "son of Nathan", but it is unclear whether this is Nathan the prophet or Nathan the son of David. As a "friend" of the king, he probably served the function of a counselor.

=== Zaccur ===
Zaccur (זַכּוּר) of the house of Reuben was the father of Shammua, a scout sent to Canaan prior to the crossing of the Jordan River according to Numbers 13:4.

=== Zalmon ===
Zalmon the Ahohite, according to 2 Samuel 23:28 in the Masoretic Text, is listed as one of David's Mighty Warriors. In the Masoretic Text of 1 Chronicles 11:29, in another copy of the same list of warriors, he is called "Ilai the Ahohite." Where the Masoretic Text has "Zalmon," various manuscripts of the Greek Septuagint have Ellon, Sellom, or Eliman. And where the Masoretic Text has "Ilai," the Septuagint reads Elei, Eli, or Ela.

=== Zaza ===
Zaza (זָזָא "brightness" or "fullness") was one of the sons of Jonathan, descendant of Jerahmeel mentioned in (1 Chronicles 2:33); he was also the brother of Peleth and the grandson of Jada.

=== Zebadiah ===
Zebadiah (cf. Zebedee) (Hebrew:זְבַדְיָה) may refer to:

- A son of Asahel, Joab's brother (1 Chronicles 27:7).
- A Levite who took part as one of the teachers in the system of national education instituted by Jehoshaphat (2 Chronicles 17:7–8).
- The son of Ishmael, "the ruler of the house of Judah in all the king's matters" (2 Chronicles 19:8–11).
- A son of Beriah (1 Chronicles 8:15).
- A Korhite porter of the Lord's house (1 Chronicles 26:2). Three or four others of this name are also mentioned.

=== Zebudah ===
Zebudah (זְבִידָה "given") was the first wife of King Josiah; they had a son, Jehoiakim. She is mentioned in these passages: 2 Kings 23:36. She was the daughter of Pedaiah of Rumah.

=== Zechariah ===
Zechariah was the name of 18 minor biblical individuals.

In addition to the characters named above, there are numerous minor characters in the Bible with the same name:

- A prophet, who had "understanding in the seeing of God," in the time of Uzziah, who was much indebted to him for his wise counsel: 2 Chron 26:5.
- One of the chiefs of the tribe of Reuben: 1 Chron 5:7.
- One of the porters of the tabernacle: 1 Chron 9:21.
- 1 Chron 9:37.
- A Levite who assisted at the bringing up of the ark from the house of Obed-edom: 1 Chron 15:20–24.
- A Kohathite Levite: 1 Chron 24:25.
- A Merarite Levite: 1 Chron 27:21.
- The father of Iddo: 1 Chron 27:21.
- One who assisted in teaching the law to the people in the time of Jehoshaphat: 2 Chron 17:7.
- A Levite of the sons of Asaph: 2 Chron 20:14.
- One of Jehoshaphat's sons: 2 Chron 21:2.
- The father of Abijah (queen), who was the mother of Hezekiah: 2 Chron 29:1 possibly the same as Isaiah's supporter Zechariah the son of Jeberechiah Isa 8:2.
- One of the sons of Asaph: 2 Chron 29:13.
- One of the "rulers of the house of God": 2 Chron 35:8.
- A chief of the people in the time of Ezra, who consulted him about the return from captivity in Ezra 8:16; probably the same as mentioned in Neh 8:4.
- Neh 11:12.
- Neh 12:16.
- Neh 12:35–41.

=== Zedekiah ===
(Hebrew צִדְקִיָּה tsidqiyah)

- Zedekiah, King of Judah
- Zedekiah, son of Chenaanah, a false prophet in the time of Kings Jehoshaphat and Ahab
- Zedekiah, son of Maaseiah, who, according to Jeremiah 29:21, was a false prophet in Babylon.
- Zedekiah the son of Hananiah, one of the princes to whom Michaiah told of Jeremiah's prophecy – Jeremiah 36:12. A seal was found of "Zedekiah son of Hanani", identification is likely, but uncertain.
- Zedekiah the son of King Jehoiachin according to 1 Chronicles 3:16. Not to be confused with his granduncle King Zedekiah.
- Zedekiah, a priest who sealed the covenant with Nehemiah (Nehemiah 10:2)

=== Zephaniah ===
Zephaniah (Hebrew צפניה, pronounced TsePhNiYaH) was the name of at least three people in the Bible:

- Zephaniah the prophet (q.v.)
- Zephaniah the son of Maaseiah the priest in Jeremiah 29:25. A member of the deputation sent by King Zedekiah to Jeremiah (Jeremiah 21:1; 37:3). "He is probably the same Zephaniah who is called 'the second priest' in 52:24 ... and was among those executed after the capture of Jerusalem in 587 B.C. In the present situation he is overseer of the temple (vs. 26), occupying the position which had been held earlier by Pashur, who had put Jeremiah in stocks..."
- Zephaniah, also called Uriel, was the son of Tahath and the father of Uzziah or Azariah according to 1 Chronicles 6:24.

=== Zephon ===
See Ziphion.

=== Zerah ===
See Zohar.

=== Zerahiah ===
Zerahiah (זְרַחְיָה) was a High Priest and an ancestor of Zadok, he was the son of Uzzi and the father of Meraioth. He is mentioned in (1 Chronicles 6:6, 1 Chronicles 6:51; Ezra 7:4)

=== Zeri ===
See Izri.

=== Zeror ===
Zeror (צְרוֹר), son of Bechorath, of the tribe of Benjamin, was the great-grandfather of King Saul and of his commander Abner. According to Saul, his family was the least of the tribe of Benjamin. (1 Samuel 9)

=== Zichri ===
Zichri (זִכְרִי) was a son of Izhar of the house of Levi according to Exodus 6:21, born in Egypt. He was a nephew of Amram and a cousin of Aaron, Miriam, and Moses. Zichri was also the name of the father of Amasiah, one of Jehoshaphat's commanders according to 2 Chron 17:16.

=== Zidkijah ===
Zidkijah is mentioned in chapter 10 of Nehemiah.

=== Zillah ===
In Genesis 4:19, 22–23, Zillah (Hebrew: צִלָּה – Ṣillāh) is a wife of Lamech and the mother of Tubal-cain and Naamah.

=== Ziphah ===
In 1 Chronicles 4:16, Ziphah (zī'fe) is mentioned as a son of Jehaleleel, a descendant of Judah, and brother of Ziph.

=== Zippor ===
Zippor (צִפּוֹר "sparrow") was the father of Balak, the king of Moab at the time of the exodus, in Numbers 22. He was a descendant of Moab, the son of Lot.

=== Ziphion ===
Ziphion or Zephon is a son of Gad (Genesis 46:16), and was the progenitor of the Zephonites (Numbers 26:15). There may be a connection with the angel Zephon.

=== Zithri ===
In Exodus 6:22, Zithri ("the Lord protects"), a Levite, was the son of Uzziel.

=== Ziza ===
Ziza (or Zizah) was the name of 3 biblical individuals:

- A Gershonite, the second son of Shimei (1 Chronicles 23:10–11). The spelling is according to the Septuagint; most Hebrew manuscripts have Zina.
- The son of Shiphi mentioned in 1 Chronicles 4:37.
- A son of King Rehoboam and Maacah the daughter of Avishalom mentioned in 2 Chronicles 11:20.

=== Zobebah ===
Zobebah (also known as Hazzobebah) (צֹבֵבָה "the slow") was a son of Koz of the tribe of Judah (1 Chronicles 4:8).

=== Zohar ===
One Zohar is named in Genesis 23:8 as the father of Ephron, the owner of the field where Abraham bought a cave for the burial of his wife Sarah.

Another Zohar or Zerah was a son of Simeon according to Genesis 46:10, Exodus 6:15, and Numbers 26:13. He was one of the 70 souls who migrated to Egypt with Jacob.

=== Zoheth ===
Zoheth (Hebrew:זוֹחֵת "releasing") was a son of Ishi of the tribe of Judah (1 Chronicles 4:20).

=== Zuar ===
Zuar (צוּעָר "littleness") was a member of the house of Issachar according to Numbers 1:8. He was the father of Nethaneel, the chief of the tribe at the time of the exodus and an assistant of Moses.

=== Zuph ===
Zuph or Zophai (צוּף "honeycomb") was an Ephraimite and an ancestor of Samuel, he was the father of Tohu or Toah according to (1 Samuel 1:1). He was the son of Elkanah (different from Elkanah the father of Samuel) according to (1 Chronicles 6:35). He is listed as being an Ephraimite even though he came from the line of Levi.

=== Zuriel ===
Zuriel ("My Rock is God") was the son of Abihail (Numbers 3:35). A Levite, Zuriel was chief prince of the Merarites at the time of the Exodus.

=== Zurishaddai ===
In Numbers 1:6, Rock of the Almighty ("Shaddai is my rock") was the father of Shelumiel, the prince of the Tribe of Simeon. He is mentioned in this context five times in the Book of Numbers.

== See also ==
- List of biblical names
- List of burial places of biblical figures
- List of major biblical figures
- List of minor biblical tribes
- List of minor biblical places
