= Zephon =

Zephon or Ziphion may refer to:

== In the Bible ==
- Zephon (angel), in Genesis 36:11 and Milton's Paradise Lost
- Ziphion (biblical figure), son of Gad in Genesis 46:16

== Gaming ==
- Zephon, a Legacy of Kain: Soul Reaver character
- Zephon, a 2025 sequel to Warhammer 40,000: Gladius – Relics of War

== See also ==
- Zepho, son of Eliphaz, also in Genesis
