= Palti =

Palti may refer to:

- Palti, son of Laish, a biblical figure associated with David's wife Michal
- Palti, son of Raphu, a minor biblical figure in the Book of Numbers
