= Haman =

Villain in the Book of Esther

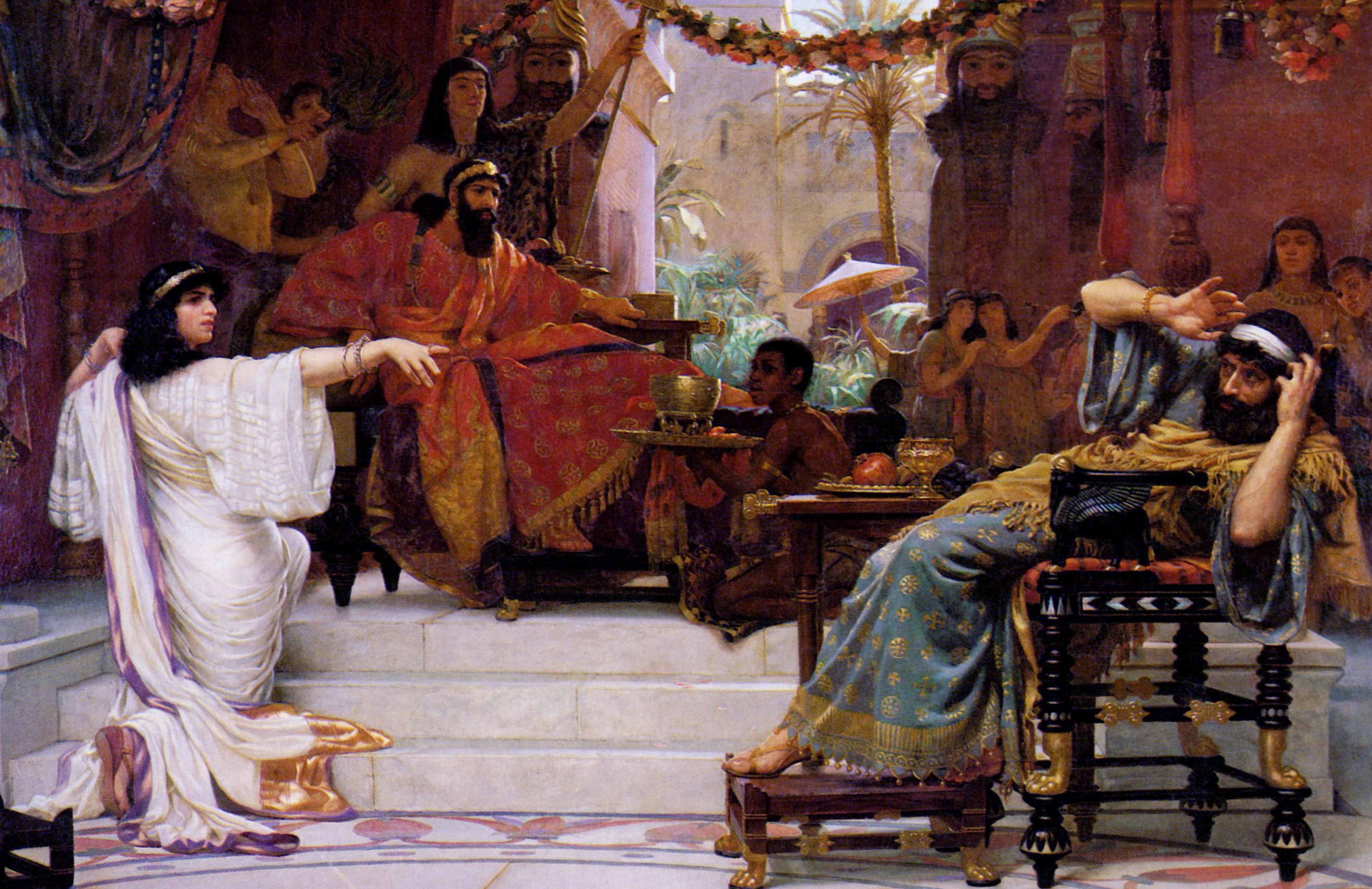
Esther Denouncing Haman (1888) by Ernest Normand

Haman (Hebrew: הָמָן Hāmān; also known as Haman the Agagite) is the main antagonist in the Book of Esther, who according to the Hebrew Bible was an official in the court of the Persian empire under King Ahasuerus, commonly identified as Xerxes I (died 465 BCE) but traditionally equated with Artaxerxes I or Artaxerxes II. His epithet, Agagite, indicates that Haman was a descendant of Agag, the king of the Amalekites. Some commentators interpret this descent to be symbolic, due to his similar personality.

In the narrative of the Book of Esther, Haman was a proud and ambitious man who demanded that everyone bow down to him as a sign of respect. However, a Jewish man named Mordecai refused to bow down to him, which enraged Haman. Seeking revenge, Haman convinced the king to issue a decree that all Jews in the Persian empire be exterminated. Haman's plot was foiled by Queen Esther, who was also Jewish and had concealed her identity from the King. Esther revealed Haman's plan to Ahasuerus and pleaded with him to spare her people. The King was outraged at Haman's treachery and ordered that he be executed instead.

== Etymology and meaning of the name ==
Some scholars equate Haman with Omanus, a theonym recorded by Strabo. Several etymologies have been proposed for Haman: it has been associated with the Persian word Humāyūn, meaning "illustrious" (naming dictionaries typically list it as meaning "magnificent"); with the sacred drink Haoma; or with the Persian name Vohuman, meaning "good thoughts". The 19th-century Bible critic Jensen associated it with the Elamite god Humban, a view dismissed by later scholars. Ahriman, a Zoroastrian spirit of destruction, has also been proposed as an etymon. Hoschander suggests that Haman is a priestly title and not a proper name.

== Haman in the Hebrew Bible ==
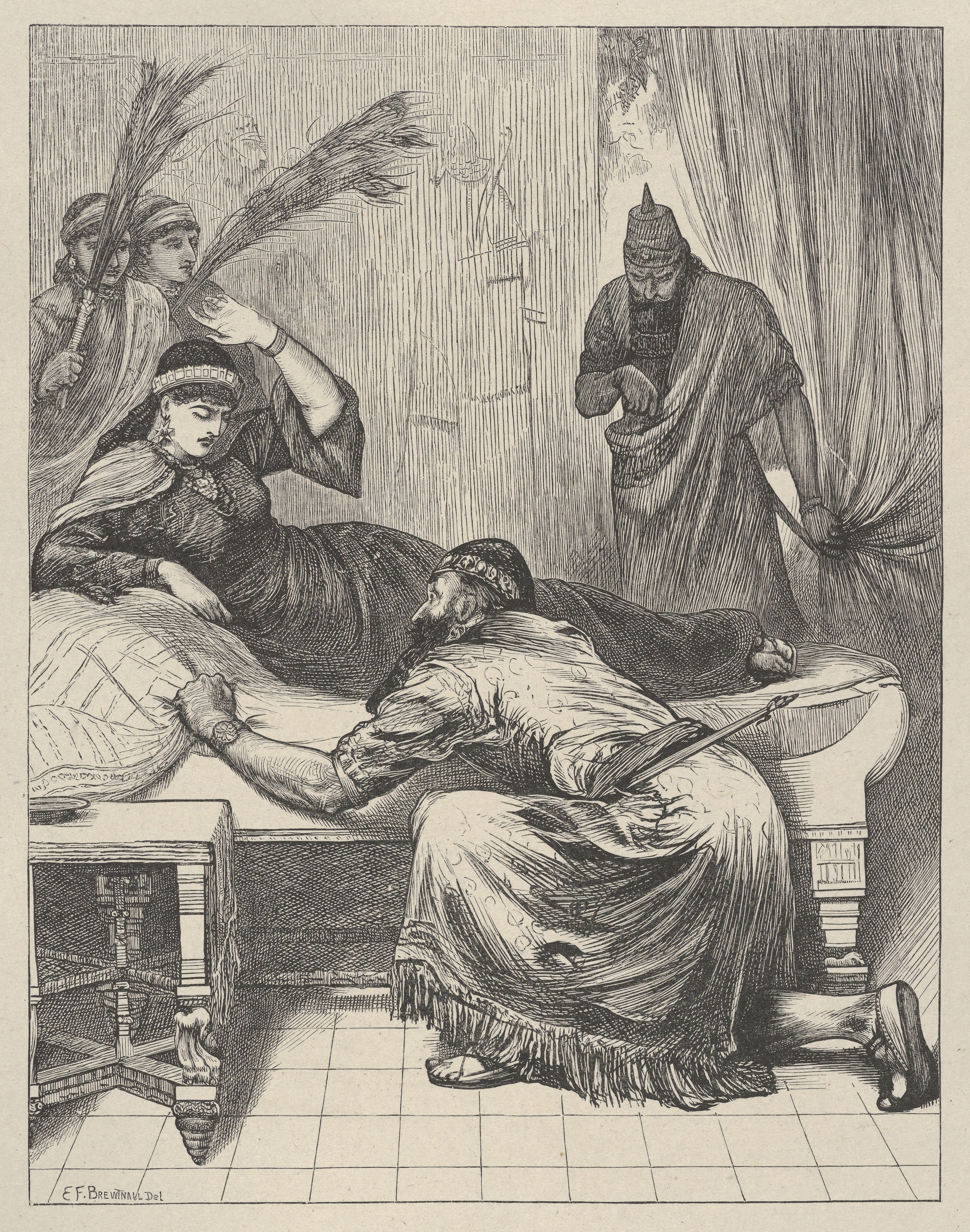
Esther denouncing Haman

As described in the Book of Esther, Haman was the son of Hammedatha the Agagite. After Haman was appointed the principal minister of the king Ahasuerus, all of the king's servants were required to bow down to Haman, but Mordecai refused to. Angered by this, and knowing of Mordecai's Jewish nationality, Haman convinced Ahasuerus to allow him to have all of the Jews in the Persian empire killed.

The plot was foiled by Queen Esther, the king's recent wife, who was herself a Jew. Esther invited Haman and the king to two banquets. In the second banquet, she informed the king that Haman was plotting to kill her (and the other Jews). This enraged the king, who was further angered when (after leaving the room briefly and returning) he discovered Haman had fallen on Esther's couch, intending to beg mercy from Esther, but which the king interpreted as a sexual advance.

On the king's orders, Haman was hanged from the 50-cubit-high gallows that had originally been built by Haman himself, on the advice of his wife Zeresh, in order to hang Mordecai. The bodies of Haman's 10 sons were also hanged, after they died in battle against the Jews. The Jews also killed about 75,000 of their enemies in self-defense.

The apparent purpose of these unusually high gallows can be understood from the geography of Shushan: Haman's house (where the pole was located) was likely in the city of Susa (a flat area), while the royal citadel and palace were located on a mound about 15 meters higher than the city. Such a tall pole would have allowed Haman to observe Mordecai's corpse while dining in the royal palace, had his plans worked as intended.

== Haman in other sources ==
=== Midrash ===
According to Ḥanan b. Rava, his mother was ʾĂmatlaʾy, a descendant of ʿÔrebtî (also ʿÔrǝbtāʾ she-raven), apparently patriarch of a major Nehardean house.

TgEsth1 and TgEsth3 call him "Haman the son of Hamedatha, descended from Agag the son of Amaleq." The Targum Sheni gives Haman's lineage as follows: "Haman the son of Hammedatha the Agagite, son of Khada, (Note: also 'Ada) son of Kuza, (Note: also Bizna'i) son of Alipilot, (Note: also Aphlitus) son of Dios, son of Diosos, (Note: variants Djosim and Djosef) son of Peros, son of Ma'dan, (Note: also Hamdan) son of Bala'qan, (Note: also Talyon) son of Antimiros, (Note: also Atnisomos) son of Hadrus, (Note: also son of Harum, son of Harsum) son of Shegar, son of Negar, (Note: also Genar) son of Parmashta, son of Vaizatha, son of Agag, son of Sumqar, son of Amalek, son of a concubine of Eliphaz the son of Esau". There are apparently several generations omitted between Agag, who was executed by Samuel the prophet in the time of King Saul, and Amalek, who lived several hundred years earlier. According to the Midrash Abba Gorion, Haman was also called Memucan, because he was "destined for punishment".

In Rabbinic tradition, Haman is considered to be an archetype of evil and persecutor of the Jews. Having attempted to exterminate the Jews of Persia, and rendering himself thereby their worst enemy, Haman naturally became the center of many Talmudic legends. Being at one time extremely poor, he sold himself as a slave to Mordecai. He was a barber at Kefar Karzum for the space of twenty-two years. Haman had an idolatrous image embroidered on his garments, so that those who bowed to him at command of the king bowed also to the image.

Haman was also an astrologer, and when he was about to fix the time for the genocide of the Jews he first cast lots to ascertain which was the most auspicious day of the week for that purpose. Each day, however, proved to be under some influence favorable to the Jews. He then sought to fix the month, but found that the same was true of each month; thus, Nisan was favorable to the Jews because of the Passover sacrifice; Iyyar, because of the small Passover. But when he arrived at Adar he found that its zodiacal sign was Pisces, and he said, "Now I shall be able to swallow them as fish which swallow one another" (Esther Rabbah 7; Targum Sheni 3).

Haman had 365 counselors, but the advice of none was so good as that of his wife, Zeresh. She induced Haman to build a gallows for Mordecai, assuring him that this was the only way in which he would be able to prevail over his enemy, for hitherto the just had always been rescued from every other kind of death. As God foresaw that Haman himself would be hanged on the gallows, he asked which tree would volunteer to serve as the instrument of death. Each tree, declaring that it was used for some holy purpose, objected to being soiled by the unclean body of Haman. Only the thorn-tree could find no excuse, and therefore offered itself for a gallows (Esther Rabbah 9; Midrash Abba Gorion 7 (ed. Buber, Wilna, 1886); in Targum Sheni this is narrated somewhat differently).

According to the Targum Sheni, he killed the prophet Daniel, who managed to live to Ahasuerus's reign (Targum Sheini on Esther, 4, 11).

=== Quran ===
In the Qur'an (Islam's primary scripture), Haman (Arabic: هامان, romanized: Hāmān) is a person mentioned and associated with pharaoh of the Exodus. McAuliffe's Encyclopaedia of the Qurʾān among other sources relates "Haman" to be the Arabized form of "Ha-Amana" in Egyptian. Muhammad Asad contended that Haman is Ha-Amen as shortcut of the first few letters of title of High Priest of Amun in his book "The Message of The Qur'an". However, some scholars disagree with the theory of the Quranic Haman being an Egyptian title, instead of a name and the biblical figure himself.

Haman appears six times throughout the Qur'an four times with Pharaoh and twice by himself, where God sent Moses to invite Pharaoh, Haman, and their people to monotheism, and to seek protection of the Israelites whom Haman and Pharaoh were tormenting. Referring to Moses as a sorcerer and a liar, the Pharaoh rejected Moses' call to worship the God of Moses and refused to free the Israelite children. The Pharaoh commissioned Haman to build a tall tower using burnt bricks so that the Pharaoh could ascend and see the God of Moses. The Pharaoh, Haman, and their army in chariots pursuing Israel's fleeing children drowned in the Red Sea as the parted water closed on them. The Pharaoh's submission to God at the moment of death and total destruction was rejected, but his corpse was saved as a lesson for posterity and he was mummified.

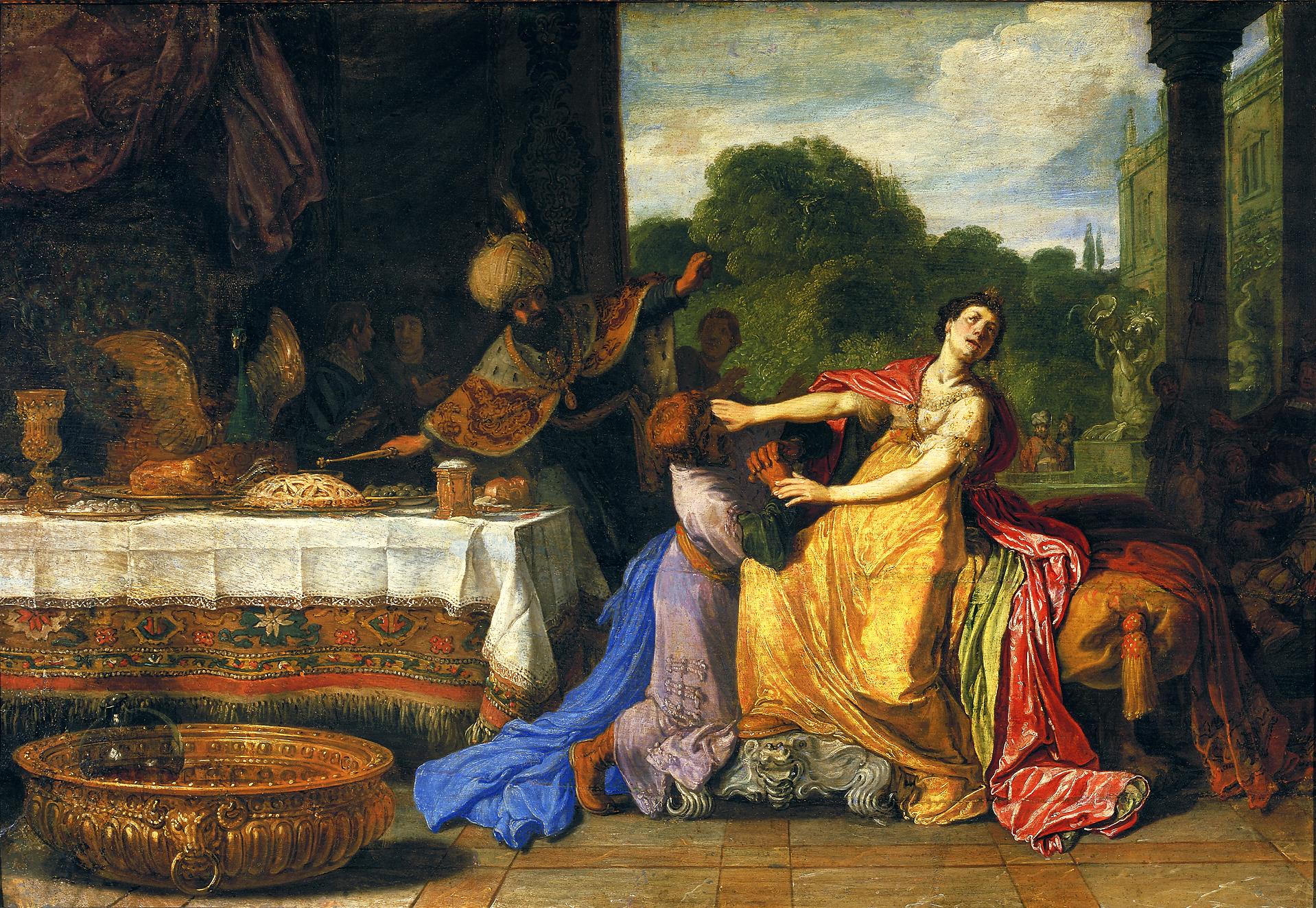
Haman Begging the Mercy of Esther, by Pieter Lastman

=== Josephus ===
Josephus mentions Haman in his Antiquities of the Jews. Josephus's account of the story draws from the Septuagint translation of the Book of Esther and from other Greek and Jewish sources, some no longer extant.

=== Septuagint ===
The version of the Book of Esther in the Septuagint portrays Haman in a distinct manner:

- Haman is referred to as a "Macedonian" and described as "an alien" to Persia. This characterization presents him as an outsider and not a true Persian.
- Haman is accused of plotting to transfer the sovereignty of Persia to the Macedonians, while the Jews are called "loyal Persians" by the king. This portrays Haman as disloyal and conspiring against Persia.
- In various passages, Haman is referred to as an "Agagite" (Amalekite), "Gogite" (from the cursed city of Gog), "Ebugaios" (an unexplained term), and "Bugaean". These labels serve to further mark Haman as a foreigner and enemy.
- The text suggests that Haman represents the Biblical Amalekites, the epitome of evil that God commands to be destroyed. Haman thus symbolizes the evil that the Jews must struggle against in every generation until the final eschatological triumph of God's kingdom.

=== Vulgate ===
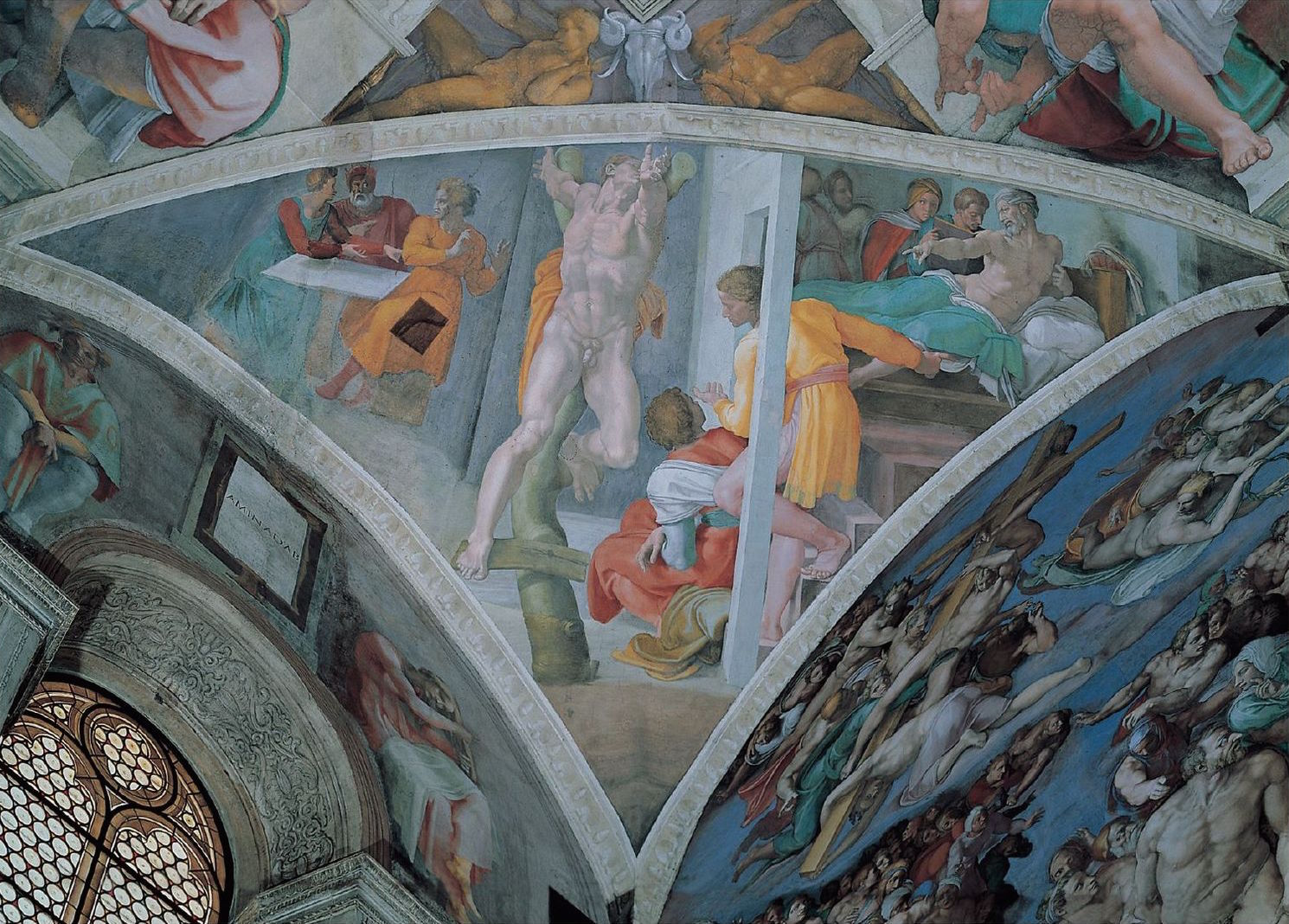
Crucifixion of Haman by Michelangelo, Sistine Chapel

As in the Septuagint, Haman's execution is ambiguous, suggestive of both hanging and crucifixion. The fifty-cubit object, described as xylon in the Septuagint (Ancient Greek: ξύλον, romanized: xulon, lit. 'wood'), is similarly ambiguously referred to as "wood" (Latin: lignum). The Vulgate translation of Esther 7:10 furthermore refers to a patibulum, used elsewhere to describe the cross-piece in crucifixion, when describing the fate of Haman: suspensus est itaque Aman in patibulo quod paraverat Mardocheo, 'therefore was Haman suspended on the patibulum he prepared for Mordechai'. In the corner of the Sistine Chapel ceiling is a depiction in fresco of the execution of Haman by Michelangelo; Haman is shown crucified in a manner similar to typical Catholic depictions of the crucifixion of Jesus, though the legs are parted and the apparatus resembles a natural tree shorter than fifty cubits high.

=== English translations ===
Translations of the Book of Esther's description of Haman's execution have variously treated the subject. Wycliffe's Bible referred both to a tre (tree) and a iebat (gibbet), while Coverdale's preferred galowe (gallows). The Geneva Bible used tree but the King James Version established gallows and hang as the most common rendering; the Douay–Rheims Bible later used gibbet. Young's Literal Translation used tree and hang. The New International Version, Common English Bible, and New Living Translation all use impale for Hebrew: ויתלו and pole for Hebrew: העץ.

=== As a god ===
Jacob Hoschander has argued that the name of Haman and that of his father Hamedatha are mentioned by Strabo as Omanus and Anadatus, worshipped with Anahita in the city of Zela. Hoschander suggests that Haman may, if the connection is correct, be a priestly title and not a proper name. Strabo's names are unattested in Persian texts as gods; however the Talmud and Josephus interpret the description of courtiers bowing to Haman in Esther 3:2 as worship (other scholars assume "Omanus" refers to Vohu Mana).

== Purim traditions ==
The Jewish holiday of Purim commemorates the story of the Jews' deliverance and Haman's defeat. On that day, the Book of Esther is publicly read and much noise and tumult is raised at every mention of Haman's name. Various noisemakers (graggers) are used to express disdain for Haman by "blotting out" his name during the recitation of Megillah. Pastry known as hamentashen (Yiddish for 'Haman's pockets'; known in Hebrew as אזני המן, ozney Haman, 'Haman's ears') is traditionally eaten on this day.

Since the 1890s, several academics have "agreed in seeing [The Book of] Esther as a historicized myth or ritual" and generally concluded that Purim has its origin in a Babylonian or Persian myth or festival (though which one is a subject of discussion). However, more recent scholarship places Purim's origins in the region of Palestine instead. However, there are still scholars which see a historical narrative in the text.

== In literature and popular culture ==
=== Dante's Divine Comedy ===
Haman at the moment of his execution appears at the beginning of Canto 17 of Purgatorio in Dante's Divina Commedia. The image occurs in the form of a spontaneous vision given to the character of Dante-as-pilgrim, the purpose of which is to envision Haman's accusers, Ahaseurus, Esther and Mordecai, as emblems of righteous anger. In this divinely inspired hallucination, the fictional Dante sees Haman as "un crucifisso", a man who undergoes crucifixion.

=== Novels ===
Margaret Mitchell's novel, Gone With the Wind (1936) references Haman in the scene in which Rhett Butler, in jail, faces the prospect of hanging.

The Agatha Christie novel, The Mysterious Affair at Styles references Haman in a scene where Poirot, investigating a murder, says he will "hang him as high as Haman".

In the Lord Peter Wimsey novel The Nine Tailors, Lord Peter, revealing that the victim, Geoffrey Deacon, was inadvertently killed by the ringing of bells, declares that his killers are already hanging "far higher than Haman".

=== Visual media ===
Haman is characterised as evil vizier to a sultan in the "Aliyah-Din" segment of the 1994 made-for-television film Scooby-Doo! in Arabian Nights.

He is featured as the primary antagonist in the 1999 South Park episode "Jewbilee", in which he is portrayed as attempting to re-enter the mortal world in order to rule once more over the Jews.

The character was depicted in the American feature film One Night with the King (2006), played by James Callis.

American children's television animations in which the biblical story of Haman is told include the "Queen Esther" episode of the series The Greatest Adventure: Stories from the Bible (1985-1992), where he is voiced by Werner Klemperer, and the computer-generated series VeggieTales (2000), in which he is portrayed by "Mr. Lunt" during the episode "Esther, the Girl who Became Queen".
