= Abihail =

Abihail may refer to one of five different people mentioned in the Bible:

- Abihail the Levite lived during the time of the wandering of the Israelites in the wilderness. He was the head of the house of Merari and Levi's youngest son. (Numbers 3:35)
- Abihail was the wife of Abishur of the tribe of Judah. (I Chronicles 2:29)
- Abihail, from Gilead of Bashan, was head of the tribe of Gad. (I Chronicles 5:14)
- Abihail was the daughter of David's brother Eliab. She was married to David's son Jerimoth and became mother of Rehoboam's wife Mahalath. (II Chronicles 11:18)
- Abihail was the father of Queen Esther and uncle of Mordecai. (Esther 2:15; Esther 9:29)
