= Omar (biblical figure) =

Biblical figure

Omar (Hebrew: אוֹמָר ʾŌmār, possibly meaning "eloquent" or "gifted speaker") was the name of a man mentioned in the Bible, the ancestor of a Semitic Edomite and Canaanite clan, the son of Eliphaz (Esau's eldest son). Omar's brothers were Teiman (the name is later associated with Yemen), Zepho, Ga'atam, Kenaz and Amalek.

Esau and his wife Adah (daughter of Elon the Hittite) were his grandparents. Accordingly, he was a great-grandson of Isaac the son of Abraham.

Historically, his name is first mentioned in the Book of Genesis, Chapter 36, verse 11.

== See also ==
- Omar (name)
