= Zephon (angel) =

Angel in the Hebrew Bible

In the Hebrew Bible, the angelic being Zephon (Hebrew: צְפוֹן Ṣāp̄ōn, Tsāfōn; also Zepho) was also called or distinguished from Zepho son of Eliphaz (Esau's eldest son), an Edomite and associate of Seir. According to the book of Genesis, his brothers were Omar, Teman, (Zepho), Gatam, Kenaz and his half-brother Amalek the son of a concubine. He is mentioned in the chapter of Esau's genealogical records, Genesis 36:11.

According to the legend quoted in Josippon and Jasher, he was captured by the military forces of Joseph and imprisoned, but escaped and was later serving as a general for Libya then Kittim. According to this account, he became a Latin King in Latium which was the area where Rome was to be founded later along the Tiber river. King Zepho son of Eliphaz was called Janus Saturnus by his subjects.

In the Kabbalistic "Treatise on the Left Emanation" by Isaac ha-Cohen of Soria, Zephon (called Tzephon) is one of the angels associated with the 6th sephira, Tiphereth.

In John Milton's Paradise Lost, Zephon, also Zepho was an angel, sent by the archangel Gabriel together with Ithuriel, to find out the location of Satan after his Fall. According to Milton, Zephon is a cherub and a guardian prince of Paradise.

In Canaanite religion Zephon was also identified with Jebel Aqra, the home of the Elohim, from which Yam was cast out.

== See also ==
- List of angels in theology
