= Bahurim =

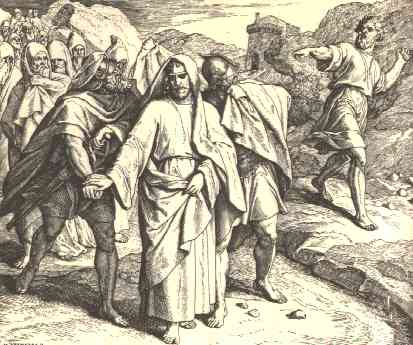
Shimei throwing stones at David outside of Bahurim

Bahurim (etymology uncertain) was a village mentioned in the Hebrew Bible east of Jerusalem, on the road to the Jordan valley, close to the Mount of Olives.

== Biblical references ==
Bahurim is the place where Palti, son of Laish turned back as he cried after his wife, Michal, when she was brought back to her first husband, King David.

It is also mentioned during David's flight from Absalom:

When King David came to Bahurim, there came out a man of the family of the house of Saul whose name was Shimei, the son of Gera; and as he came he cursed continually. And he threw stones at David, and at all the servants of King David; and all the people and all the mighty men were on his right hand and on his left. And Shimei said as he cursed, "Begone, begone, you man of blood, you worthless fellow! The Lord has avenged upon you all the blood of the house of Saul, in whose place you have reigned; and The Lord has given the kingdom into the hand of your son Absalom. See, your ruin is on you; for you are a man of blood." -- (2 Samuel 16:5–8 RSV)

Here also the Cohanim Jonathan and Ahimaaz hid themselves (2 Samuel 17:18).

Azmaveth, one of David's heroes, is also mentioned as a native of Bahurim (2 Samuel 23:31; 1 Chronicles 11:33).

== Identification ==
A Jewish tradition in the Targum identifies Bahurim with Almon (Joshua 21:18), later called Almît, about 4 miles N.E. of Jerusalem, and a mile beyond Anathoth (Anâta). It has also been identified with Râs et-Tumein, north-east of the Mount of Olives. Râs et-Tumein is located at 1744.1333 (Palestine grid coordinates). However, it seems to be more likely that Bahurim was located at a place known as Barruka, located at 1750.1318 (Palestine grid coordinates) which disengages Ras et Tmim for the identification with Nob.

French archaeologist and historical geographer, Victor Guérin, identified the site Bahurim with Abu Dis, a village 3 km, south-east of Jerusalem, before the suburbs of Jerusalem began to expand. The village, he argues, underwent a metamorphosis in name change; the name evolving from Būrīs, or Wadīs by another account, to what it is today. According to Zohar Amar, the name can be traced back, etymologically, to its earlier Greek pronunciation Baoureis (Baoureim) (with the absence of the voiceless pharyngeal fricative "chet", which has a slight aspirated sound in Hebrew, but does not exist in Greek pronunciation).
