= Palti, son of Laish =

Biblical character

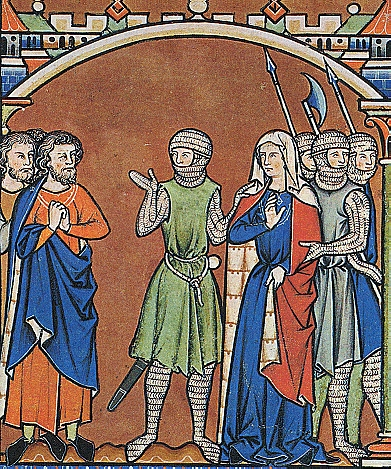
Illustration from the Morgan Bible of Michal being taken from Palti.

Palti (or Paltiel), son of Laish, who was from Gallim, was the second husband of Michal, Saul's daughter. Where other versions read "Palti" (1 Samuel 25:44) and "Paltiel" (2 Samuel 3:15), the KJV has Phalti and Phaltiel, respectively.

Michal was originally David's wife, but Saul gave her to Palti after she helped David escape from Saul. Later, after David was anointed, but before he succeeded Saul as King of Judah, David demanded of Ish-bosheth, Saul's son (and Michal's brother), that Michal be returned to David as his wife, as a condition of an alliance between them. This Ish-bosheth granted, sending Abner, a military leader, to bring Michal to David.

The biblical account says that Palti "followed her weeping as far as Bahurim. But Abner said to him 'Go Back!'. And he turned back.". According to the Talmud, Palti never consummated his marriage with Michal, but kept a sword between them while in bed to separate them. The Talmud explains his weeping as sorrow over the loss of a good deed, and not as weeping for the loss of Michal herself:

Is it not written (II Samuel 3.16), He went weeping? —This was for losing the good deed [of self-restraint]. Hence [he followed her] to [the town called] Bahurim (literally, youths), implying that they both had remained like unmarried youths and not tasted the pleasure of marital relations.

British Reform Rabbi Jonathan Magonet has described the episode as 'one of those remarkable subversive moments' when we are forced to confront the dark side of a heroic character (David), to ask what really matters, and what price might be too high to pay for something. Palti loses his wife, 'but for one brief moment he helps turn our perception of the world inside out'.

An interesting account of Paltiel is found in the novel The Secret Book of Kings, by Yochi Brandes.
