= Sons of Haman =

Biblical figures in the Book of Esther

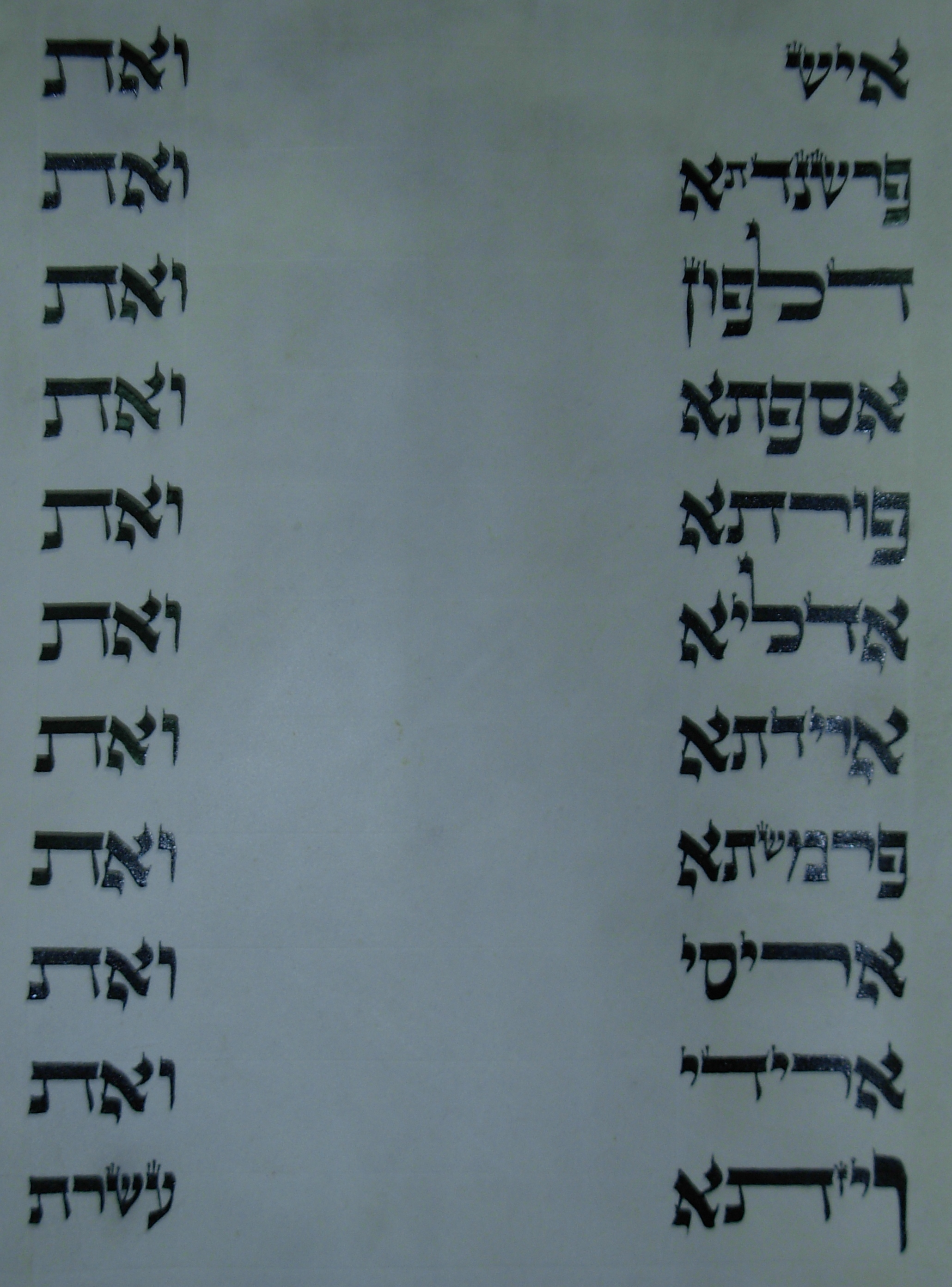
The names of Haman's ten sons written on a scroll

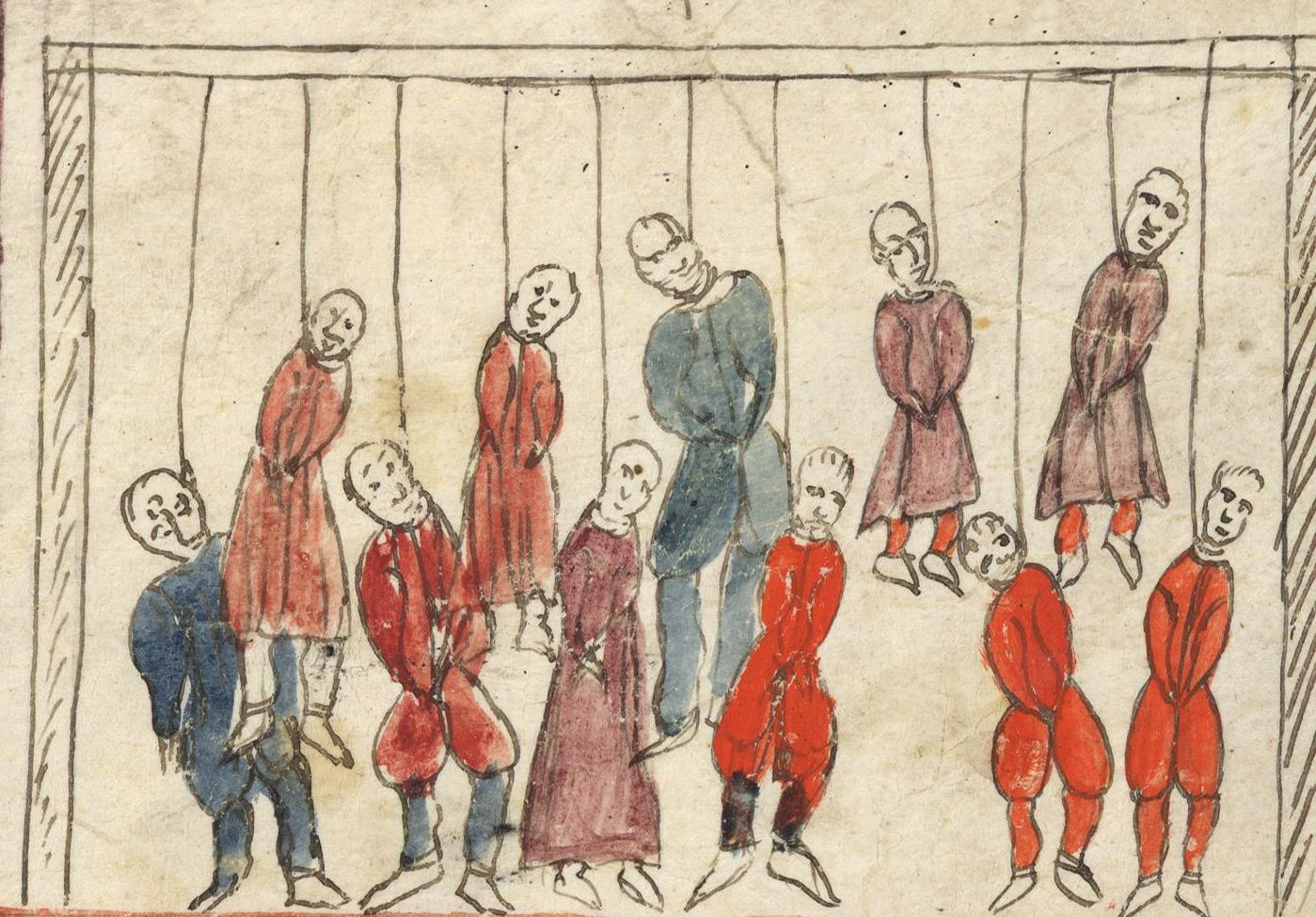
Depiction of the ten sons of Haman hanging on the gallows. From an illustrated Book of Esther created in the city of Ferrara, Italy, in 1617. From the collections of the National Library of Israel.

The sons of Haman were ten men mentioned by name in the biblical book of Esther who were killed on the 13th of Adar and hanged the following day, the 14th of Adar.

The names of Haman's ten sons have been variously interpreted in terms of their possible Iranian forms. Some of the names can reasonably be considered to be Iranian, but it is difficult to notice a clear pattern of Iranian forms in them. The names given in the biblical text are:

- Parshandata: first son of Haman to be mentioned. This name, which includes the Iranian root *dāta, is documented on a Phoenician seal from the late Achaemenid period. In the 12th century, the name gained a literary meaning. It was then separated into the words "parsan" (= "interpreter") and "data" (= "law"), and was used with reference to Rashi, who has since been cited by that name.
- Dalphon: the second of Haman's ten sons. His name appears to be of Semitic origin, rather than Iranian. Tricia Miller suggests that it derives from the Babylonian name Dallupu. It is also attested in the Septuagint as Δελφών.
- Aspatha: third son to be mentioned, whose name in Hebrew is אַסְפָּֽתָא. The name is probably a hypocoristicon representing *Aspata, from the Median word *aspa ("horse") suffixed with -āta.
- Poratha: the fourth son of Haman to be mentioned. Its name in Hebrew is פּוֹרָתָא, probably derived from a Persian name which may be *Puru-bāta ("having much wine").
- Adalia: the name in Hebrew is אֲדַלְיָ֖א. Its etymology remains uncertain.
- Aridatha: The Iranian form of the name is probably *Ariya-dāta ("who has/follows the law of the Aryans").
- Parmashta: The etymology of this name remains uncertain. Tricia Miller suggests that it derives from the Old Persian *fara-ma-istha.
- Arisai: This may be a two-rooted name composed with *ariya ("Aryan"), although the interpretation of the second half of the name remains uncertain. It might be derived from a two-rooted nickname *Ariya-s-aya, although it remains unclear which full name this refers to. It is also possible that the full two-rooted original form was *Ariya-sravah ("Aryan fame, having the fame of the Aryans").
- Aridai: This name, which is also attested on a Phoenician seal from the late-5th century BC, is possibly derived from *Ariya-d-aya (having the element *ariya, "Aryan" as with Aridatha and Arisai).
- Vaizatha: The name clearly appears to derive from ancient Iranian *Vahya-zāta- “born of the best”.

According to the Talmud, Haman had many other sons. Talmudic scholars disagreed on the number of Haman's sons; according to one account, there were thirty: ten died, ten were hanged, and ten became beggars. According to the rabbis, the beggars numbered seventy; according to Rami bar Abi, there were a total of two hundred and eight sons in all. Rashi explains that those ten who were killed and hanged are the ones who wrote hateful words about the Jews and Jerusalem. The Hebrew text displays peculiarities. It can be noted that the names of Haman's ten sons are written vertically, one below the other, in a column; according to Jewish tradition, this indicates that they were hanged one above the other on an extremely tall gallows.

R. Mordechai Sasson explains that Haman symbolizes the Yetzer Harah (evil inclination), and his ten sons allude to his ten traits of bad character. Their deaths represent the elimination of these evil traits when defeated by the Yetzer Tov (good inclination). He explains the meaning of each name and how each corresponds to a type of evil.
