= Jerimoth =

Jerimoth (Hebrew: ירִימוֹת, sometimes spelled Jeremoth) in the Hebrew Bible is the name of eight men:

- In 1 Chronicles 7:7, Jerimoth is a son of Bela.
- In 1 Chronicles 7:8, Jerimoth is a son of Becher.
- In 1 Chronicles 12:5, Jerimoth is a Benjamite and one of David's Mighty Warriors.
- In 1 Chronicles 23:23, 24:30 Jerimoth is a Levite of the family of Merari.
- In 1 Chronicles 25:4,22 Jerimoth is a descendant of Heman.
- In 1 Chronicles 27:19 Jerimoth is a ruler of the tribe of Naphtali.
- In 2 Chronicles 11:18 Jerimoth is a son of King David.
- In 2 Chronicles 31:13 Jerimoth is a Levite and an overseer in the Temple of Jerusalem in the reign of King Hezekiah.
