= Eliphaz =

Character from the Book of Genesis

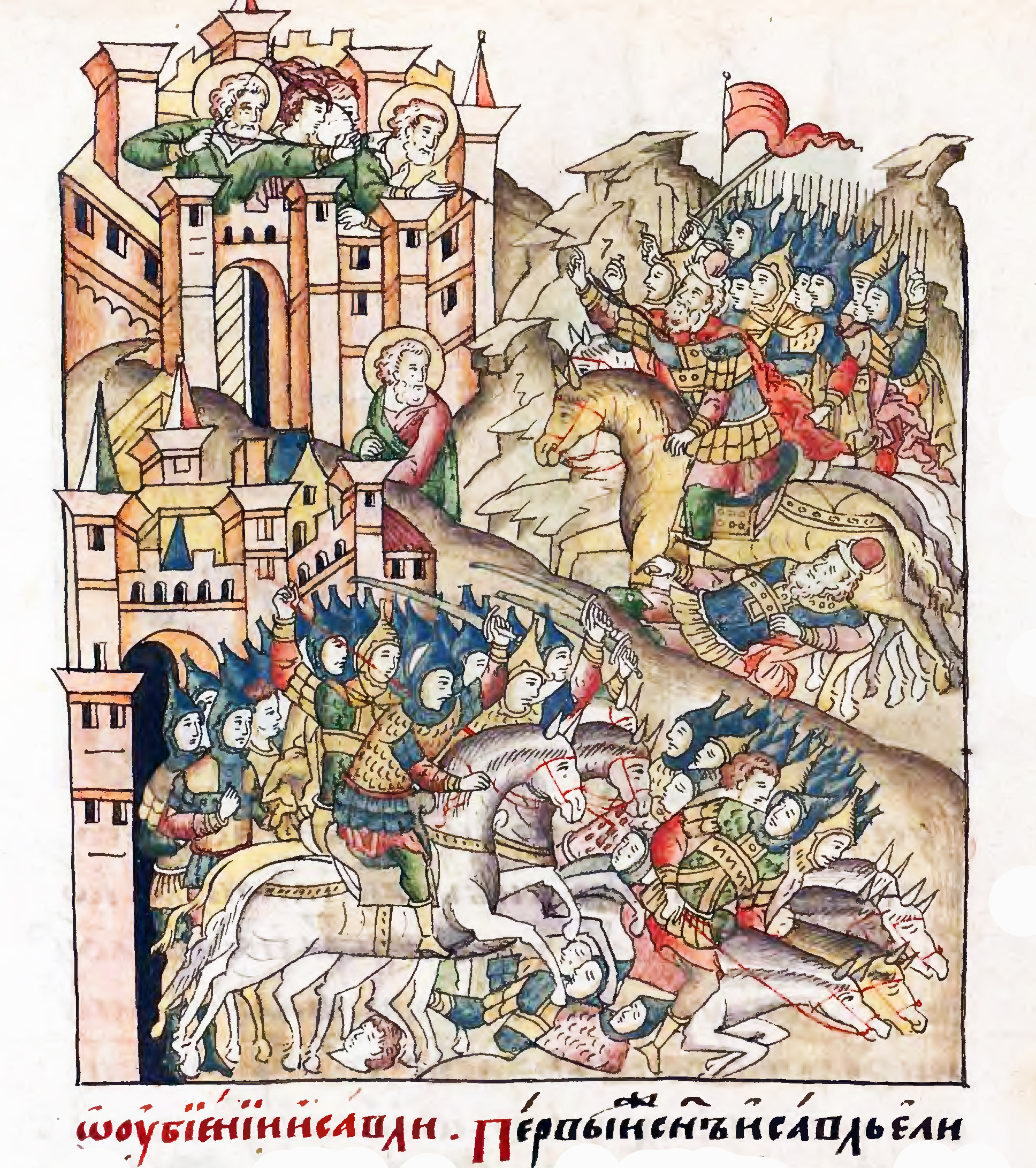
Isaac kills Esau

[He had nothing] because Eliphaz the son of Esau had pursued him to kill him at his father’s orders; he (Eliphaz) overtook him, but since he had grown up in Isaac’s lap, he held back his hand. He said to him (Jacob), ”What shall I do about my father’s orders?“ Jacob replied,”Take what I have, for a poor man is counted as dead." - [from Bereishit Rabbathi by Rabbi Moshe Hadarshan]

— Rashi to the Book of Genesis, Gen 29:11

Eliphaz (Hebrew: אֱלִיפַז/אֱלִיפָז "My Elohim is gold", Standard Hebrew Elifaz, Tiberian Hebrew ʾĔlîp̄az / ʾĔlîp̄āz) was the first-born son of Esau and his wife Adah. He had six sons, of whom Omar was the firstborn, and the others were Teman, Zepho, Gatam, Kenaz and finally Amalek, who was born to his concubine Timna. The people of Amalek were the ancestral enemy of the Israelite people (Book of Exodus Ex 17:16 ; Book of Deuteronomy Deut 25:19 ; I Samuel 1Sam 15:2–3).

The Midrash relates that when Jacob escaped from Esau and fled to his uncle Laban in Haran, Esau sent Eliphaz to pursue and kill Jacob, his uncle, who was his Rabbi also. When they met, Jacob implored Eliphaz not to kill him, but Eliphaz challenged that he had his father's instructions to fulfill. Jacob gave everything he had with him to Eliphaz and said, ”Take what I have, for a poor man is counted as dead." Eliphaz was satisfied and left his uncle and rabbi poor, but still alive: (Rashi to the Book of Genesis Gen 29:11)

According to Louis Ginzburg's Legends of the Jews, Eliphaz was a prophet.

== See also ==
- Obadiah
