= Armoni and Mephibosheth =

Sons of Saul and Rizpah according to the Hebrew Bible

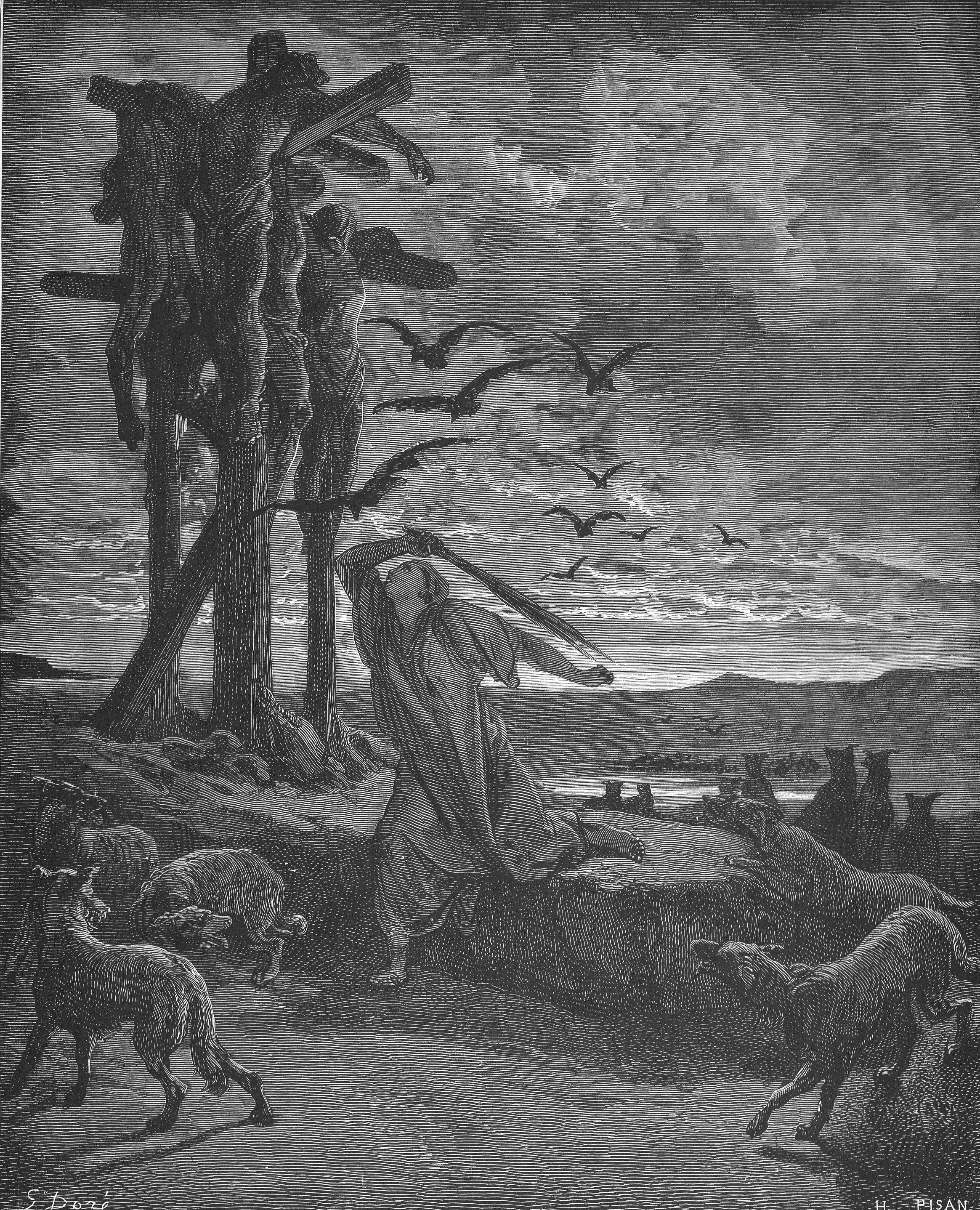
Depiction by Gustave Doré of Rizpah guarding the bodies of Armoni and Mephibosheth

Armoni and Mephibosheth are named in the Hebrew Bible as the two sons of Saul by his concubine Rizpah, daughter of Aiah. After Saul's death, they were killed in revenge for his violence against the Gibeonites.

== Biblical narrative ==
Their deaths are described in the Second Book of Samuel, chapter 21. It describes how Israel suffered a three-year famine, which was thought to have happened because Saul had earlier wronged the Gibeonites. The Gibeonites told King David that nothing would now compensate them but the death of seven of Saul's sons (2 Samuel 21:1–6). David accordingly handed them Armoni, Mephibosheth [the son of Saul, not to be confused with Mephibosheth, who was the son of Jonathan], and five of Saul's grandsons (the sons of Merab and Adriel).

The Gibeonites killed all seven, and hung up their bodies at the sanctuary at Gibeah (2 Samuel 21:8–9). For five months their bodies were hung out in the elements, and the grieving Rizpah guarded them from being eaten by the beasts and birds of prey (2 Samuel 21:10). Finally, David had the bodies taken down and buried in the family grave at Zelah with the remains of Saul and their half-brother Jonathan. (2 Samuel 21:13–14).
