= Rizpah =

Concubine of Israelite king Saul

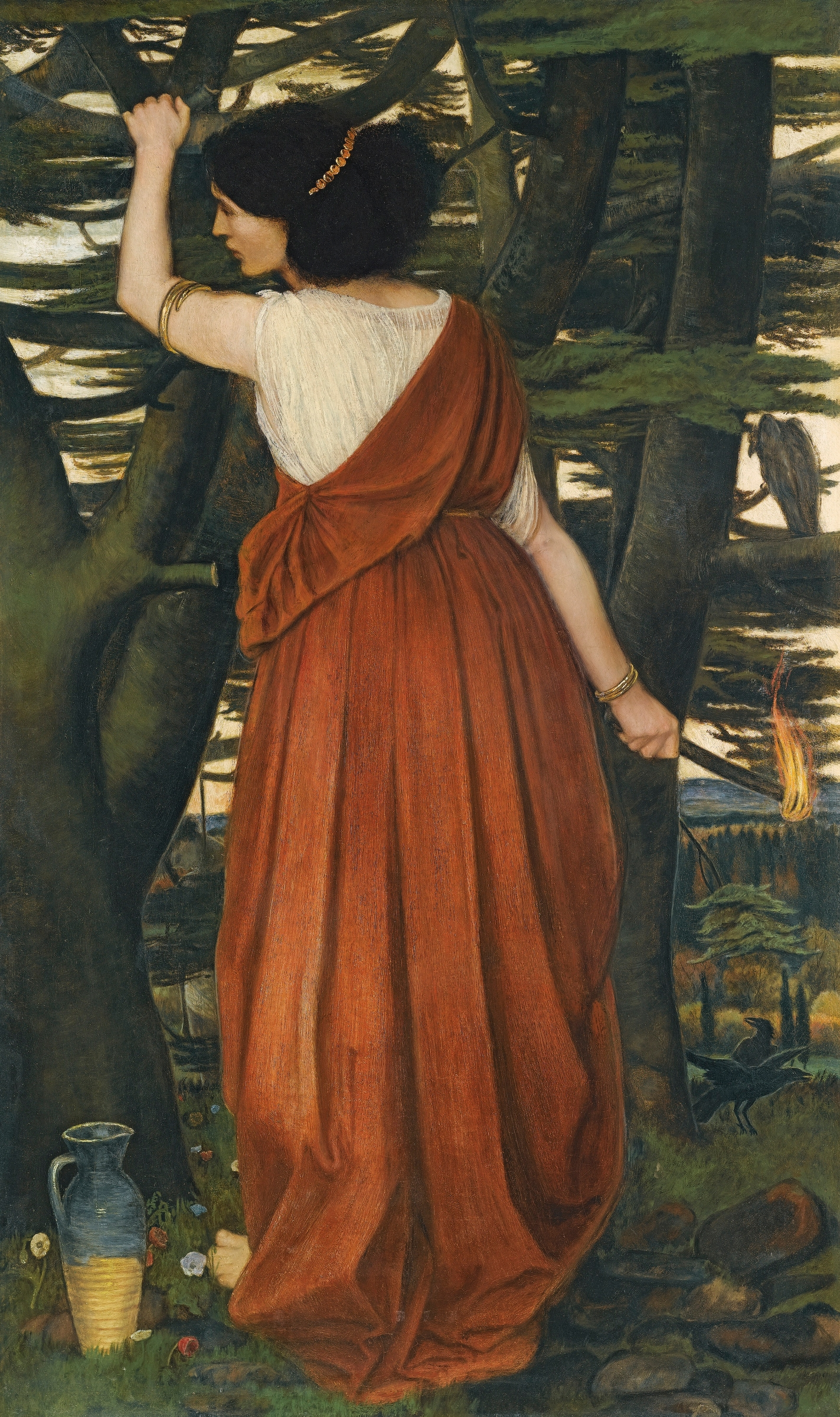
Rispah, The Daughter Of Aiah, John Roddam Spencer Stanhope, 1864

Rizpah (riz'-pa, "coal", "hot stone") was the daughter of Aiah, and one of Saul's concubines. She was the mother of Armoni and Mephibosheth (2 Samuel 3:7; 21:8–11).

After the death of Saul, according to the Bible, Abner was implicitly accused of having aspirations to the throne by taking Rizpah as his wife, resulting in a quarrel between him and Saul's son and successor, Ishbosheth. (2 Samuel 3:7–8) The quarrel led to Abner's defection to David, (2 Samuel 3:17–21) who was then king of the breakaway Kingdom of Judah. This incident led to the downfall of Ishbosheth and the rise of David as king of a reunited Kingdom of Israel.

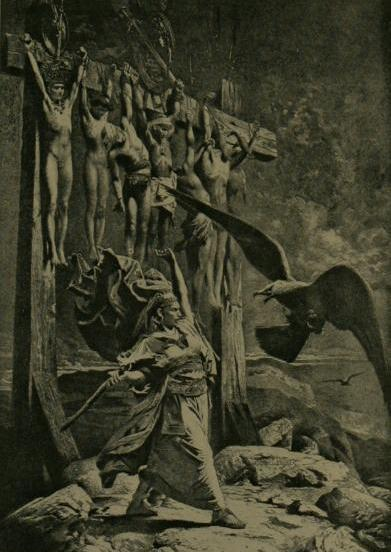
Rizpah protecting the bodies of her sons

A famine lasting three years hit Israel during the earlier half of David's reign at Jerusalem. God revealed that this calamity happened because of "Saul and for his bloody house, because he slew the Gibeonites." The Gibeonites were not Israelites, but the remnant of the Amorites, which Saul pursued from within Israel. David inquired of the Gibeonites what satisfaction they demanded, and was answered that nothing would compensate for the wrong Saul had done to them but the death of seven of Saul's sons.(2 Samuel 21:1–6)

David accordingly delivered up to them the two sons of Rizpah and five of the sons of Michal (according to the Masoretic Text; the Septuagint has "Merab"), Saul's daughter. These the Gibeonites put to death, and hung up their bodies at the sanctuary at Gibeah (2 Samuel 21:8–9). Rizpah thereupon took her place on the rock of Gibeah, and for five months watched the suspended bodies of her children, to prevent them from being devoured by the beasts and birds of prey, (2 Samuel 21:10) till they were at length taken down and buried by David (2 Samuel 21:13) in the family grave at Zelah with the bones of Saul and Jonathan. Only once both restitution had been made for Saul's betrayal of the Gibeonites and an olive branch extended to Rizpah and the house of Saul by giving Saul's sons the honour of burial with their father did God respond to the plea of the land and end the famine (2 Samuel 21:14).

British rabbi Jonathan Magonet has described Rizpah as "every mother who sees her sons killed before their time for reasons of state, be they in time of peace or in war. All that remains is for her to preserve the dignity of their memory and live on to bear witness and call to account the rulers of the world".
