= David and Jonathan (disambiguation) =

David and Jonathan are figures in the Books of Samuel in the Hebrew Bible.

David and Jonathan may also refer to:

- David and Jonathan (film), a 1920 British silent film
- David and Jonathan (band), British pop duo
- David et Jonathan, French vocal duo
- David et Jonathas, an opera by Marc-Antoine Charpentier
- Jonathan David (song), song and single by Belle and Sebastian
- David and Jonathan (Rembrandt), a painting
