= David and Jonathan =

Biblical heroic figures of the Kingdom of Israel

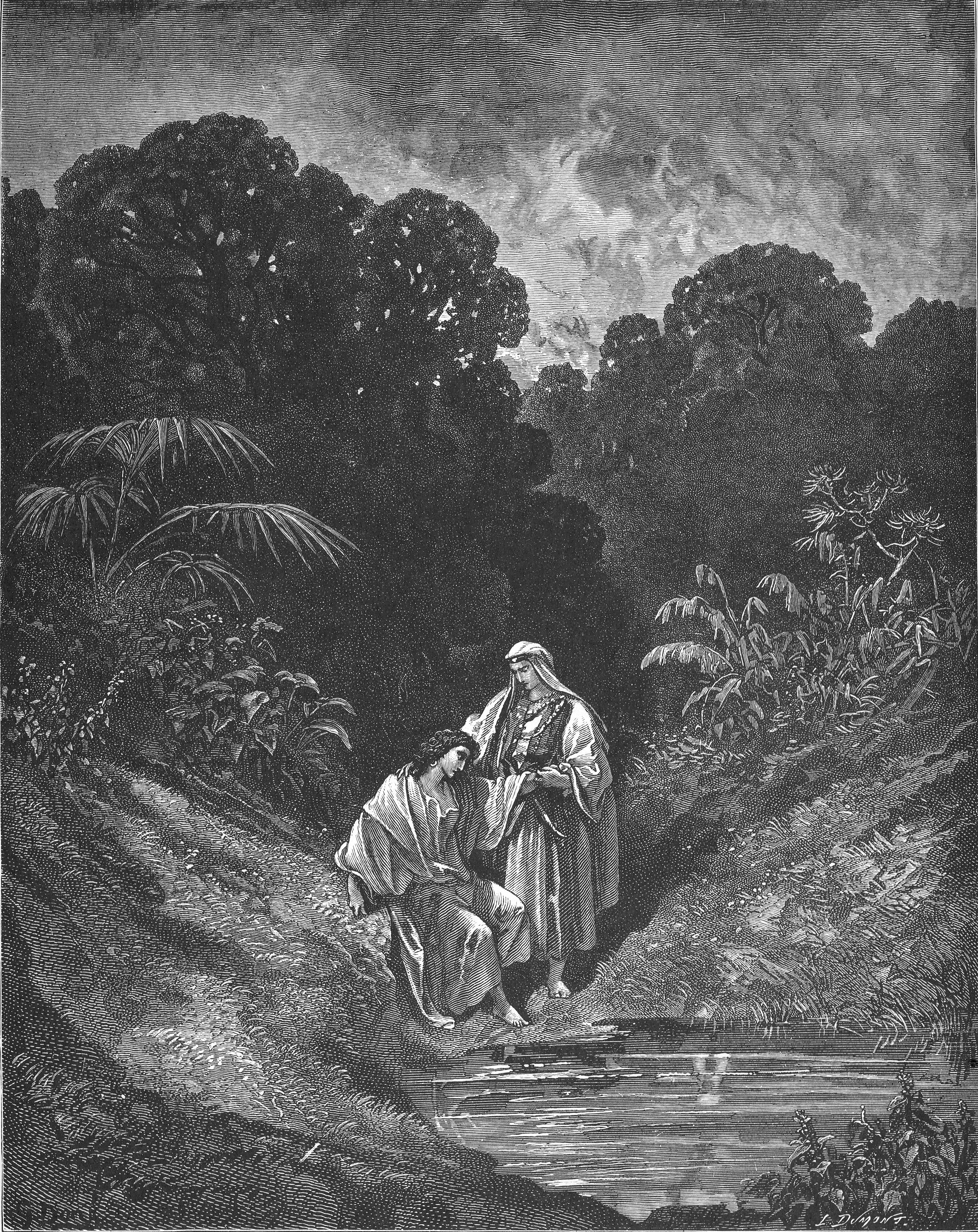
"David and Jonathan", one of Gustave Doré's illustrations for La Grande Bible de Tours

David and Jonathan were, according to the Hebrew Bible's Books of Samuel, heroic figures of the Kingdom of Israel, who formed a covenant, taking a mutual oath.

Jonathan was the son of Saul, king of Israel, of the tribe of Benjamin, and David was the son of Jesse of Bethlehem, of the tribe of Judah, and Jonathan's presumed rival for the crown. David became king. The covenant the two men had formed eventually led to David, after Jonathan's death, graciously seating Jonathan's son Mephibosheth at his own royal table instead of eradicating the former king Saul's line.

The biblical text does not explicitly depict the nature of the relationship between David and Jonathan. The traditional and mainstream religious interpretation of the relationship has been one of platonic love and an example of homosociality. Some scholars and writers—late Middle Ages and onwards—have emphasized what they see as elements of homoeroticism in the story.

== In the Bible ==
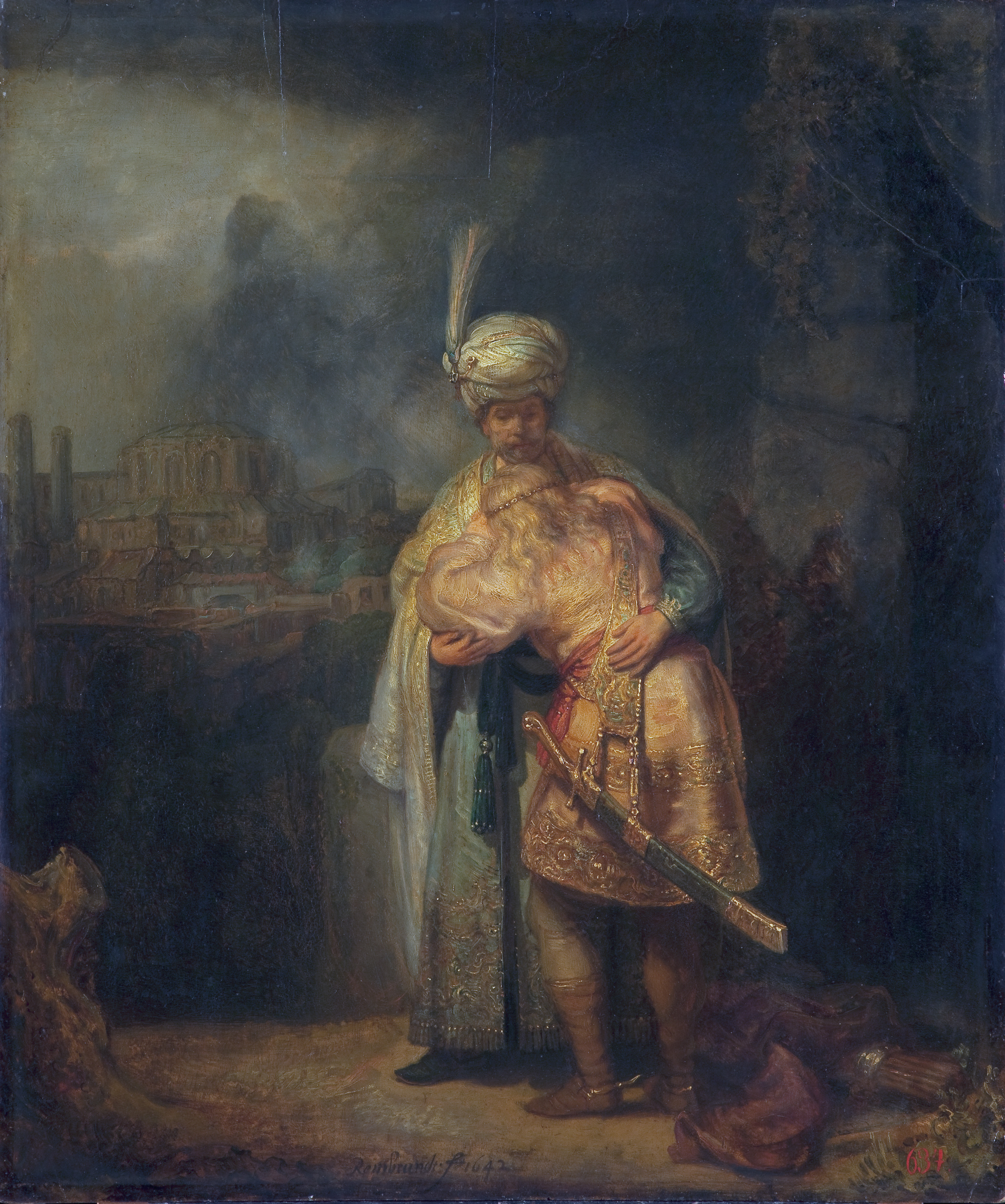
David and Jonathan by Rembrandt, c. 1642

The relationship between David and Jonathan is mainly covered in the First Book of Samuel of the Hebrew Bible. The episodes belong to David's ascent to power, commonly regarded as one of the sources of the Deuteronomistic history and its later additions.

David, the youngest son of Jesse, kills Goliath at the Valley of Elah where the Philistine army was in a standoff with the army of King Saul, Jonathan's father. David's victory begins a rout of the Philistines who are driven back to Gath and the gates of Ekron. Abner brings David to Saul while David is still holding Goliath's severed head. Jonathan, the eldest son of Saul, has also been fighting the Philistines. Jonathan takes an immediate liking to David, and the two form a covenant:

Now it came about when he had finished speaking to Saul, that the soul of Jonathan was knit to the soul of David, and Jonathan loved him as himself. Saul took him that day and did not let him return to his father's house. Then Jonathan made a covenant with David because he loved him as himself. Jonathan stripped himself of the robe that was on him and gave it to David, with his armor, including his sword and his bow and his belt. So David went out wherever Saul sent him, and prospered; and Saul set him over the men of war.

=== Death of Jonathan ===
David proved a successful commander, and as his popularity increased, so did Saul's jealousy. In the hope that the Philistines might kill David, Saul gives David his daughter Michal in marriage, provided that David slay a hundred Philistines and bring their foreskins to him; David returns with two-fold the requirement. After the wedding, the disappointed Saul sends assassins to the newlyweds' quarters, but David escapes with the help of Michal. Despite several short-term reconciliations, David remains an exile and an outlaw.

As Saul continues to pursue David, David and Jonathan renew their covenant, after which they do not meet again. Jonathan is slain on Mount Gilboa along with his brothers Abinadab and Malchi-shua, and Saul commits suicide. David learns of Saul and Jonathan's death and chants a lament, which in part says:

Saul and Jonathan, beloved and pleasant in their life, And in their death they were not parted; They were swifter than eagles, They were stronger than lions ... How have the mighty fallen in the midst of the battle! Jonathan is slain on your high places. I am distressed for you, my brother Jonathan; You have been very pleasant to me. Your love to me was more wonderful than the love of women. How have the mighty fallen, And the weapons of war perished!

== Views ==
=== Jewish interpretation ===
The sages characterized the relationship between Jonathan and David in the following Mishnah:

“Whenever love depends on some selfish end, when the end passes away, the love passes away; but if it does not depend on some selfish end, it will never pass away. Which love depended on a selfish end? This was the love of Amnon and Tamar. And which did not depend on a selfish end? This was the love of David and Jonathan. (Avot 5:16)"

Rabbi Shimon ben Tzemach Duran (Spain, North Africa 14th–15th century) delineated the significance of this mishnah:

“Anyone who establishes a friendship for access to power, money, or sexual relations; when these ends are not attainable, the friendship ceases…love that is not dependent on selfish ends is true love of the other person since there is no intended end.” (Magen Avot – abridged and adapted translation)

=== Traditional Christian interpretation ===
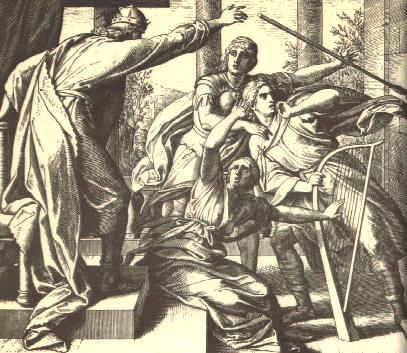
"Saul Tries to Kill David" by Julius Schnorr von Karolsfeld

In Christian tradition, David and Jonathan's love is understood as the intimate camaraderie between two young soldiers with no sexual involvement. David's abundance of wives and concubines is emphasized, alongside his adulterous affair with Bathsheba.

In response to the argument that homoeroticism was edited out, some traditionalists who subscribe to the Documentary Hypothesis note the significance of the lack of censoring of the descriptions at issue, in spite of the Levitical injunctions against homoerotic contact. Gagnon states, "The narrator’s willingness to speak of David’s vigorous heterosexual life (compare the relationship with Bathsheba) puts in stark relief his (their) complete silence about any sexual activity between David and Jonathan."

Presuming such editing would have taken place, Martti Nissinen comments, "Their mutual love was certainly regarded by the editors as faithful and passionate, but without unseemly allusions to forbidden practices ... Emotional and even physical closeness of two males did not seem to concern the editors of the story, nor was such a relationship prohibited by Leviticus." Homosociality is not seen as being part of the sexual taboo in the biblical world.

=== Medieval and Renaissance allusions ===
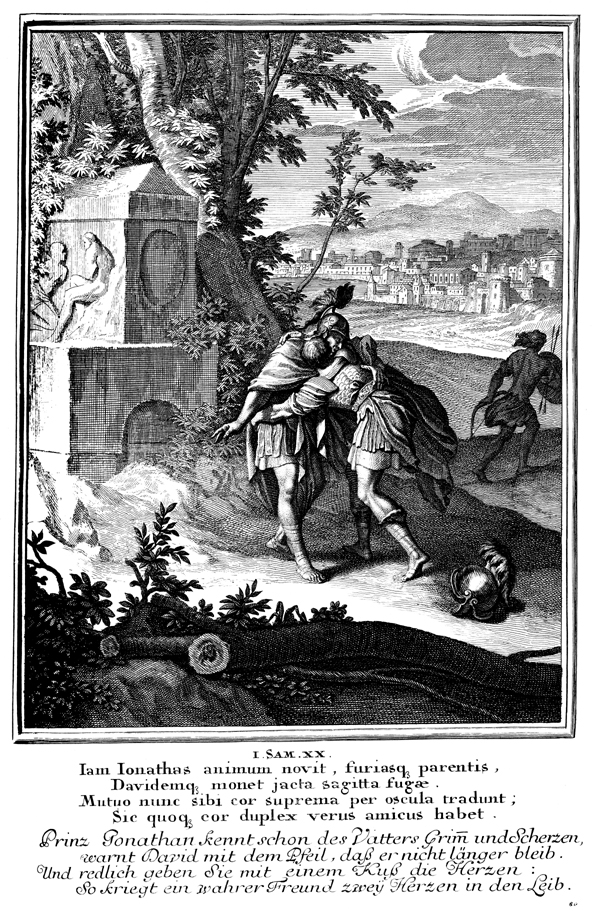
Jonathan embraces David from Caspar Luiken's Historiae Celebriores Veteris Testamenti Iconibus Representatae (1712)

Medieval literature occasionally drew upon the biblical relationship between David and Jonathan to underline strong personal, intimate friendships and homoerotic relationships between men.

The anonymous Vita Edwardi Secundi, c. 1326 AD, wrote: "Indeed I do remember to have heard that one man so loved another. Jonathan cherished David, Achilles loved Patroclus." And thus, King Edward II wept for his dead lover Piers Gaveston as: "... David had mourned for Jonathan." Similarly, Roger of Hoveden, a twelfth-century chronicler, deliberately drew comparisons in his description of "The King of France (Philip II Augustus) [who] loved him (Richard the Lionheart) as his own soul."

The Renaissance artists Donatello and Michelangelo both brought out strong homoerotic elements in their sculptural depictions of the youthful David, which were bronze and marble, respectively.

=== Modern interpretations ===
==== Homoeroticism ====
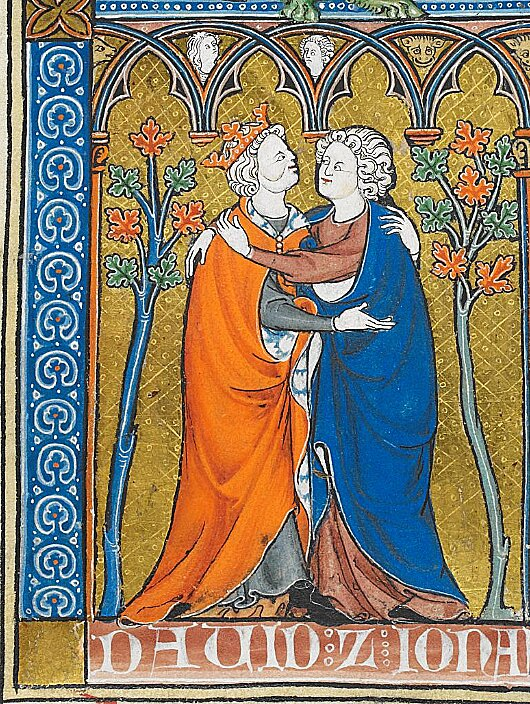
David and Jonathan The biblical account of David and Jonathan has been read by some as the story of two lovers. "La Somme le Roi", AD 1290; French illuminated ms (detail); British Museum

As early as 1978, various theologians argued that the covenant and deep relationship between David and Jonathan would be a biblical basis for same-sex marriage. This was first pioneered by Tom Horner, then adopted by John Boswell.

The story of David and Jonathan is introduced in Samuel 1 (18:1), where it says that "Jonathan became one in spirit with David, and he loved him as himself", something that modern scholars have described as philia or love at first sight. (Note: In the text, the attraction of Jonathan to David begins almost immediately, as Saul is delighted by his new companion. This attraction is given extravagant expression. In the first place it appears to be love (philia) at first sight. We are told: "When David had finished speaking to Saul, the soul of Jonathan was bound to the soul of David" (1 Sam 18:1). It seems unlikely that it was caused by something David has said, since what David said to Saul immediately preceding is only "I am the son of your servant Jesse the Bethlehemite" (17:58). Joyce Baldwin suggests that this indicates that Jonathan recognised David as the future king.) For Theodore Jennings, it is clear that Jonathan's "immediate" attraction to David was caused by his beauty:

"As we have noticed, the attraction of Jonathan to David begins almost immediately as Saul is delighted in his new companion. This attraction is given extravagant expression. In the first place it appears to be love at first sight. We are told: "When David had finished speaking to Saul, the soul of Jonathan was bound to the soul of David" (1 Sam 18:1). Is it something David has said? Not likely. For what David has said to Saul is "I am the son of your servant Jesse the Bethlehemite" (17:58). It is not something David has said. Instead, the reader's gaze has twice been directed to David's extraordinary beauty."

The relationship between David and Jonathan has also been compared more explicitly to other homoerotic relationships in Near Eastern literature, including by Cyrus H. Gordon, who noted the instance in the Book of Jashar, excerpted in Samuel 2 (1:26), in which David "proclaims that Jonathan's love was sweeter to him than the love of a woman", as being similar to both Achilles' comparison of Patroclus to a girl and Gilgamesh's love for Enkidu "as a woman".

David's praise in 2 Samuel 1:26 for Jonathan's love (for him) over the love of women has been read as evidence for same-sex attraction, along with Saul's exclamation to his son at the dinner table, "I know you have chosen the son of Jesse – which is a disgrace to yourself and the nakedness of your mother!" According to some biblical scholars, the "choosing" (bahar) indicates a permanent choice and firm homoerotic relationship, and the mention of "nakedness" (erwa) is to convey a negative sexual nuance, which would give the impression that Saul saw something indecent in Jonathan and David's relationship.

Some also point out that the relationship between the two men is addressed with the same words and emphasis as other love relationships in the Hebrew Testament, whether heterosexual or between God and people, such as ahava or אהבה.

There is more than mere homosociality in the dealings of David and Jonathan, as asserted by two 21st-century studies: the biblical scholar Susan Ackerman, and the Orientalist Jean-Fabrice Nardelli. Ackerman and Nardelli argue that the narrators of the books of Samuel encrypted same-sex allusions in the texts where David and Jonathan interact so as to insinuate that the two heroes were lovers. Ackerman explains this as a case of liminal, viz. transitory, homosexuality, deployed by the redactors as a textual means to assert David's rights against Jonathan's: the latter willingly alienated his princely status by bowing down (1 Samuel 20:41), sexually speaking, to the former. Nardelli disagrees and argues that the various covenants Jonathan engaged David into as the superior partner gradually elevated David's status and may be seen as marriage-like.

Susan Ackerman also argues that there is highly eroticized language present in six different sections in the Hebrew Bible in regards to the relationship of David and Jonathan. The six sections she mentions are:

1. David and Jonathan's first meeting in 1 Sam. 18:1–4
2. the description of David and Jonathan's first few meetings in 1 Sam. 19:1–7
3. the incident of Saul berating Jonathan for his friendship with David in 1 Sam. 20:30–34
4. David fleeing from the court of King Saul in 1 Sam. 20:1–42
5. the description of David and Jonathan's final meeting in 1 Sam. 23:15–18
6. David's lament (the Song of the Bow) for Saul and Jonathan in 2 Sam. 1:17–27

Of these six examples, Ackerman identifies the most important example being the last one (the Song of the Bow) due to David's assertion that Jonathan's love to David "was more wonderful than the love of women".

Although David was married, David himself articulates a distinction between his relationship with Jonathan and the bonds he shares with women. David is married to many women, one of whom is Jonathan's sister Michal, but the Bible does not mention David loving Michal (though it is stated that Michal loves David).

Martti Nissinen has concluded:

Perhaps these homosocial relationships, based on love and equality, are more comparable with modern homosexual people's experience of themselves than those texts that explicitly speak of homosexual acts that are aggressive, violent expressions of domination and subjection.

A number of groups made up of gay Roman Catholics trying to reconcile their faith with their sexuality have also adopted the names: Davide e Gionata (Italy), and David et Jonathan (France).

==== Counter-arguments ====
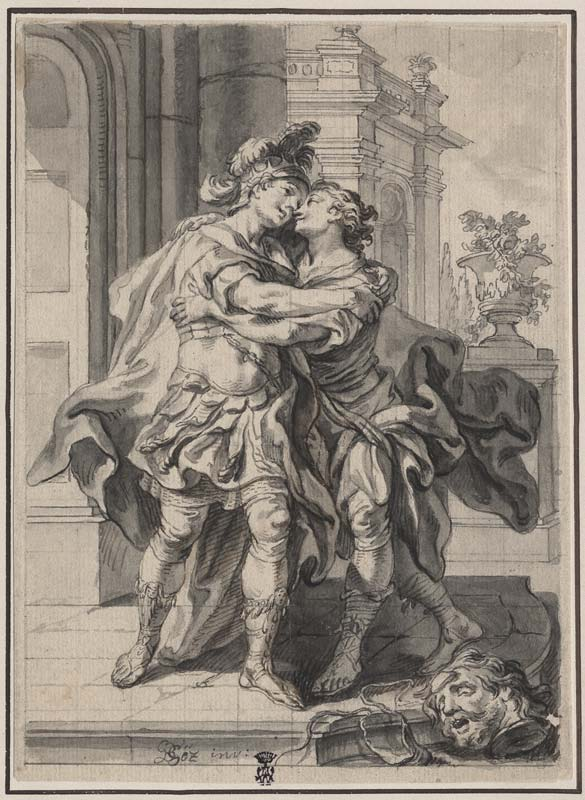
Jonathan greeting David after killing Goliath, 18th century illustration by Gottfried Bernhard Göz

Other interpreters point out that neither the books of Samuel nor Jewish tradition documents sanctioned romantic or erotic physical intimacy between the two characters, which the Bible elsewhere makes evident when between heterosexuals, most supremely in the Song of Solomon. It is also known that covenants were common, and that marriage was a public event and included customs not seen in this story.

The platonic interpretation of David and Jonathan's relationship is advocated by the religious writer Robert A. J. Gagnon and the Assyriologist Markus Zehnder and is consistent with commonly held theological views condemning same sex relations.

The removal of the robe is seen as a ceremonial act following the precedent of Aaron, of whom God commanded, "And strip Aaron of his garments, and put them upon Eleazar his son", in transference of the office of the former upon the latter. In like manner, Jonathan would be symbolically and prophetically transferring the kingship of himself (as the normal heir) to David, which would come to pass.

Even if the mention of "nakedness" in 1 Samuel 20:30 could be interpreted to convey a negative sexual nuance, it is related to Jonathan's mother Ahinoam rather than Jonathan ("to the shame of the nakedness of your mother"). Jon Levenson and Baruch Halpern suggest that the phrase suggests "David's theft of Saul's wife", and that the verse supports the construction that Ahinoam, the wife of Saul is the same Ahinoam who became David's wife. This event, however, is never described in the Bible, and this particular interpretation has been disputed by Diana V. Edelman, who remarked that, "Such a presumption would require David to have run off with the queen mother while Saul was still on the throne, which seems unlikely."

In platonic respects, such as in sacrificial loyalty and zeal for the kingdom, Jonathan's love is seen as surpassing that of romantic or erotic affection, especially that of the women David had known up until that time. The grammatical and social difficulties are pointed out in respect to 1 Samuel 18:21, as well as the marked difference in the Bible between sensual kissing (as in Song of Songs) and the social kiss of Near Eastern cultures, whether in greeting, or as expression of deep affection between friends and family (as found throughout the Old and New Testaments). The strong emotive language expressed by David towards Jonathan is also argued to be akin to that of platonic expressions in more expressive or pre-urban cultures.

Orly Keren of the Kaye Academic College of Education additionally posits that the relationship between Jonathan and David was not without enlightened self-interest on both sides: Jonathan in obtaining guarantees for his own future and that of his family, and David in creating and maintaining a public image. Keren suggests that David's lament for Jonathan may have been a calculated pose for a people mourning a popular prince.

== Cultural references ==
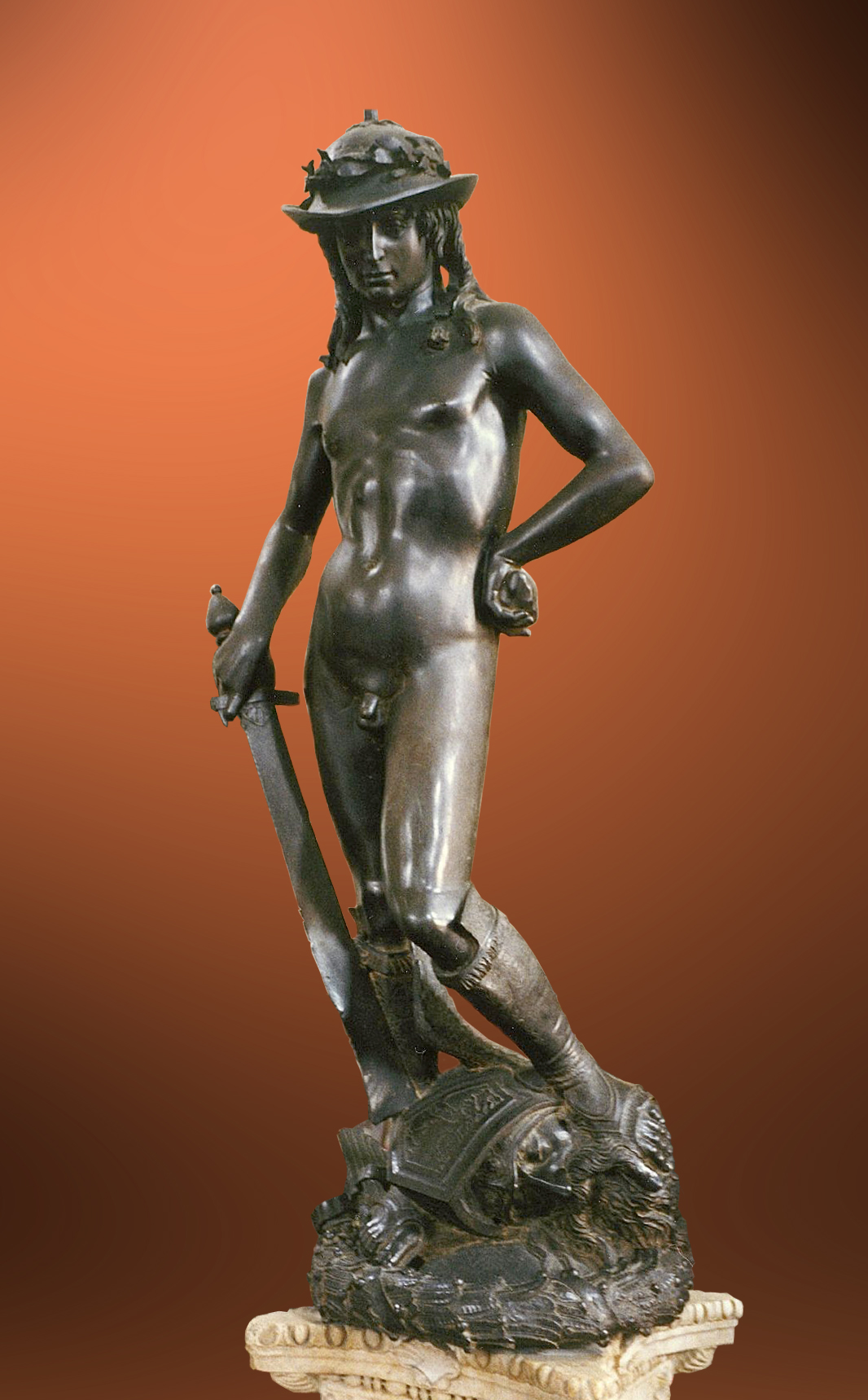
Bronze David by Donatello, 15th century

At his 1895 trial, Oscar Wilde cited the example of David and Jonathan in support of "The love that dare not speak its name": "Such a great affection of an elder for a younger man as there was between David and Jonathan, such as Plato made the very basis of his philosophy, and such as you find in the sonnets of Michelangelo and Shakespeare."

In his Lambeth essay of December 2007, James Jones, the Bishop of Liverpool, drew particular attention to the "emotional, spiritual, and even physical" friendship between David and Jonathan:

There was between them a deep emotional bond that left David grief-stricken when Jonathan died. But not only were they emotionally bound to each other they expressed their love physically. Jonathan stripped off his clothes and dressed David in his own robe and armour. With the candour of the Eastern World that exposes the reserve of Western culture they kissed each other and wept openly with each other. The fact that they were both married did not inhibit them in emotional and physical displays of love for each other. This intimate relationship was sealed before God. It was not just a spiritual bond it became covenantal for “Jonathan made a covenant with David, because he loved him as his own soul” (1 Samuel 18:3). Here is the Bible bearing witness to love between two people of the same gender.

In 1993 a member of the Knesset in Israel, Yael Dayan, provoked controversy when she referred to David and Jonathan in a parliamentary debate in support of gay men and women in the Israeli military.

== Music ==
- Marc-Antoine Charpentier, Mors Saülis et Jonathae H.403, Oratorio for soloists, chorus, 2 treble instruments, and continuo 1680.
- Marc-Antoine Charpentier, David et Jonathas H.490, opéra in 5 acts for soloists, chorus, woodwinds, strings and continuo 1688.
- Giacomo Carissimi, David et Jonathas, dramatic motet for 5 voices, 2 violins and organ. (16..?)

== See also ==
- Achilles and Patroclus
- The Bible and homosexuality
- Judaism and homosexuality
- History of Christianity and homosexuality
- Romantic friendship – Very close; non-sexual relationship between friends
