= Zelzah =

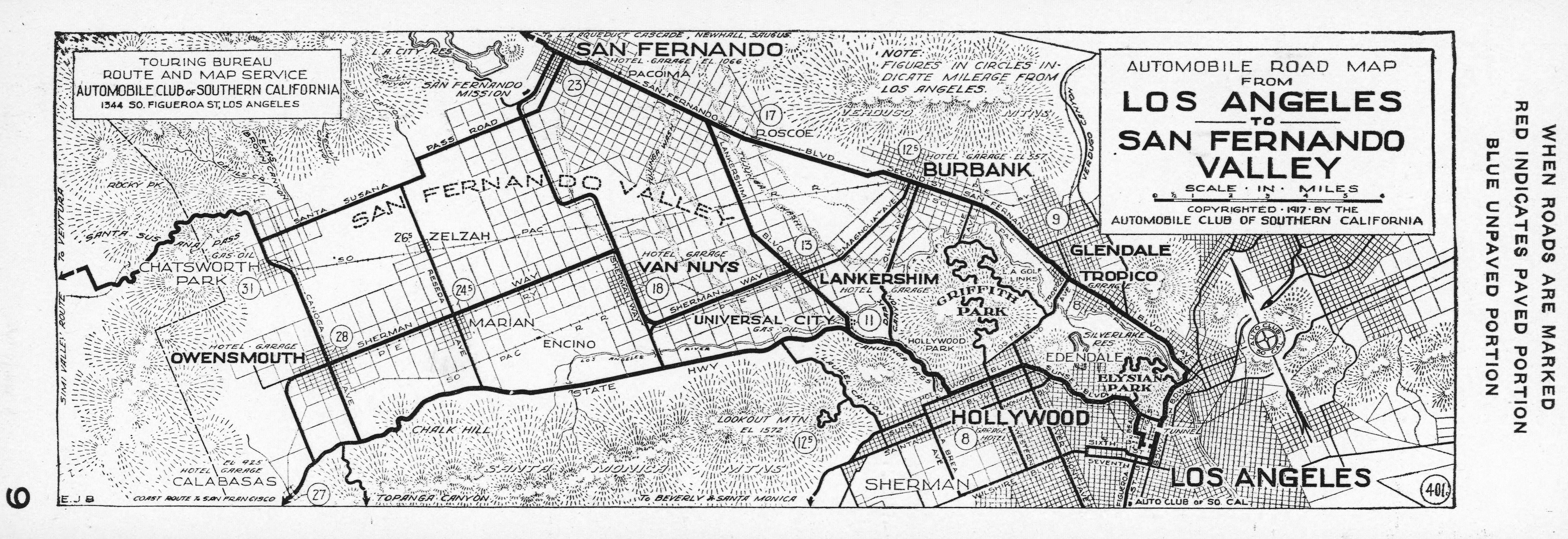
Zelzah, Los Angeles in 1917

Zelzah may refer to two:

- Zelzah (biblical place) an unidentified Bible location where King Saul was to meet three men
- The original name of Northridge, Los Angeles
