= Kish (Bible) =

Biblical figure

Kish (Hebrew: קיש Qīš) was the father of the first king of the Israelites, Saul. (1 Chronicles 12:1)

== Life ==
Kish was a Benjamite of the family of the Matrites (1 Samuel 9:1; 14:51; Acts 13:21; 1 Samuel 10:21), and there is some question over whether he was the brother or son of Ner (1 Chronicles 8:33 and 9:39; 1 Samuel 14:51). The question may be resolved by reading both Ner and Kish as sons of Abiel. According to the narrative of the appointment of Saul as king in 1 Samuel 9, Kish was the son of Abiel, son of Zeror, the son of Bechorath, the son of Aphiah and he kept donkeys. It was the loss of these donkeys which led Saul and a servant to journey in search of them and so to meet Samuel, Saul's anointer. "The possession of a drove of asses, and several servants, indicates that Kish was a man of some substance". The narrative later confirms that Kish was more concerned about the apparent disappearance of his son than about his loss of possessions.

== Residence ==
It appears that Kish resided at Gibeah. His tomb is said to be in Zela, in the region of Benjamin in modern-day Israel. (2 Samuel 21:14)

== Other biblical figures named Kish ==
"Kish" is also the name of one of Mordecai's ancestors. Many theologians, such as Antoine Augustin Calmet and Jacobus Tirinus, equate him with the above, but others, such as Ibn Ezra, argue that this is a different Kish.

There is also another Kish named in 1 Chronicles 23:22.

== See also ==
- Kish (Sumer)
- Qays
