= Honor suicide (disambiguation) =

Honor suicide can mean:

- Honor suicide, a form of suicide motivated by personal honor
- Forced suicide, a form of honor killing in which the victim is pressured into committing suicide
