= Adriel =

Person mentioned in the Bible

- Spouse: Merab
- Father: Barzilai the Meholathite

Adriel (Hebrew: עדריאל) (Aramaic: ܥܕܪܝܐܝܠ) (literally עדר (flock) י (of) אל (El)) was a person mentioned in the Bible. Adriel was a nobleman in the ancient kingdom of Israel.

The name Adriel is translated from the Hebrew word עַדְרִיאֵל (adriel [ˤadriˀeːl']), which means "flock of God". עַדְרִיאֵל comes from two Hebrew words: עֵ֫דֶר (eder [ˀeː'dɛr]) and אֵל (el [ˀeːl']). עֵ֫דֶר (eder [ˀeː'dɛr]) means "flock" and comes from another Hebrew word - עָדַר (adar [ɑʷdar']) - that means "to dig" or "to arrange". אֵל (el [ˀeːl']) means "God". Adriel was the son of Barzillai the Meholathite. According to 1 Samuel 18:19, Saul married his daughter Merab to Adriel.

However, 2 Samuel 21:653 in the Masoretic Text, records that Michal, another daughter of Saul "brought up" [R.V. "bare"] five sons with Adriel.

The claim that Michal "brought up" these five sons has been taken to mean either that she treated them as if she had been their own mother, or that for "Michal" we should read "Merab" in 2 Samuel 21:8, as in 1 Sam. 18:19.

Due to that later discrepancy that states Michal as the wife of Adriel, instead of Merab as first said in 1st Samuel, many scholars believe this to be an ancient copyist's error that should have read Merab in 2 Samuel 21:8.
