= Ahimaaz (disambiguation) =

Ahimaaz was son and successor of Zadok in the office of high priest. ( 1 Chronicles 6:8 1 Chronicles 6:53 )

Ahimaaz may also refer to:

- Ahimaaz ben Paltiel (1017–1060), medieval chronicler
- Ahimaaz, father-in-law of Saul
