= Martti Nissinen =

Finnish theologian (born 1959)

Martti Heikki Nissinen
- Born: April 22, 1959 (age 67); Kuopio
- Scientific career
- Fields: Old Testament, Assyriology
- Workplaces: University of Helsinki

Martti Heikki Nissinen (born April 22, 1959 in Kuopio) is a Finnish theologian, serving since 2007 as Professor of Old Testament studies in the Faculty of Theology at the University of Helsinki. He is known as an expert of the prophetic phenomenon in the Hebrew Bible and the ancient Near East, but his research interests include also gender issues (love poetry, homoeroticism, masculinity) in the ancient Eastern Mediterranean. He has written and edited several books and a significant number of articles on topics related to prophecy, gender, and history of ancient Near Eastern religion.

Nissinen received his Th.D. from the University of Helsinki in 1992, after which he held several research and teaching positions at this institution, such as Assistant Professor of Old Testament Studies (1985–1994) and as an Academy Research Fellow of the Academy of Finland (1994–2002). From 2002 to 2007, he served as Professor of Bible and the Ancient Near East. He was a member of the Institute for Advanced Study in Princeton, N.J. in 2008–2009 and in 2016 and a visitor in 2011. In 2014–2019, Nissinen was the director of the Academy of Finland Centre of Excellence in Changes in Sacred Texts and Traditions (CSTT), an interdisciplinary research centre that focuses on a more comprehensive understanding of the emergence and influence of the Hebrew Bible/Old Testament within the multicultural milieu of the ancient Near East.

== Awards and honors ==
Nissinen is a member of the Finnish Academy of Science and Letters and an honorary member of the Society for Old Testament Study. He is also the Chairman of the Foundation for the Finnish Institute in the Middle East and the Inspector of the Savonian Student Nation.

== Books ==
=== In English ===
- (1998) Homoeroticism in the Biblical World: A Historical Perspective, Minneapolis, MN: Augsburg Fortress; ISBN 0-8006-2985-X.
- (1998) References to Prophecy in Neo-Assyrian Sources, State archives of Assyria studies 7, Helsinki; ISBN 951-45-8079-6.
- (2000) Prophecy in its Ancient Near Eastern Context: Mesopotamian, Biblical, and Arabian Perspectives (ed. Martti Nissinen), SBL Symposium Series 13, Atlanta, GA: Society of Biblical Literature; ISBN 0-88414-026-1.
- (2008) Houses Full of All Good Things: Essays in Memory of Timo Veijola (eds. Juha Pakkala & Martti Nissinen), Helsinki: Finnish Exegetical Society/Göttingen: Vandenhoeck & Ruprecht; ISBN 978-951-9217-50-5, 978-3-525-53607-0.
- (2008) Sacred Marriages: The Divine-Human Sexual Metaphor from Sumer to Early Christianity (eds. Martti Nissinen & Risto Uro), Winona Lake, IN: Eisenbrauns; ISBN 1-57506-118-X.
- (2009) Images and prophecy in the ancient Eastern Mediterranean (ed. Martti Nissinen & Charles E. Carter), Forschungen zur Religion und Literatur des Alten und Neuen Testaments 233, Göttingen: Vandenhoeck & Ruprecht; ISBN 978-352-553097-9.
- (2011) Constructs of Prophecy in the Former and Latter Prophets and Other Texts (eds. Lester E. Grabbe & Martti Nissinen), Ancient Near Eastern Monographs 4, Atlanta, GA: Society of Biblical Literature; ISBN 978-158-983600-6.
- (2012) Congress volume Helsinki 2010 (ed. Martti Nissinen), Supplements to Vetus Testamentum 148, Leiden: Brill; ISBN 978-900-420514-7.
- (2017) Ancient Prophecy: Near Eastern, Greek, and Biblical Perspectives, Oxford: Oxford University Press; ISBN 9780198808558.
- (2019) Prophets and Prophecy in the Ancient Near East, Second Edition, Atlanta, GA: SBL Press; ISBN 9780884143406.
- (2019) Prophetic Divination: Essays in Ancient Near Eastern Prophecy, Berlin: De Gruyter; ISBN 9783110466546.

=== In German ===
- (1991) Prophetie, Redaktion und Fortschreibung im Hoseabuch: Studien zum Werdegang eines Prophetenbuches im Lichte von Hos 4 und 11, Alter Orient und Altes Testament 231, Kevelaer: Butzon & Bercker; ISBN 3-7666-9744-7.
- (2003) Propheten in Mari, Assyrien und Israel (eds. Matthias Köckert & Martti Nissinen), Forschungen zur Religion und Literatur des Alten und Neuen Testaments 201, Göttingen: Vandenhoeck & Ruprecht; ISBN 3-525-53885-5.

=== In Finnish ===
- (1989) Vanhan testamentin synty (Rudolf Smend, Finnish ed. Martti Nissinen), Helsinki: Yliopistopaino; ISBN 951-570-052-3.
- (1994) Homoerotiikka Raamatun maailmassa, Helsinki: Yliopistopaino; ISBN 951-570-194-5.
- (2003) Johdatus Raamattuun (Kari Kuula, Martti Nissinen & Wille Riekkinen), Helsinki: Kirjapaja; ISBN 951-625-930-8.
- (2003) Synti vai siunaus? Homoseksuaalit, kirkko ja yhteiskunta (eds. Martti Nissinen & Liisa Tuovinen), Helsinki: Kirjapaja; ISBN 951-625-963-4.
- (2004) Kirkkomusiikki (eds. Juhani Haapasalo, Liisa Lauerma, Martti Nissinen & Pekka Suikkanen), Helsinki: Edita; ISBN 951-373-915-5.
- (2008) Johdatus Raamattuun 2. tarkistettu ja korjattu painos (Kari Kuula, Martti Nissinen, Wille Riekkinen), Helsinki: Kirjapaja; ISBN 978-951-607-648-8.
- (2018) Kiveen hakattu? Pyhät tekstit ja perinteet muutoksessa (eds. Martti Nissinen & Leena Vähäkylä), Helsinki: Gaudeamus; ISBN 9789524954860.
