= Honor suicide =

Aspect of suicide

Honor suicide is a type of suicide whereby a person kills themself to escape the shame of an action they consider immoral or dishonorable, such as having had extra-marital sexual affairs, partaking in a scandal, or suffering defeat in battle. It is distinguished from regular suicide in that the subject is actively deciding to either privately or publicly kill themself for the sake of restoring or protecting honor. Some honor suicides are a matter of personal choice and are devoid of any cultural context. For example, honor suicides have been committed by military figures when faced with defeat, such as Saul, Mark Antony, Władysław Raginis, Yoshitsugu Saito, Jozef Gabčík, Hans Langsdorff, and Emperor Theodore (Tewodros II) of Ethiopia.

== History in Japan ==
Honor suicide has deep roots historically in Japanese society, most famously in the form of harakiri (also known as seppuku). The 1962 film Harakiri directed by Masaki Kobayashi gives a direct and coherent portrayal of the act, involving ritualistic suicide by disembowelment. This would be voluntary and most often carried out by samurai who had failed to follow proper conduct, considering death to be preferable to dishonor. Harakiri was viewed as a form of self-sacrifice, not a punishment or penalty forced on a servant by their lord.

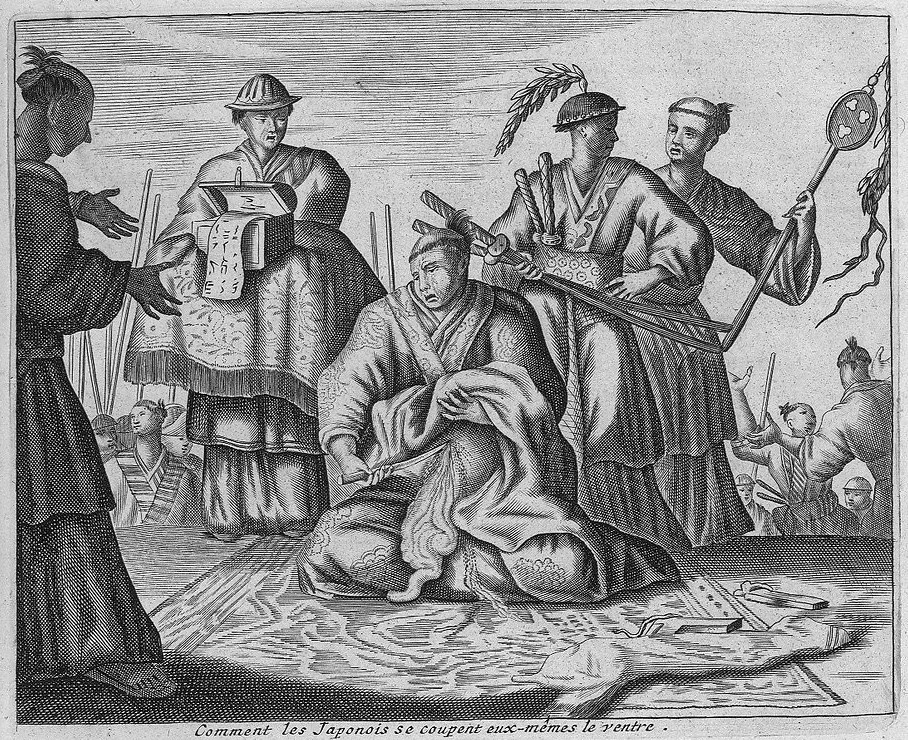
European depiction of harakiri

Despite this view, the requirement to commit harakiri was used as a capital punishment in old Japan, applied exclusively to persons of high rank and position, and being referred to as "grant of death" in this context. It was only in 1873 that the "Self-Punishment Act" was abolished, replaced by life imprisonment to be applied to a corresponding case, and hence harakiri disappeared as a form of death penalty.

During the Second World War, some officers in Imperial Japan were reported to have committed harakiri, such as Takijiro Onishi, the admiral who devised the kamikaze tactic. The most notable example of harakiri in modern times is that of Yukio Mishima, a hardline nationalist who felt the Japanese military and society had become weak since the end of World War II. Mishima committed Harakiri in 1970 after forcing his way into the Japanese Self-Defense Force’s headquarters, having failed to persuade them into a coup to restore the emperor's political power.

In the aftermath of the fatal crash of Japan Airlines Flight 123, two Japan Airlines personnel killed themselves, including an engineer who had personally inspected the plane during a prior incident seven years earlier.

In Japan, there is a tradition of death, instead of shame, targeting those who fail to meet family or community expectations, extending to the elderly who may consider themselves burdensome; Japan has one of the highest suicide rates in the world.

== In the United States ==
Suicide rates are the highest in the Southern and Western United States, and some scholars have suggested this to be consistent with a culture of honor. Osterman and Brown demonstrated that US "honor states" had higher rates of suicide than non-honor states.

== Honor suicide and gender ==
The differing cultural demands placed upon men and women by honor result in risk of suicide when individuals are unable to meet their specific gender role expectations. Men are expected to act as the protectors and providers in society, whereas women are expected to portray images of chastity, loyalty, devotion to family, and modesty. In both cases, old age is seen as the factor most salient in disrupting an individual's ability to meet these expectations. Fulfillment of expectations of manhood become increasingly difficult as one ages, and subsequent awareness of such difficulty can result in alienation and a feeling of burden on one's family and community. Similarly for women, an inability to meet their set of role expectations can put them at risk of rejection and alienation, with the aging process potentially undermining their perceived attractiveness. Women from honor cultures may hence view aging as a detriment to their social value, particularly in male-dominated societies.

== See also ==
- Honor killing
- Forced suicide
- Seppuku
- Jauhar
