= David and Jonathan (Rembrandt) =

1642 painting by Rembrandt

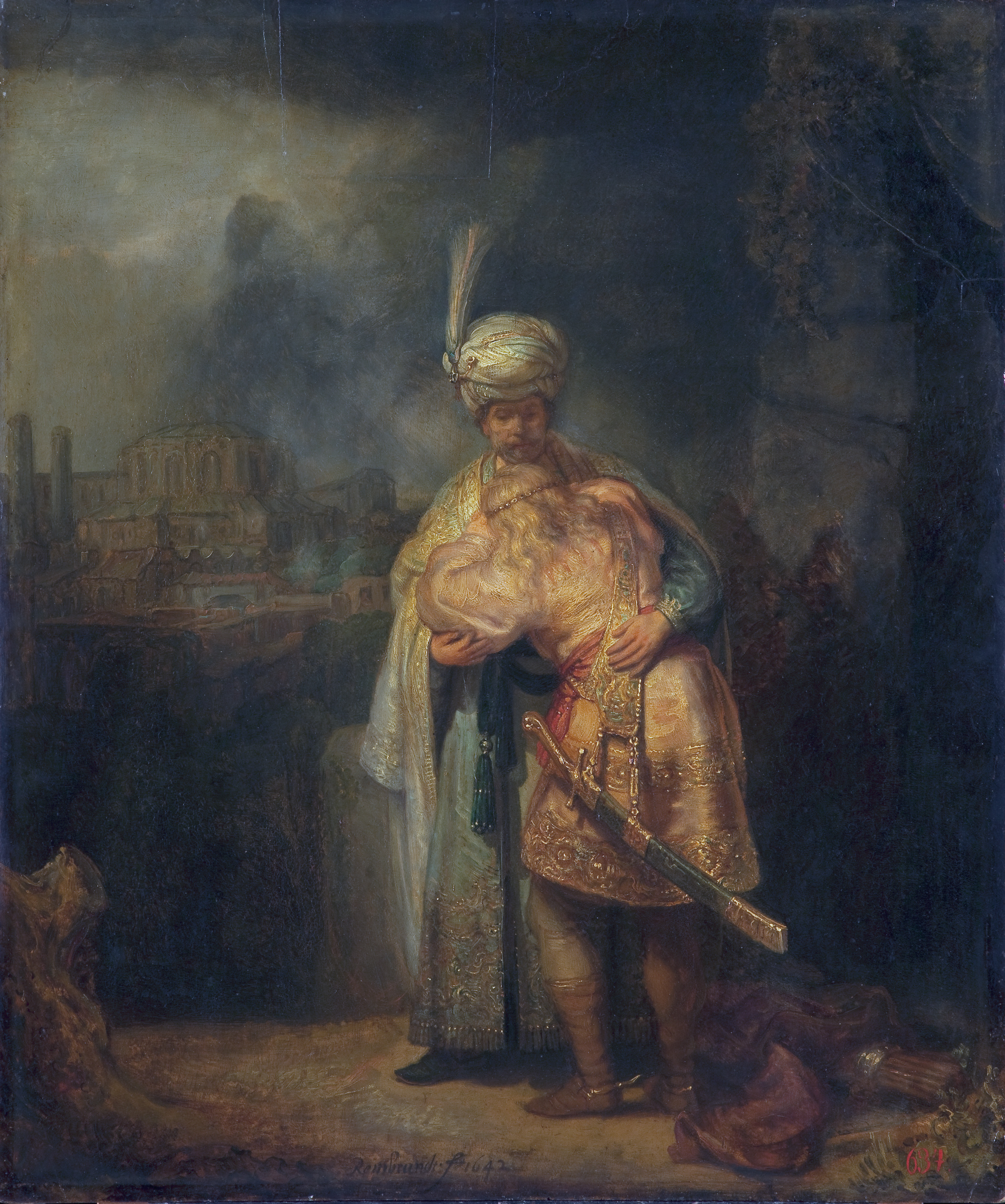
Rembrandt van Rijn, David and Jonathan, 1642; 73 × 61.5 cm. Hermitage Museum, Saint Petersburg

David and Jonathan is a painting by the Dutch painter Rembrandt, made in 1642, now in the collection of the Hermitage Museum in Saint Petersburg, Russia. Painted on oak, it is one of the works, together with the Hellenistic sculpture acquired in 1850, The Venus de Taurida, with which the Hermitage began their collection in 1882.

The subject is taken from the First Book of Samuel (20: 35–42). David was a close friend of Jonathan, the son of King Saul. Saul suspected David of aspiring to the throne of Israel. Saul thus planned to kill David, but when Jonathan learned of his father's intention, he warned David of the danger. Jonathan advised him to run away, though David took shelter by the stone Ezel, where their last meeting took place. Jerusalem is portrayed gleaming in the left background, with a quiver of arrows at David's feet being interpreted as those weapons given David by Jonathan after the victory over Goliath (1 Samuel 18:1-4).

Rembrandt portrays Jonathan holding David to his chest as the latter weeps uncontrollably: "And Jonathan made David swear again by his love for him, for he loved him as he loved his own soul." (1 Samuel 20:17) The young David cannot contain his grief. Jonathan, more mature in years, keeps back the tears, although his face expresses deep sorrow. Themes of love and suffering lie at the heart of the biblical story captured in the painting. Rembrandt painted the picture soon after the death of his beloved wife Saskia, and perhaps its subject is associated with his own feelings.

The Hermitage contains other works by Rembrandt such as Flora (1634), The Descent of the Cross (1634), The Sacrifice of Isaac (1635), The Holy Family with Angels (1645), and The Return of the Prodigal Son (1668–1669).

== See also ==
- David and Jonathan, about the Biblical story
- List of paintings by Rembrandt
