= Matrites (family) =

Ancient Israelite family from the Tribe of Benjamin

The Matrites (Hebrew: מַּטְרִי Maṭrī) were one of several ancient Israelite clans from the Tribe of Benjamin. They were the clan of the family of King Saul. They are only mentioned once in the Bible: When the Israelites chose their first king, the lot fell upon the clan of Matri. Nothing else is known for certain about them. Later midrashic sources which trace Mordechai's full lineage all the way to Saul and from him to Benjamin do not include anyone by the name of Matar or Matri. It is possible that this reflects a Jewish tradition that held that the family of Saul had been adopted into that clan, despite not being direct descendants of the progenitor and namesake of the clan. Zeev Ehrlich suggested that the clan had dwelled in what is now Khirbet Al-Matari, because that site is near Chephirah, which was one of the cities of Gibeonites within the territory of Benjamin and it is known that the family of Saul had ties with them.

Benjaminites in the southern kingdom of Judah were assimilated by the more powerful tribe of Judah and gradually lost their identity.
