= Zelah, Judea =

Ancient city in Judea

Zelah or Zela (Biblical Hebrew: צֵלָע) was an unidentified place in the territory of the Tribe of Benjamin, ancient Judea, known as the burial place of King Saul, his father Kish and his son Jonathan, with the 7 grandsons of Saul hung by the Gibeonites. Saul and Jonathan died during the Battle of Gilboa, and 2 Samuel 21:13 refers to King David authorising their bones to be moved to Kish's grave to join the bodies of the 7 grandsons killed in retribution for Saul's slaughter of Gibeonites. It may be the Zilu of the Amarna letters.
