= Michal =

Hebrew Bible character

Michal מִיכַל
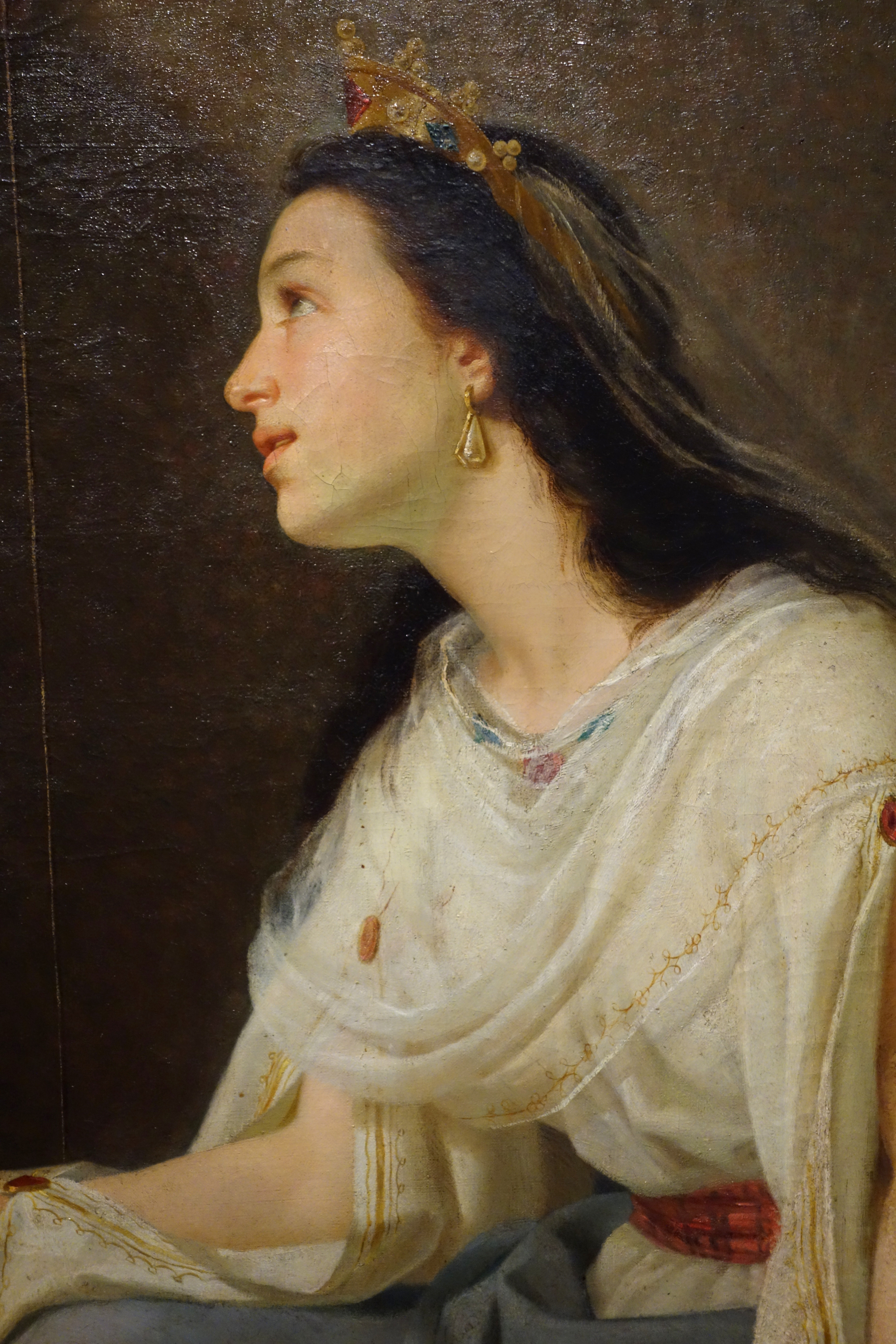
- Part of David and Michal (1865) by Virginio Grana
- Reign: between 10th century BC and 9th century BC
- Spouse: 2 husbands: David; Palti, son of Laish
- Father: Saul

Michal (/mɪˈxɑːl/; Hebrew: מִיכַל, [miˈχal]; Greek: Μιχάλ) was, according to the Books of Samuel, a princess of the United Kingdom of Israel. The younger daughter of King Saul, she was the first wife of David, who later became king: first of Judah, then of all Israel, making her queen consort of Israel.

== In the Bible ==
1 Samuel 14:49 identifies Saul's elder daughter as Merab and younger daughter as Michal. Michal's story is recorded in the first Book of Samuel, where it is said in 1 Samuel 18:20 and 18:28 that Michal loved David. The narrative does not indicate whether this is reciprocated. After David's success in battle against the Philistine giant Goliath, Merab was given in marriage to Adriel.

Later, after Merab had married Adriel the Meholathite, Saul invited David to marry Michal. David replied, "I am a poor and lightly esteemed man", meaning that he was unable to provide a bride price. Saul then advised him that no bride price was required except for the foreskins of 100 Philistines. David took part in a further battle, killed 200 Philistines, and brought their foreskins to Saul as a double bride price.

In the biblical narrative, Michal chooses the welfare of David over the wishes of her father. When Saul's messengers search for David in order to kill him, Michal sends them away while pretending he was ill and laid up in bed. She lets David down through a window and hides teraphim in his bed as a ruse. J. Cheryl Exum points out that although she risked her life in helping him, after he leaves the court, he makes no attempt to contact her.

While David was hiding for his life, Saul gave Michal as a wife to Palti, son of Laish, and David took several other wives, including Abigail. Later, when David became king of Judah and Ish-bosheth (Michal's brother, and Saul's son) was king of Israel, David demanded her return to him in return for peace between them. Ish-bosheth complied, despite the public protests of Palti. Robert Alter observes that by stressing that he had paid the requested bride price, David makes a legal argument as a political calculation to reinforce his legitimacy as a member of the royal house. Alter notes the contrast between David's measured negotiations and Palti's public grief.

After Michal was returned to David, she criticised him for dancing in an undignified manner, as he brought the Ark of the Covenant to the newly captured Jerusalem in a religious procession. For this she is punished, according to Samuel, with not having children till the day she dies. Unlike Abigail and Bathsheba, Michal is not described as being beautiful, though Rabbinic tradition holds that she was of "entrancing beauty."

Michal is also briefly mentioned in 1 Chronicles 15:29.

== Legality of second marriage ==
These events have raised moral issues within Judaism, especially in the context of the prohibition in Deuteronomy 24:1–4. On the one hand, some argue that it is prohibited to re-establish a marriage with a previous spouse who has subsequently remarried. On the other hand, other commentators explain that David had not divorced Michal at this point in time, but rather Saul acted to break their marriage by marrying her off to another without David's consent. On that view, they were not technically divorced as David had not issued a writ of divorcement according to biblical law.

=== Offspring ===
Some have argued that it is unclear whether Michal died barren and childless, as stated in 2 Samuel 6:23, or had children, as described in most manuscripts of 2 Samuel 21:8, which mention "the five sons of Michal the daughter of Saul." The justification for the NIV's textual rendering (see also ESV, NASB, and NRSV) is surely found in the completion of the clause, which states "...whom she had borne to Adriel son of Barzillai the Meholathite." That it was Merab who married Adriel is attested without ambiguity (1 Samuel 18:19); it is extraordinarily difficult to argue that Michal might have borne five sons to her sister's husband.

Gill attempted to resolve the conundrum presented by many Hebrew manuscripts' use of Michal, rather than Merab, by translating 2 Samuel 21:8 as "the five sons of Michal the daughter of Saul, whom she brought up for Adriel the son of Barzillai the Meholathite". Now, Merab, Michal's older sister, was the wife of Adriel (1 Samuel 18:19). According to Gill, these five sons were not born to Michal but were brought up or educated by her after Merab perhaps had died; i.e., Merab brought them forth, and Michal brought them up. However, the Hebrew word, ילדה, which Gill understands to mean "brought up," everywhere else means "gave birth to."

== Michal in poetry and literature ==
- In 1707, Georg Christian Lehms published in Hanover the novel Die unglückselige Princessin Michal und der verfolgte David ('The hapless Princess Michal and David pursued'), based on the Biblical story.
- In her poem "Michal", in her book Flowers of Perhaps, the Israeli poet Ra'hel Bluwstein draws a parallel between the speaker and Michal: "Like you I am sad, O Michal ... and like you doomed to love a man whom I despise."
- Michal is a featured character in the novel The Secret Book of Kings, by Yochi Brandes.
- Michal is "shown twice" in the Shaker hymn "Come Life, Shaker Life" by Issachar Bates. It refers to the incident of David dancing before the Ark, to upbraid critics of Shaker religious dancing.

== Use as a name ==
"Michal" is a very common female first name in contemporary Israel, but the given name is used also for men.

"Micol" is an Italian variant of the given name.

Although possessing an identical or almost identical spelling when using the Latin alphabet, the Czech and Slovak language "Michal" and the Polish language "Michał" (popular male given names) are the local forms of "Michael" rather than of "Michal". This can be compared to French spelling "Michel", which is also a local form of "Michael". In Spanish, the spelling is Mical.
