= Jonathan (1 Samuel) =

Biblical figure; eldest son of the Israelite king Saul

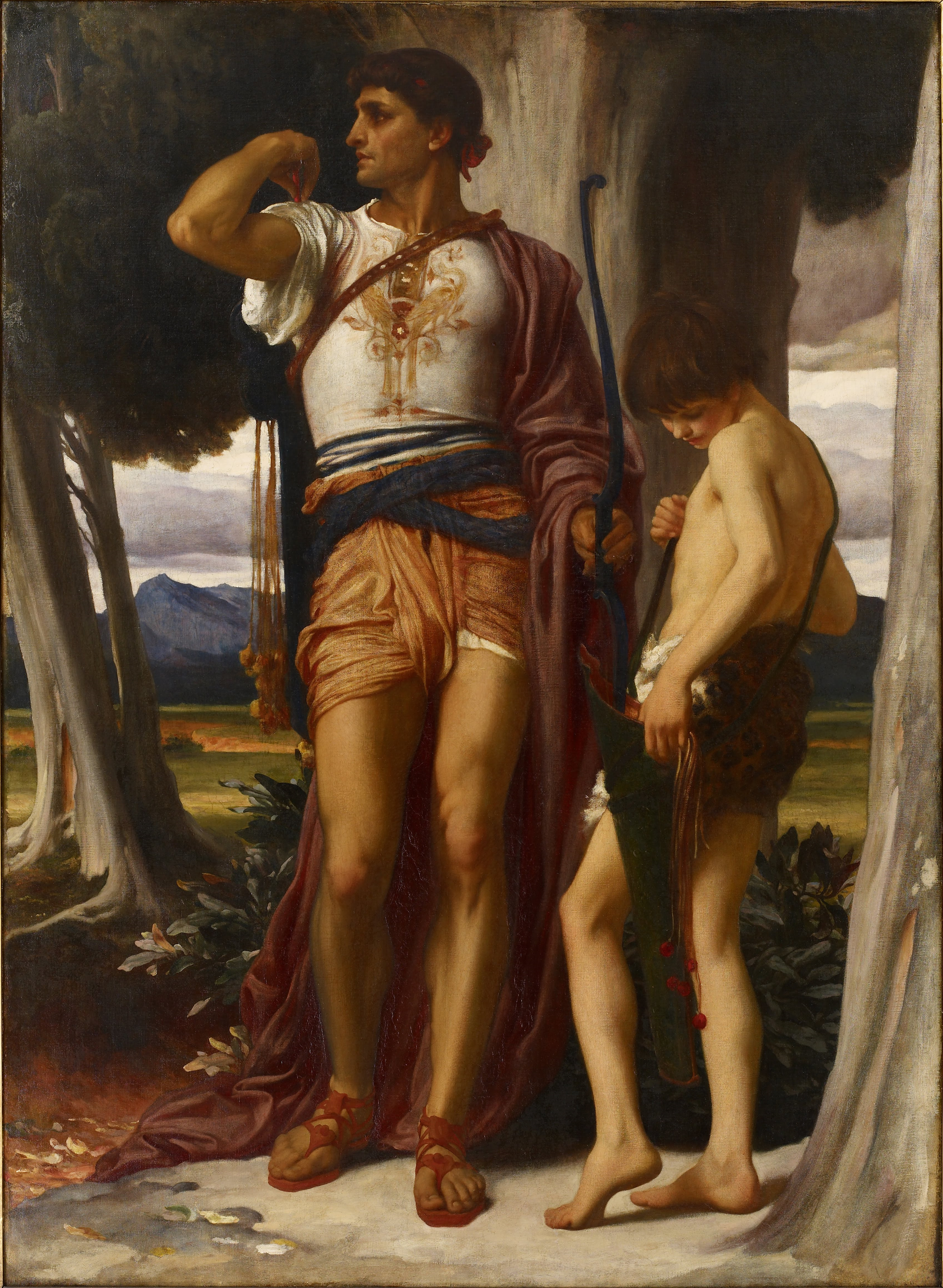
- Jonathan shooting three arrows to warn David

Prince of Israel and King David's friend
- Venerated in: Roman Catholic Church, Eastern Orthodox Church
- Feast: December 29
- Attributes: Bow and Arrow

Jonathan (Hebrew: יְהוֹנָתָן Yəhōnāṯān or יוֹנָתָן Yōnāṯān; "YHWH has gifted") is a figure in the Book of Samuel of the Hebrew Bible. In the biblical narrative, he is the eldest son of King Saul of the Kingdom of Israel, and a close friend of David. He is described as having great strength and swiftness (2 Samuel 1:23) and excelling in archery (1 Samuel 20:20, 2 Samuel 1:22) and slinging (1 Chronicles 12:2).

== Conflicts with Saul ==
Jonathan first appears in the biblical narrative as the victor of Geba, a Philistine stronghold (1 Samuel 13). In the following chapter he carries out a lone and secret attack on another Philistine garrison, demonstrating his "prowess and courage as a warrior." However, he eats honey without knowing that his father had said, "Cursed be any man who eats food before evening comes" (1 Samuel 14:24). When he learns of his father's oath, Jonathan disagrees with the wisdom of it, as it requires the soldiers to pursue the enemy although weak from fasting. Saul decides to put Jonathan to death for breaking the ban, but relents when the soldiers protest (1 Samuel 14:45).

The story of David and Jonathan is introduced in Samuel 1 (18:1), where it says that "Jonathan became one in spirit with David, and he loved him as himself". The feeling is expressed before the men exchanged a single word in an interaction that has been described as philia "Greek - friendship."

Saul suspects that Jonathan is colluding with David, who he believes is conspiring to overthrow him. Saul insults Jonathan calling him the "... son of a perverse and rebellious woman!" in 1 Samuel 20:30. (Note: While this is an "idiom of insult directed at Jonathan", some scholars see in this verse support for the theory that Ahinoam, the wife of Saul, was the same Ahinoam who is described as the second wife of David. Jon Levenson and Baruch Halpern suggest that the phrase "to the shame of your mother's nakedness" suggests "David's theft of Saul's wife", but such an event is never described in the Bible and one Bible scholar, Diana V. Edelman, has ruled it as unlikely: "Such a presumption would require David to have run off with the queen mother while Saul was still on the throne, which seems unlikely. In view of the possession of the royal harem as a claim to royal legitimacy, Nathan’s comment can be related to David’s eventual possession of Saul’s wives after he ascended the throne in the wake of Eshbaal’s death ..." The taking of Saul's wives by David had not yet taken place, and when it did happen was not theft – at that point in the narrative, Saul and Jonathan were dead, and the royal harem were all widows.) Saul even goes so far as to attempt to kill Jonathan by throwing a javelin at him during a fit of paranoid rage. But, before this event happened, all Jonathan did was ask his father what did David do to him so that he would be put to death? (1 Sam. 20:32-33), which suggests David had never wronged Saul.

The last meeting between Jonathan and David would take place in a forest of Ziph at Horesh, during Saul's pursuit of David. There, the two would make a covenant before the Lord before going their separate ways.

== Death ==
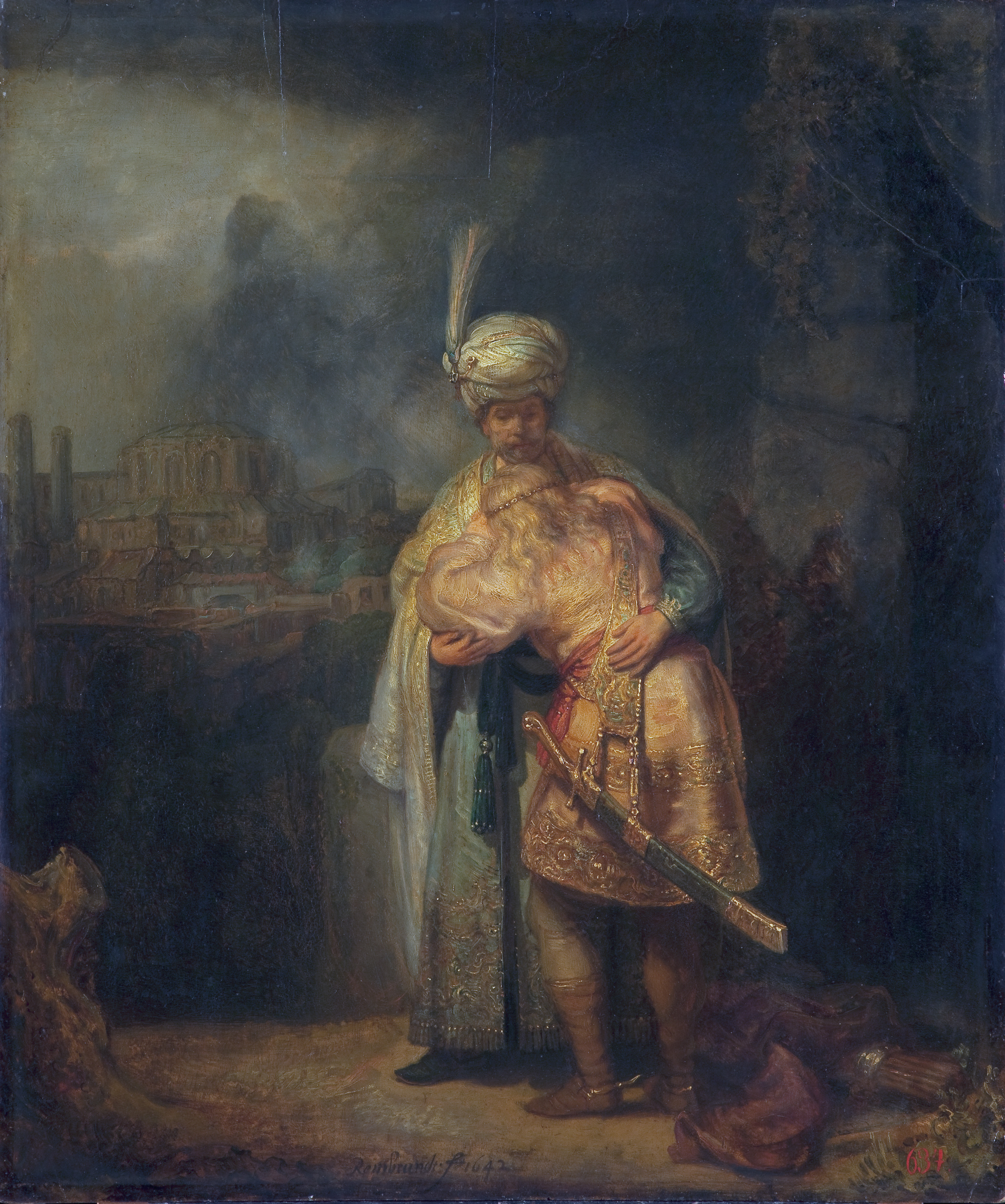
David and Jonathan, 1642, by the studio or a follower of Rembrandt. Jonathan is the figure in the turban.

Jonathan died at the battle of Mount Gilboa along with his father and brothers (1 Samuel 31). His bones were buried first at Jabesh-gilead, (1 Samuel 31:13) but were later removed with those of his father and moved to Zelah. Jonathan was the father of Mephibosheth, to whom David showed special kindness for Jonathan's sake (2 Samuel 9).

== Cultural symbolism ==
Jonathan has typically been portrayed as a "model of loyalty to truth and friendship", in the words of T. H. Jones.
