= Saul =

Biblical figure and Israelite monarch

Saul שָׁאוּל
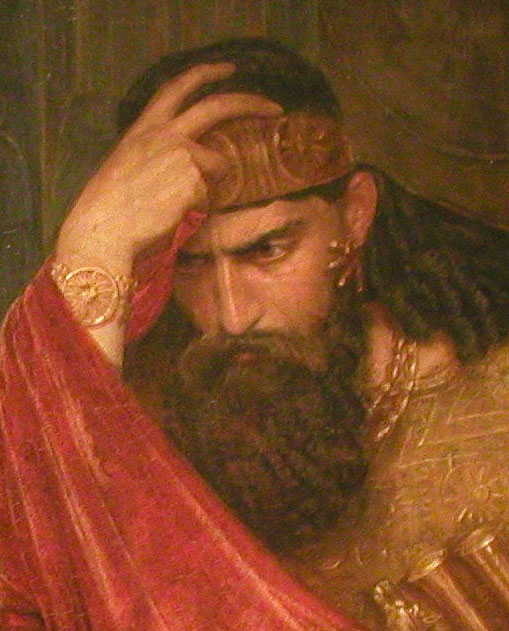
- Saul depicted in a detail from an 1878 oil painting by Ernst Josephson

King of Israel
- Reign: c. 1050–1047 BC – c. 1010 BC
- Successor: Ish-bosheth
- Died: Mount Gilboa
- Spouses: Ahinoam; Rizpah
- Issue: Ish-bosheth; Jonathan; Abinadab; Melchishua; Merab; Michal; Armoni; Mephibosheth
Names
- Saul ben Kish (שאול בן קיש)
- House: House of Saul
- Father: Kish

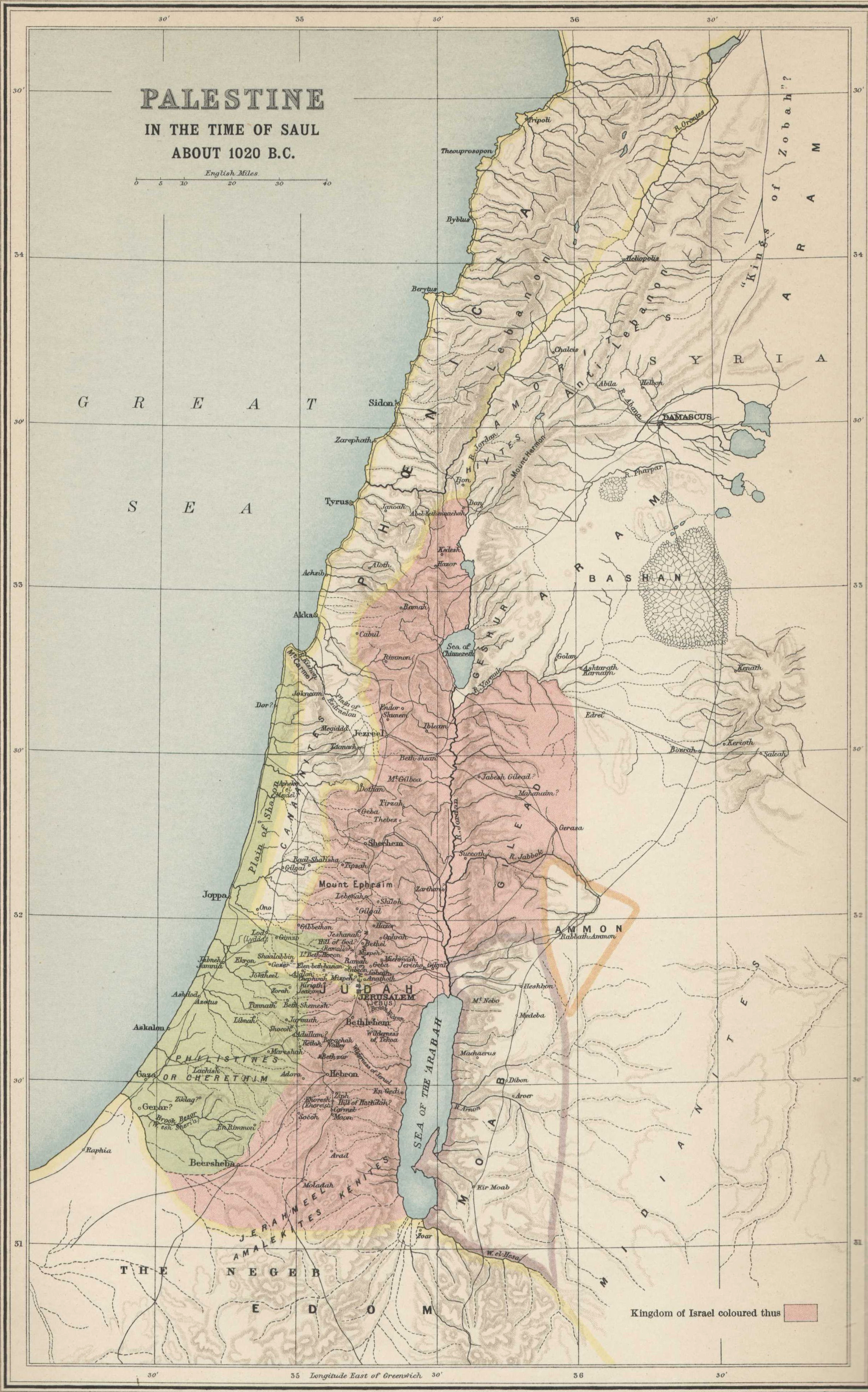
The Kingdom of Saul, according to the biblical account

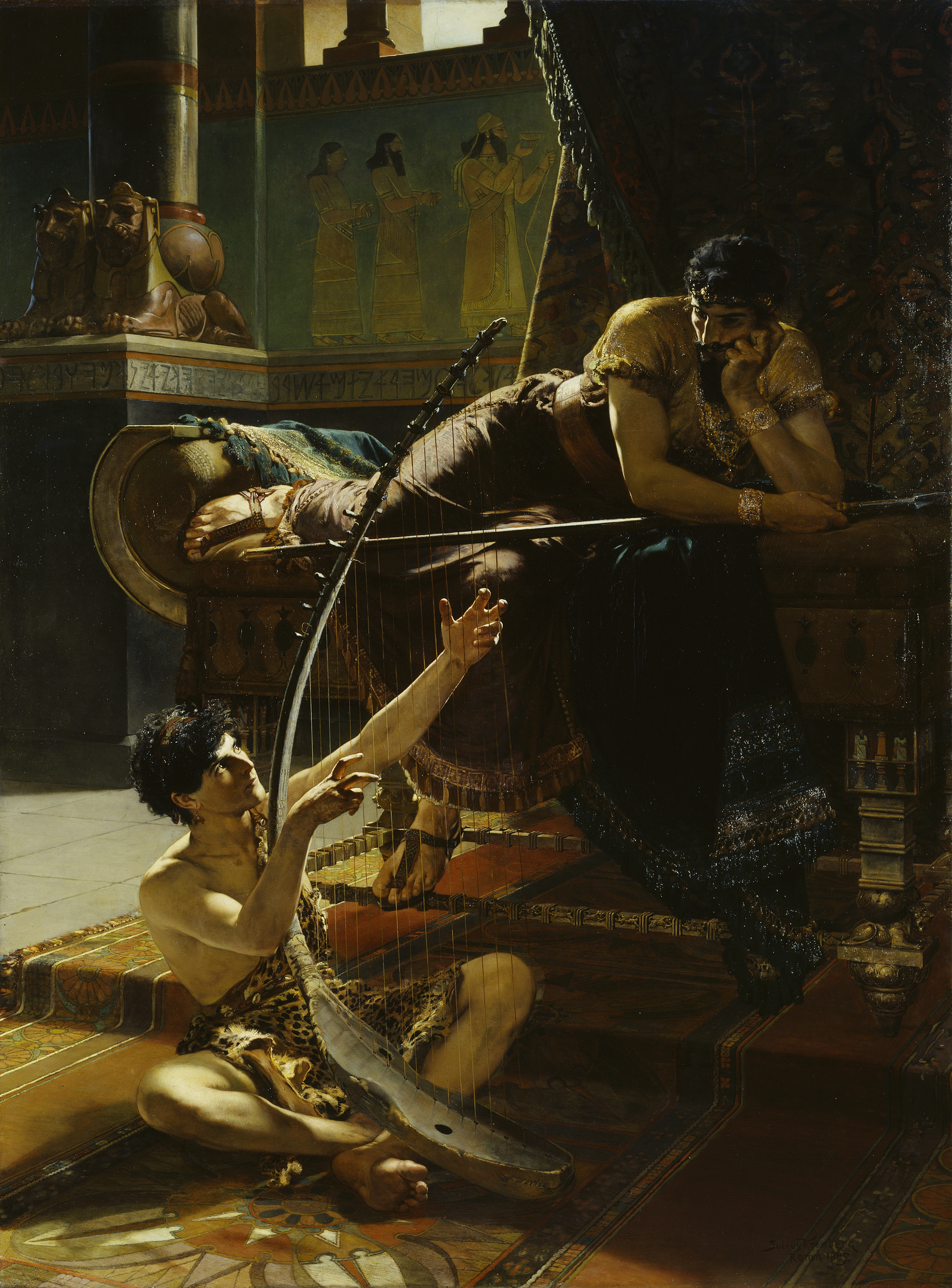
David and Saul, by Julius Kronberg, 1885

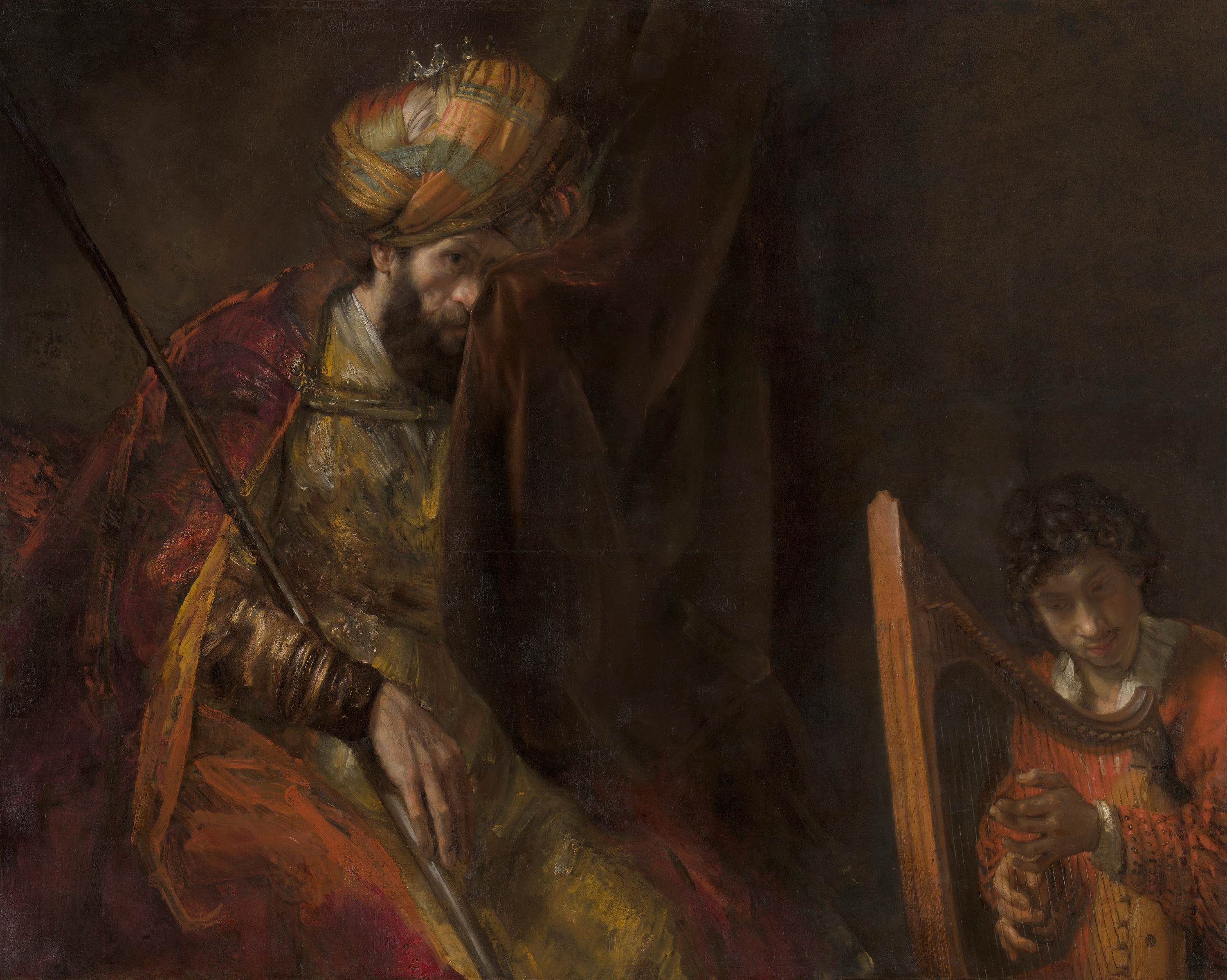
David Plays the Harp for Saul, by Rembrandt van Rijn, c. 1650

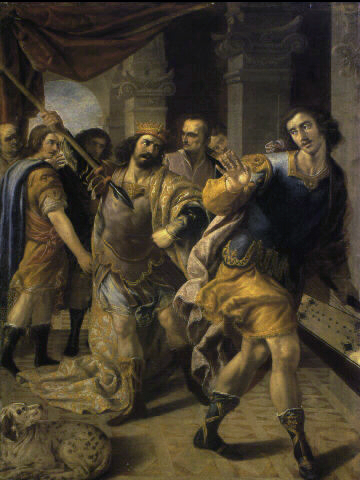
Saul threatening David, by José Leonardo, c. 1640s

Saul (/sɔːl/; Hebrew: שָׁאוּל, Šāʾūl; transl. "asked/prayed for"; Greek: Σαούλ, Saoúl) was a monarch of ancient Israel and Judah and the first king of the United Monarchy according to the Hebrew Bible. His reign, traditionally placed in the late eleventh century BC, marked the transition of the Israelites from a scattered tribal society ruled by various judges to organized statehood.

The historicity of Saul and the United Kingdom of Israel is debated, as what is known of both comes largely from the Hebrew Bible. According to the text, he was anointed as king of the Israelites by Samuel, and reigned from Gibeah. Saul is said to have committed suicide when he fell on his sword during a battle with the Philistines at Mount Gilboa, in which three of his sons were also killed. Saul's son Ish-bosheth succeeded him to the throne, reigning for only two years before being murdered by his own military leaders. Saul's son-in-law David then became king.

The biblical narrative of Saul's rise to kingship and his death contains several textual inconsistencies and plays on words that scholars have discussed. These issues include conflicting accounts of Saul's anointing and death, changes in the portrayal of Saul from positive to negative following David's introduction, and etymological discrepancies in the birth narrative of Samuel, which some scholars believe originally described Saul's birth.

== Biblical account ==
The biblical accounts of Saul's life are found in the Books of Samuel:

=== House of King Saul ===
According to the Hebrew text of the Bible, Saul reigned for two years, but Biblical scholars generally agree that the text is faulty and that a reign of 20 or 22 years is more probable. In the New Testament book of Acts 13:21, the Apostle Paul indicates that Saul's reign lasted for forty years.

According to the Hebrew Bible, Saul was the son of Kish, of the family of the Matrites, and a member of the tribe of Benjamin, one of the twelve Tribes of Israel. It appears that he came from Gibeah.

Saul married Ahinoam, daughter of Ahimaaz, with whom he sired at least five sons (Jonathan, Abinadab, Malchishua, Ishvi and Ish-bosheth) and two daughters (Merab and Michal).

Saul also had a concubine named Rizpah, daughter of Aiah, who bore him two sons, Armoni and Mephibosheth.

Saul died at the Battle of Mount Gilboa, and was buried in Zelah, in the region of Benjamin. Three of Saul's sons – Jonathan, Abinadab, and Malchishua – died with him at Mount Gilboa. His surviving son Ish-bosheth became king of Israel, at the age of forty. At David's request, Abner had Michal returned to David. Ish-bosheth reigned for two years, but after the death of Abner, was killed by two of his own captains.

During a famine, God told King David that the famine happened because of how Saul treated the Gibeonites. The Gibeonites told David that only the death of seven sons of Saul would compensate them for losing their livelihood after the priests at Nob were killed under Saul's orders. David then granted the Gibeonites the jurisdiction to individually execute Saul's surviving two sons and five of Saul's grandsons (the sons of Merab and Adriel). The Gibeonites killed all seven, and hung up their bodies at the sanctuary at Gibeah. For five months their bodies were hung out in the elements, and the grieving Rizpah guarded them from being eaten by the beasts and birds of prey. Finally, David had the bodies taken down and buried in the family grave at Zelah with the remains of Saul and their half-brother Jonathan. Michal was childless.

The only male descendant of Saul to survive was Mephibosheth, Jonathan's lame son, who was five years old at the time of his father's and grandfather's deaths. In time, he came under the protection of David. Mephibosheth had a young son, Micah, who had four sons and descendants named until the ninth generation.

=== Anointed as king ===
The First Book of Samuel gives three accounts of Saul's rise to the throne in three successive chapters:

- Saul was sent with a servant to look for his father's strayed donkeys. Leaving his home at Gibeah, they eventually arrived at the district of Zuph, at which point Saul suggested abandoning their search. Saul's servant told him that they happened to be near the town of Ramah, where a famous seer did dwell, and suggested that they should consult him first. The seer (later identified by the text as Samuel) offered hospitality to Saul and later anointed him in private.
- A popular movement having arisen to establish a centralized monarchy like other nations, Samuel assembled the people at Mizpah in Benjamin to appoint a king, fulfilling his previous promise to do so. Samuel organised the people by tribe and by clan. Using the Urim and Thummim, he selects the tribe of Benjamin, from within the tribe selecting the clan of Matri, and from them selecting Saul. After having been chosen as monarch, Saul returned to his home in Gibeah, along with a number of followers. However, some of the people were openly unhappy with the selection of Saul.
- The Ammonites, led by Nahash, laid siege to Jabesh-Gilead. Under the terms of surrender, the occupants of the city were to be forced into slavery and have their right eyes removed. Instead they sent word of this to the other tribes of Israel, and the tribes west of the Jordan assembled an army under Saul. Saul led the army to victory over the Ammonites, and the people congregated at Gilgal where they acclaimed Saul as king and he was crowned. Saul's first act was to forbid retribution against those who had previously contested his kingship.

André Lemaire finds the third account probably the most reliable tradition. The Pulpit Commentary distinguishes between a private and a public selection process.

=== Military victories ===
After relieving the siege of Jabesh-Gilead, Saul conducted military campaigns against the Moabites, Ammonites, Edomites, Aram Rehob and the kings of Zobah, the Philistines, and the Amalekites. A biblical summary states that "wherever he turned, he was victorious".

In the second year of his reign, King Saul, his son Jonathan, and a small force of a few thousand Israelite soldiers defeated a massive Philistine force of 3,000 chariots, 6,000 horsemen, and more than 30,000 infantry in the pass of Michmash. After the battle, Saul instructed his armies, by a rash oath, to fast. Methodist commentator Joseph Benson suggests that "Saul's intention in putting this oath was undoubtedly to save time, lest the Philistines should gain ground of them in their flight. But the event showed it was a false policy; for the people were so faint and weak for want of food, that they were less able to follow and slay the Philistines than if they had stopped to take a moderate refreshment". Jonathan's party were not aware of the oath and ate honey resulting in Jonathan realizing that he had broken an oath of which he was not aware, but was nevertheless liable for its breach, until popular intervention allowed Jonathan to be saved from death on account of his victory over the Philistines.

=== Rejection ===
During Saul's campaign against the Philistines, Samuel said that he would arrive in seven days to perform the requisite rites. When a week passed with no word of Samuel, and with the Israelites growing restless, Saul prepared for battle by offering sacrifices. Samuel arrived just as Saul had finished sacrificing and reprimanded Saul for not obeying his instructions.

Several years after Saul's victory against the Philistines at Michmash Pass, Samuel instructed Saul to make war on the Amalekites and to "utterly destroy" them including all their livestock in fulfilment of a mandate set out:

When the Lord your God has given you rest from all your enemies on every hand, in the land that the Lord your God is giving you as an inheritance to possess, you shall blot out the remembrance of Amalek from under heaven; do not forget.

Having forewarned the Kenites who were living among the Amalekites to leave, Saul went to war and defeated the Amalekites. Saul killed all the men, women, children and poor quality livestock, but left the king, Agag alive, and the best livestock. When Samuel heard that Saul had disobeyed and plundered the livestock for self-gain, he informed Saul that God had rejected him as king. As Samuel turned to go, Saul seized hold of his garments and had torn off a piece; Samuel prophesied that the kingdom would likewise be torn from Saul. Samuel then killed Agag by himself. Samuel and Saul each returned home and never met again after these events.

=== Saul and David ===
After Samuel told Saul that God had rejected him as king, David, a son of Jesse, from the tribe of Judah, entered the story: from this point on Saul's story is largely the account of his increasingly troubled relationship with David.

- Samuel headed to Bethlehem, ostensibly to offer sacrifice and invited Jesse and his sons. Dining together, Jesse's sons were brought one by one to Samuel, each being rejected; at last, Jesse brought David, the youngest, who was tending sheep. When brought to Samuel, David was anointed by him in front of his other brothers.
- In 1 Samuel 16:25–23, Saul was troubled by an evil spirit sent by God. He requested soothing music, and a servant recommends David the son of Jesse, who was renowned for his skills as a harpist and other talents:

a son of Jesse the Bethlehemite, who is skillful in playing, a mighty man of valor, a man of war, prudent in speech, and a handsome person; and the Lord is with him
When word of Saul's needs reached Jesse, he sent David, who had been looking after Jesse's flock, with gifts as a tribute, and David was appointed as Saul's armor bearer. With Jesse's permission he remained at the court, playing the harp to calm Saul during his troubled spells.

- The Philistines returned with an army to attack Israel, and the Philistine and Israelite forces gathered on opposite sides of a valley. The Philistine's champion Goliath issued a challenge for single combat, but none of the Israelite were brave to fight him. David is described as a young shepherd who was delivering food to his three eldest brothers in the army, and he heard Goliath's challenge. David spoke mockingly of the Philistines to some soldiers; his speech was overheard and reported to Saul, who summoned David and appointed him as his champion. David easily defeated Goliath with a single shot from a sling. At the end of the passage, Saul asked his general, Abner, who David is.

Saul offered his elder daughter Merab as a wife to the now popular David, after his victory over Goliath, but David demurred. David distinguished himself in the Philistine wars. Upon David's return from battle, the women praised him in song:

Saul has slain his thousands and David his tens of thousands

implying that David was the greater warrior. Saul feared David's growing popularity and henceforth viewed him as a rival to the throne.

Saul's son Jonathan and David became close friends. Jonathan recognized David as the rightful king, and "made a covenant with David, because he loved him as his own soul." Jonathan even gave David his military clothes, symbolizing David's position as a successor to Saul.

On two occasions, Saul threw a spear at David while he was playing the harp for Saul. David became increasingly successful and Saul became increasingly resentful. Now Saul actively plotted against David. Saul offered his other daughter, Michal in marriage to David. David also initially rejected this offer, claiming he was too poor. Saul offered to accept a bride price of 100 Philistine foreskins, intending that David should die in the attempt. Instead, David obtained 200 foreskins and was consequently married to Michal. Jonathan arranged a short-lived reconciliation between Saul and David and for a while David served Saul "as in times past" until "the distressing spirit from the Lord" re-appeared. Saul sent assassins in the night, but Michal helped David escape, tricking them by placing a household idol in his bed. David fled to Jonathan, who arranged a meeting with his father. While dining with Saul, Jonathan explained David's absence, saying he had been called away to his brothers. But Saul noticed through the ruse and reprimanded Jonathan for protecting David, warning him that his love of David would cost him the kingdom, furiously throwing a spear at him. The next day, Jonathan met David and told him about Saul's intent. The two friends gave their goodbyes, and David fled into the countryside. Saul later had Michal married to another man.

Saul was later informed by his head shepherd, Doeg the Edomite, that high priest Ahimelech assisted David, giving him the sword of Goliath, which had been kept at the temple at Nob. Doeg killed Ahimelech and eighty-five other priests. Then, Saul ordered the death of the entire population of Nob.

David had left Nob by this point and had amassed some 300 dissatisfied men, including some outlaws. With these men David rescued the town of Keilah from a Philistine attack. Saul realized he could trap David and his men by laying the city to siege. David felt that the citizens of Keilah would betray him to Saul and fled to Ziph pursued by Saul. Saul hunted David in the vicinity of Ziph on two occasions:

- Some of the inhabitants of Ziph betrayed David's location to Saul, but David heard about it and fled with his men to Maon. Saul followed David, but was forced to break off pursuit when the Philistines invaded. After dealing with that threat Saul tracked David to the caves at Ein Gedi. As he searched the cave David had managed to cut off a piece of Saul's robe without being discovered, yet David restrained his men from harming the king. David then left the cave, revealing himself to Saul, and gave a speech that persuaded Saul to reconcile.
- On the second occasion, Saul returned to Ziph with his men. When David heard of this, he slipped into Saul's camp by night, and again restrained his men from killing the king; instead he stole Saul's spear and water jug, leaving his own spear thrust into the ground by Saul's side. The next day, David revealed himself to Saul, showing the jug and spear as proof that he could have slain him. David then persuaded Saul to reconcile with him; the two promised never to harm each other. After this they never met each other again.

=== Battle of Gilboa and the death of King Saul ===
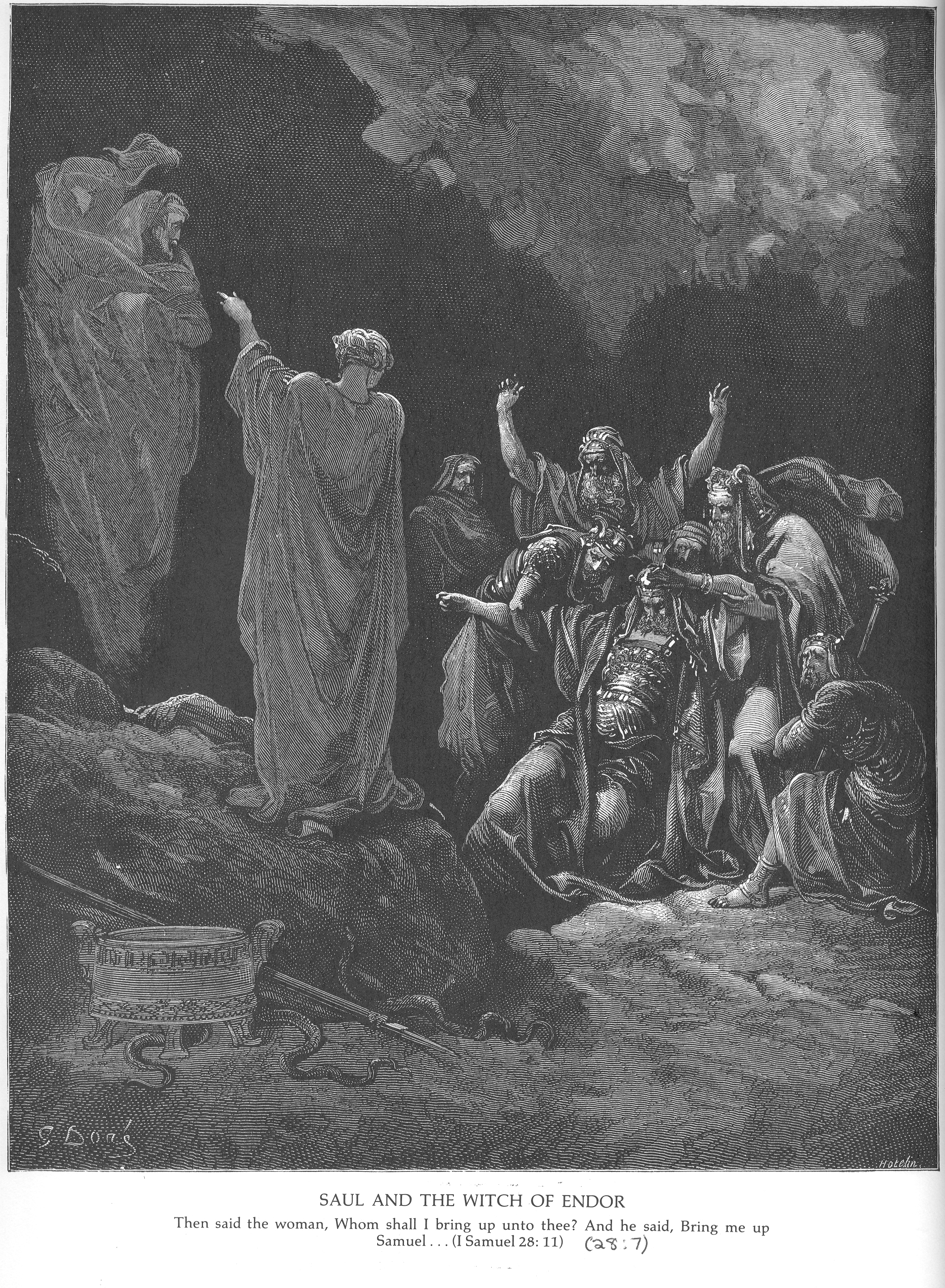
Saul and the Witch of Endor, by Gustave Doré, 1866

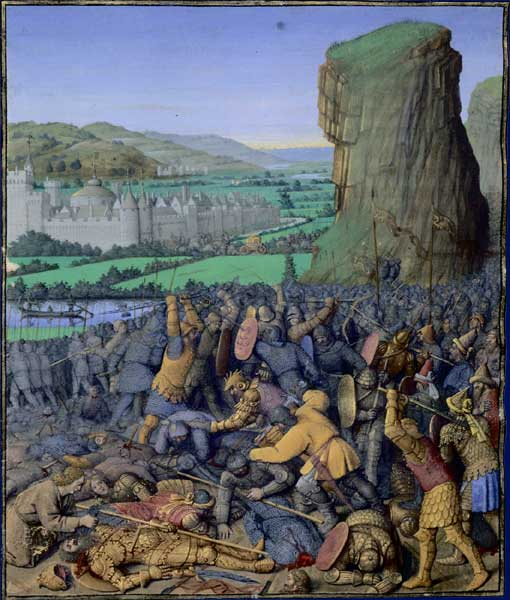
The Battle of Gilboa, by Jean Fouquet, c. 1470, with the protagonists depicted anachronistically with 15th century armour

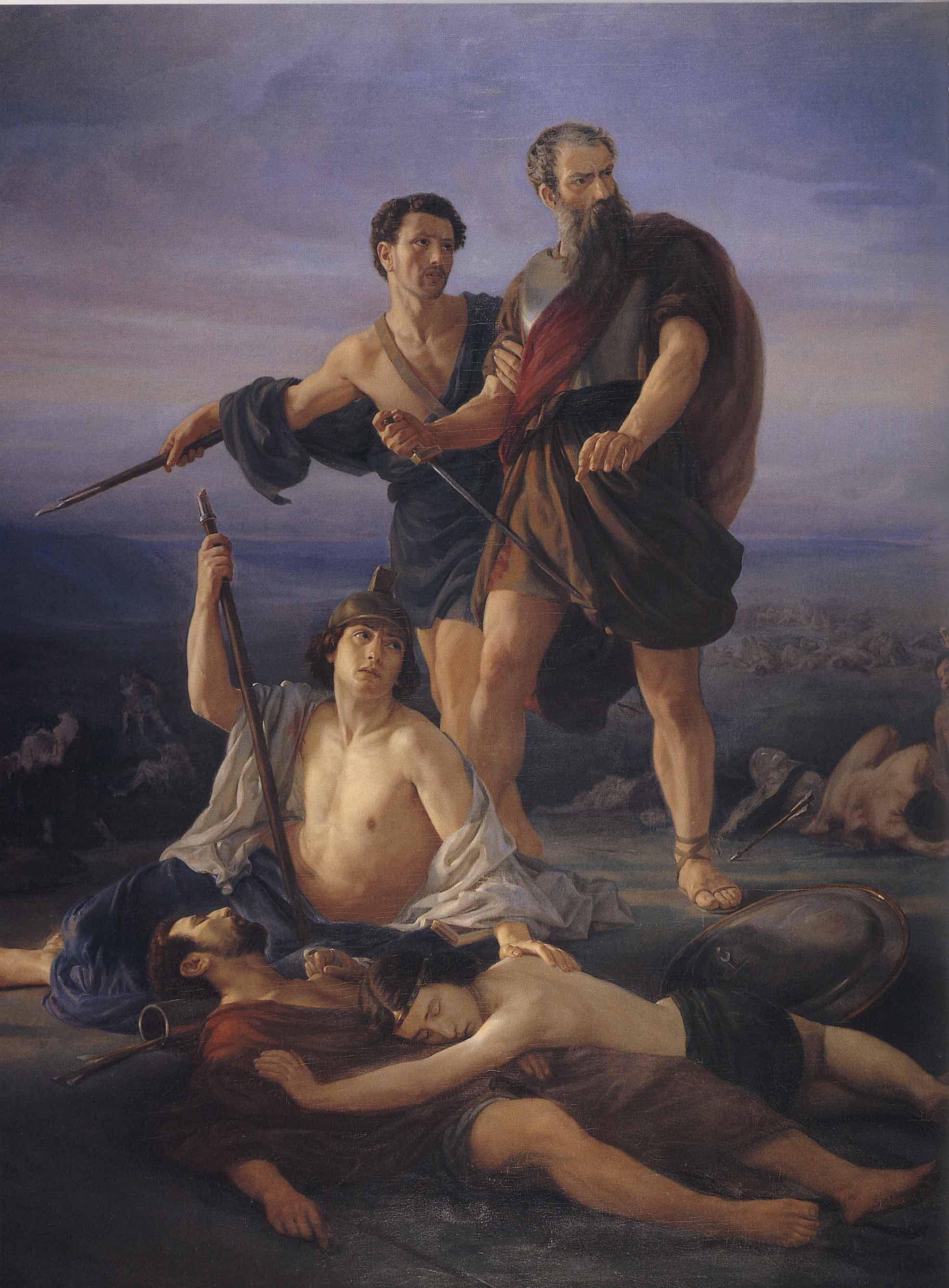
"Death of King Saul", by Elie Zvi Marcuse, c. 1850

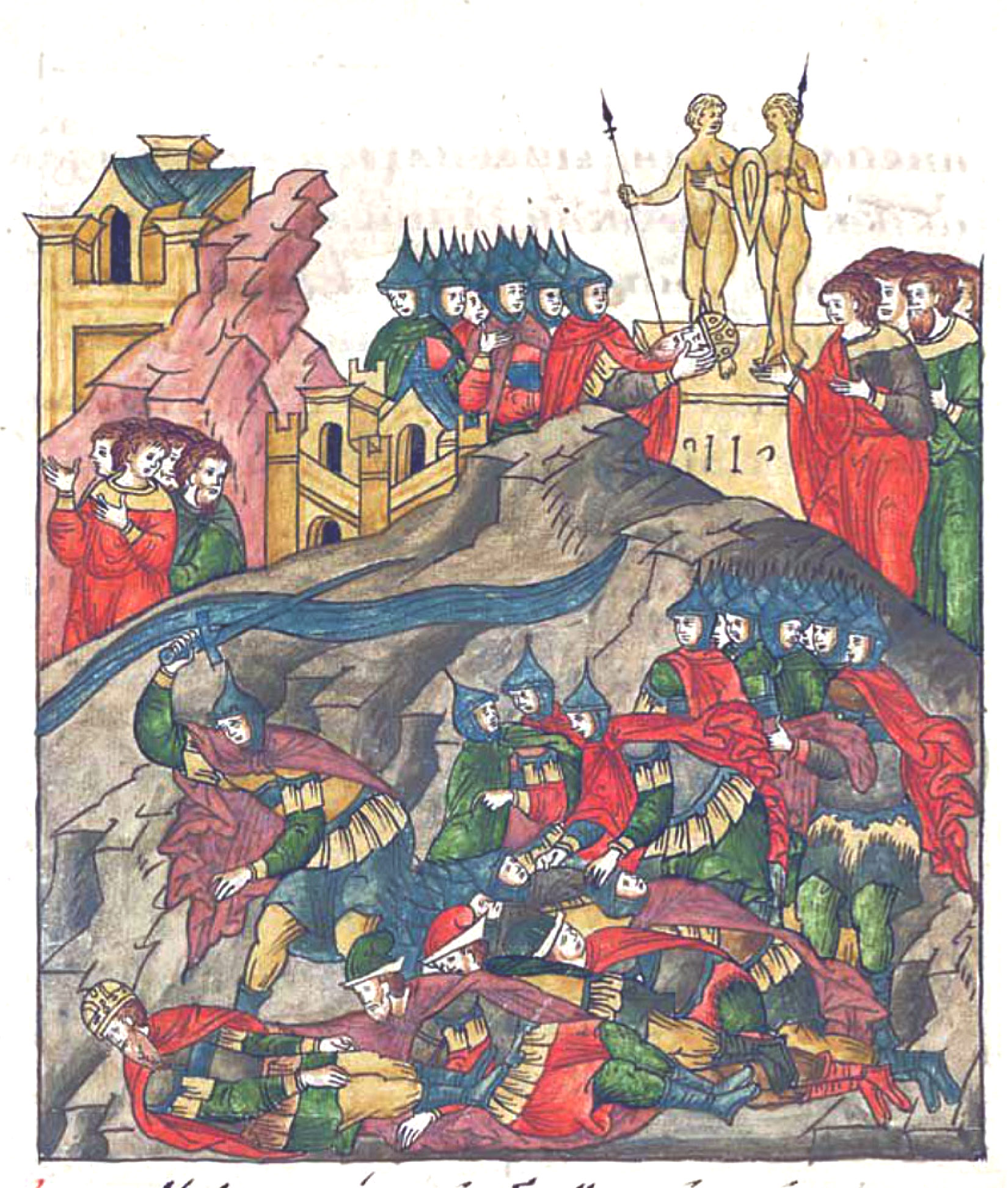
Desecration of Saul's body, c. 1560s

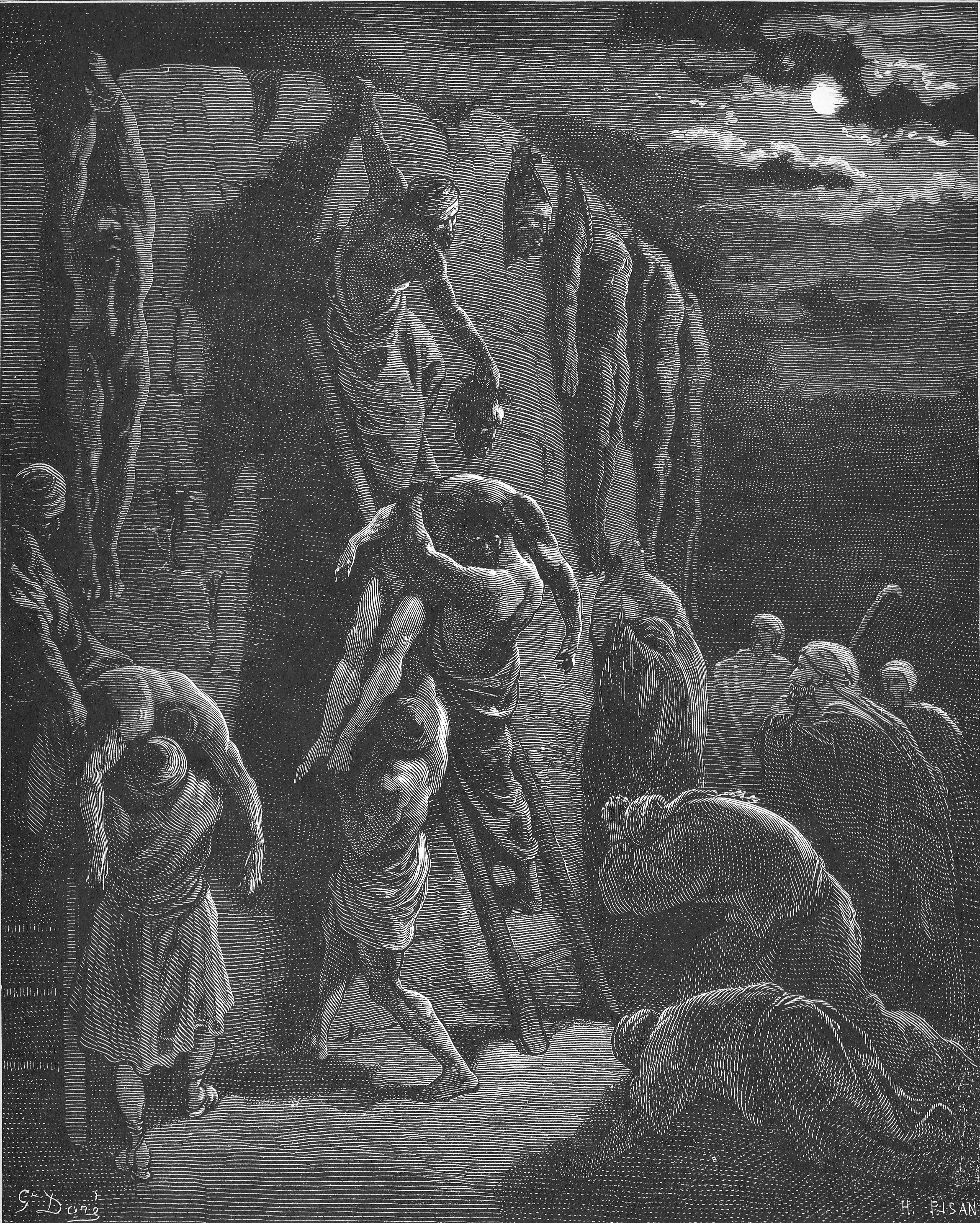
Jabesh-Gileadites recovering the bodies of Saul and his sons, by Gustave Doré, 1866

The Philistines went to war again, assembling at Shunem, and Saul led his army to face them at Mount Gilboa. Before the battle, he went to the village of Endor to consult a spirit medium. Unaware of his identity, the medium reminded him that the king had made witchcraft a capital offence. After he assured her that Saul would not harm her, she conjured a spirit which appeared to be that of the prophet Samuel. The spirit told him that God had fully rejected him, would no longer hear his prayers, had given the kingdom to David, and that the next day he would lose both the battle and his life. Saul collapsed in fear, and the medium restored him with food, anticipating the next day's battle.

Saul's death is described in 1 Samuel 31, and also in 1 Chronicles 10. As the defeated Israelites fled from the enemy, Saul asked his armour-bearer to kill him. After his request was refused, Saul fell upon his own sword. A conflicting account is given in 2 Samuel, in which an Amalekite tells David he found Saul leaning on his spear after the battle and delivered the coup de grâce before taking Saul's crown and armband. David had the Amalekite put to death, advancing the theme that he would never kill the Lord's anointed king.

The victorious Philistines recovered Saul's body as well as those of his three sons, who also died in the battle, decapitated them and displayed them on the wall of Beit She'an. They displayed Saul's armour in a temple to Ashtoreth in Ashkelon. But at night the inhabitants of Jabesh-Gilead retrieved the bodies for cremation and burial.(2 Samuel 2:4–7). Later on, David took the bones of Saul and of his son Jonathan and buried them in Zelah, in the tomb of his father. The account in 1 Chronicles summarises by stating that:

Saul died for his unfaithfulness which he had committed against the Lord, because he did not keep the word of the Lord, and also because he consulted a medium for guidance.

== Biblical criticism ==
There are several textual or narrative issues in the text, including the aforementioned conflicting accounts of Saul's rise to kingship and his death, as well as plays on words, that biblical scholars have discussed.

The birth-narrative of the prophet Samuel is found at 1 Samuel 1:1–28. It describes how Samuel's mother Hannah requested a son from Yahweh, and dedicated the child to God at the shrine of Shiloh. The passage makes extensive play with the root-elements of Saul's name, and ends with the phrase hu sa'ul le-Yahweh 'he is dedicated to Yahweh'. Hannah named the resulting son Samuel, giving as her explanation, 'because from God I requested him'. Samuel's name, however, can mean 'name of God', (or 'Heard of God' or 'Told of God') and the etymology and multiple references to the root of the name seems to fit Saul instead. The majority explanation for the discrepancy is that the narrative originally described the birth of Saul, and was given to Samuel to enhance the position of David and Samuel at the former king's expense.

The Bible's tone with regard to Saul changes over the course of the narrative, especially around the passage where David appears, midway through 1 Samuel. Before, Saul is presented in positive terms, but afterward his mode of ecstatic prophecy is suddenly described as fits of madness, his errors and disobedience to Samuel's instructions were stressed and he became a paranoiac. This may indicate that the David story is inserted from a source loyal to the House of David; David's lament over Saul in 2 Samuel 1 then serves an apologetic purpose, clearing David of the blame for Saul's death.

In the narrative of Saul's private anointing in 1 Samuel 9:1–10:16, Saul is not referred to as a king (melech), but rather as a "leader" or "commander" (nagid). Saul is only given the title "king" (melech) at the public coronation ceremony at Gilgal.

Various authors have attempted to harmonize the two narratives regarding Saul's death. Josephus writes that Saul's attempted suicide was stalled because he was not able to run the sword through himself, and that he therefore asked the Amalekite to finish it. Later biblical criticism has posited that the story of Saul's death was redacted from various sources, although this view in turn has been criticized because it does not explain why the contradiction was left in by the redactors. But since 2 Samuel records only the Amalekite's report, and not the report of any other eyewitness, some scholars theorize that the Amalekite might have been lying to try to gain favor with David. In this view, 1 Samuel records what actually happened, while 2 Samuel records what the Amalekite claimed happened.

== Classical rabbinical views ==
Two opposing views of Saul are found in classical rabbinical literature. One is based on the reverse logic that punishment is a proof of guilt, and therefore seeks to rob Saul of any halo which might surround him. The passage referring to Saul as a choice young man, and goodly is in this view interpreted as meaning that Saul was not good in every respect, but goodly only with respect to his personal appearance. According to this view, Saul is only a weak branch, owing his kingship not to his own merits, but rather to his grandfather, who had been accustomed to light the streets for those who went to the beit midrash, and had received as his reward the promise that one of his grandsons should sit upon the throne.

The second view of Saul makes him appear in the most favourable light as man, as hero, and as king. In this view, it was on account of his modesty that he did not reveal the fact that he had been anointed king; and he was extraordinarily upright as well as perfectly just. Nor was there any one more pious than he; for when he ascended the throne he was as pure as a child, and had never committed sin. He was marvelously handsome; and the maidens who told him concerning Samuel talked so long with him to observe his beauty for longer. In war he was able to march 120 miles without rest. When commanded to smite Amalek, Saul said: "For one found slain the Torah requires a sin offering; and here so many shall be slain. If the old have sinned, why should the young suffer; and if men have been guilty, why should the cattle be destroyed?" It was this humaneness which cost him his crown. And while Saul was merciful to his enemies, he was strict with his own people; when he found out that Ahimelech, a kohen, had assisted David with finding food, Saul, in retaliation, killed the remaining 85 kohanim of Ahimelech's family and the rest of his hometown, Nob. The fact that he was merciful even to his enemies, being indulgent to rebels themselves, and frequently waiving the homage due to him, was incredible as well as deceiving. But if his mercy toward a foe was a sin, it was his only one; it was his misfortune that it was reckoned against him, while David (who had committed many sins) was so favored that it was not remembered to his injury. In some respects Saul was superior to David, e.g., in having only one concubine (Rizpah), while David had many. Saul expended his own substance for the war, and although he knew that he and his sons would fall in battle, he nevertheless went forward, while David heeded the wish of his soldiers not to go to war in person.

According to the Rabbis, Saul followed the rules of ritual impurity prescribed for the sacrifice, and taught the people how they should slaughter cattle. As a reward for this, God himself gave Saul a sword on the day of battle, since no other sword suitable for him was found. Saul's attitude toward David was excused by arguing that his courtiers were all tale-bearers, and slandered David to him; and in like manner he was incited by Doeg against the priests of Nob—this act was forgiven him, however, and a heavenly voice (bat kol) was heard, proclaiming: "Saul is the chosen one of God". His anger at the Gibeonites was not personal hatred, but was induced by zeal for the welfare of Israel. The fact that he made his daughter remarry finds its explanation in his (Saul's) view that her betrothal to David had been gained by false pretenses, and was therefore invalid. During the lifetime of Saul there was no idolatry in Israel. The famine in the reign of David, seemingly blamed on Saul, was in fact the people's fault, for not according Saul the proper honours at his burial. In Sheol, Samuel reveals to Saul that in the next world, Saul would dwell with Samuel, which is a proof that all has been forgiven him by God.

== In Islam ==
In the Quran, the character Talut (Arabic: طالوت) is traditionally identified with king Saul. Muslims believe that (as in the Bible) he was the commander of Israelites. According to the Qur'an, Talut was chosen by the Prophet Samuel (not mentioned by name explicitly, but rather as "a Prophet" of the Israelites) after being asked by the Israelites for a King to lead them into war. The Israelites criticized Samuel for appointing Talut, lacking respect for Talut because he was not wealthy. Samuel rebuked the people for this and told them that Talut was more favored than they were. Talut led the Israelites to victory over the army of Goliath, who was killed by David. Talut is considered a divinely appointed king.

=== Name ===
The name Ṭālūt has uncertain etymology. Unlike some other Quranic figures, the Arabic name is not similar to the Hebrew name (Sha'ul). According to Muslim exegetes, the name means 'tall' (from the Arabic tūl) and refers to the extraordinary stature of Saul, which would be consistent with the Biblical account. In explanation of the name, exegetes such as Tha'labi hold that at this time, the future King of Israelites was to be recognised by his height; Samuel set up a measure, but no one in the land reached its height except Ṭālūt (Saul).

=== Saul as the King of Israel ===
In the Qur'an, the Israelites demanded a King after the time of Moses. God appointed Talut as their King. Saul was distinguished by the greatness of his knowledge and of his physique; it was a sign of his role as King that God brought back the Ark of the Covenant for Israel. Talut tested his people at a river; whoever drank from it would not follow him in battle excepting one who takes [from it] in the hollow of his hand. Many drank but only the faithful ventured on. In the battle, however, David slew Goliath and was made the subsequent King of Israel.

The Qur'anic account differs from the Biblical account (if Saul is assumed to be Talut) in that in the Bible the sacred Ark was returned to the Israelites before Saul's accession, and the test by drinking water is made in the Hebrew Bible not by Saul but by Gideon.

== Historicity ==
The historicity of Saul's kingdom is not universally accepted and there is insufficient extra-biblical evidence to verify if the biblical account reflects historical reality. While several scholars believe that the existence of the United Monarchy is corroborated by archaeological evidence, although with considerable theological exaggerations, others, like Israel Finkelstein, believe it to be a late ideological construct.

In the Jewish Study Bible (2014), Oded Lipschits states the concept of the United Monarchy should be abandoned, while Aren Maeir highlights the lack of evidence about the United Monarchy. However, in his books Beyond the Texts (2018) and Has Archeology Buried the Bible? (2020) William G. Dever has defended the historicity of the United Monarchy, maintaining that the reigns of Saul, David and Solomon are "reasonably well attested". Similar arguments were advanced by Amihai Mazar in a 2013 essay, which points toward recent archaeological evidence emerging from excavation sites in Jerusalem by Eilat Mazar and in Khirbet Qeiyafa by Yosef Garfinkel. In their book, The Bible's First Kings (2025), Avraham Faust and Zev Farber have also defended the existence of the United Monarchy, arguing that archaeological evidence and early biblical traditions attest to its emergence in the 11th-10th centuries BC. Archeology seems to confirm that until about 1000 BC, the end of Iron Age I, Israelite society was essentially a society of farmers and stockbreeders, without any truly centralized organization and administration.

== Psychological analyses ==
Accounts of Saul's behavior have made him a popular subject for speculation among modern psychiatrists. George Stein views the passages depicting Saul's ecstatic episodes as suggesting that he may have suffered from mania. Martin Huisman sees the story of Saul as illustrative of the role of stress as a factor in depression. Liubov Ben-Noun of Ben-Gurion University of the Negev, believes that passages referring to King Saul's disturbed behavior indicate he was afflicted by a mental disorder, and lists a number of possible conditions. However, Christopher C. H. Cook of the Department of Theology and Religion, Durham University, UK recommends caution in offering any diagnoses in relation to people who lived millennia ago.

== See also ==
- Midrash Samuel

== Bibliography ==
- Driver, S. R. (1890). Notes on the Hebrew Text of the Books of Samuel. Oxford: Clarendon Press.
- Cheyne, T. K. (1892). Aids to the Devout Study of Criticism. New York: Thomas Whittaker. pp. 1–126.
- Kent, Grenville (2014). "'Call up Samuel': Who Appeared to the Witch at En-Dor? (1 Samuel 28:3-25)". Andrews University Seminary Studies (AUSS). 52 (2). ISSN 0003-2980.
- Smith, H. P. (1903). "VII. The Early Monarchy". Old Testament History. New York: C. Scribner's Sons. pp. 106–128.
- Cheyne, T. K.; Black, J. Sutherland, eds. (1899). Encyclopaedia Biblica. George N. Morang & Co.
- Reiss, Moshe (January–March 2004). "Samuel and Saul: A Negative Symbiosis". Jewish Bible Quarterly. 32 (1): 35–43.
- Hudson, J. Francis (1992). Rabshakeh. Oxford: Lion Publishing. ISBN 978-0-7459-2267-6. A fictionalisation of Saul's tragedy.
- Green, Adam (2007). King Saul: The True History of the First Messiah. Cambridge: Lutterworth. ISBN 978-0-7188-3074-8.

Saul of the United Kingdom of Israel & Judah House of Saul Cadet branch of the Tribe of Benjamin
Regnal titles
New title Anointed king to replace Judge Samuel	King of the United Kingdom of Israel and Judah	Succeeded by Ish-bosheth
