= Merab =

Elder daughter of Saul

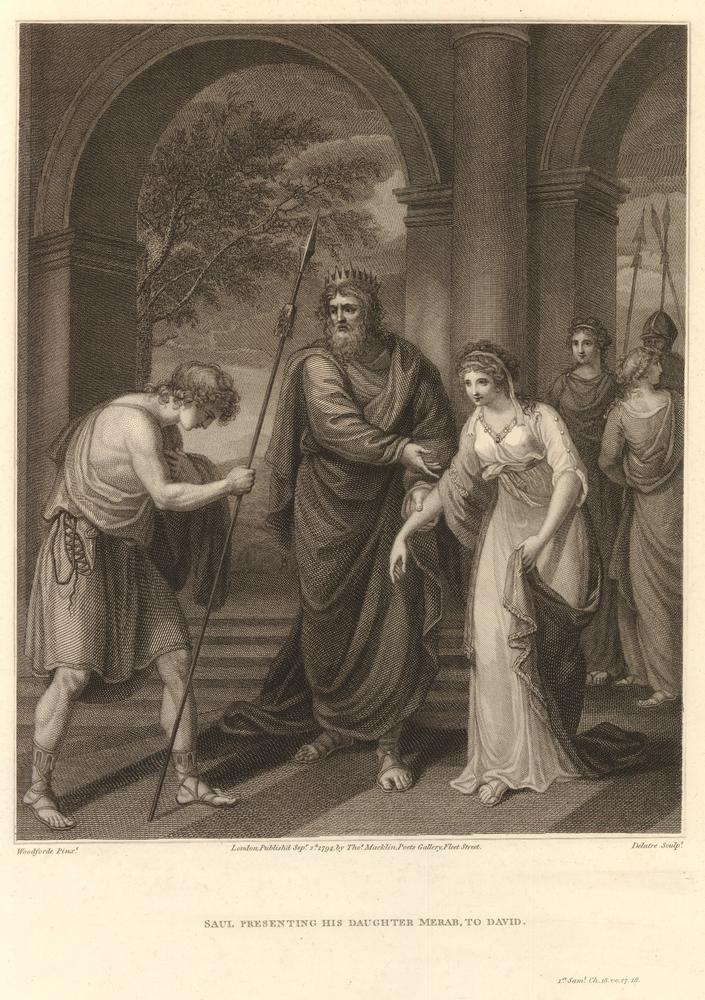
Saul presenting his daughter Merab, to David. Engraving from the Macklin Bible, 1794.

Merab is a character in the Hebrew Bible, mentioned in the Book of Samuel. She is the eldest daughter of Saul, and older sister to Michal.

After David killed Goliath, Saul offered Merab to him in marriage, but David respectfully declined. Saul then gave Merab in marriage to Adriel the Meholathite (1 Samuel 18:19). David may, however, have actually wanted to marry her, and his response was merely a polite refusal. It appears that Saul went ahead with the scheduled wedding, simply with a different groom. Amy Kalmanofsky suggests that Merab is indifferent, and that this is contrasted in the text with Michal's passion.

2 Samuel 21:8 refers to "the five sons of Merab the daughter of Saul, whom she bore to Adriel the son of Barzillai the Meholathite" (ESV). This is the reading in the Septuagint and two Hebrew manuscripts but in fact the Masoretic Text has "Michal" (which the KJV follows). J. J. Glück argues for the "Michal" reading on the basis that if Merab were in view, there would be no need to mention her husband, but with Michal, it was important to indicate that these were not David's children.
