= Abigail =

Wife of King David in the Bible

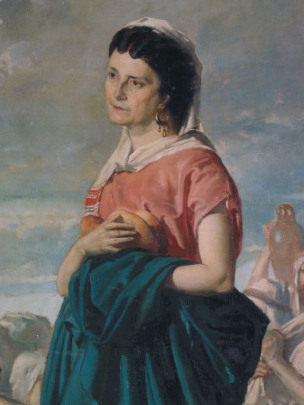
- Detail from Abigail by Antonio Cortina Farinós, 19th cent.
- Spouses: Nabal; David
- Children: Chileab

Abigail (Hebrew: אֲבִיגַיִל, Modern: ʾAvīgayīl, Tiberian: ʾĂḇīḡayīl) was an Israelite woman in the Hebrew Bible married to Nabal; she married the future King David after Nabal's death (1 Samuel 25). Abigail was David's third wife, after Ahinoam and Saul's daughter, Michal, whom Saul later married to Palti, son of Laish, when David went into hiding.

Abigail became the mother of one of David's sons, who is listed in the Book of Chronicles under the name Daniel, in the Masoretic Text of the Books of Samuel as Chileab, and in the Septuagint text of 2 Samuel 3:3 as Δαλουια, Dalouia. Her name is spelled Abigal in 2 Samuel 17:25 in the American Standard Version.

== Name ==
Derived from the Hebrew word ab, "father", and the Hebrew root g-y-l, "to rejoice," the name Abigail has a variety of possible meanings including "my father's joy" and "source of joy".

== Biblical narrative ==
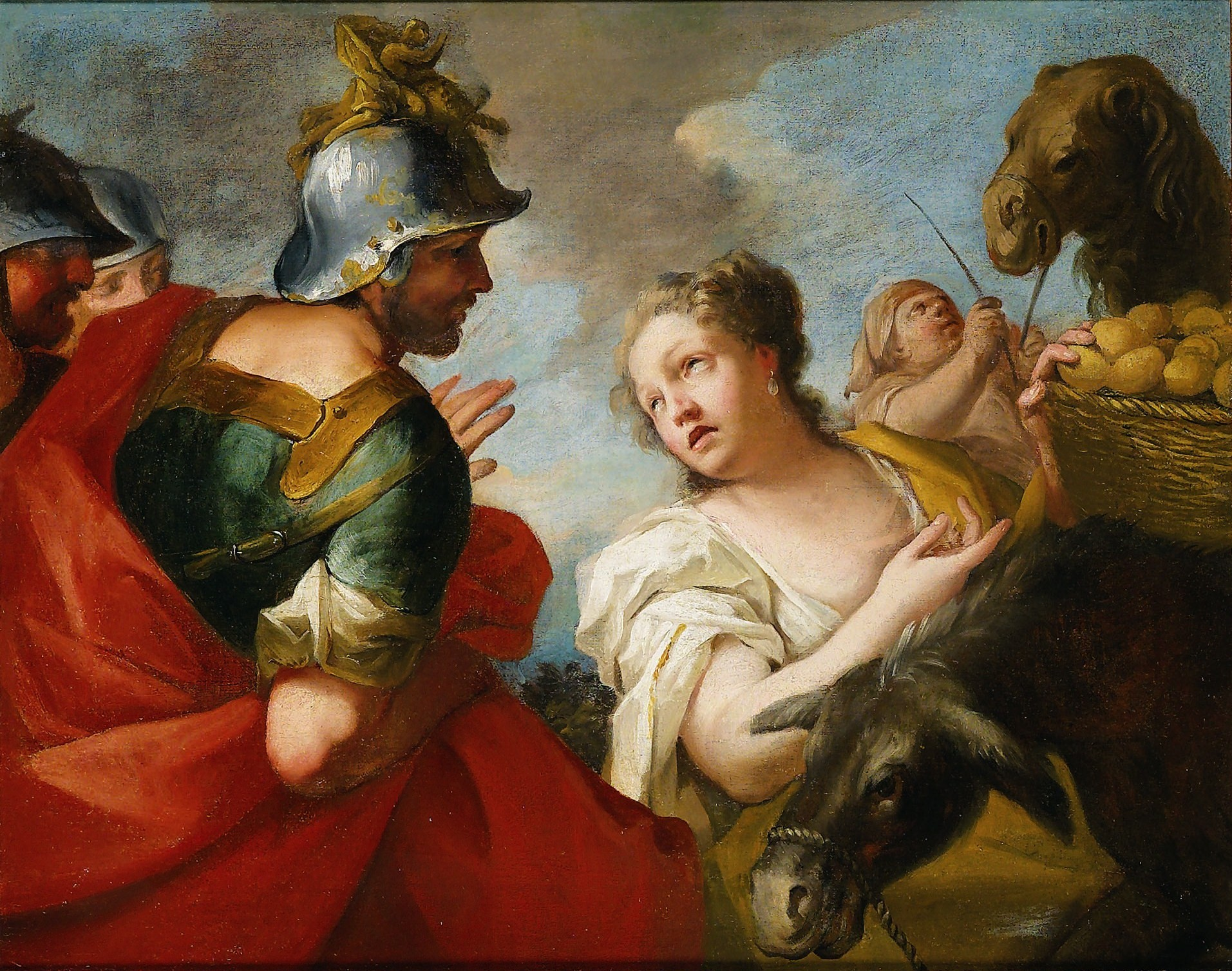
David and Abigail by Antonio Molinari

In 1 Samuel 25, Nabal demonstrates ingratitude towards David, the son of Jesse (from the tribe of Judah), and Abigail attempts to placate David, in order to stop the future King from taking revenge. She gives him food, and speaks to him, urging him not to "have on his conscience the staggering burden of needless bloodshed" (verse 31, NIV) and reminding him that God will make him a "lasting dynasty" (verse 28). Jon Levenson calls this an "undeniable adumbration" of Nathan's prophecy in 2 Samuel 7. Alice Bach notes that Abigail pronounces a "crucial prophecy," and the Talmud regards her as one of the Tanakh's seven female prophets. Levenson, however, suggests that she "senses the drift of history" from intelligence rather than from special revelation.

After Abigail reveals to Nabal what she has done, "God struck Nabal and he died" (v. 38), after which David married her. Abigail is described as intelligent and beautiful. The Talmud amplifies this idea, mentioning her as being one of the "four women of surpassing beauty in the world" (the other three being Rahab, Sarah, and Esther). Being married to the wealthy Nabal, she is also a woman of high socioeconomic status. Whether David married her because he was attracted to her, or as an astute political move, or both is unclear.

Abigail and David's second wife, Ahinoam the Jezreelite, accompany David and his war band as they seek refuge in Philistine territory. While David and his men are encamped near Jezreel, the women are captured by Amalekites who raided the town of Ziklag and carried off the women and children. David led the pursuit, and they were subsequently rescued. Both wives then settle with David in Hebron, where Abigail gives birth to David's second son, Chileab (also called Daniel).

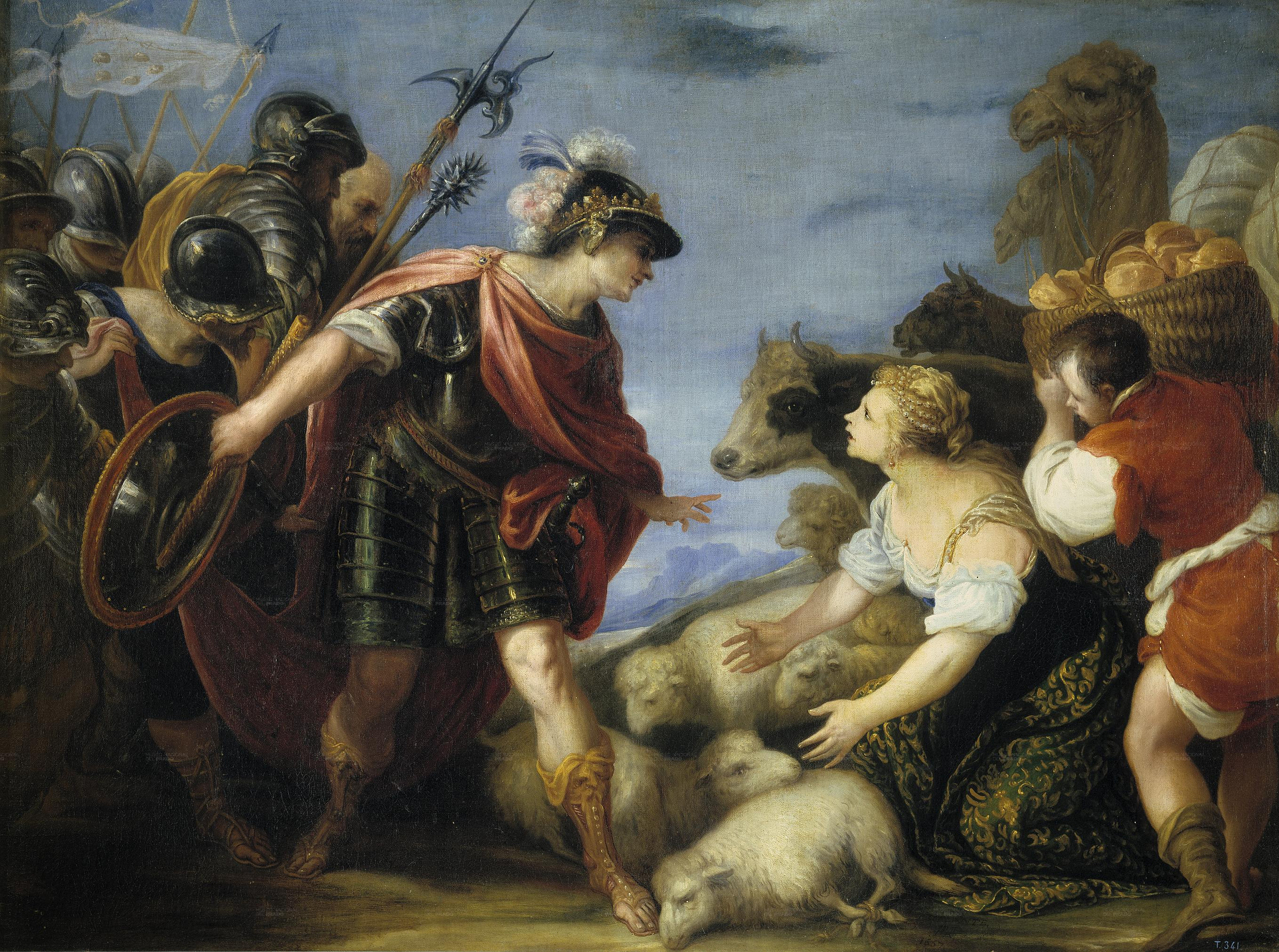
Prudent Abigail by Juan Antonio Escalante

Abigail is also listed as one of the seven Jewish women prophets, the other six being Miriam, Deborah, Hannah, Sarah, Huldah, and Esther. In terms of her moral character, Abraham Kuyper argues that Abigail's conduct indicates "a most appealing character and unwavering faith," but Alice Bach regards her as subversive.

Adele Berlin contrasts the story of Abigail with that of Bathsheba. In one, the wife prevents David from murdering her foolish and greedy husband. In the second, David orders the death of a good man because he desires his wife. "In the Abigail story, David, the potential king, is seen as increasingly strong and virtuous, whereas in the Bathsheba story, the reigning monarch shows his flaws ever more overtly and begins to lose control of his family."

Levenson and Halpern suggest that Abigail may, in fact, also be the same person as Abigail, mother of Amasa. Richard M. Davidson, however, points out that "on the basis of the final form of Old Testament canon, references to Abigail in the biblical accounts indicate two different individuals."

== Generic use ==
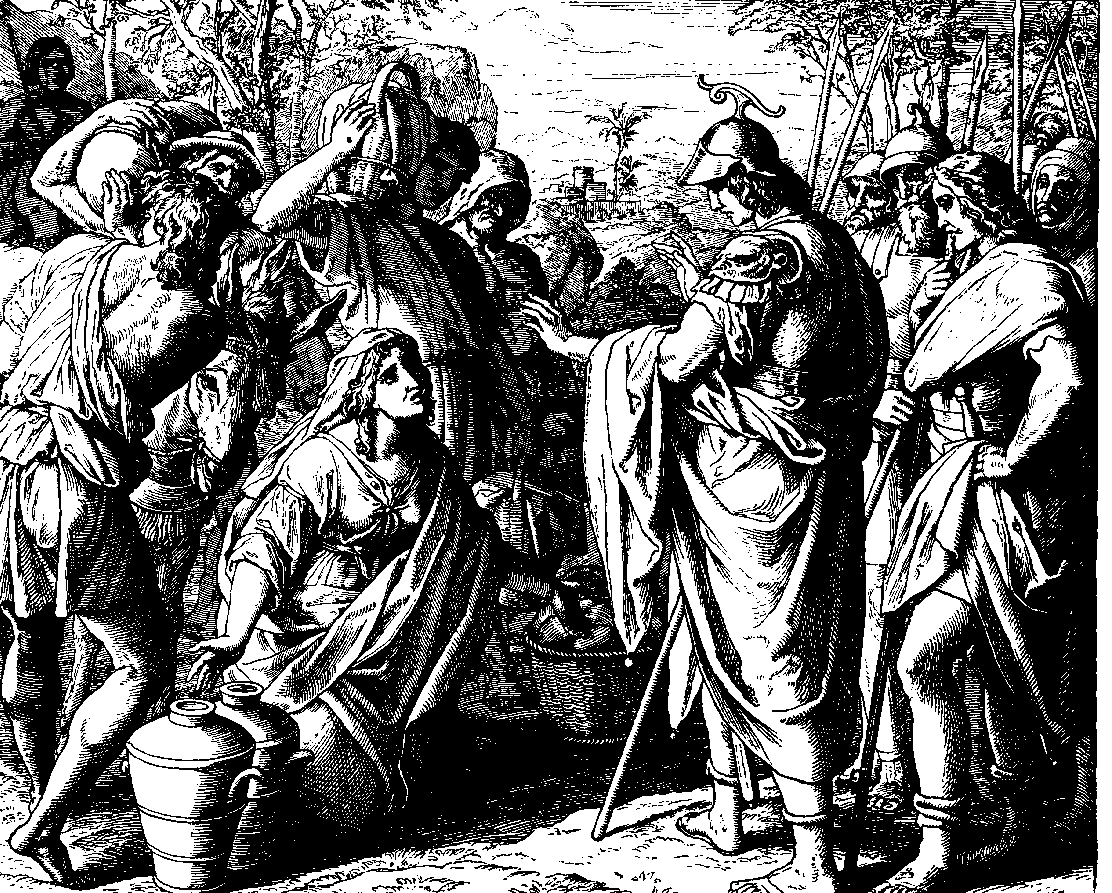
David and Abigail, 1860 woodcut by Julius Schnorr von Karolsfeld

Abigail's self-styling as a handmaid led to Abigail being a traditional term for a waiting-woman, for example as the "waiting gentlewoman" in Beaumont and Fletcher's The Scornful Lady, published in 1616. Jonathan Swift, Tobias Smollett, and Henry Fielding use Abigail in this generic sense, as does Charlotte Brontë. Walter Scott, in The Abbot, frequently refers to Lilias, Lady Avenel's maid as an "Abigail". Anthony Trollope makes two references to "the abigail" (all lower case) in The Eustace Diamonds, at the beginning of Chapter 42, whilst Thomas Mann makes the same reference at the start of the second chapter of Part 2 in Buddenbrooks (published in 1901). William Rose Benet notes the notoriety of Abigail Hill, better known as "Mrs Masham", a lady-in-waiting to Queen Anne. George MacDonald Fraser makes mention of "an 'abigail' fussing about the room" in his novel Flashman from The Flashman Papers series.

== In art ==
Abigail, and especially her meeting with David, was a common subject of European artwork in the Renaissance and post-Renaissance period. Artists depicting her, or them, include Antonio Molinari, Juan Antonio Escalante, and Peter Paul Rubens.

Abigail is a featured figure on Judy Chicago's installation piece The Dinner Party, being represented in one of the 999 tiles of the Heritage Floor.

== General and cited references ==
- Chicago, Judy. The Dinner Party: From Creation to Preservation. London: Merrell (2007). ISBN 1-85894-370-1.
- Henry Gardiner Adams, ed. (1857). "Abigail". A Cyclopaedia of Female Biography: 2–3. Wikidata Q115281287.
