= House of David (TV series) =

2025 American TV series

- Genre: Historical drama
- Created by: Jon Erwin
- Starring: Michael Iskander; Ali Suliman; Stephen Lang; Ayelet Zurer; Indy Lewis; Ethan Kai; Martyn Ford
- Music by: Kevin Kiner; Sean Kiner; Deana Kiner
- Country of origin: United States
- No. of seasons: 2
- No. of episodes: 16

Production
- Executive producers: Jon Erwin; Jonathan Lloyd Walker; Jon Gunn; Trey Callaway; Justin Rosenblatt; Chad Oakes; Mike Frislev; Mark McNair; Adam Abel; Gavin J. Behrman
- Running time: 51–61 minutes
- Production companies: The WONDER Project; Nomadic Pictures; Argonauts; Kingdom Story Company; Amazon MGM Studios; Lionsgate Television

Original release
- Network: Amazon Prime Video
- Release: February 27, 2025 – present
- Network: Wonder Project
- Release: October 5, 2025 – present

House of David is an American Biblical historical drama television series. Created, co-directed, and co-written by filmmaker Jon Erwin for Amazon Prime Video, it is a multi-season series about the life of King David, a central figure of Judaism, Christianity and Islam. Primarily set in the Kingdom of Israel in 1000 BC, the series depicts the rise of David, tracing his journey from his paternal servitude as a shepherd to his battle against Goliath and eventual kingship with the House of David succeeding the House of Saul. Michael Iskander stars as David alongside Ali Suliman, Stephen Lang, Ayelet Zurer, Indy Lewis, Ethan Kai, and Martyn Ford.

The series was produced by The Wonder Project, a studio led by Erwin and Kelly Merryman Hoogstraten, in collaboration with Amazon MGM Studios, and is internationally distributed by Lionsgate. The creators have emphasized that the show is made for a broad audience, not just religious people.

The series premiered on February 27, 2025, with the first three episodes made available on Amazon Prime Video, followed by weekly releases for the remaining episodes. The series received positive feedback for its high production quality and its respectful portrayal of Jewish traditions and the biblical story. Within its first 17 days, the show attracted 22 million viewers, and Amazon Prime announced the renewal for a second season. Season 2 was released beginning October 5, 2025 exclusively to subscribers to the Wonder Project add-on, with general availability to all Prime subscribers on March 27, 2026. The series has been renewed for a third and final season.

== Premise ==
Set in 1000 BC in Israel, the first season chronicles David as a young shepherd anointed by the prophet Samuel to be the next king following Saul's mental deterioration. On his path to the throne, David encounters both challenges and opportunities from his faith and relationships, culminating with his fight against the Philistine giant Goliath.

== Cast and characters ==
=== Main ===
- Michael Iskander as David: A shepherd in Bethlehem from the Tribe of Judah who is anointed to be the next king of Israel. A poet and a musician playing the lyre, he is the youngest son of Jesse and Nitzevet, the younger brother of Eliab, Abinadab, Nethaneel, Raddai, and Ozem, the older brother of Avva, and a relative of Joab.
  - Raphael Korniets portrays a young David
- Ali Suliman as Saul: The first king of Israel from the Tribe of Benjamin, the husband of Ahinoam, the father of Jonathan, Eshbaal, Mirab, and Michal, and the cousin of Abner. He is a former donkey herder and the son of Kish.
- Indy Lewis as Mychal: A princess of Israel, the younger daughter of Saul and Ahinoam, the sister of Jonathan, Eshbaal, and Mirab, and David's love interest.
- Ethan Kai as Jonathan: A prince of Israel, the oldest son of Saul and Ahinoam, and the older brother of Eshbaal, Mirab, and Michal.
- Oded Fehr as Abner: The commander-in-chief of his cousin Saul's army.
- Yali Topol Margalith as Mirab: A princess of Israel, the older daughter of Saul and Ahinoam, and the sister of Jonathan, Eshbaal, and Michal.
- Davood Ghadami as Eliab: A high-ranking soldier in Saul's army, the oldest son of Jesse and Nitzevet, the older brother of David, Abinadab, Nethaneel, Raddai, Ozem, and Avva, and a relative of Joab.
- Ayelet Zurer as Ahinoam: The first queen of Israel, the wife of Saul, and the mother of Jonathan, Eshbaal, Mirab, and Michal.
- Aury Alby as Joab: The second-in-command officer of Saul's army after Abner and a relative of Jesse and his children.

=== Recurring ===
- Inbar Saban as Kazia: A servant girl in King Saul's household
- Stewart Scudamore as Adriel: The chief elder from the Tribe of Judah and an adviser of Saul. He is the son of Barzillai.
- Louis Ferreira as Jesse: A former elder in Bethlehem, the father of David, Eliab, Abinadab, Nethaneel, Raddai, and Ozem, the husband of Nitzevet, and a relative of Joab. He is the son of Obed and the grandson of Boaz.
- Alexander Uloom as Achish: The Philistine king of Gath, one of the five kings of Philistia, and an enemy of Israel.
- Stephen Lang as Samuel: A prophet and a seer of the Lord God, who is the last of the judges leading Israel before anointing Saul and David as kings. He is husband of Hila and the son of Elkanah and Hannah.
- Naby Dakhli as Abinadab: A high-ranking soldier in Saul's army, the second son of Jesse and Nitzevit, a brother of David, Eliab, Nethaneel, Raddai, Ozem, and Avva, and a relative of Joab.
- Reis Daniel as Oaz: The funny axe warrior and David’s new friend
- Rada Rae as Avva: The daughter of Jesse and Nitzevet and the younger sister of David, Eliab, Abinadab, Nethaneel, Raddai, and Ozem.
- Aziz Dyab as Nethaneel: The fourth son of Jesse and Nitzevet, a brother of David, Eliab, Abinadab, Raddai, Ozem, and Avva, and a relative of Joab.
- Stefanos Vuksanovic as Ozem: The sixth son of Jesse and Nitzevet, a brother of David, Eliab, Abinadab, Nethaneel, Raddai, and Avva, and a relative of Joab.
- Konstantinos Krommidas as Raddai: The fifth son of Jesse and Nitzevet, a brother of David, Eliab, Abinadab, Nethaneel, Ozem, and Avva, and a relative of Joab.
- Paolo Luka-Noé as Jordan: The youngest son of Adriel and a love interest of Mirab's.
- Siir Tilif as Nitzevet: The wife of Jesse and the mother of David, as well as his siblings Eliab, Nethaneel, Abinadab, Raddai, Ozem, and Avva.
- Martyn Ford as Goliath: A Philistine giant from Gath descended from Anakim, the last of the Nephilim, an enemy of Israel, and the brother of Lahmi, Ishbi, and Benob.
- Jeremy Xido as King Agag: The king of Amalek and an enemy of Israel.
- Sam Otto as Eshbaal: A prince of Israel, the younger son of Saul and Ahinoam, and the brother of Jonathan, Mirab, and Michal.
- Eden Saban as Besai: A Baal priestess and an advisor to Ahinoam, the queen of Israel and Saul's wife.
- Ashraf Barhom as Doeg: The Edomite chief servant of Saul's herdsmen.
- Nimo Hochenberg as Silas: Samuel's loyal servant.
- Bahia Haifi as Hila: The wife of the prophet Samuel.
- Teym Joseph as Reuben: A young boy who witnesses the Philistine attack on Baal Hazor.
- Alex Anastaopoulos as Azor
- Haydar Koyel as Ashkelon: The Philistine king of Ashkelon, one of the five kings of Philistia, and an enemy of Israel.
- Derek Horsham as Yurza: The Philistine king of Gaza, one of the five kings of Philistia, and an enemy of Israel.
- Raresh DiMofte as Lahmi: A Philistine giant from Gath descended from Anakim, the last of the Nephilim and the brother of Goliath, Ishbi, and Benob.
- Sian Webber as Orpah: The mother of the giants Goliath, Lahmi, Ishbi, and Benob.
- Luzian Gupta as Josiah: A young servant of Saul's.
- Dimitris Ziakas as Ahimelech: The Levite high priest of Israel in Nob.
- Andreas Alevizos as Ishbi: A Philistine giant descended from Anakim, the last of the Nephilim and the brother of Goliath, Lahmi, and Benob.
- Christos Villanakis as Benob: A Philistine giant descended from Anakim, the last of the Nephilim and the brother of Goliath, Lahmi, and Ishbi.

== Episodes ==
Season	Episodes	Originally released		
Season	Episodes	First released	Last released	Network
1	8	February 27, 2025	April 3, 2025	Amazon Prime Video
2	8	October 5, 2025	November 16, 2025	Wonder Project (Note: The second season was released on Amazon Prime Video on March 27, 2026.)

=== Season 1 (2025) ===
No. overall	No. in season	Title	Directed by	Written by	Original release date
1	1	"A Shepherd and a King"	Jon Erwin & Jon Gunn	Teleplay by : Jon Erwin & N.D. Wilson & Nathan A. Jacobs; Story by : Jon Erwin	February 27, 2025
Five hundred years after Moses splits the Red Sea, the seer Samuel (Stephen Lang) anoints Saul (Ali Suliman) from the Tribe of Benjamin as the first king of the Kingdom of Israel for 25 years, yet King Saul gradually becomes prideful of his victories. At the Valley of Elah, 1000 BC, the shepherd David (Michael Iskander) prepares to fight the Philistine giant Goliath (Martyn Ford). One year earlier, David rescues his sheep from a lion in Bethlehem. In Havilah, King Saul and the Israelites defeat King Agag (Jeremy Xido) and the Amalekites while the Philistines attack Baal-Hazor. In Gilgal, King Saul sets up a monument to sacrifice and celebrate with spoils of war but spares King Agag, defying the Lord God's command to destroy Amalek. Samuel receives a prophecy in Ramah and confronts King Saul with a rebuke for disobeying the Lord God, who leaves and rejects Saul as the king by choosing someone to replace him. King Saul loses his sanity after tearing Samuel's robe while Samuel slays King Agag. As David kills the lion in a cave, Samuel searches for the next king.
2	2	"Deep Calls to Deep"	Jon Erwin & Jon Gunn	Jon Erwin & Jon Gunn & N.D. Wilson	February 27, 2025
Several years earlier, in Bethlehem, David becomes an outcast as a bastard. After David's mother, Nitzevet (Siir Tilif), sacrifices herself to save David from the lion, David's father, Jesse (Louis Ferreira), forces David to work as a shepherd. In the present, Jesse admonishes David. In Gibeah, King Saul and Queen Ahinoam (Ayelet Zurer) order the commander-in-chief Abner (Oded Fehr) to find the one whom Samuel anoints. King Achish (Alexander Uloom) of Gath meets with fellow kings of Philistia to plan an attack on Israel. David's older brothers, Eliab (Davood Ghadami) and Abinadab (Naby Dakhli), and their relative, Joab (Aury Alby), return from the Amalekite battle. David attempts to convince Eliab and Abinadab to enlist him in the army. The priest Ahimelech (Dimitris Ziakas) teaches Princess Michal (Indy Lewis) about the scriptures. Encountering King Achish and the Philistines in Baal-Hazor, David and a wounded Eliab escape. King Saul loses his sanity again, and Prince Jonathan (Ethan Kai) and Abner suppress him.
3	3	"The Anointing"	Alexandra La Roche	Jon Erwin & Bekah Hubbell	February 27, 2025
Due to his worsening mental state, King Saul accidentally kills a servant with his spear. Jesse and his other sons heal Eliab. Abner commands King Saul's Edomite servant, Doeg (Ashraf Barhom), to find Samuel. Samuel goes to Bethlehem to anoint one of Jesse's sons as the new king. Queen Ahinoam, with Abner, consults a medium to break King Saul's curse. King Achish meets with the mother of giants, Orpah (Sian Webber), and the Anakim descendants, including Goliath and Lahmi (Raresh DiMofte), to assemble an alliance against Israel. Entering Bethlehem, Samuel invites Jesse and his sons to offer sacrifice. Under the Lord God's guidance, Samuel assesses David's seven older brothers, including Eliab, Abinadab, Nethaneel (Aziz Dyab), Raddai (Konstantinos Krommidas), and Ozem (Stefanos Vuksanovic), but rejects each one as king. Learning that David, the youngest, is not present, Samuel reprimands Jesse, who sends for David. When David arrives, Samuel senses that he is the one. Samuel anoints David as the new king of Israel. Meanwhile, King Saul returns to his throne.
4	4	"The Song of Moses"	Alexandra La Roche	Bekah Hubbell	March 6, 2025
Before leaving, Samuel blesses David, who receives the Lord God's Holy Spirit. Jesse and his other sons agree that no one can know of David's anointing. Joab delivers an order to bring David to the palace. After the Tribe of Dan's elder Yahir alleges that Prince Eshbaal (Sam Otto) defiled his daughter Dina, Queen Ahinoam banishes her son to the city of refuge of Endor, following the Law of Moses. In Gibeah, Queen Ahinoam summons David to comfort King Saul with music. David plays the lyre and sings his psalm, pleasing King Saul. Despite Eliab's warning, David befriends Princess Michal, whom he had met earlier. Princess Michal teaches David how to read and write, deepening their relationship. David continues to play the lyre while singing the Song of Moses, winning King Saul's favor. Believing King Saul pursues him, Samuel hides with his wife. After the convoy transporting Prince Eshbaal is ambushed, an unidentified figure asks Eshbaal to join him, and Eshbaal accepts.
5	5	"The Wolf and the Lion"	Michael Nankin	Laura Kenar	March 13, 2025
Queen Ahinoam tries to cover up King Saul's insanity and show strength by hosting a feast to welcome Adriel (Stewart Scudamore), the chief elder from the Tribe of Judah. Despite objections from Queen Ahinoam, Eliab, and Joab, David pursues a relationship with Princess Michal. The House of Saul plans to unite with Adriel, where King Saul offers a reluctant Princess Michal in marriage with one of Adriel's sons. Undetected by others, King Saul is tormented by a menacing spirit resembling King Agag. When David plays his lyre, King Saul's presence of mind is momentarily restored and he promotes Adriel as an adviser. Observing that Princess Merab (Yali Topol Margalith) has connected with another of Adriel's sons, King Saul decides that she instead should be the daughter whom he marries off. During the blessing ceremony, Adriel receives the scroll of the Blessing of Jacob from King Saul and reads it. The harmful spirit continues to manipulate King Saul, who accuses Adriel of trying to take his throne. King Saul again oscillates into madness, prompting him and Adriel to cancel their alliance and Princess Merab's marriage. Both unable to sleep, King Saul and David speak peaceably. King Saul invites David to sit on his throne, which David does not do until King Saul has returned to bed.
6	6	"Giants Awakened"	Michael Nankin	Jonathan Lloyd Walker	March 20, 2025
Orpah narrates the origin of giants from the Nephilim as the offspring of rebellious angels known as the Watchers, including Samyaza, and humans, acknowledging Goliath, Lahmi, Ishbi (Andreas Alevizos), and Benob (Christos Villanakis) as the last of them. At the palace, David becomes closer to King Saul. In Gath, King Achish proposes an alliance with Orpah and Goliath, providing Mycenaean bronze armor and weapons to Goliath and training him in combat, yet declines Orpah's request for the throne. Upon discovering David's hidden background, Princess Michal confronts him, but also confesses her love for him. However, due to her royal obligations, she says they can never be together. Doeg seeks his ulterior agenda for King Achish by killing Orpah and blaming it on Israel and the House of Saul. Realizing his music cannot cure King Saul's descent, David leaves Gibeah, confessing his love for Princess Michal to Princess Merab, and comes home. On Mount Sinai, Prince Jonathan finds Samuel, who reveals he has anointed another as the next king. Prince Jonathan comes across the Philistine armies assembling at the Valley of Elah, informing King Saul, Abner, and Joab. Goliath ambushes an Israelite camp and returns to Gath to avenge Orpah's death, allying with King Achish.
7	7	"David and Goliath - Part 1"	Jon Erwin & Jon Gunn	Jon Erwin & Jon Gunn	March 27, 2025
Jesse sends his sons including Nethaneel, Raddai, and Ozem to join their older brothers in the war, but does not allow David to go. Samuel visits Jesse and David for a sacrifice. At the Valley of Elah, King Saul rallies the Israelite armies while the Philistine armies from Gath, Ashkelon, Ashdod, and Gaza unite with King Achish, King Ashkelon (Haydar Koyel), King Ashdod (Yannis Anastasakis), and King Yurza (Derek Horsham). An armored Goliath wielding weapons emerges, challenging the Israelites to send their king or greatest champion to fight him. He loudly defies Israel and the Lord God, frightening the Israelites and causing more torment for King Saul. King Saul becomes disoriented and searches for someone willing to fight Goliath. David tells Samuel of his vision, and Samuel relates it to the commander of the Lord's army, who appears to Joshua several centuries ago, affirming David's fate. Goliath continues to intimidate the Israelites for weeks, and Prince Jonathan decides to fight him, recalling the Battle of Michmash. Samuel encourages Jesse to reflect more openly on the reason he holds back David. Acknowledging Samuel's prophecy, Jesse reconciles with David, revealing his love for him and Nitzevet, and commands David to bring provisions for David's brothers on the battlefield.
8	8	"David and Goliath - Part 2"	Jon Erwin & Jon Gunn	Jon Erwin & Jonathan Lloyd Walker & Nathan A. Jacobs	April 3, 2025
The Philistines attack the Tribe of Zebulun as it retreats from the Israelite encampment, slaughtering everyone when they enter the canyon path. Jonathan leads a small party into the Philistine camp to try to kill Goliath and the other giants in their sleep, but his fellow soldiers are killed and Jonathan is captured when one of them is revealed to be a traitor. Goliath continues to taunt Israel for forty days. King Achish releases Prince Jonathan on condition that he convince King Saul to surrender. Reaching the camp with Princess Merab, Princess Michal comforts King Saul with scriptures. Prince Eshbaal returns to assume the throne because he expects the Philistines to defeat their army. David arrives at the camp and learns about Goliath. Eliab rebukes David for coming, but David volunteers to fight Goliath. King Saul summons David, who testifies to his experiences as a shepherd. Moved by David's conviction, King Saul chooses him to face Goliath. David and Princess Michal reunite, confessing their love for each other. Prince Jonathan finds and discovers David as the Lord God's anointed. David approaches Goliath, who dismisses David. David speaks of the Lord God's deliverance and declares his victory. David runs toward Goliath and Goliath throws his spears, striking David, though not fatally. Samuel appears on a plain above the battlefield. David rises and slings a single stone, striking Goliath on the forehead. After Goliath falls, David uses his sword to cut off his head. The Philistines flee, and the Israelites pursue them as David holds Goliath's sword.

=== Season 2 (2025) ===
No. overall	No. in season	Title	Directed by	Written by	Original release date
9	1	"A Tale of Two Swords"	Jon Erwin	Teleplay by : Erik Mountain; Story by : Jon Erwin & Jon Gunn	October 5, 2025
After killing Goliath with his slingshot, David beheads the Philistine giant. The invigorated Israelites attack the Philistine army, resulting in a fierce battle. The battle engulfs the Israelite camp with King Saul's daughter Mychal killing a Philistine soldier attempting to assault her sister Merab, drawing upon her father's combat lessons. David's brothers, Prince Jonathan and Eshbaal, also join the battle, pursuing the Philistines to the Gates of Gath. Tormented by a demonic apparition of the late King Agag, Saul attempts to fight the Philistine King Achish, who bests him in combat. He is saved by Jonathan. Samuel prays for the Israelite army during the battle, fighting off two Philistine soldiers. Following the battle, Saul and Jonathan honor David for killing Goliath. David's brother, Nethaneel, dies from his wounds but apologizes for mistreating his younger brother. Believing he has won the battle, Saul seeks out Samuel and attempts to force him to re-anoint him as king. When Samuel refuses, Saul orders his arrest. Abner tells his comrade to pass a message to Saul's commander, Joab.
10	2	"A Journey Home"	Jon Gunn	Laura Kenar	October 5, 2025
At Gibeah, the House of Saul have a heartfelt reunion. Saul forgives Eshbaal while Merab convinces her father to make amends for wrecking her courtship with Jordan of Judah. Meanwhile, Jonathan is treated by a common woman named Sara, who uses an experimental pair of forceps to removed an embedded blade from his chest. David and his brothers return to Bethlehem where they mourn the passing of Nethaneel. David's relationship with his older brother Eliab deteriorates after Joab arrives with news that Saul has appointed David as a commander of a thousand men. Jesse supports David's proposed marriage to Mychal as a means of improving their family fortunes. In captivity, Samuel resists attempts by Abner and Ahinoam to legitimise Saul's kingship. Ahinoam sends Doeg the Edomite to intimidate Samuel but the prophet exposes his complicity in his mother Timna's death at the hands of his abusive father, rendering Doeg in a catatonic state. Elsewhere, King Achish is visited by Dagonor, the King of Ashdod, who convinces him to arm the Philistines with iron swords. At the royal court, David and Mychal are surprised when Saul instead proposes her older sister Merab as David's bride.
11	3	"The Middle Path"	Jon Gunn	Jonathan Lloyd Walker	October 12, 2025
Eshbaal relates the story of his captivity and escape from a rich noble, who had attempted to force him into submission. Eshbaal claims that he killed his captor. King Saul sends Eshbaal along with Jonathan and David to negotiate with Yahir, the Danite tribal leader whose daughter is Dinah, the woman whom Eshbaal had sex with. Besides redeeming Eshbaal's affair, Saul intends to mend relations with Yahir and his clan. Meanwhile, Ahinoam and Abner arrange for the death of the medium who had attempted to cure Saul's madness in an attempt to cover their tracks. Relations between Mychal and Merab deteriorate after Mychal learns that Merab had convinced their father to marry her to David. Mychal protests Saul's decision but is overruled by her mother Ahinoam. David accompanies Jonathan and Eshbaal during their meeting with Yahir and Dinah. Dinah agrees to marry Eshbaal in return for being allowed to continue hunting and not being forced to produce an heir. While returning to Gibeah, the royal party is ambushed by unidentified brigands, who kill Yahir. Jonathan is almost strangled to death during the ambush but is saved by David. Following the death of her father, Dinah decides to continue with her planned marriage with Eshbaal. Saul discovers that Ahinoam secretly crowned Eshbaal while he was away and confines her to the palace.
12	4	"Road to Atonement"	Jeff T. Thomas	Ethan Reiff & Cyrus Voris	October 19, 2025
In a flashback scene, a younger David accompanies his family to the Ark of the Covenant encampment. However, the elders deny them entry due to his mother's status as a Gentile. Jesse counsels David to persevere in making things right with God despite what men think. In the present, David accompanies the House of Saul with the exception of Queen Ahinoam on their annual pilgrimage to the Ark of the Covenant for a sin offering. In an attempt to buy David's loyalty, Adriel had previously mislead Saul regarding the true identity of the anointed one. As a result of this lie, Joav orders Eliab to accompany him on a mission to Bethlehem to kill David's neighbor and his entire family. During the pilgrimage, David reluctantly pretends to be betrothed to Merab to maintain public confidence. At the encampment, Saul meets with Samuel and his wife but is unsuccessful in convincing Samuel to anoint him in the presence of the people but he refuses. Mychal decides to accept David's betrothal to her sister Merab but refuses to forgive her for stealing her lover. Armed with iron weapons, the Philistines launch raids on Israelite villagers, killing many people.
13	5	"God of Swords"	Jeff T. Thomas	Ethan Reiff & Cyrus Voris	October 26, 2025
A year after Goliath's death, the Israelites continue their war with the Philistines. David becomes a rising commander in the Israelite army, with the people praising him for killing tens of thousands of the enemy. However, the Philistines maintain an edge due to their iron swords. Seeking to recruit a blacksmith who can manufacture iron weapons, Abner leads an expedition including David, Eliab and Jonathan to Endor, which has a reputation for lawlessness. Abner recruits a blacksmith by promising to free his daughter from slavery. There, Abner encounters his mother, the Witch of Endor, who condemns him for betraying their kind. Through divination, she condemns Eliab for murdering Samuel's relatives and warns Jonathan that he will not become King of Israel. She also prophesies that David will become King but that his reign will be characterized by warfare. After returning to Gibeah, David tells Saul that he is unwilling to marry Merab due to his love for Mychal. Saul is angry and warns him about the consequences of disobedience. Meanwhile, Jonathan strengthens his relationship with Sara. A tormented Doeg is blackmailed by a servant girl named Keziah. Elsewhere, Dagonor kills another Philistine king and appoints the deceased king's son Hanun as the next king.
14	6	"Forged in Fire"	Lynsey Miller	Teleplay by : Erik Mountain; Story by : Laura Kenar	November 2, 2025
Following the events of the previous episode, Queen Ahinoam convinces her husband Saul to grant David's wish to marry Mychal by sending him on a mission to destroy an impregnable Philistine armory in Gath and deliver 100 Philistine foreskins. Unaware it is a suicide mission, David accepts the request due to his love for Mychal. Meanwhile, Jonathan marries Sara and later brings his new wife home. Saul decides to legitimise the marriage. Merab is bitter at David's refusal to marry her and jealous of Jonathan's marriage success. She contemplates suicide but Dinah talks her out of it. Ahinoam is jealous of Saul's concubine Keziah, a servant whom he elevates to the status of guest. Meanwhile, David and his soldiers including Uriah the Hittite enter the armory but discover it is a trap. Though the Philistines intend to trap them inside the burning fortress, David leads his men in fighting their way out and kills Dagonor. Israelite reinforcements led by Jonathan and Eliab rescue David and his soldiers. Following the battle, Saul is forced to allow David to marry Mychal, who announces the destruction of the armory and delivers 200 Philistine foreskins. An enraged Saul banishes Ahinoam from the royal palace.
15	7	"A Royal Wedding"	Lynsey Miller	Teleplay by : Jonathan Lloyd Walker; Story by : Jon Erwin & Jon Gunn	November 9, 2025
Five silos near the royal palace in Gibeah are destroyed during a Philistine raid. While hunting with Merab, Dinah discovers Doeg and two other cloaked men sending a pigeon with a message, which she shoots down. The House of Saul proceeds with the wedding of David and Mychal. Prior to the wedding, Merab mends relations with Mychal. Jesse is invited to the wedding but declines Saul and Abner's offer for royal favours. During the wedding, David rejects Adriel's offer to be his political adviser and learns about Eliab's role in the murder of Samuel's relatives. Adriel manipulates Eshbaal by revealing that Samuel had secretly anointed David and alleging that David seeks to supplant the royal family. After Dinah discloses the forest incident, Eshbaal murders her to conceal his collusion with Adriel and the Philistines. When Merab catches Eshbaal in the act, he convinces her to help him cover up Dinah's murder by saying that he is seeking to protect their family's interests. Merab tells the others that Dinah committed suicide because she was grieving her father's death. Under the influence of Eshbaal, Saul summons David to his chambers and confronts him about Samuel's anointment. When David says God chose him, an enraged Saul attacks him with a spear.
16	8	"The Truth Revealed"	Jon Gunn	Jon Erwin & Jon Gunn	November 16, 2025
David escapes Saul's murder attempt with the help of Mychal and his cousin Joab. In response, Saul and Eshbaal claim that David attempted to assassinate the King and brand him an enemy. Joab and his brother Eliab return to the home of their father Jesse and warn him that Saul has turned against David. Eliab is angry with David but makes peace with God and his brother. David tells Jonathan about Saul's murder attempt against him. Jonathan attempts to speak reason to his father but realizes that Saul has been consumed by the insanity of rejecting David as God's anointed one. Abner and Saul attempt to arrest Samuel but the prophet strikes them with God's power. David and his loyal soldiers seek refuge with Ahimelech and the priests in Nob, who offer them refreshments. After David and his followers leave, Saul orders Abner and his men to kill the priests for sheltering David and his followers but they refuse. Doeg and his troops instead massacre the priests. Joab and Eliab later join David and his followers. While the Philistines learn about David's falling out with Saul, Eshbaal brokers an alliance between his father and the Edomite King, who is revealed to have been the mysterious man who held him captive.

== Production ==
=== Development ===
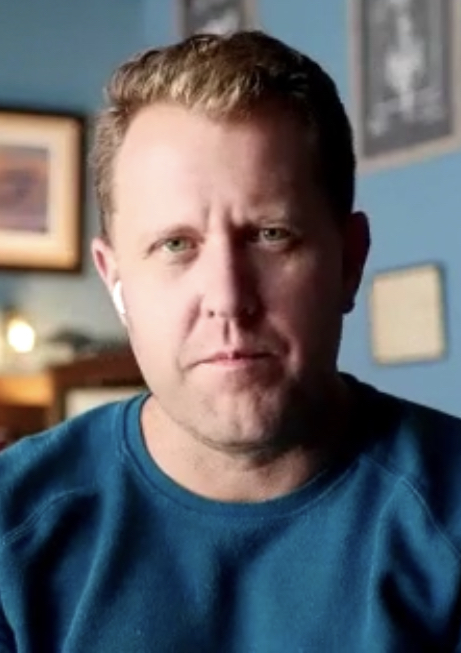
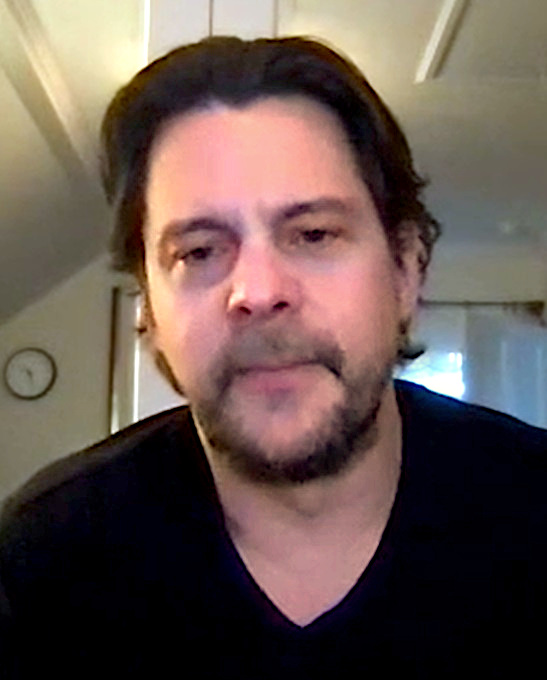
Jon Erwin and Jon Gunn both known for their work in faith-based cinema

The development of House of David was inspired by creator Jon Erwin's interest in the biblical story of King David. When Erwin was 16, he traveled to Israel with his father and visited King David's tomb in Jerusalem, which inspired him to adapt David's story for the screen. He later wrote his first script about David as a teenager and continued developing the project alongside his filmmaking career.

The series was produced by The Wonder Project, a studio founded by Erwin and Kelly Merryman Hoogstraten, in collaboration with Amazon MGM Studios. Erwin pitched House of David to Amazon, which subsequently developed the series as part of its faith-based programming.

=== Casting ===
The casting process for House of David involved a four-month international search for an actor to portray the titular role. Michael Iskander was cast as David, in what became his first major acting credit. According to Iskander, his experience competing in the shot put and discus in high school helped him during the audition process. Ali Suliman portrays King Saul, while Ayelet Zurer portrays Queen Ahinoam, Stephen Lang portrays the prophet Samuel, who anoints David and Martyn Ford was cast as Goliath. Ford, who is 6 feet 8 inches (2.03 m) tall and weighs around 320 pounds (145 kg), was portrayed as 9 feet 9 inches (2.97 m) tall in the series through digital effects.

The supporting cast includes Louis Ferreira as Jesse, David's father; Ethan Kai as Jonathan, Saul's son; Indy Lewis as Michal, Saul's daughter; Oded Fehr as Abner, Saul's military commander; Yali Topol Margalith as Mirab, Saul's daughter; Nimo Hochenberg as Silas, Samuel's servant; Aury Alby as Joab; Ashraf Barhom as Doeg the Edomite; Sam Otto as Eshbaal, one of Saul's sons; Davood Ghadami as Eliab, David's eldest brother; Alexander Uloom as Achish, a Philistine king; Raresh DiMofte as Lahmi; and Siir Tilif as Nitzevet, David's mother.

=== Writing ===
The first season was based on a script Erwin wrote about David's life in 2012. With Jon Gunn serving as co-writers of the series, having previously worked together with Erwin on Jesus Revolution. The script was planned to cover three seasons, with the first season covering the first part of the story. The series was intended to remain faithful to Scripture while using interpretation to fill gaps in the biblical account. Erwin described it as "[a] love letter to the source material". Erwin consulted Christian and Jewish scholars during its development to help with parts of David's life that are not detailed in Scripture.

=== Principal photography ===
Principal photography for House of David began in April 1, 2024 to December 31, 2024, with filming taking place primarily in Greece, with additional filming taking place in Alberta, Canada. Locations in Greece included Saronikos, Markopoulo Mesogaias, Lavreotiki, Fyli, Xylokastro, Zagori, and Konitsa. Locations in Greek were used to depict the series' ancient setting, while Alberta provided additional landscapes. The production team initially scouted locations in Morocco, Jordan, Italy, and Israel before choosing Greece as the primary filming location. Gunn said the production chose Greece for its landscapes and historical sites. And 700 people were involved in the production.

The show's cinematography was heavily inspired by the visual style of The Creator. Filmed entirely on the Sony FX3 with a 2:1 extraction, season 1 used Atomos external recorders for ProRes RAW capture and DJI RS4 gimbals, regularly shooting with multiple cameras at once.

Generative artificial intelligence was used in combination with traditional special effects to create an origin sequence for Goliath (season 1, episode 6). Erwin stated that AI made the scene grander and more detailed than their time and budget would allow using only regular tools. Erwin experimented with several generative AI tools, including Midjourney, Magnific, Topaz, Runway and Kling, using them alongside traditional tools such as Unreal Engine, Nuke, Adobe Photoshop and After Effects. The tools were used in the production of the Goliath origin sequence in the sixth episode, including for visual effects such as digital characters, rain, smoke, wind and other environmental elements. Variety reported that the first season incorporated 72 shots involving AI. Season 2 would see a fivefold increase in AI-generated shots. As many as 350–400 shots made use of AI, including over 100 used for virtual production LED panel environments.

Production for season 2 began in Greece over Easter weekend in 2025. Production of season 3 began in Greece in September 2026.

=== Music ===
The music for the television series House of David was composed by Kevin Kiner along with his children, Sean and Deana. The trio has previously worked on series such as Star Wars: The Clone Wars and Narcos: Mexico.

For House of David, their composition incorporates a blend of traditional Middle Eastern instrumentation and contemporary orchestral elements, aiming to align with the historical setting while appealing to modern audiences. The series' official soundtrack, House of David: Season One, was released digitally on February 27, 2025, to coincide with the show's premiere.

Additionally, a compilation album titled Music Inspired by the Prime Video Original Series "House of David" features songs from various artists that complement the themes of the series. The album was made available for pre-save on February 21, 2025.

== Release ==
The series premiered on February 27, 2025, with the first three episodes made available for streaming. New episodes were released weekly on Thursdays Prime Video, with the season finale airing on April 3, 2025.

Season 2 debuted on October 5, 2025, initially as an exclusive to subscribers to the Wonder Project add-on to Amazon Prime Video. It was released to all Amazon Prime subscribers on March 27, 2026.

== Reception ==
=== Viewership ===
House of David debuted at No. 3 on Amazon Prime Video’s streaming charts and rose to No. 2 during its first week on the platform’s most-watched list. The series later reached No. 1 following the release of its finale episode. It drew 22 million viewers within its first 17 days in the US, after which Amazon Prime Video renewed the series for a second season. The series had reached more than 44 million viewers worldwide at the time of the season 2 release.

=== Critical response ===
The series has received a range of reviews from critics. On review aggregator Rotten Tomatoes, 71% of 7 critics gave the series a positive review, with an average rating of 7/10. The Gospel Coalition praised House of David for maintaining a balance between narrative engagement and biblical accuracy. The review highlights how the multi-season format allows for more in-depth character development compared to feature films. Similarly, Leah MarieAnn Klett of The Christian Post described the series as "visually stunning and spiritually rich", commending its high production values and performances. She notes that the show effectively blends biblical accuracy with compelling drama, making the story accessible to contemporary audiences.

Alison Herman of Variety critiqued House of David for its lack of depth, calling it "wooden and cheap-looking" despite Amazon's investment in biblical epics. Acknowledging its positioning as a prequel to The Chosen, the review cites inconsistent accents, unconvincing special effects, and a lack of emotional engagement to ultimately consider the show uninspired, failing to develop compelling characters or match the intrigue of historical dramas like Shōgun. Martin Carr of Comic Book Resources described House of David as a "sweeping biblical epic" that embraces a grand storytelling approach. He highlighted the series' exploration of political power struggles and divine intervention, crafting a narrative of triumph against overwhelming odds that resonates with contemporary audiences.

Joel Keller of Decider acknowledged its attempt to present biblical figures with greater depth but argues that it falls short, stating that the characters "appear more like mythical figures rather than relatable humans" and describing the tone as "dull and uninspiring". Batya Ungar-Sargon of The Free Press called the series "phenomenal" and praised its depiction of Jewish traditions: "The show's most important contribution is in exposing liberal American Jews to the way so many of our Christian neighbors see us—not as an oppressed victim caste who killed Christ and should be loathed for it, but rather as an ancient, noble tribe of warrior poets and kings favored by the blessing of the God they serve."

== Awards and nominations ==
Award	Year	Category	Result	Ref(s)
K-Love Fan Awards	2025	TV/Streaming Impact Award	Won	
56th GMA Dove Awards	2025	Television Series of the Year	Nominated	
56th GMA Dove Awards	2025	Christmas/Special Event Album of the Year for House Of David (Music Inspired By The Prime Video Original Series)	Nominated	
Directors Guild of Canada	2025	Outstanding Directorial Achievement in Dramatic Series	Won	
Directors Guild of Canada	2025	Best Production Design - Dramatic Series & Mini-Series	Nominated	
Movieguide Awards	2026	Faith & Freedom Award Television- Episode 208: “The Truth Revealed”	Won	
K-Love Fan Awards	2026	TV/Streaming Impact award	Won	
57th GMA Dove Awards	2026	Television Series of the Year	Nominated	
