= Nitzevet =

Mother of David according to Hanan bar Rava

Nitzevet bat Adael (Hebrew: נִצֶּבֶת בַּת עַדְאֵל Nīṣṣeḇeṯ baṯ ʿAḏʾēl lit. Nitzevet daughter of Adael) is, according to Hanan bar Rava, the mother of David. According to the Bible, her husband, Jesse, had at least nine children: David, Eliab, Abinadab, Shimma, Nethaneel, Raddai, Ozem, Zeruiah, and Abigail.

== In the Bible ==
Zeruiah and Abigail are mentioned in the Bible (2 Sam. 17:25), "Amasa was the son of a man named Jether, an Israelite who had married Abigail, the daughter of Nahash and sister of Zeruiah the mother of Joab." However, since this text would indicate that the father of Abigail and Zeruiah is Nahash rather than Jesse, it would appear that their mother, whose name is unmentioned, married Jesse after the death of Nahash (2 Sam. 10, 1 Sam. 11). Therefore, these women are not Jesse's daughters but half-sisters of David through Nahash's widow. It is not clear if this widow is the same Netzevet unless you conclude that she is indeed the mother of Zeruiah and Abigail as well.

Although David's mother is not named in the Bible, she is still mentioned there with her husband: when David was worried about the safety of his parents, he went to Mizpah in Moab to ask permission from the king to allow his father and mother to stay under the royal protection of the king:

And David went thence to Mizpeh of Moab; and he said unto the king of Moab: 'Let my father and my mother, I pray thee, come forth, and be with you, till I know what God will do for me.'

— 1 Samuel 22:3-4

In a few Bible translations, Psalm 86:16 (attributed to David) mentions the writer's mother:

Show that you hear me and be kind to me.
I am your servant, so give me strength.
I am your slave, as my mother was, so save me! — Psalms 86:16

== In popular culture ==
Nitzevet is portrayed by the actress Siir Tilif in the 2025 television series House of David. In the 2025 film David, she was portrayed by Miri Mesika. The portrayal of Nitzevet as a Moabite woman in the context of the series, appears as an allusion to the Book of Ruth.
