= Abigail (mother of Amasa) =

In the Hebrew Bible, the mother of Amasa

According to the Hebrew Bible, Abigail (Hebrew: אֲבִיגַיִל, romanized: ʾAḇīḡayīl) was the mother of Amasa, the commander-in-chief of Absalom's army (2 Samuel 17:25).

2 Samuel 17:25 refers to Abigail as a sister of Zeruiah and therefore an aunt to Joab. In the Books of Chronicles (1 Chronicles 2:13–16), Abigail and Zeruiah are referred to as sisters to David. The Masoretic Text of 2 Samuel 17:25 calls Abigail the daughter of Nahash. While it is possible that Jesse's wife had been married first to Nahash (and Abigail was David's half-sister), scholars think that Nahash is a typographic error, based on the appearance of the name two verses later.

According to the medieval commentator Rashi, "Nahash" refers to Jesse. Because he never sinned, he only died because of Adam's sin with the serpent, so he was called Nahash, meaning serpent.

In Chronicles, Amasa's father is Jether the Ishmaelite, but in the Books of Samuel, Amasa's father is Ithra the Israelite; scholars think that the latter case is more likely.

Jon Levenson and Baruch Halpern suggest that Abigail, mother of Amasa may, in fact, be the same Abigail who became David's wife. Richard M. Davidson, however, points out that "on the basis of the final form of the OT canon, references to Abigail in the biblical accounts indicate two different individuals."
