= Jesse (biblical figure) =

Biblical figure; father of the Israelite king David

Jesse 𐤉𐤔𐤉 יִשַי
- Spouse: Nizzebeth (acc. Judaism)
- Children: David; Eliab; Abinadab; Shimma; Nathanel; Raddai; Ozem; Zeruiah; Abigail
- Father: Obed

Righteous, the father of King David
- Hometown: Bethlehem
- Honored in: Catholic Church; Eastern Orthodox Church
- Feast: December 29 (Roman Catholic), December 26 and January 2 (Eastern Orthodox)

Jesse (/ˈdʒɛsi/ JESS-ee; Hebrew: יִשַי, romanized: yishay) or Yishai (Note: Hebrew: יִשַׁי, romanized: Yīšay, lit. 'God exists' or 'God's gift', in pausa יִשָׁי, Yīšāy; Syriac: ܐܝܫܝ, romanized: Eshai – ; Greek: Ἰεσσαί, romanized: Iessaí; Latin: Issai, Isai, Jesse; Arabic: إيشا, romanized: ʾīshā) (Note: In 1 Chronicles 2:13 only, the Hebrew name is Hebrew: אִישַׁי – ʾĪšay.) is a figure described in the Hebrew Bible as the father of David, who became the king of the Israelites. His son David is sometimes called simply "Son of Jesse" (Ben Yishai). The role as both father of King David and ancestor of Jesus has been used in various depictions in art, poetry and music e.g. as the Tree of Jesse or in hymns like "Lo, how a rose e'er blooming."

== Biblical background ==
=== Narrative ===
According to the Bible, Jesse was the son of Obed and the grandson of Ruth and of Boaz. He lived in Bethlehem, in Judah, and was of the Tribe of Judah, he was a farmer, breeder and owner of sheep. He was a prominent resident of the town of Bethlehem. Jesse is important in Judaism because he was the father of the most famous King of Israel. He is important in Christianity, in part because he is in the Old Testament and mentioned in the genealogy of Jesus. Later rabbinic traditions name him as one of four ancient Israelites who died without sin, the other three being Benjamin, Chileab and Amram.

The Book of Samuel indicates Jesse had eight sons, naming the first three as Eliab, Abinadab and Shammah, among seven who appeared at a feast as they waited for David, the youngest. The Book of Chronicles oddly only names seven sons of Jesse—Eliab, Abinadab, Shimea, Nethanel, Raddai, Ozem and David—as well as two daughters, Zeruiah and Abigail—but later lists an Elihu as a chief of the tribe, though it is unclear whether this is another name for Eliab, the firstborn, or whether this is David's next older brother, one not listed in the earlier genealogy. Among Jesse's grandchildren were the three sons of Zeruiah: Abishai, Joab and Asahel; and Amasa, the son of Abigail.

One day God sent the prophet Samuel to Bethlehem to anoint the next king of Israel. Ostensibly, his visit to Bethlehem was to offer a sacrifice; the ruse God provided to get past King Saul's jealous suspicion. Samuel offered a sacrifice with Jesse and then went to his house, where he sanctified him and his family. The prophet asked Jesse to present his sons. When Samuel saw Eliab, Jesse's eldest son, he was impressed by his stature and convinced that he must be God's anointed king, however, God said to Samuel, "Do not consider his appearance or his height, for I have rejected him. The LORD does not look at the things man looks at. Man sees only the outward appearance, but the LORD sees the heart" (1 Samuel 16:7 NIV). When Jesse presented his second son, Abinadab, God told Samuel, "The LORD has not chosen this one either" (1 Samuel 16:8 NIV). This happened again with his third son, Shammah, then his fourth, fifth, sixth and seventh sons. Finally, Samuel inquired of Jesse if he had any other sons. Jesse told him that David the youngest was tending the flock. The prophet then asked for him to be brought in from tending the sheep. Samuel waited, and when he arrived God asked the prophet to anoint David as king over Israel (1 Samuel 16:13).

Some time later, Saul, suffering from depression and melancholy, asked Jesse for his son David to play the harp for him, since he had heard that David played the harp beautifully. Jesse sent his son along with some gifts for the King. The King was so taken with David's harp playing that he asked Jesse to keep him in his court to play for him whenever he was depressed. Later on Jesse sent his son David with gifts to be given to his older brothers who were to fight in the war against the Philistines, in Saul's army. Years later David fled to the desert away from Saul, who sought to kill David in order for him to stay in power and not have his throne be taken away from him. David, worried about the safety of his parents, went to Mizpah in Moab, to ask permission from the King to allow his father Jesse and his mother to stay under the royal protection of the King. They stayed there until David's fortunes took a turn for the better.

=== Christian and Bahá'í prophecy ===
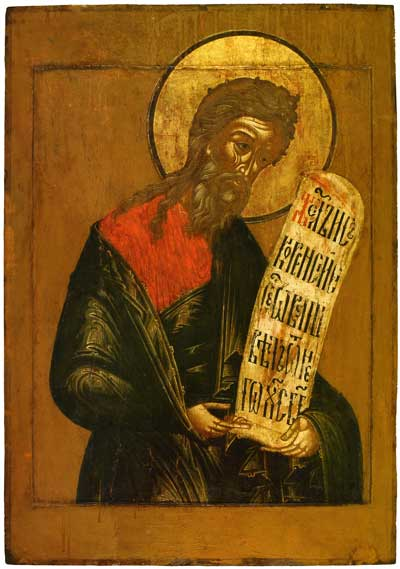
Russian icon

The name Jesse is referenced in the Old Testament, and in particular the passages of the Book of Isaiah, Chapter 11, Verses 1–3:

1. And there shall come forth a shoot from the stump of Jesse, and a branch shall grow out of his roots. 2. And the Spirit of the LORD shall rest upon him, the spirit of wisdom and understanding, the spirit of counsel and might, the spirit of knowledge and the fear of the LORD. 3. And his delight shall be in the fear of the LORD. He shall not judge by what his eyes see, or decide by what his ears hear;

Also Chapter 11, Verse 10:

10. In that day the root of Jesse shall stand as an ensign to the peoples; him shall the nations seek, and his dwellings shall be glorious.

These are two of the verses regarded by Christians as prophecy of the advent of Jesus, whom they consider to be the Christ and Messiah. These two prophecies are regarded by Bahá'ís as referring to Bahá'u'lláh, alleged to also have arisen from "the stump of Jesse". These prophecies are also regarded in Latter-Day Saint Movement about the coming Root of Jesse, an ensign who holds special priesthood keys and a gathering of the Lord's people.

== Tomb of Jesse ==
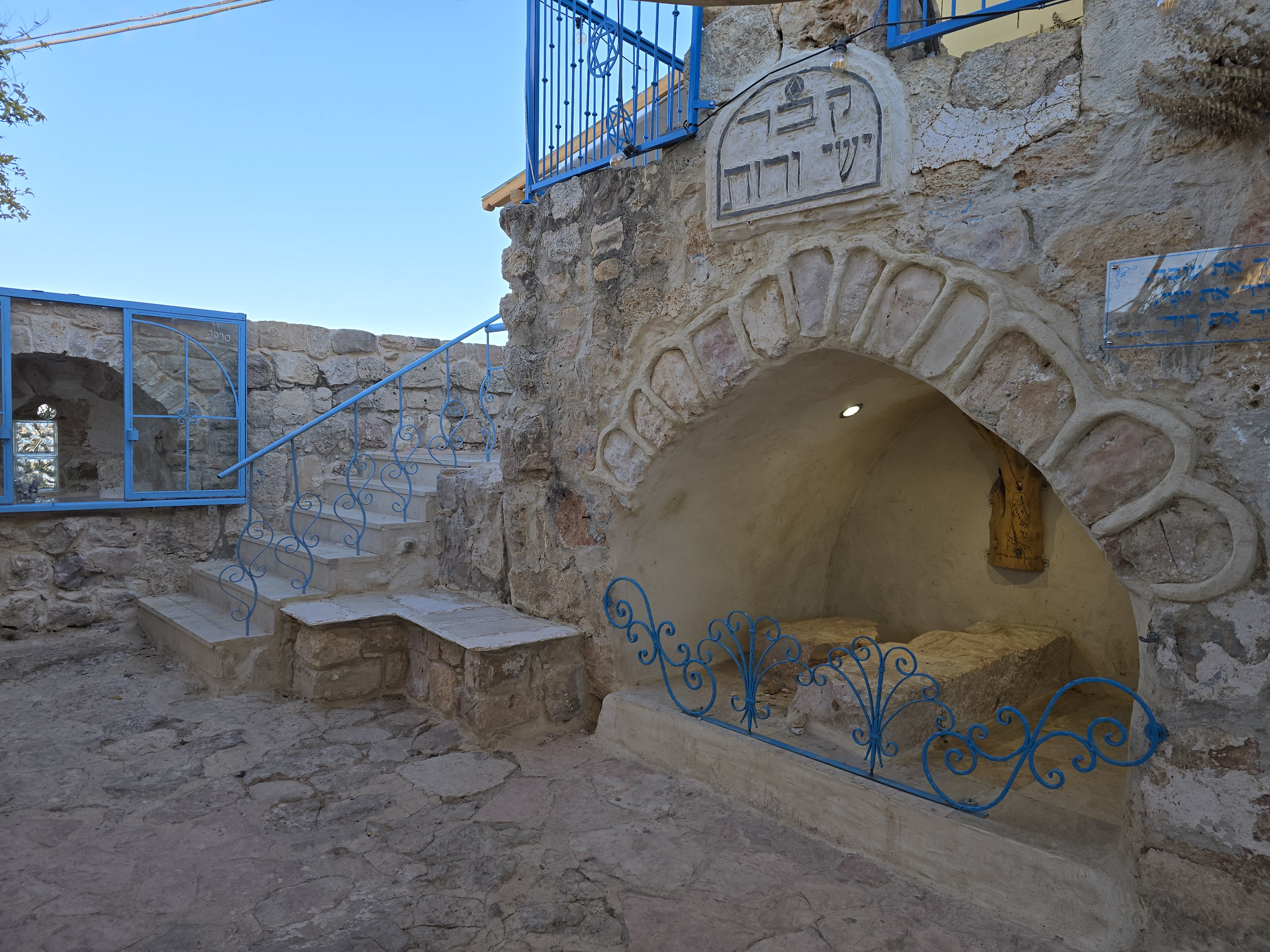
Tomb of Jesse and Ruth in Hebron

The Tomb of Ruth and Jesse is an old stone structure on a hilltop in Hebron which today serves as a synagogue. It receives numerous visitors every year, especially on the Jewish holiday of Shavuot when the Book of Ruth is read. The 1537 book Yihus HaAvot V'Neviim (Lineage of the Patriarch and the Prophets) describes the tomb as "a handsome building up on the mount, where Jesse, the King David's father is buried." It includes a drawing of the site, and notes an "ancient Israelite burial ground" nearby and Crusader courtyard. Rabbi Moshe Basola wrote in his travel journal that the site houses a cave which connects to the Tomb of Machpela, an assertion postulated by many over the years. The site was refurbished in 2009. Later on the site underwent major structural restoration, including reinforcement of stone walls and ceilings, installation of tiled flooring, and the addition of modern amenities such as air conditioning and running water. The surrounding area was also developed with landscaped gardens and visitor facilities to accommodate large numbers of pilgrims. In May 2025, the site’s religious infrastructure was further completed with the dedication of its first purpose-written Torah scroll and the installation of a large ceremonial mezuzah at the entrance.

- List of people named Jesse
- Nitzevet
