= Indy Lewis =

British actress

- Born: 2001 (age 24–25); Chelsea, London, England
- Occupation: Actress
- Years active: 2018–present
- Relatives: Ashani Lewis (sister)

Indy Lewis (born 2001 or 2002) is a British actress. She is known for her roles in the BBC Two and HBO series Industry (2020–present), the AMC series La Fortuna (2021), and the Amazon Prime series House of David (2025).

== Early life and education ==
Indy Lewis was born in Chelsea, London, the daughter of a judge and a barrister, and grew up in Kingston upon Thames. She is of Welsh and Sri Lankan descent. Her older sister is the writer Ashani Lewis.

Lewis attended the Tiffin Girls' School. She intended to study international relations at Durham University, but took a gap year, during which she applied to drama school and earned a place at the (now defunct) Academy of Live and Recorded Arts (ALRA). She switched from the three-year degree programme to the year-long foundation course in order to make time for her career.

== Career ==
Lewis was 18 when she auditioned for what was initially a guest role in the first season of the BBC Two and HBO investment banking drama Industry, which premiered in 2020. Her character Venetia Berens was promoted to series regular for the second season in 2022. Lewis also played Amy Wild in the Spanish-American AMC and Movistar+ adventure series La Fortuna starring the likes of Stanley Tucci and T'Nia Miller.

In 2025 Lewis appeared as Margaret in the BBC One medieval drama King & Conqueror, and in the Amazon Prime biblical series House of David as Mychal.Taking on her role in House of David, Lewis immersed herself in the biblical setting of ancient Israel, as daughter of King Saul and Queen Ahinoam, and King David’s lover.” Lewis continued in the role in the show's second and third seasons, following its renewal for both seasons.

On 25 June 2026, it was announced that she was cast to play the character Lizzie Young in the Amazon Prime Video television adaptation of the Boys of Tommen book series, written by Chloe Walsh.

== Filmography ==
Year	Title	Role	Notes
2017	Say No	Student	Short film
2018	On the Outside	Cara Clearwater	Short film
2020–2024	Industry	Venetia Berens	Guest, series 1; main role, series 2–3
2021	La Fortuna	Amy Wild	5 episodes
2025	The Game	Margot Miller	Miniseries, 3 episodes
2025	King & Conqueror	Margaret, based on Edith of Mercia	5 episodes
2025–present	House of David	Michal	Main role
2027	Boys of Tommen	Lizzie Young	Upcoming
