= Ashani Lewis =

English writer

- Born: Ashani Priya Lewis c. 1998
- Education: Robinson College, Cambridge
- Family: Indy Lewis (sister)

Ashani Priya Lewis (born c. 1998) is an English writer. She began her career writing poetry and short fiction, winning the Tower Poetry Prize and the Alpine Fellowship Writing Prize among other accolades. Her debut novel Winter Animals (2024) won both a Somerset Maugham Award and the Betty Trask Prize, while her short story collection Everest (2024) was shortlisted for a Jhalak Prize.

== Early life ==
Lewis is the older sister of actress Indy Lewis, of Welsh and Sri Lankan Tamil heritage. The two sisters attended the Tiffin Girls' School in Kingston upon Thames. Lewis graduated with a degree in English from Robinson College, Cambridge in 2019.

== Career ==
Lewis was shortlisted for Amnesty International UK's 2014 Young Reporter Award. Lewis' poem "Wonder" won the First Prize at the 2016 Tower Poetry competition. Her short stories "Identity" and "Farewell Bend" won first prize at the 2019 Alpine Fellowship Writing Prize and the Young Writers Award at the 2020 Bedford International Writing Festival respectively. Lewis was selected for Spread the Word's 2021 London Writers Awards in the literary fiction category, where she worked on her debut novel. Her short story "Threads" was a runner-up for the 2021 Harper's Bazaar Short Story Competition.

In April 2023, Lewis signed her first book deal with Dialogue Books (a Hachette UK imprint) for two novels and a short story collection. Through this, Lewis' debut novel Winter Animals and short story collection Everest were both published in 2024. Everest was shortlisted for the 2025 Jhalak Prize in the inaugural Prose category and an editors' pick for the best books of 2024 in Marie Claire UK. Winter Animals won both a Somerset Maugham Award and the Betty Trask Prize. Lewis was the only author to win multiple Society of Authors (SoA) Awards that year.

The second novel under Lewis' Dialogue Books deal titled Suckerfish was published in 2026.

== Bibliography ==
=== Novels ===
- Winter Animals (2024)
- Suckerfish (2026)

=== Short stories ===
Collections

- Everest (2024)

Select stories

- "Identity"
- "Farewell Bend"
- "Threads"
- "Break Up Fantasies"

== Accolades ==
Year	Award	Category	Title	Result	Ref.
2014	Young Reporter Award			Shortlisted	
2016	Christopher Tower Poetry Prize		"Wonder"	1st	
2019	Alpine Fellowship	Writing Prize	"Identity"	1st	
2020	Bedford International Writing Competition	Young Writers Prize	"Farewell Bend"	Won	
2021	Harper's Bazaar Short Story Competition		"Threads"	Runner-up	
2025	Jhalak Prize	Prose	Everest	Shortlisted	
2025	Society of Authors	Betty Trask Prize	Winter Animals	Won	
2025	Society of Authors	Somerset Maugham Award	Winter Animals	Won	
