= Yali Topol Margalith =

Israeli actress (born 2000)

- יהלי מרגלית טופול
- Margalith in 2026
- Born: 15 March 2000 (age 26); Israel
- Occupation: Actress
- Years active: 2008–present
- Relatives: Chaim Topol (grandfather)

Yali Topol Margalith (Hebrew: יהלי מרגלית טופול; born 15 March 2000) is an Israeli actress. She is best known for her roles as Lauren Gibson on the BBC's A Good Girl's Guide to Murder and as Mirab on House of David on Prime Video.

== Life ==
Born in Israel, Margalith is the second-born of three children, and the eldest daughter of Dror Margalith (a music arranger) and Adi Topol (an actress). Her maternal grandfather was the actor Chaim Topol, who played Tevye in the 1971 film version of Fiddler on the Roof.

Margalith's family moved to London when she was 12. She obtained a Bachelors of Arts in Performance from the Mountview Academy of Theatre Arts in London in 2022.

Margalith has been in a relationship with Austrian actor and choreographer Timo Tatzber since 2020.

== Career ==
As a child, Margalith began her career dubbing characters from films and television shows into the Hebrew language. Her most notable film dubbing roles include Kung Fu Panda 2, Planet 51 and Up.

Margalith played the role of Anna in the original London cast of The Band's Visit in 2022. Her first screen role was as Cilka in the 2024 miniseries The Tattooist of Auschwitz, starring Harvey Keitel. She played Lauren Gibson in the first season of the BBC's A Good Girl's Guide to Murder, and King Saul's eldest daughter Mirab in the first season of the Prime Video biblical drama series House of David. Margalith will reprise her roles in season two of A Good Girl's Guide to Murder and season two of House of David.

On May 22, 2025, it was announced that Margalith had been cast as Izzy in the upcoming six-part Disney+ series Alice and Steve, alongside Nicola Walker and Jemaine Clement. In 2026, she joined the cast of the second series of Down Cemetery Road.

== Filmography ==
=== Film ===
| Year | Title | Role | Notes |
|---|---|---|---|
| 2026 | Finding Emily | Emily Palmer | |

=== Television ===
| Year | Title | Role | Notes |
|---|---|---|---|
| 2024 | The Tattooist of Auschwitz | Cilka | Season 1 (4 episodes) |
| 2024–present | A Good Girl's Guide to Murder | Lauren Gibson | Series 1 and 2 |
| 2024-25 | House of David | Mirab | Seasons 1 and 2 |
| 2026 | Alice and Steve | Izzy | Season 1 |
| | Down Cemetery Road | | Season 2 (in post-production) |
