= Alice Bach =

American feminist biblical scholar

Alice Bach (6 April 1942 - 21 November 2022) was an American feminist biblical scholar. She was Archbishop Hallinan Professor Emerita of Religious Studies at Case Western Reserve University.

== Biography ==
Alice Bach was born 6 April 1942, in New York City. She studied at Barnard College.

Bach initially worked in New York City as an editor at a number of different publishing companies.

She was an author of more than 20 children's books. Her novel Mollie Make Believe was one of The New York Times best books of 1974, while Waiting for Johnny Miracle was listed as a Notable Book by the American Library Association.

Bach taught creative writing for two years at New York University's School for Continuing Education. After graduating from Union Theological Seminary, she taught religious studies at Stanford University and Case Western Reserve University.

In the field of biblical studies, Bach is best known for her work on the characterization of biblical women and the use of the Bible in the media. Bach has also served as an editor of the Union Seminary Quarterly Review, Biblicon, and Biblical Interpretation.

After retiring from academia, Bach became a blogger and activist who devoted herself to raising awareness of the Palestinian cause for freedom.

== Selected works ==
- Moses' ark : stories from the Bible , 1989
- Miriam's well : stories about women in the Bible, 1991
- Women, seduction, and betrayal in biblical narrative, 1997
- Women in the Hebrew Bible : a reader, 1998

=== Children's books ===
- Mollie Make Believe, 1974
- The smartest bear and his brother Oliver, 1975
- The meat in the sandwich, 1975
- The most delicious camping trip ever, 1976
- Waiting for Johnny Miracle : a novel, 1980

== See also ==
- Christian feminism
