= Alan Jenkins (poet) =

English poet

- Born: 1955 (age 70–71); Kingston upon Thames, England
- Education: London Nautical School
- Alma mater: University of Sussex
- Writing career
- Genre: Poetry
- Notable awards: Eric Gregory Award, Forward Poetry Prize, Cholmondeley Award

Alan Jenkins (born 1955) is an English poet.

== Life ==
Jenkins was born in Kingston upon Thames, Surrey, brought up on the outskirts of London in Richmond, and educated at the University of Sussex. He has worked for The Times Literary Supplement since 1980, first as poetry and fiction editor, and then as deputy editor. He was also a poetry critic for The Observer, and the Sunday Independent from 1985 to 1990. He edited Essential Reading: Selected Poems of Peter Reading, 1986, and Collected Poems of Ian Hamilton, 2009.

He has taught creative writing for the Bread Loaf Writers' Conference, Arvon Foundation, the Poetry Society, London, and at the American University in Paris. He was a judge for the Christopher Tower Poetry Prizes. From 2015 to 2018 he was Poet in Residence at St. John's College, University of Cambridge.

== Awards and honours ==
- 1981 Eric Gregory Award
- 1994 Forward Poetry Prize, for Harm
- 2000 shortlisted for the T. S. Eliot Prize, Poetry Book Society Choice, for The Drift
- 2002 Elected Fellow of the Royal Society of Literature
- 2005 shortlisted for the Forward Poetry Prize, for A Shorter Life
- 2006 Cholmondeley Award

== Works ==
=== Poetry ===
- In the Hot-House. Chatto & Windus. 1988. ISBN 9780701133122. OCLC 993149576.
- Greenheart. Chatto & Windus. 1990.
- Harm. Chatto & Windus. 1994.
- The Drift. Chatto & Windus. 2000.
- A Short History of Snakes: New and Collected Poems. Grove Press. 2001. ISBN 978-0-8021-3811-8. OCLC 45714829.
- The Little Black Book. Illustrated by Robert McNab. Cargo Press. 2001. ISBN 9781899980093. OCLC 49949173.
- A Shorter Life. Chatto & Windus. 2005. ISBN 9780701178086. OCLC 57200164.
- Drunken Boats. Illustrated by William Pownall. Sylph Editions/AUP. 2008. ISBN 9780955296345. OCLC 185081766.
- The Lost World. Clutag Press. 2010.
- Blue Days. Illustrated by William Pownall. Redstone Press. 2010.
- Revenants. Clutag Press. 2013.
- Paper-Money Lyrics. Grey Suit Editions. 2014.
- Marine (with John Kinsella). Enitharmon. 2015.
- Five Poems. Clutag Press. 2015.
- White Nights. Sheep Meadow Press. 2018.
- Tidemarks. New Walk Editions. 2018.
- The Ghost Net. New Walk Editions. 2023.
