= Tower Poetry =

Tower Poetry is an organisation affiliated with Christ Church, Oxford that aims to promote the reading and writing of poetry in young people. The group is funded by a donation from the late Christopher Tower, and run by Oxford University lecturer, Dr Anna Nickerson.

Tower Poetry runs the annual Christopher Tower Poetry Prizes (also known as the Tower Poetry Competition) and the biennial Tower Poetry Summer School, a residential course for 18- to 23-year-olds, held at Christ Church.

== Christopher Tower Poetry Prizes ==
The Christopher Tower Poetry Prizes are annual prizes awarded to young poets in education in the United Kingdom between the ages of 16 and 18, for poems submitted on a set theme. The prizes are administered by Christ Church, Oxford, and are funded by a bequest by the late Christopher Tower. Since their launch in 2000, the prizes have become recognised as one of the United Kingdom's most prestigious poetry awards for young writers. Several past winners and runners-up have gone on to win other major poetry competitions, such as the Eric Gregory Award, and to publish collections.

=== Past winners and runners-up ===
Year	Theme	First prize	Second prize	Third prize	Runners-up	Guest Judges
2001	Blue	Rebecca Dudley	Mairi Brewis	Felicity Marks	Eve Blair, Swithun Cooper, Charlotte Dickens, Isabella Mead	Andrew Motion and Paul Muldoon
2002	Floods	Anna Lewis	Dhruv Sookhoo	Thom Glover	Christopher Edwards, Kezia Gaitskell, Holly Patterson	Kathleen Jamie and Ruth Padel
2003	Passport	Aruna Nair	Wing Ying Chow	Hannah Briggs	James Williams, Tim Smith-Laing, Sarah Henderson	Lavinia Greenlaw and Anthony Thwaite
2004	Early Morning	Katherine Hindley	Nancy Freeman	Laura Tisdale	Caroline Bird, Joanna Moorman, Helen Mort	Frank Ormsby and Jon Stallworthy
2005	Gravity	Eley Williams	Craig Farrell	Miranda Cichy	Francesca Beasley, Rebecca Hawkes, Shin Woo Kang	Gillian Clarke and Philip Pullman
2006	A Building	Colette Sensier	Alice Malin	Alice Alexandre	David Devanny, Charlotte Geater, Julia Rampen	Mark Ford and Carol Rumens
2007	Flight	Charlotte Runcie	Annie Katchinska	Sophie Mackintosh	Alice Howlett, Laura Marsh, Rees Arnott Davies	Jo Shapcott and Francine Stock
2008	Change	Emily Middleton	Ashley McMullin	Nina Bahadur	Richard O’Brien, Charlotte Geater, Amelia Penny, Anna Savory	Simon Armitage and Alan Jenkins
2009	Doubt	Timothy Carson	Iona Twiston-Davies	Paul Merchant	Charlotte Turner, Sophie Stephenson-Wright, Emma Jourdan, Bethany Aitman	Jane Draycott and Daljit Nagra
2010	Promises	Emily Harrison	Katie Woods	Megan Owens	Jamie Sutherland, Julia Goroszeniuk, Hugo Havranek	Stephen Romer and Michael Schmidt
2011	Simplicity	Elizabeth Johnson	Jack Westmore	Abigail Richards	James Browning, Thomas Fraser, Molly Underwood	Frances Leviston and David Morley
2012	Voyages	Sarah Fletcher	Bethan Smith	Millie Guille	Hannah Tran, Lucy Hely-Hutchinson, Jack Whitehead	Don Paterson and Christopher Reid
2013	The Details	Azfa Ali	Sarah Fletcher	Erin Tunney	Kathryn Cussons, Luke van den Barselaar, Eva Wallace	Carrie Etter and Bernard O'Donoghue
2014	News	Dominic Hand	Sam Buckton	Masha Voyles	Alexander Shaw, Charlie Holmes, Jessica Matthews, Phoebe Stuckes	Olivia McCannon and Kei Miller
2015	Cells	Isla Anderson	Max Thomas	Lewis Harrington	Jeremiah Ovenden, Matt Ward, Andrew Wells	Ian McMillan and Helen Mort
2016	Wonder	Ashani Lewis	Safah Ahmed	Sophia West	Natasha Blinder, Ed Pryor, Grace Fraser	Alan Gillis and Katherine Rundell
2017	Stone	Ella Standage	Annie Fan	Rachel Oyawale	Freya Gray Stone, Flora Barber, Sofia Al-Hussaini	Vahni Capildeo and Sarah Howe
2018	Secrets'	Taraneh Peryie	Lucy Thynne	Robbi Sher	Ziqi Yan, Miranda Green, Annie Fan	Christopher Reid and John Fuller
2019	Underwater	Lucy Prescott	Lucy Thynne	Joseph Harrison	Isobel Falk, Anjali Mulcock, Flora Rugman	Angela Leighton and Vidyan Ravinthiran
2020	Trees	Nadia Lines	Fiyinfoluwa Timothy Oladipo	Ahana Banerji	Joyce Chen, Toby Morrison, Zara Meadows, Sabrina Coghlan-Jasiewicz	A.E. Stallings and Rebecca Watts
2021	The Key	Amy Beverley	Victoria Fletcher	Ayra Ahmad	Naz Kaynakcioglu, Skye Linforth, Em Power	Kwame Dawes and Elise Paschen
2022	Dream	Leo Kang Beevers	Erin Hateley	Livvy Owen	Reona Halili, Seohyun (Amy) Shin, Tallula Haynes	John Clegg and Jane Griffiths
2023	The Planets	Esther Keeley	Liv Goldreich	Elise Withey	Erin Bishop, Ellen Bray Koss, Eloise Davis, Louise Guy, Grace Lea, Lauren Lisk, Iona Mandal, Malak O'Neill, Phoebe Palmer, Elizabeth Grace Strassheim	Julia Copus and Gail McConnell
2024	Mirror	Nabiha Ali	Heather Chapman	Sasha Mostafa	Erin Bishop, Magdalena Bone, Tabitha Giddings, Daphne Harries, Ivy Leatherbarrow, William G. Marshall, Luke Roberts, Izzie Smith, Oscar Tavernier, Leah Vickery	Will Harris and Jane Yeh
2025	Roots	Mathilda McKenzie	Aurora Haselfoot Flint	Rebeca Carvatchi	Freya Beer, Charlie Bush, Megan Cheshire, Toby Douglass, Tabitha Giddings, Charlie Jolley, Sasha Mostafa, Ashbah Rehman, Dawn Sands, Cassia Stuttard	Camille Ralphs and Lemn Sissay
2026	A Riddle	Zeba Padinjare	Isobel Glover	Joshua Lynch	Anaiya Bhanji, Grace Bowen, Élise Buckingham-Lazell, Iris Campbell, Clara Capgras, Asha C-L, Freya Faulkner, Sophie MacGray, Malek Owera, Erin Singleton	Fiona Benson and Matthew Hollis
2027	The Deep					Liz Berry and Vona Groarke
