= Clerkenwell Films =

Film and television production company

Clerkenwell Films Limited
- Formerly: Assistmode Limited (1997–1998)
- Type: Privately held company
- Industry: Television/film production
- Founded: 1998
- Area served: United Kingdom
- Key people: Murray Ferguson (CEO)
- Parent: BBC Studios (2021–present)
- Website: clerkenwellfilms.com

Clerkenwell Films Limited is a British film and television production company based in London. Formed in 1998 by producer Murray Ferguson and actor John Hannah, the company has created television shows for both UK and international broadcasters and streaming platforms, including the BBC, ITV, Channel 4, E4, Sky, Hulu and Netflix. On 19 January 2021, BBC Studios took full control, wholly acquiring the company.

Among its credits are:

- Alice and Steve for Disney+ & Hulu
- The Death of Bunny Munro for Sky Atlantic
- Baby Reindeer for Netflix
- Truelove for Channel 4
- The End Of The F***ing World for Channel 4 & Netflix
- Somewhere Boy for Channel 4 & Hulu
- Cheaters for the BBC
- Misfits for E4, Channel 4 & Hulu
- The Aliens for E4 & Channel 4
- Lovesick for Netflix
- The Nightmare Worlds of H. G. Wells for Sky
- Not Safe For Work for Channel 4
- Initial adaptations of the Rebus novels for ITV
- Afterlife for ITV
- Persuasion for ITV
- The Diary of a Nobody adapted by House of Cards creator Andrew Davies for the BBC
