= Alice and Steve =

British television series

- Genre: Comedy
- Created by: Sophie Goodhart
- Written by: Sophie Goodhart
- Directed by: Tom Kingsley
- Starring: Nicola Walker; Joel Fry; Yali Topol Margalith; Jemaine Clement
- Country of origin: United Kingdom
- Original language: English
- No. of series: 1
- No. of episodes: 6

Production
- Executive producers: Sophie Goodhart; Petra Fried; Andy Baker; Wim De Greef; Lee Mason
- Producer: Frances du Pille
- Running time: 30 minutes
- Production company: Clerkenwell Films

Original release
- Network: Disney+
- Release: 8 June 2026

Alice and Steve is a British comedy television series from Clerkenwell Films. It was created by Sophie Goodhart (writer on Sex Education) and is directed by Tom Kingsley. It features Nicola Walker, Joel Fry, Yali Topol Margalith and Jemaine Clement in starring roles. It premiered on the Hulu content hub on Disney+ on 8 June 2026.

== Premise ==
A two and-a-half decades long friendship between Alice and Steve becomes strained when Steve starts dating Alice's daughter.

== Cast ==
- Nicola Walker as Alice
- Jemaine Clement as Steve
- Yali Topol Margalith as Izzy, Alice's daughter
- Joel Fry as Daniel, Alice's husband
- Tyrese Eaton-Dyce as Dom, Alice's son
- Marcia Warren as Val, Alice's mother
- Eilidh Fisher as Rome
- Lydia Wilson as Marni
- Ebony Aboagye as Zuli
- Ken Blackburn as Barry

== Episodes ==
No.	Title	Directed by	Written by	Original release date
1	"Episode 1"	Tom Kingsley	Sophie Goodhart	8 June 2026
2	"Episode 2"	Tom Kingsley	Sophie Goodhart	8 June 2026
3	"Episode 3"	Tom Kingsley	Sophie Goodhart	8 June 2026
4	"Episode 4"	Tom Kingsley	Sophie Goodhart	8 June 2026
5	"Episode 5"	Tom Kingsley	Sophie Goodhart	8 June 2026
6	"Episode 6"	Tom Kingsley	Sophie Goodhart	8 June 2026

== Production ==
The series is made by Clerkenwell Films is written and executive produced by Sophie Goodhart. Tom Kingsley is director. Petra Fried, Andy Baker and Ed Macdonald are executive producers for Clerkenwell Films and Frances du Pille is series producer. Lee Mason is executive produce for Disney+.

The cast is led by Nicola Walker and Jemaine Clement and also includes Yali Topol Margalith, Joel Fry, Tyrese Eaton-Dyce, Marcia Warren, Eilidh Fisher and Ebony Aboagye, with filming taking place in London in May 2025. A trailer for the series was shown by Disney at the Content London event in December 2025.

== Release ==
The series premiered on 8 June 2026 in the United Kingdom and internationally on Disney+ and in the United States on Hulu.

== Reception ==
On the review aggregator website Rotten Tomatoes, the series holds an approval rating of 73%, based on 30 reviews, with an average of rated reviews of 6.3/10. The website's critics consensus reads, "Turning an uncomfortable conceit into an emotionally resonant comedy makes Alice and Steve the best chaotic friends to spend some time with." Metacritic, which uses a weighted average, assigned a score of 66 out of 100 based on 15 critics, indicating "generally favorable" reviews.

Alice and Steve won "Best Series", "Special Interpretation Award" and "Student Award – Best Series" at the 2026 Canneseries in April 2026.
