= Michael Iskander =

Egyptian actor and singer

- Born: c. 2001/2002; Egypt
- Occupations: Actor; Musician
- Years active: 2018–present
- Notable work: House of David
- Musical career
- Genre: Contemporary gospel
- Instruments: Vocals

Michael Iskander (born c. 2001/2002) is an Egyptian-American actor and musician. He became widely known for portraying David in the Amazon Prime Video series House of David (2025).

== Early life and education ==
Iskander was born in Egypt but moved to the United States when he was nine. He began learning English after arriving. He was raised in a religious family and baptized in the Orthodox Church. His interest in acting began in high school, when a friend persuaded him to audition for the school choir. The audition led to a change in his class schedule, which included choir, acting, and musicals.

== Career ==
Iskander made his Broadway debut in the original cast of Kimberly Akimbo, playing Aaron Puckett. The musical won the Tony Award for Best Musical in 2023. In 2021 he released the single "I Know".

In 2025, Iskander transitioned to screen acting and gained fame for his role as King David in the Prime Video series House of David, which follows the biblical figure’s rise from shepherd to monarch. He starred alongside Ali Suliman and Ayelet Zurer. critics particularly highlighted Iskander's performance. His collaboration with Gabby Barrett, "Lead Me To The Water," was featured on the album House of David: Season One (Music Inspired by the Prime Video Original Series).

== Personal life ==
Iskander has spoken about how playing David influenced his understanding of the biblical character. In 2025, he announced his conversion to Catholicism in an Instagram post. Outside acting, he also writes songs, sings and plays the piano and guitar.

== Filmography ==
=== Television ===
| Year | Title | Role | Notes |
|---|---|---|---|
| 2025–present | House of David | David | Main role |

== Theatre credits ==
| Year | Title | Role | Venue | Notes |
|---|---|---|---|---|
| 2021 | Kimberly Akimbo | Aaron Puckett | Atlantic Theater Company | Off-Broadway |
| 2022–24 | Kimberly Akimbo | Aaron Puckett | Booth Theatre | Broadway |

== Discography ==
=== Singles ===
| Year | Title |
|---|---|
| 2021 | I Know |
| 2025 | Lead Me To The Water remix ft. (Gabby Barrett) |

=== Film score ===
- House of David (2025)

== Awards and nominations ==
| Year | Award | Category | Result | Ref. |
|---|---|---|---|---|
| 2019 | The Spirit of the MACY Awards | Best Actor | Won | |
| 2019 | Jimmy Awards | Special Recognition Award | Honoured | |
| 2025 | Movieguide Awards | Most Inspiring Performance | Won | |
