= The Game (2025 TV series) =

British television series

- Screenplay by: Tom Grieves
- Directed by: Toby Frow
- Starring: Jason Watkins; Robson Green; Sunetra Sarker
- Country of origin: United Kingdom
- Original language: English
- No. of series: 2
- No. of episodes: 8

Production
- Editor: John Phillipson
- Production company: Clapperboard Studios

Original release
- Network: Channel 5
- Release: 12 May 2025 – present

The Game is a 2025 British thriller television series starring Jason Watkins, Sunetra Sarker and Robson Green for Channel 5. The first series was aired in the United Kingdom from 12 to 15 May 2025.

== Premise ==
Huw Miller, a recently retired detective becomes obsessed with the unsolved case of a serial killer who stalked his victims when a man, Patrick Harbottle, with a familiar catchphrase moves in opposite him.

== Cast ==
- Jason Watkins as Huw Miller
- Robson Green as Patrick Harbottle
- Sunetra Sarker as Alice Miller
- Indy Lewis as Margot Miller
- Amber James as DS Jenny Atkins
- Tanya Franks as Jackie (series 2)
- Sonny Ashbourne Serkis as Sam (series 2)
- Dominic Rowan as DCS Daniel Clarke (series 2)

== Episodes ==
No.	Title	Directed by	Written by
1	"Episode 1"	Toby Frow	Tom Grieves
In 2021, Detective Inspector Huw Miller chases the Ripton Stalker, a prolific serial killer who psychologically tortures victims over months before viciously killing them, into a warehouse. Without support, the Stalker is able to ambush and attack Huw, leaving him dazed with a head injury on the floor. Before fleeing, the Stalker taunts Huw with the catchphrase attached to all letters he sends to the police, "Catch you later, detective". Three years later, Huw takes early retirement, having accumulated a strong pension, but the case still haunts him. The Stalker got away and was never caught, though the murders seem to have stopped. Secretly, Huw copies all case files relating to the case with the intention of identifying the Stalker in retirement. Jenny, a detective and friend of Huw's, takes him for drinks in the pub and gives him a pair of cuff links. Huw quickly finds himself lost in retirement with little else to do apart from cycling and golfing with his neighbour Frank. After a game at the local course, Huw discovers Frank dead in his bath, which the police believe is a suicide. Shortly afterwards, repairman Patrick Harbottle moves in. Patrick quickly befriends the men of the street and joins them at the pub. At the end of the night, Patrick says "catch you later" to Huw, prompting him to have a panic attack and suspect Patrick to be the Stalker. He requests that Jenny re-investigate Frank's death, which is revealed to be inconclusive, and spends increasing amounts of time attempting to trip Patrick into a confession. At a house party at Patrick's, Huw sneaks upstairs and finds a briefcase, but is taken home by Alice before he can open it. The pair argue, during which Huw reveals his suspicions and the audience learns Huw previously had a breakdown over an obsession with the Stalker.
2	"Episode 2"	Toby Frow	Tom Grieves
Whilst home alone one night, Huw's neighbour Liz begins to experience concerning incidents in which she believes someone is in the house with her. Her husband is away on business, which she suspects of being a cover for an affair, though Huw denies this is the case to Alice when she brings it up. Later that day, Huw covers for his other neighbour, Tina, babysitting her children whilst she goes to a beauty appointment. Patrick appears in the house and tells Huw he's there to fix an issue with the plumbing. Huw pretends to pass Patrick's repair shop by chance one day in an attempt to increase the pressure on him. Patrick doesn't react and instead gives him a tour of the shop, before showing him a doll house he has restored for a client. After identifying a statue of a ballerina, Huw realises that the room is a replica of Ruth Parker's bedroom, the only victim of the Stalker to survive. Huw visits Ruth in the hope of obtaining evidence, but she instead has a nervous episode and locks herself upstairs. Later, Huw breaks into Patrick's house in an attempt to access the suitcase, but flees after realising Patrick knows he is inside and has gone to his house. As a result, Huw is forced to use Ruth to identify Patrick. He takes her to his shop under false pretences, but Ruth does not confirm Patrick as the Stalker and has a breakdown in a restaurant when she learns of Huw's suspicions. Margot, Huw's and Alice's estranged daughter, comes to visit, but soon leaves the house when she realises her father's obsession with the Stalker has restarted. Liz experiences another incident in the house in which somebody activates the upstairs radio, before hearing footsteps downstairs. Her husband returns home, prompting whoever is in the house to leave. Margot returns to the Millers' house for dinner, during which Jenny arrives and berates Huw for approaching Ruth. Huw visits Ruth in an attempt to apologise, but she doesn't answer. That night, the Stalker breaks into her house and kills her whilst Alice kicks Huw out of the house. After going on a drinking binge, Huw notices the front door to Patrick's house is open and goes inside. Patrick invites him in for a drink and spikes him, admitting that he is the Stalker as Huw passes out.
3	"Episode 3"	Toby Frow	Tom Grieves
Huw wakes on Patrick's sofa, having spent the night in his living room. Whilst attempting to sneak upstairs, he spots Patrick looking at Polaroid photographs that he suspects are of his victims. Huw confronts Patrick about his confession, but he denies it. Huw attempts to return home, but his daughter prevents him from doing so, revealing she resents her father's attention for Ruth but not for her. During a conversation with Patrick, Liz's husband Steve reveals someone has gotten into their house on multiple occasions, and Patrick tells him that Huw managed to get into his house the night prior. Jenny and her colleague Martin go to visit Ruth for a prearranged interview, but discover her bound and repeatedly stabbed, the MO of the Stalker. Desperate, Huw visits Declan, the man he accused of being the Stalker several years prior due to his fixation with Ruth. Though initially hostile, Declan reneges and lets Huw into his flat, where he tells him about a ballerina statue he bought for her. At home, Alice returns to find Patrick drinking tea with Margot. She warns him to stay away from her as she is too young. Meanwhile, Martin begins to express belief that Huw may be the Stalker, mainly due to a phone call in which Huw apologises for his behaviour the previous night being recorded on Ruth's answering machine. During the night, Liz and Steve have another break in. When Steve goes to confront the intruder, he finds the door open and one of Huw's golf clubs. Patrick installs security cameras for the couple, and word spreads that Huw may be the culprit. Only Tina's husband Paul refuses to believe this, and instead resolves to help Huw. Paul meets Huw at a pub, but Huw warns him to stay out of the case before listening to a recording of his conversation with Declan. Whilst listening to the recording, he hears Declan say that he took the ballerina statue to a repairman. Borrowing Paul's laptop, Huw finds a receipt in crime scene photos for Patrick's repair shop, linking Patrick to one of the victims. Whilst visiting the store, he identifies Declan on a corkboard featuring polaroids of customers. With Patrick still at the shop, Huw leaves and calls Paul, telling him to break into Patrick's and steal the suitcase. Paul reveals he already did so. Huw rushes back to Paul's house but is unable to find him. He opens the suitcase on his own, discovering it contains hundreds of photos of Ruth, before finding Paul with his throat cut on the floor of the kitchen. The police arrive and arrest Huw for Paul's murder and his suspected murder of Ruth. As Huw is led out of the house and into a police car, Patrick stands at the back of the crowd and winks at him.
4	"Episode 4"	Toby Frow	Tom Grieves
At the police station, Martin and Jenny interrogate Huw about his involvement with the murders of Paul and Ruth. Though Huw attempts to exonerate himself, he realises Patrick has set him up by stealing a knife from his kitchen to kill Paul, emblazoning his suitcase with Huw's initials, ensuring the only fingerprints on the case are Huw's, and planting one of his retirement cufflinks at the scene. Worried his family will be next, Huw attempts to flee the interrogation room but is physically restrained. At the same time, Patrick sits in his workshop and looks at a photo of Ruth's corpse before burning it with a lighter. Patrick and Alice have a stand off outside of the Millers' house, whilst Margot sneaks off to Patrick's workshop to find evidence to exonerate her father. As Jenny transports Huw back to the interrogation room, he sows doubt in her mind about his guilt by recollecting how he told Jenny he hates cufflinks and never wears them. Margot breaks into Patrick's warehouse and finds his camera, but is discovered by Patrick. He takes a photo of her, then asks if the taxi that dropped off her has a receipt of her journey and if Alice knows where she is. As he plans to kill Margot, Jenny arrives and Margot screams for help, prompting Patrick to flee. In the back alley, Patrick jumps Jenny, holding a knife to her throat and forcing her to the floor before telling her if she gets up before he is gone he will kill her and Margot. Now exonerated, Huw returns home to a deeply apologetic street. Patrick has gone on the run and his whereabouts are unknown. After returning from Ruth's funeral, Huw finds the photo of Margot in his house, revealing Patrick has been there. Huw sends the family away with the intention of confronting Patrick alone. That night, Patrick calls Huw from inside his house. Huw hangs up and calls Jenny, who doesn't answer, before baiting Patrick to follow him into the basement, having removed the doorknob to prevent either man getting out before the police arrive. Patrick brandishes a knife and his facade drops, revealing his callous, psychopathic nature. Huw is able to stall by verbally abusing Patrick for his lack of ability to love and stories about Margot's childhood. The police arrive and storm the basement as Patrick stabs Huw. Alice arrives at the same time, and holds Huw as they wait for an ambulance, his fate unknown. The neighbours watch as Patrick is walked to a police car, smeared in blood and uncaring. He sits in the back of the car and grows a slight smirk as the car leaves.

== Production ==
The series is written by Tom Grieves and directed by Toby Frow and had the working title Catch You Later. Clapperboard Studios are producing for Channel 5, while Sphere Abacus is distributing. In April 2025, the series title was confirmed as being The Game.

The cast is led by Jason Watkins and Sunetra Sarker as a married couple, as well as Robson Green.

Watkins and Green had appeared in well-known TV crime dramas McDonald & Dodds as DS Dodds and Grantchester as DI Geordie Keating respectively.

Filming was scheduled for November 2024 and took place in the Basque Country, Spain.

== Broadcast ==
The first series was aired in the United Kingdom on Channel 5 from 12 to 15 May 2025. A second series began airing on 1 September 2026.
