= Hashem =

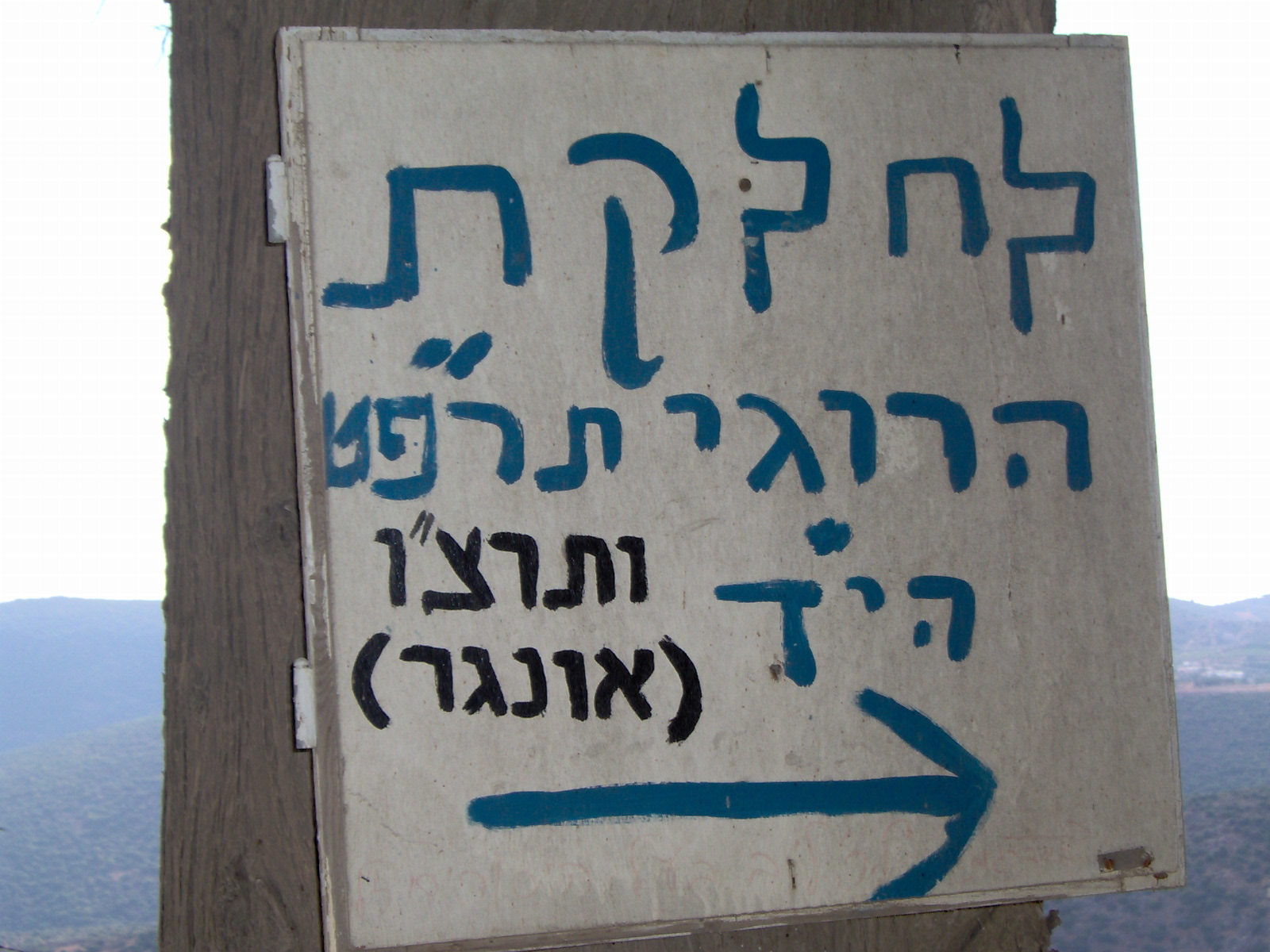
Sign near the site of the Safed massacre, reading הי״ד (H.Y.D., abbreviation of הַשֵּׁם יִקּוֹם דָּמָם Hashem yikkom damam, "may HaShem avenge their blood").

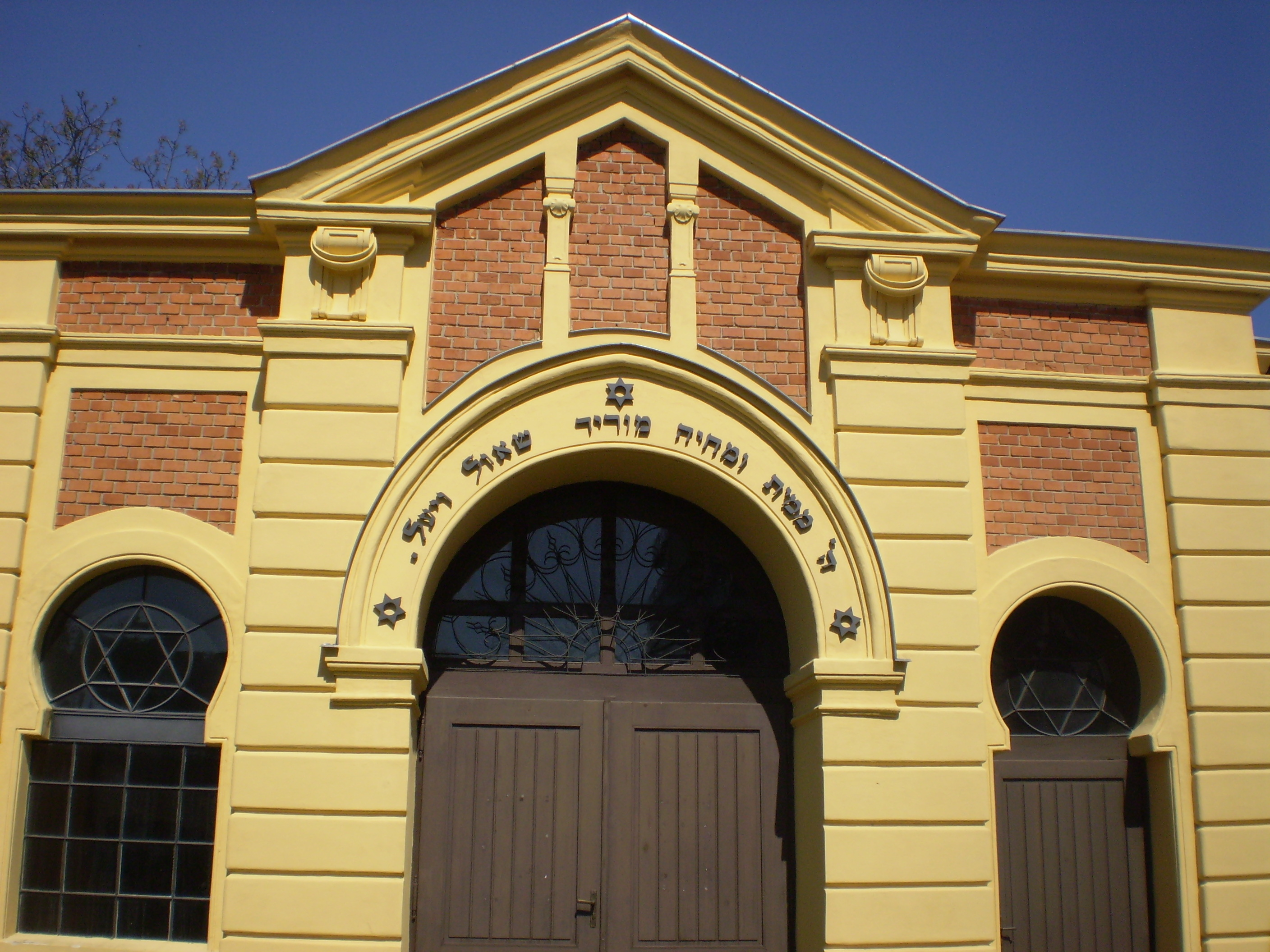
Biblical text on a synagogue in Holešov, Czech Republic: "HaShem (ה׳) kills and makes alive; He brings down to Sheol and raises up." (1 Samuel 2:6)

HaShem (Hebrew: הַשֵּׁם, romanized: haššēm, lit. 'the name', often abbreviated to ה׳ [h′]) is a title used in Judaism to refer to God.

In Judaism, HaShem (lit. 'the Name') is employed to refer to God when not in prayer, in which the term Adonai ("my master") is used. This is to avoid pronouncing God's name casually, a practice rooted in one of the Ten Commandments.

Maimonides writes:

It is not only a false oath that is forbidden. Instead, it is forbidden to mention even one of the names designated for God in vain, although one does not take an oath. For the verse commands us, saying: "To fear the glorious and awesome name". Included in fearing it is not to mention it in vain. Therefore, if because of a slip of the tongue, one mentions [God's] name in vain, he should immediately hurry to praise, glorify and venerate it, so that it will not have been mentioned in vain. What is implied? If he mentions God’s name, he should say: "Blessed be He for all eternity," "He is great and exceedingly praiseworthy," or the like, so that it will not have been [mentioned entirely] in vain.

This led to God's name being replaced with the title, Hashem.

A popular expression containing this phrase is Baruch HaShem, meaning "Thank God" (lit. 'Blessed be the Name').

== See also ==
- Names of God in Judaism
