= Union Seminary Quarterly Review =

- Discipline: Theology
- Language: English
- Edited by: Jason Wyman

Publication details
- History: 1939-2016
- Publisher: Union Theological Seminary
- Frequency: Quarterly

Standard abbreviations
- ISO 4: Union Semin. Q. Rev.

Indexing
- ISSN: 0362-1545
- LCCN: 52017050
- OCLC no.: 781575097

Links
- Journal homepage; Online access; Online archive

The Union Seminary Quarterly Review was a quarterly peer-reviewed academic journal covering theology.

The Union Seminary Quarterly Review published its first issue in 1945. The masthead page of the first issue announced the journal as a replacement for the student-published Union Review (which ran from 1939 to 1945) and the Alumni Bulletin. The journal ran until 2016. The last editor-in-chief was Jason Wyman.
