= Ozem =

Ozem may refer to:

- Otzem, a moshav in southern Israel
- Ozem (biblical figure), a minor biblical figure
