= Digital effect =

A digital effect may refer to:

- A visual effect, created for visual medium such as television or film
- A sound effect, created digitally to alter existing sounds
- A digital effects unit to alter musical instrument sound
