= Yichus Ha'Avot =

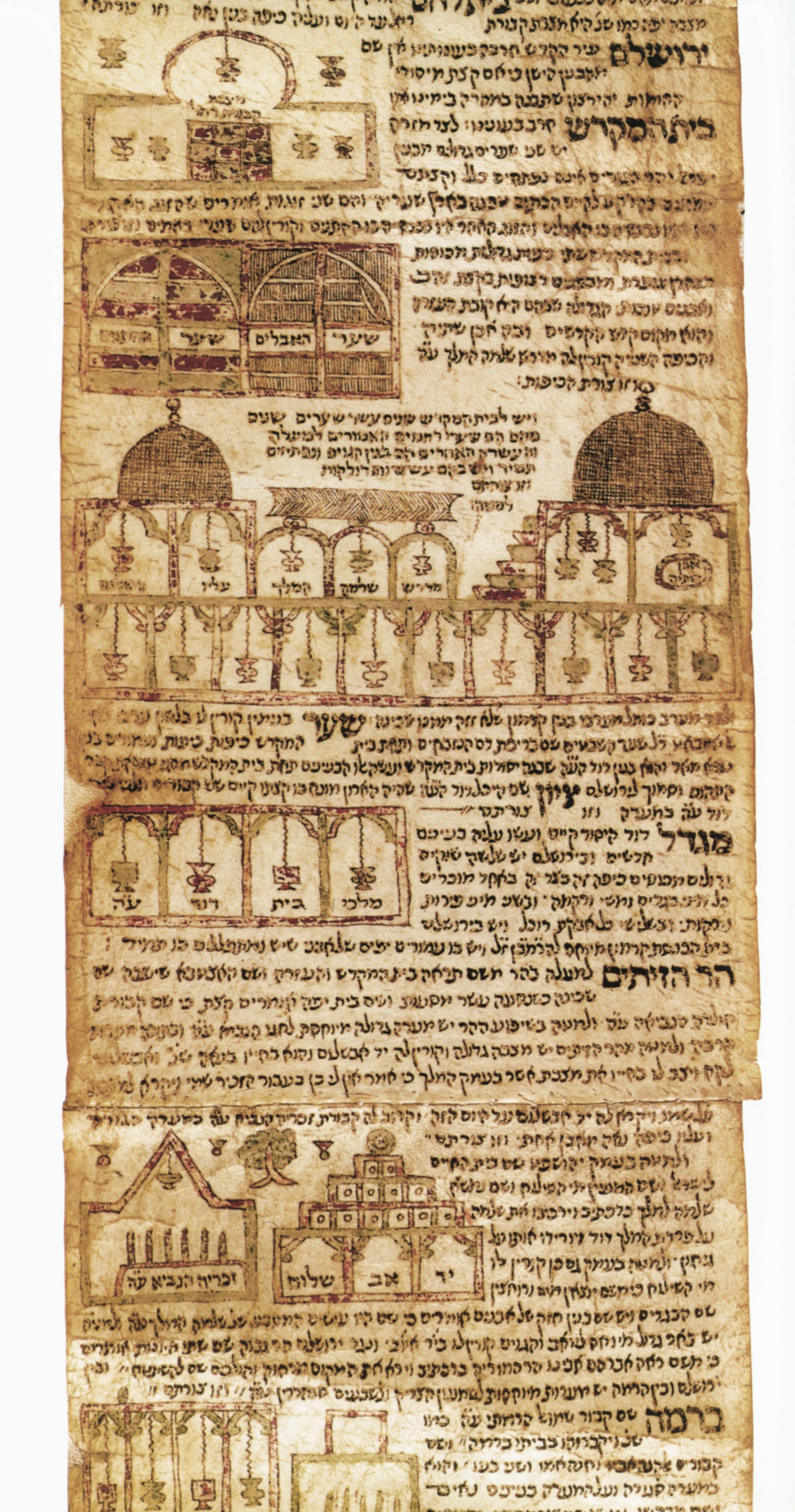
A Yichus Ha'Avot scroll dating to the 16th century

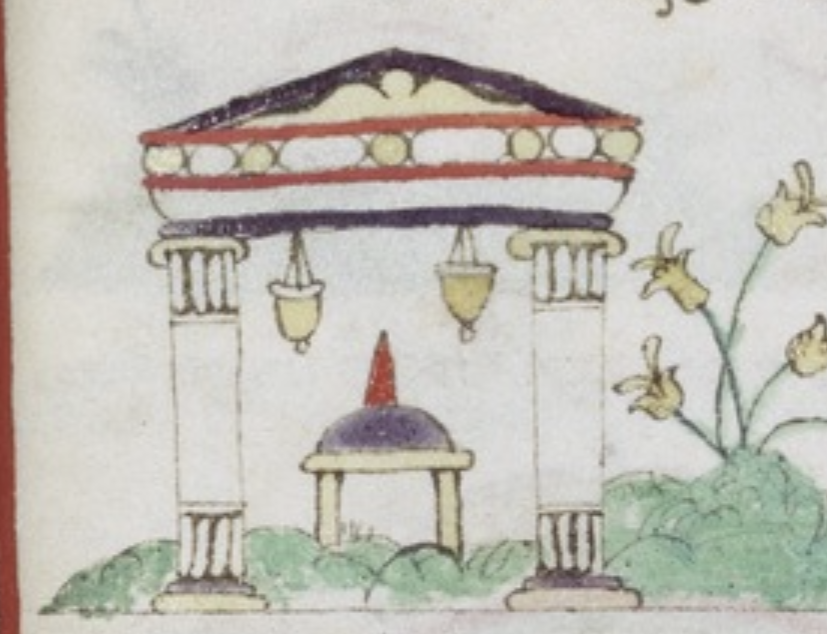
Rachel's Tomb in 1598 copy of Yichus Avot

Yichus Ha'Avot or Yichus Avot (Hebrew: מגלת יחוס אבות), alternately Genealogy of the Patriarchs, is a Jewish pilgrimage scroll detailing the supposed burial sites of the patriarchs. Originally composed in 1537, most likely in Jerusalem, the scroll was reproduced and circulated throughout the Jewish diaspora in the 16th and 17th centuries. From the Middle Ages through the 17th century, it was common for Jews living in the Holy Land to send emissaries called meshulachim abroad with scrolls detailing the locations of holy sites, thus promoting pilgrimage and providing financial support for Jews in Israel.

The scroll includes the Cave of the Patriarchs as well as the tombs of prophets, sages and Amorites. There was some variation between manuscripts but they generally included destinations in Hebron, Tiberias, Sefad, and Bethlehem, in addition to Jerusalem. Some copies also listed destinations in the surrounding area, such as the Tomb of Esther and Mordechai and other significant sites in Damascus, Netzivin, Shushan, and Egypt.

Of the many reproductions made, it is believed that fewer than ten still exist, three of which belong to the National Library of Israel.

== Text and variations ==
The common name of the manuscript comes from the first line, "Lineage of the Forefathers and the Prophets and the Righteous and the Tana’aim [sages]and the Amora’im [Amorites], May They Rest in Peace, in the Land of Israel and Outside the Land, May God Establish Their Merit for Us, Amen."

The scroll includes a portion of Psalm 137 ("If I forget thee, Jerusalem...") though rather than describing the city, it describes the Cave of the Patriarchs and Rachel's Tomb.

A copy written in Sefad in 1564 notes that while the locations described were generally correct, they were imprecise, and so the author corrected them where possible.

Another notable copy, written in 1598 in Casale Monferrato, Italy, includes Gaza, which it describes as "the city of Samson." Gaza is not one of the four traditional holy cities in Judaism (Jerusalem, Hebron, Tiberias, and Safed), nor is it a burial place of a notable Jewish figure. Scholars suggest that it may have been added to later manuscripts as a point of interest due to the fact that many pilgrims had to pass through Gaza during travel anyway. Since Samson is believed to have died in Gaza, its inclusion gave Jewish travelers a connection to the city on their way to more significant pilgrimage sites.
