= Juan Antonio de Frías y Escalante =

Spanish Baroque Golden Age painter (1633-1669)

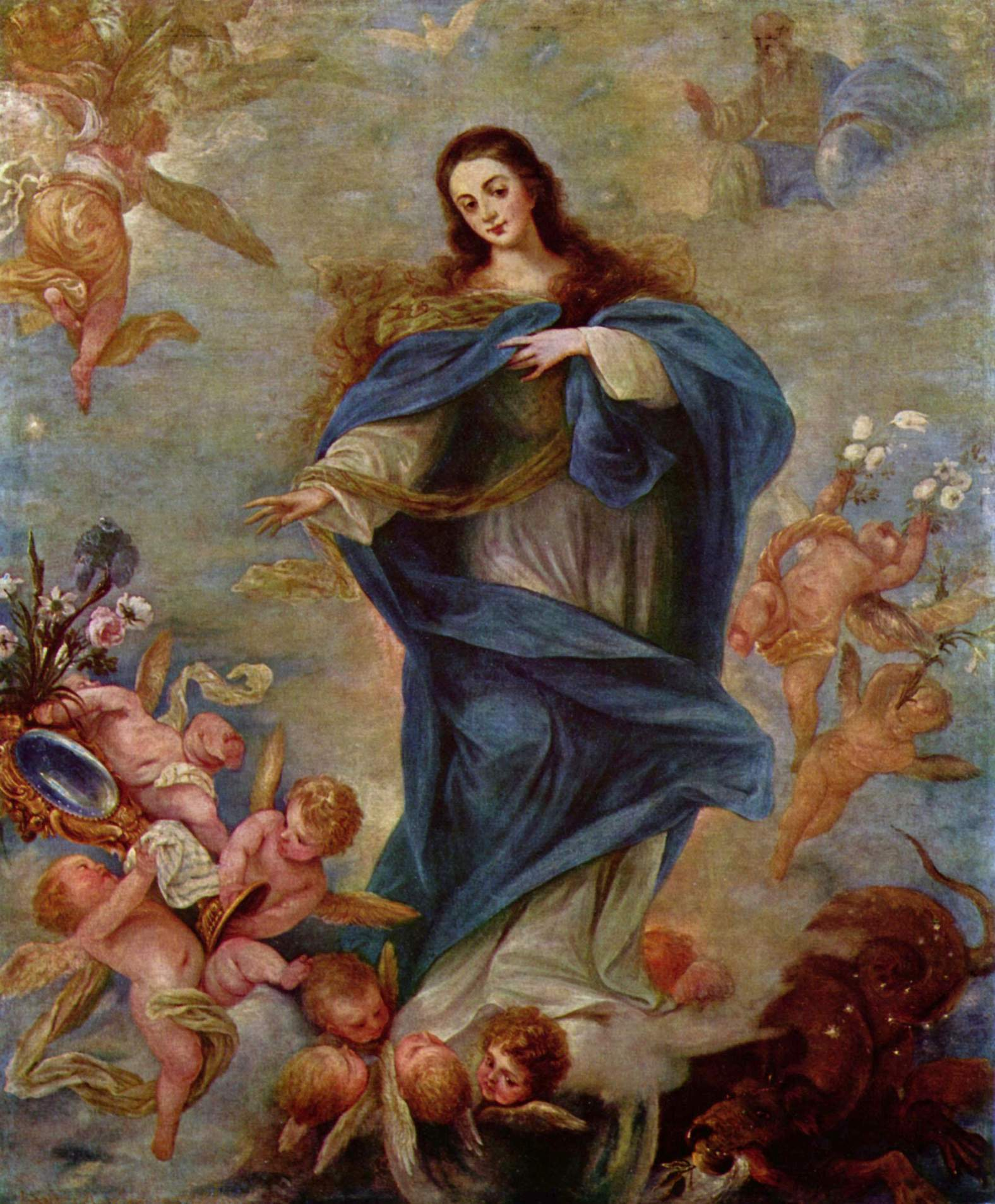
The Immaculate Conception

Juan Antonio de Frías y Escalante (1633 in Cordoba–1669 in Madrid) was a Spanish Baroque Golden Age painter.

He was born in Córdoba, studied under Francisco Ricci in Madrid, and developed a career in the Spanish Court despite his early death. He was an admirer of Venetian paintings by Tintoretto and Veronese. His last paintings are in the rococo style. He is known for his religious paintings, e.g. Roman Catholic Marian art depicting the Immaculate Conception.
