= Richard M. Davidson (theologian) =

American theologian

Personal details
- Occupation: Theologian

Richard M. Davidson is an Old Testament scholar at Andrews University, Michigan, where he is currently the J. N. Andrews Professor of Old Testament Exegesis.

== Biography ==
Davidson was the president of the Adventist Theological Society from 1996 to 1998. He is married to JoAnn Davidson.

== Flame of Yahweh ==
Davidson is best known for his major academic work Flame of Yahweh: A Theology of Sexuality in the Old Testament, published in 2007. The title is derived from the Biblical verse Song of Solomon 8:6c. He has been studying the topic of sexuality in the Old Testament since the early 1980s. Grenville Kent writes "Davidson is to be commended for an OT biblical theology of sexuality which is fearless, deep and comprehensive – almost encyclopaedic." Other reviewers of this work include Anselm C. Hagedorn, C. Amos, J. Harold Ellens, Yael Klangswisan, Dale Launderville, Harvey E. Solganick, Nicholas T. Batzig, Jennifer L. Koosed, Heather Macumber, and James D. Lorenz.

According to one reviewer, "From the structural point of view, the book forms a literary envelope. Davidson begins with the theology of sexuality depicted in the narrative of the Garden of Eden and closes the book with the restoration of that theology in the book of Song of Solomon. There we again find a couple deeply in love in the setting of a garden."

== See also ==
- Seventh-day Adventist Church
- Seventh-day Adventist theology
- Seventh-day Adventist eschatology
- History of the Seventh-day Adventist Church
- 28 Fundamental Beliefs
- Questions on Doctrine
- Teachings of Ellen G. White
- Inspiration of Ellen G. White
- Prophecy in the Seventh-day Adventist Church
- Investigative judgment
- The Pillars of Adventism
- Second Coming
- Conditional Immortality
- Historicism
- Three Angels' Messages
- End times
- Sabbath in seventh-day churches
- Ellen G. White
- Adventist Review
- Adventism
- Seventh-day Adventist Church Pioneers
- Seventh-day Adventist worship
