= Jon D. Levenson =

American Hebrew Bible scholar

Jon Douglas Levenson is an American Hebrew Bible scholar who is the Albert A. List Professor of Jewish Studies at the Harvard Divinity School.

== Education ==
- A.B. summa cum laude in English, Harvard College, 1971.
- A.M. Department of Near Eastern Languages and Civilizations, Harvard University, 1974.
- Ph.D. Department of Near Eastern Languages and Civilizations, Harvard University, 1975.

== Areas of specialization ==
Levenson is a scholar of the Hebrew Bible and rabbinic midrashim, with an interest in the philosophical and theological issues involved in Hebrew Biblical studies. He specializes in the relationship between traditional modes of biblical interpretation and modern historical criticism, as well as the relationship between Judaism and Christianity.

Levenson's research foci include the theological traditions of ancient Israel and biblical and rabbinic periods; literary interpretation of the Hebrew Bible; midrash; history of Jewish biblical interpretation; modern Jewish theology; and Jewish–Christian relations. His 1987 essay Why Jews Are Not Interested in Biblical Theology (Note: Originally published as Levenson, Jon (1987). "Why Jews Are Not Interested in Biblical Theology". In Neusner, Jacob; Levine, Baruch A.; Frerichs, Ernest S.; McCracken-Flesher, Caroline (eds.). Judaic perspectives on ancient Israel. Philadelphia: Fortress Press. pp. 281–307. ISBN 978-0800608323.; later revised and republished in Levenson, Jon D. (1993). The Hebrew Bible, the Old Testament, and Historical Criticism: Jews and Christians in biblical studies (1st ed.). Louisville, Ky.: Westminster/John Knox Press. pp. 33–61. ISBN 978-0664254070.) challenged the traditional methods of the fields of historical criticism and biblical theology and remains widely referenced.

Levenson has been called "the most interesting and incisive biblical exegete among contemporary Jewish thinkers." Furthermore, his work has been described as "challenging the idea, part of Greek philosophy and popular now, that resurrection for Jews and the followers of Jesus is simply the survival of an individual's soul in the hereafter." In Resurrection and the Restoration of Israel, Levenson argues that in classical Christianity and Judaism, "resurrection occurs for the whole person—body and soul. For early Christians and some Jews, resurrection meant being given back one's body or possibly God creating a new similar body after death."

Levenson is a member of the editorial board of the Jewish Review of Books. In the late 1990s, his body of work, up to then, was reviewed by Marvin A. Sweeney and put in the larger context of the field of biblical theology. In his Jewish Book Annual review, Sweeney wrote: "A great deal of his work focuses on the seminal question of identifying the role that Christian theological constructs have played in the reading of biblical literature, even when the reading is presented as historically based objective scholarship, and of developing reading strategies that can remove these constructs in order to let the biblical texts 'speak for themselves.' Work of this kind naturally paves the way for the development of Jewish biblical theology."

== Recognition ==
- Henry R. Luce III Senior Fellowship in Theology, 1999–2000
- National Jewish Book Award (for Resurrection and the Restoration of Israel), 2006, awarded in March 2007
- Doctorate in Divinity, honoris causa, from St. Mary's Seminary and University, Baltimore, Maryland, awarded May 10, 2007
- Biblical Archaeology Society Publication Award in the category of Best Book Relating to the Hebrew Bible published in 2005 or 2006 (for Resurrection and the Restoration of Israel), awarded August 2007
- Barry Prize for Distinguished Intellectual Achievement, American Academy of Sciences and Letters, 2023

== Books ==
- — (1972). The Book of Job in its time and in the twentieth century. LeBaron Russell Briggs Prize Essay in English. Harvard University Press. ISBN 0-674-07860-8. OCLC 380516.
- Halpern, Baruch; —, eds. (1981). Traditions in transformation: Turning points in Biblical faith [Festschrift honoring Frank Moore Cross]. Winona Lake, Ind: Eisenbrauns. ISBN 978-0-931464-06-5.
- — (1986). Theology of the program of restoration of Ezekiel 40-48. Harvard Semitic monographs. Atlanta, Ga: Scholars Press. ISBN 978-0-89130-105-9.
- — (1987). Sinai & Zion: An entry into the Jewish Bible (1st Harper & Row paperback ed.). New York: HarperSanFrancisco. ISBN 978-0-06-254828-3.
- — (1988). Creation and the persistence of evil: The Jewish drama of divine omnipotence (1st ed.). San Francisco: Harper & Row. ISBN 978-0-06-254845-0.
- — (1993). The death and resurrection of the beloved son: The transformation of child sacrifice in Judaism and Christianity. New Haven u.a: Yale Univ. Press. ISBN 978-0-300-05532-0.
- — (1993). The Hebrew Bible, the Old Testament, and historical criticism: Jews and Christians in biblical studies (1st ed.). Louisville, Ky: Westminster John Knox Press. ISBN 978-0-664-25407-0.
- — (1997). Esther: A commentary (1st ed.). Louisville, Ky: Westminster John Knox Press. ISBN 978-0-664-22093-8.
- — (2006). Resurrection and the restoration of Israel: The ultimate victory of the God of life. Yale University Press. ISBN 978-0-300-11735-6.
- Madigan, Kevin J; — (2008). Resurrection: The power of God for Christians and Jews. New Haven: Yale University Press. ISBN 978-0-300-12277-0.
- — (2012). Inheriting Abraham: The legacy of the patriarch in Judaism, Christianity, and Islam. Princeton: Princeton University Press. ISBN 978-0-691-15569-2.
- — (2015). The Love of God: Divine Gift, Human Gratitude, and Mutual Faithfulness in Judaism. Princeton University Press. ISBN 978-0-691-16429-8.

== Employment ==
- Albert A. List Professor of Jewish Studies, The Divinity School, Harvard University, 1988-
- Affiliate Member, Department of Near Eastern Languages and Civilizations, Harvard University, 1988-
- Professor of Hebrew Bible in the Divinity School and in the Committee on General Studies in the Humanities, the University of Chicago, 1988
- Associate Professor of Hebrew Bible in the Divinity School and in the Committee on General Studies in the Humanities, the University of Chicago, 1986–88
- Associate Professor of Hebrew Bible in the Divinity School, the University of Chicago, 1982–86
- Assistant Professor of Religion and Biblical Studies, Wellesley College, 1975–82
