= Quintus Pomponius Musa =

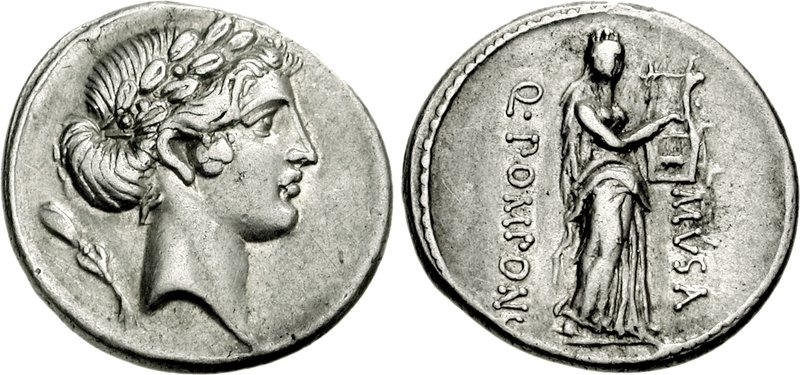
Erato
Laureate head of Apollo right	Erato, the Muse of Erotic Poetry, playing lyre; Q • POMPONI to left, MVSA to right.
AR, 3.99 g

Quintus Pomponius Musa was a magistrate, moneyer and banker during the Republican Period in Rome, around 66 BC. He was a member of the Pomponia gens.

According to the National Museum of Scotland, moneyers commissioned designs, which often referred to famous ancestors, associations to favourite cults, or, as here, puns on their names. Musa created ten coin designs: one design for each of the nine Muses, a play on Musa's name; and one coin featuring the image of Hercules with the inscription HERCULES MUSARUM (Hercules of the Muses). All ten designs depict the specific muse on the reverse, while featuring the image of Apollo on the obverse; Apollo presided over the Muses.

When Hercules is represented, he is called Hercules Musarum, or Musageta, that is, "The leader of the Muses." He was known by this name in Greece, and later in Rome, when his statue and those of the nine Muses were brought from Greece, and the temple erected there for their reception. On other coins of Quintus Pomponius Musa the nine Muses appear arranged in the usual order, each distinguished by her emblem. The most distinct figure is that Urania, from the Greek Ουρανος; she points with a staff to heaven, as the Muse of astronomy.

Rome mint. Laureate head of Apollo right; two crossed tibiae behind / Euterpe, the Muse of Music and Lyric Poetry, wearing long flowing tunic and peplum, standing right, supporting her head with her left hand by resting her elbow on column, and holding two tibiae in right hand; Q • POMPONI downwards to left, MVSA downwards to right.	Rome mint. Diademed head of Apollo right, wearing hair in ringlets; Q • POMPONI downwards to left, MVSA upwards to right / Hercules Musagetes, Conductor of the Muses, standing right, wearing lion skin on shoulders, playing lyre; club to right; HERCVLES downwards to right, MVSARVM downward to left.
Rome mint. Laureate head of Apollo right; scepter to left / Melpomene, the Muse of Tragedy, standing facing, head right, holding club and mask.	
Rome mint. Laureate head of Apollo right; sandal behind / Thalia, the Muse of Comedy, wearing long flowing tunic and peplum, standing left, holding comic mask in right hand, resting left elbow on draped column; Q · POMPONI downward to right, M’VSA downward to left.	Rome mint. Laureate head of Apollo right; plectrum to left / Calliope, the Muse of epic poetry, wearing long flowing tunic and peplum, standing right, holding lyre set on column with right hand; Q • POMPONI to right, MVSA to left.
Rome mint. Laureate head of Apollo right; star of eight rays to left / Urania, the Muse of Astronomy, wearing long flowing tunic and peplum, standing left, touching with wand held in right hand globe set on base; Q • POMPONI downwards to right, MVSA downwards to left.	Rome mint. Laureate head of Apollo right; wreath tied with fillet to left / Polyhymnia, the Muse of Divine Hymns and Sacred Poetry, wearing long flowing tunic and peplum, standing facing, her head bound with wreath; Q • POMPONI downwards to right, MVSA downwards to left.
