= Rhesus =

Rhesus may refer to:

- Rhesus of Thrace, a king in Greek mythology
- In Greek mythology, a river-god, son of Oceanus and Tethys
- Rhesus (play), the Ancient Greek tragedy thought to have been written by Euripides
- Rhesus macaque, also known as the rhesus monkey
- Rhesus factor, associated with a blood type, named after the monkey
- Rh disease, also known as rhesus disease
- 9142 Rhesus, an asteroid
- Rhesus Glacier, Antarctica

== See also ==
- Reeses
- Recess (disambiguation)
