= Olynthus (mythology) =

- Founder of Olynthus

Genealogy
- Parents: Strymon (Eioneus) and Euterpe/Calliope/Terpsichore or Heracles and Bolbe
- Siblings: Rhesus, Brangas, Sete

In Greek mythology, Olynthus or Olynthos (Ancient Greek: Ὄλυνθος) was a son of Heracles and Bolbe, from whom the ancient city of Olynthus, and the river Olynthus near Apollonia, were believed to have received their name according to Athenaeus. According to Conon and Stephanus of Byzantium, Olynthus was son of king Strymon, and brother of Brangas and Rhesus.

== Mythology ==
After Olynthus was killed during the chase by a lion, his brother Brangas buried him on the spot where he had fallen, and called the town which he subsequently built there Olynthus.
