= Arganthone =

In Greek mythology, Arganthone (Ancient Greek: Ἀργανθώνη) was a huntress from Kios and a lover of Rhesus. The myth of her is recorded by Parthenius of Nicaea and runs as follows.

== Mythology ==
In the course of one of his military campaigns, Rhesus heard of the beautiful Arganthone of Kios, who had no taste for indoor life and would instead spend her time hunting completely on her own, accompanied by no one other than her large pack of hounds. Eager to get to know her, Rhesus arrived at Kios and invited Arganthone to go hunting together, claiming that he too hated the company of men; she believed his words and sympathized with him. After they had spent some time together, Arganthone realized she had fallen in love with Rhesus and, despite initially being hesitant to confess her feelings, eventually did so and had her feelings answered, so that Rhesus eventually married her. Later on, the Trojan War broke out and Rhesus was asked to join in. Arganthone tried to dissuade her loved one from going to the war, as if she felt he would not return, but Rhesus hated the thought of being deemed unwarlike and did go. He was killed almost immediately upon his arrival at Troy. When Arganthone heard of his death, she went in grief to the place where they had become lovers for the first time and wandered about there calling out Rhesus' name until she starved herself to death.

Stephanus of Byzantium reports that a mountain in Mysia was named after Arganthone.

== Sources ==
- Parthenius, Love Romances. Transl. by S. Gaselee (1916) at Classical E-text
