= Recess =

Recess may refer to:

- Recess (break), a short intermission in an activity
- Recess (motion), a break in a meeting of a deliberative assembly
- Alcove (architecture), part of a room
- A setback (architecture) especially across all storeys (a recessed bay or series of such bays)
- Recess, County Galway, Ireland; a village

== Music ==
- Recess (album), the 2014 debut album by Skrillex
- Recess (bbno$ album), 2019
- Recess Records, a record label
- "Recess" (song), by Skrillex and Kill the Noise
- "Recess", a song by Melanie Martinez on the album K-12
- "Recess", a song by Muse on the album Hullabaloo Soundtrack

== Other uses ==
- Recess (Holy Roman Empire), the official record of decisions of an Imperial Diet
- Epitympanic recess, part of the middle ear
- Recess (TV series), an animated series by Disney
  - Recess: School's Out, a 2001 film based on the series

== See also ==
- Recessed light
- Recession
- Recessive
- Recces
- Reeses
- Rhesus (disambiguation)
