= Strymon (mythology) =

Greek river-god

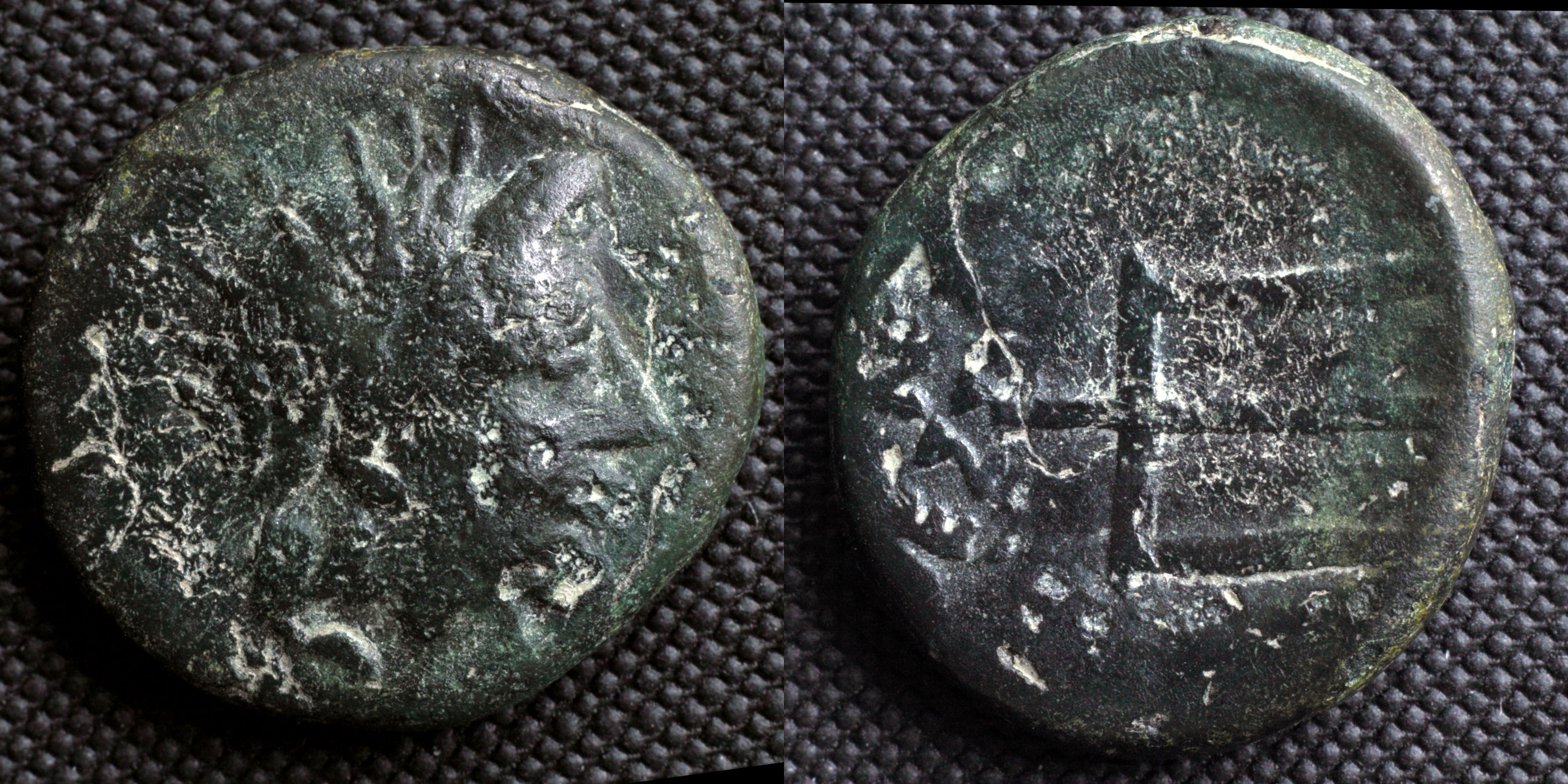
O: head of river-god Strymon R: trident This coin was struck by Serdi tribe in 187-168 BC or later. It is an overstrike on official Macedonian coin and imitates another Macedonian type.

In Greek mythology, Strymon (/stryˈmɔːn/; Ancient Greek: Στρυμών, romanized: Strymṓn, lit. 'stream' or 'river') was a river-god and son of the Titans Oceanus and his sister-wife Tethys. He was a king of Thrace. By the Muses, Euterpe or Calliope or Terpsichore, he became the father of Rhesus. His other sons were Olynthus and Brangas.

Neaera bore Strymon's daughter, Evadne who became the wife of King Argus. He was also the father of Tereine who mothered Thrassa by the god Ares. Another daughter, Rhodope became the mother of Athos by Poseidon.
