= Brangas (mythology) =

Son of Strymon in Greek mythology

In Greek mythology, Brangas (Ancient Greek: Βράγγας) was a Thracian prince as son of King Strymon, and the brother of Rhesus and Olynthus.

== Mythology ==
Rhesus was killed by Diomedes while fighting for the Trojans in the Trojan War. When Olynthus was killed during the chase by a lion, Brangas buried him on the spot where he had fallen, and called the town which he subsequently founded Olynthus. The story of Brangas appears only in Conon, who, unfortunately, lists no sources.
