= Rhesus (king of Thrace) =

Mythical King of Thrace

- King of Thrace
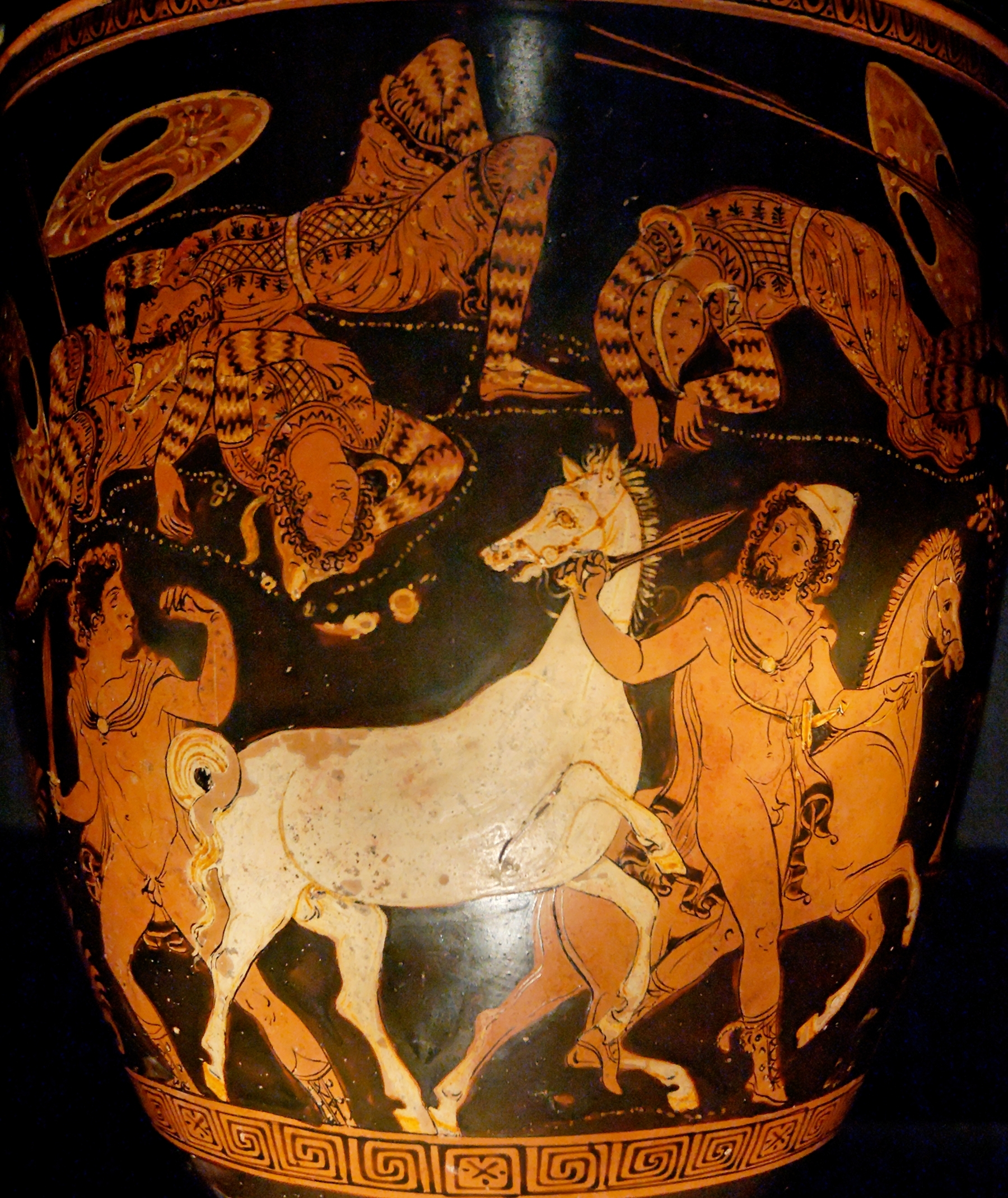
- Odysseus and Diomedes stealing Rhesus' horses, red-figure situla by the Lycurgus Painter, c. 360 BC

Genealogy
- Parents: Strymon (Eioneus) and Euterpe/Calliope/Terpsichore or Heracles and Bolbe
- Siblings: Olynthus, Brangas, Sete

Rhesus (/ˈriːsəs/; Ancient Greek: Ῥῆσος, romanized: Rhêsos) is a mythical king of Thrace in The Iliad who fought on the side of Trojans. Rhesus arrived late to the battle and, while he slept in his camp after arriving, Diomedes and Odysseus killed him and stole his team of horses during a night raid.

== Etymology ==
His name is Thracian and probably derives from the PIE root *reg-, 'to rule', showing a satem-sound change.

An Thracian spelling of the name is given as Rézas which are cognate to the latin Rex.

== Family ==
According to Homer, his father was Eioneus who may be connected to the historic Eion in western Thrace, at the mouth of the Strymon, and the port of the later Amphipolis. Later writers provide Rhesus with a more exotic parentage, claiming that his mother was one of the Muses (Euterpe, Calliope or Terpsichore) and his father, the river god Strymon. Stephanus of Byzantium mentions the name of Rhesus' sister Sete, who had a son Bithys with Ares. In one account, Rhesus' brothers are called Olynthus and Brangas.

== Mythology ==
Rhesus was raised by fountain nymphs and died without engaging in battle. Due to Thrace being attacked by Scythia, Rhesus led his army to Troy later than the other allied armies. Dolon, who had gone out to spy on Agamemnon’s army for Hector, was caught by Diomedes and Odysseus and proceeded to tell the two about the new arrival of the Thracians. Dolon explained that Rhesus had the finest horses, as well as huge, golden armor that was suitable for gods rather than mortals. While the Thracians were sleeping, Diomedes and Odysseus infiltrated the camp in the dead of night, killing a number of Thracians and Rhesus in his tent while also stealing his famous steeds.

The event portrayed in the Iliad also provides the action of the play Rhesus, transmitted among the plays of Euripides. The mother of Rhesus, one of the nine Muses, then arrived and laid blame on all those responsible: Odysseus, Diomedes, and Athena. She also announced the imminent resurrection of Rhesus, who will become immortal but will be sent to stay in a cave. Scholia to the Iliad episode and the Rhesus agree in giving Rhesus a more heroic stature, incompatible with Homer's version.

There was also a river in Bithynia named Rhesus, with Greek myth providing an attendant river god of the same name. Rhesus the Thracian king was himself associated with Bithynia through his love with the Bithynian huntress Arganthone, in the Erotika Pathemata ["Sufferings for Love"] by Parthenius of Nicaea, chapter 36.

== Namesake ==
- Rhesus Glacier on Anvers Island in Antarctica is named after Rhesus of Thrace, as is the Jovian asteroid 9142 Rhesus.
