= Polyhymnia =

Muse of sacred poetry in Greek mythology

- Goddess of Hymns
- Member of the Muses
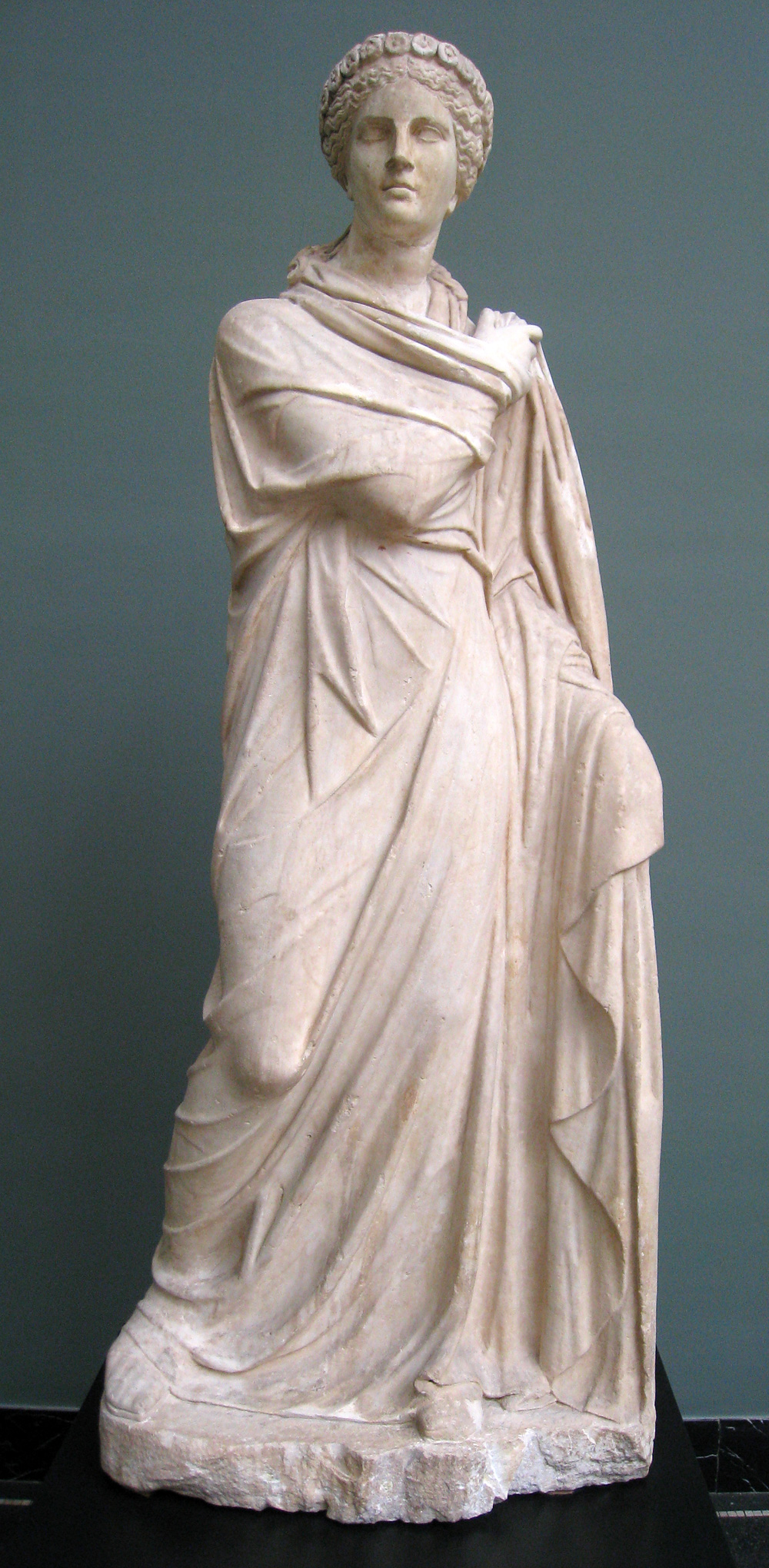
- Roman statue of Polyhymnia, 2nd century AD, depicting her in the act of dancing
- Abode: Mount Olympus

Genealogy
- Parents: Zeus and Mnemosyne
- Siblings: Euterpe, Calliope, Urania, Clio, Erato, Thalia, Terpsichore, Melpomene and several paternal half-siblings
- Children: Orpheus, Triptolemus

Polyhymnia (/pɒliˈhɪmniə/; Greek: Πολυύμνια, lit. 'the one of many hymns'), alternatively Polymnia (Πολύμνια), is, in Greek mythology, the Muse of sacred poetry, sacred hymn, dance and eloquence, as well as agriculture and pantomime.

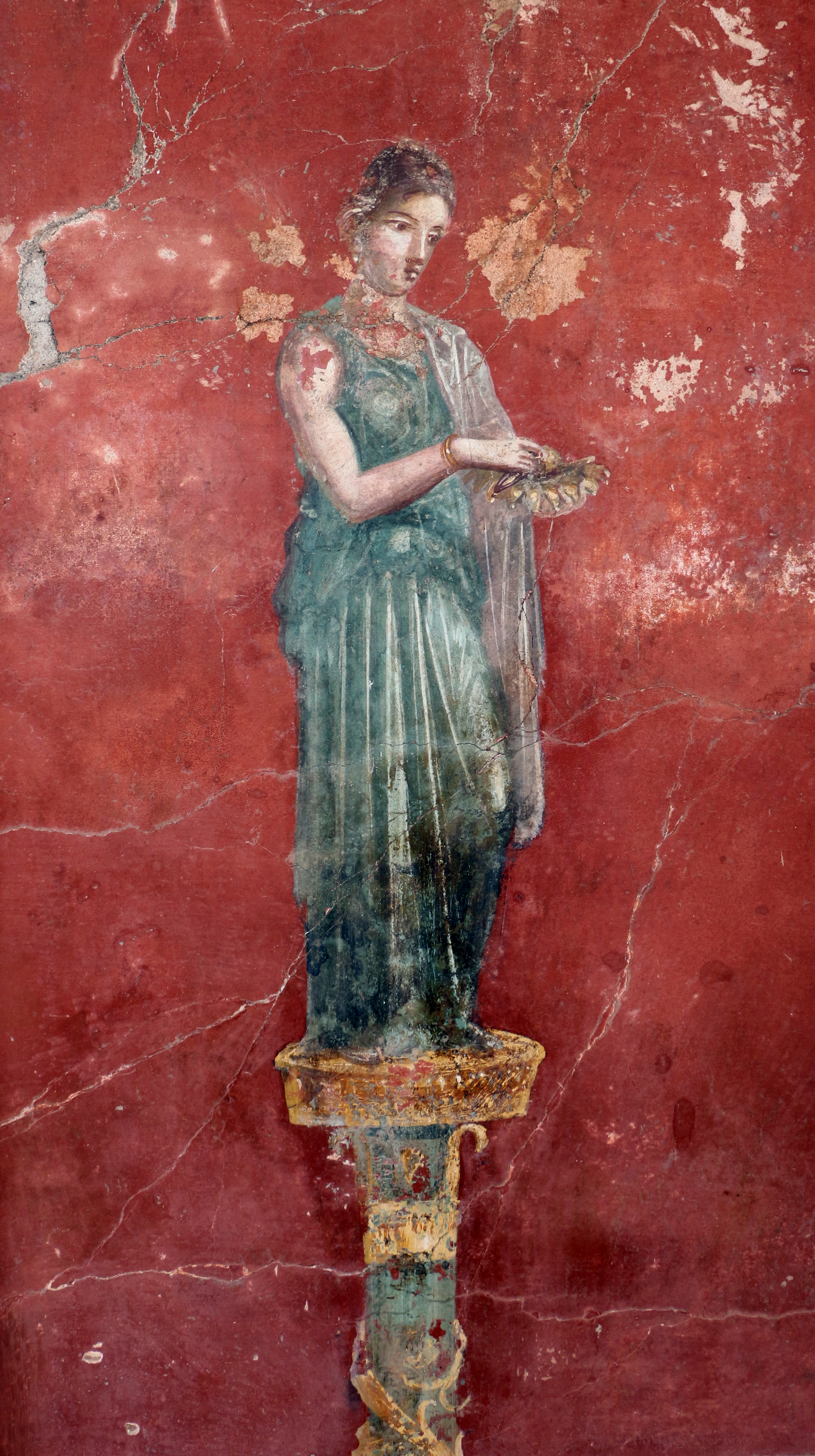
Polyhymnia on an antique fresco from Pompeii

== Etymology ==
Polyhymnia's name comes from the Greek words "poly", meaning "many", and "hymnos", which means "praise".

== Appearance ==
Polyhymnia is depicted as serious, pensive and meditative, and often holding a finger to her mouth, dressed in a long cloak and veil and resting her elbow on a pillar. Polyhymnia is also sometimes credited as being the Muse of geometry and meditation.

In Bibliotheca historica, Diodorus Siculus wrote, "Polyhymnia, because by her great (polle) praises (humnesis) she brings distinction to writers whose works have won for them immortal fame...".

== Family ==
As one of the Muses, Polyhymnia is the daughter of Zeus and the Titaness Mnemosyne. She was also described as the mother of Triptolemus by Cheimarrhoos, son of Ares, and of the musician Orpheus by Oeagrus.

== Dedications ==
On Mount Parnassus, there was a spring sacred to the Muses. It was said to flow between two big rocks above Delphi, then down into a large square basin. The water was used by the Pythia, who were priests and priestesses, for oracular purposes including divination.

== In popular culture ==
- In astronomy, there are ten asteroids named after the Muses, and moons named after another two. The one named after Polyhymnia is a main belt asteroid discovered by Jean Chacornac, a French astronomer, in 1854.

== Gallery ==
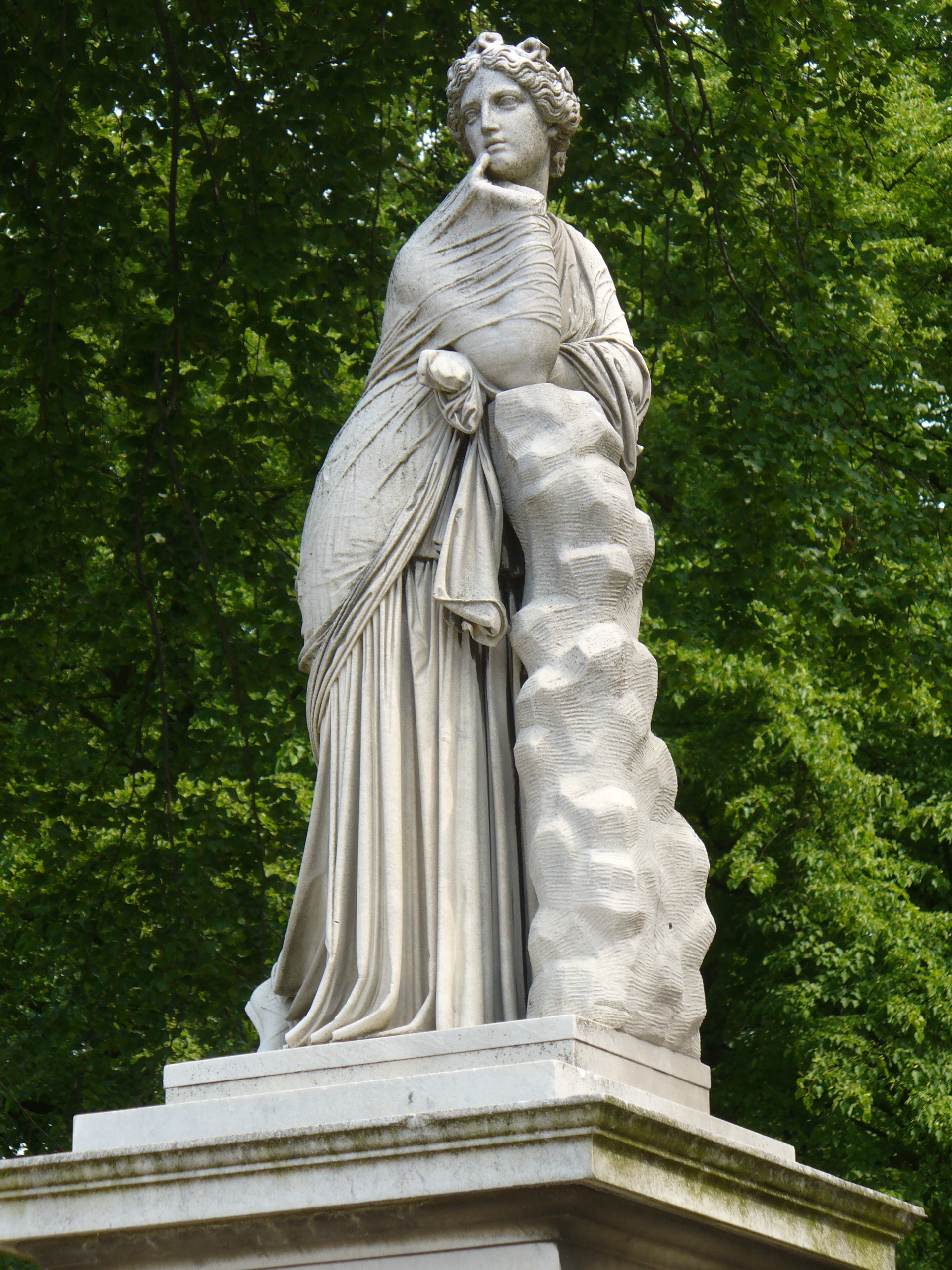
Polyhymnia, Friedrich Ochs, 1857

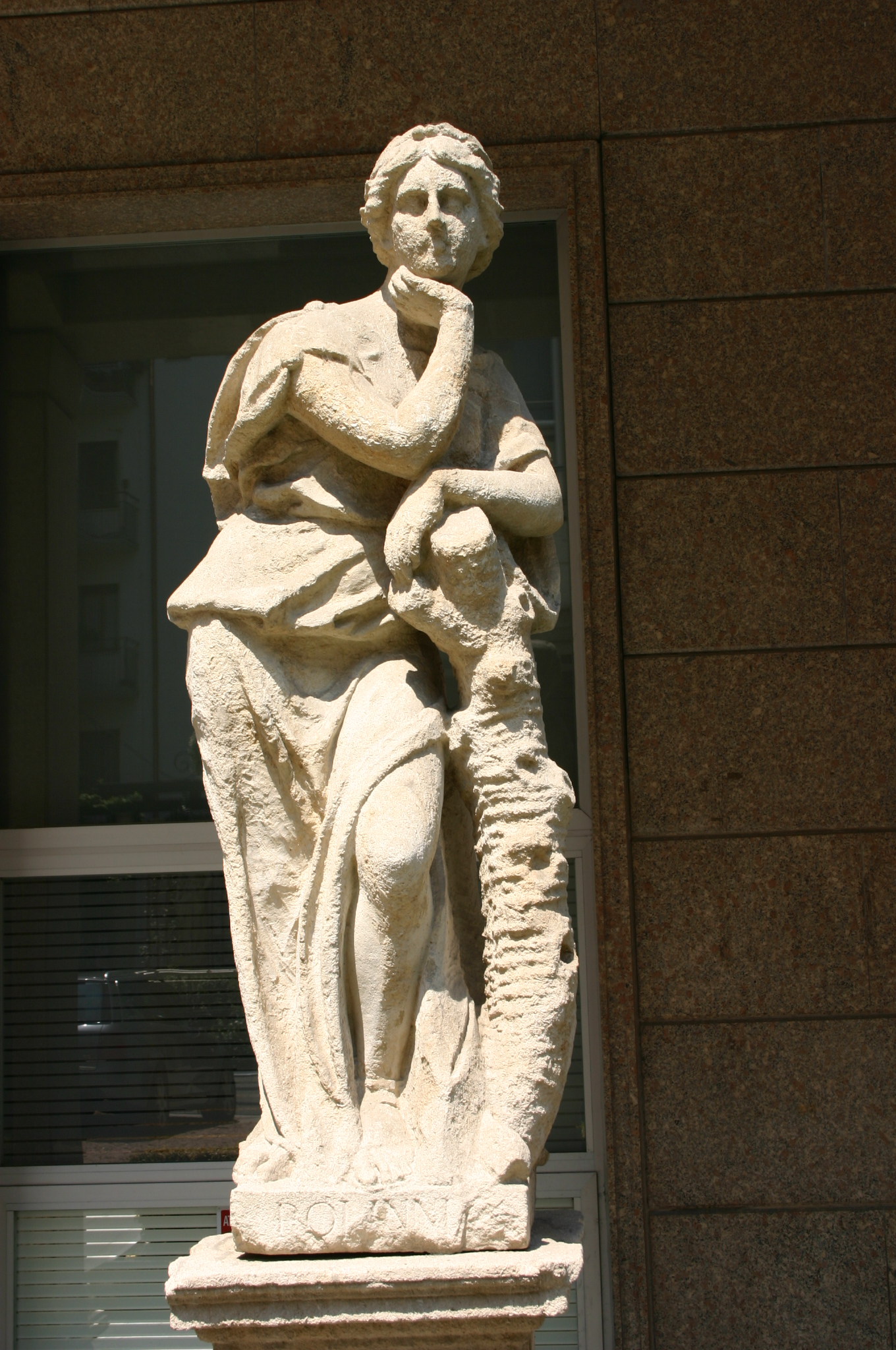
Polyhymnia, Milano

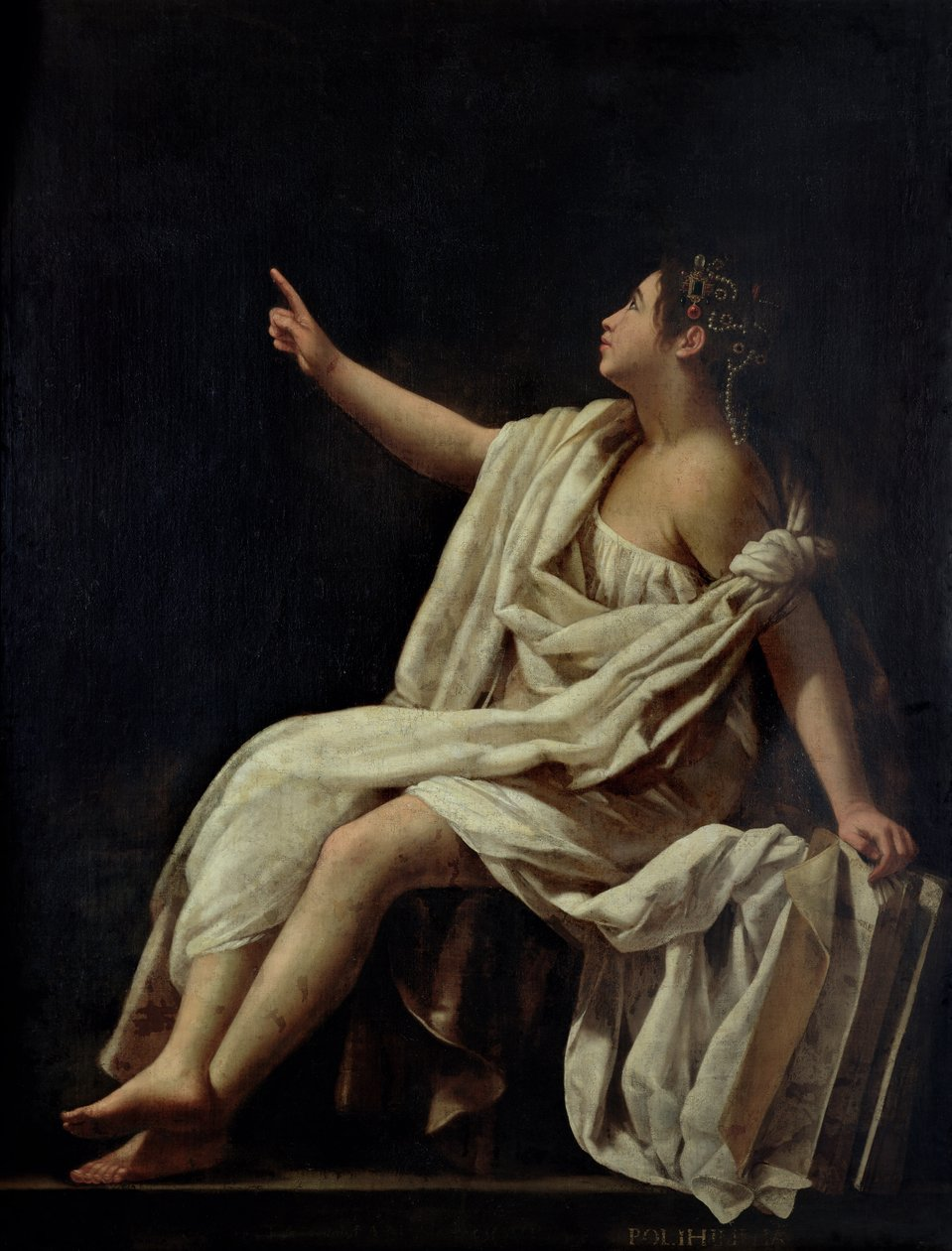
Polyhymnia, Giovanni Baglione, 1620

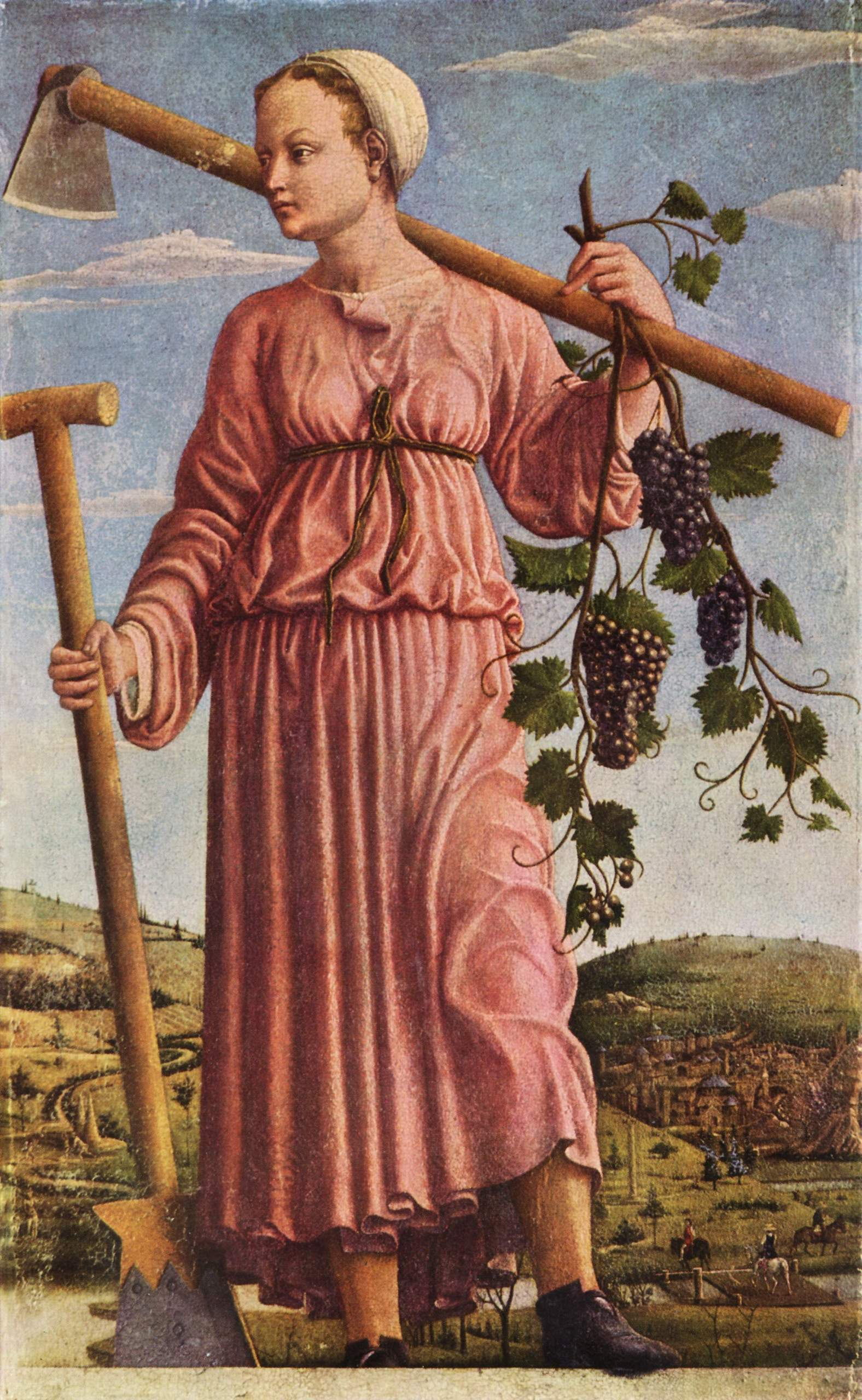
Polyhymnia, Francesco del Cossa, 1455 – 1460

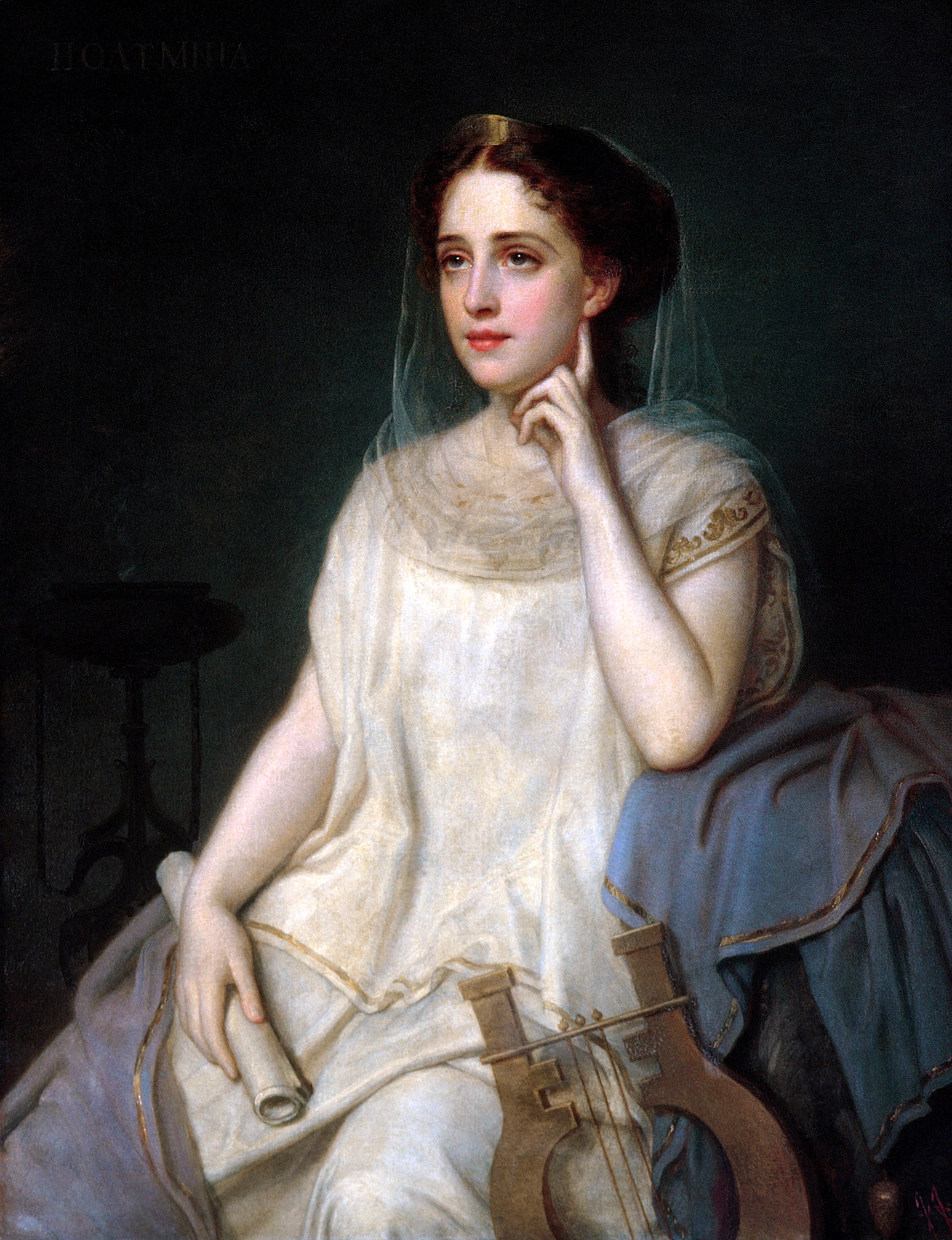
Polyhymnia, Giuseppe Fagnani, 1869

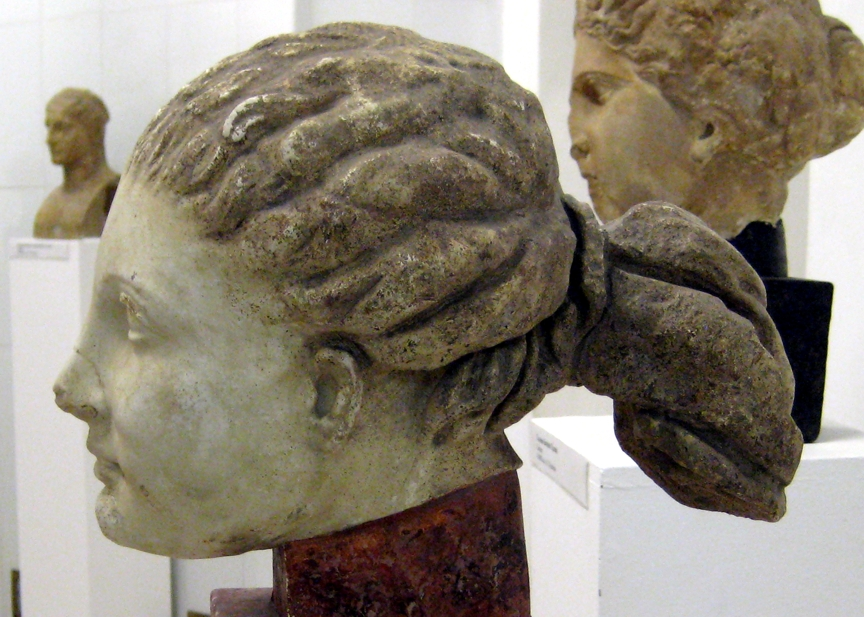
Cast of Polyhymnia, Pushkin Museum, Moscow

== See also ==
- Muses in popular culture
- Asteroid 33 Polyhymnia
