= Bolbe =

Oceanid of Greek mythology

In Greek mythology, Bolbe (/ˈbɒlbiː/; Ancient Greek: Βόλβη) was a beautiful lake goddess or nymph, who dwelled in a Macedonian lake of the same name (modern Lake Volvi). Like other lake gods and goddesses, Bolbe's offspring were Limnades, nymphs who live in freshwater lakes. According to Athenaeus, Bolbe was the mother of Olynthus by Heracles.
