= Thalia (Muse) =

Muse of comedy in Greek mythology

- Goddess of Comedy
- Member of the Muses
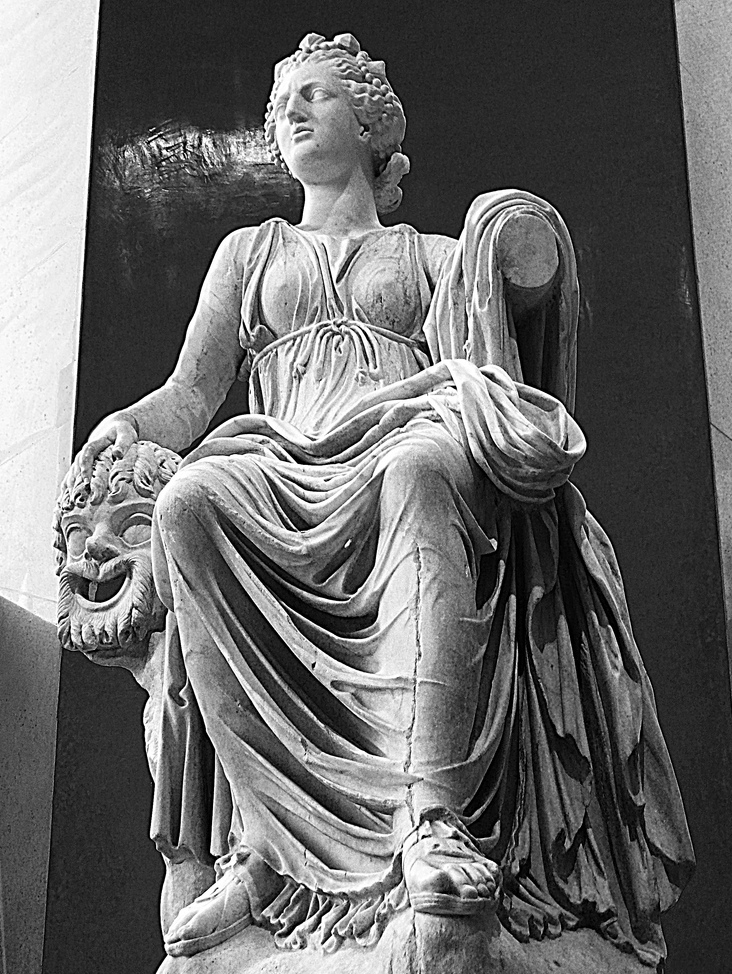
- Roman statue of Thalia from Hadrian's villa, now at the Prado Museum (Madrid)

Genealogy
- Parents: Zeus and Mnemosyne
- Siblings: Euterpe, Polyhymnia, Urania, Clio, Erato, Calliope, Terpsichore, Melpomene
- Consort: Apollo
- Children: the Corybantes

In Greek mythology, Thalia (/θəˈlaɪə/ or /ˈθeɪliə/; Ancient Greek: Θάλεια; "the joyous, the flourishing", from Ancient Greek: θάλλειν, thállein; "to flourish, to be verdant"), also spelled Thaleia, was one of the Muses, the goddess who presided over comedy and idyllic poetry. In this context her name means "flourishing", because the praises in her songs flourish through time.

== Appearance ==
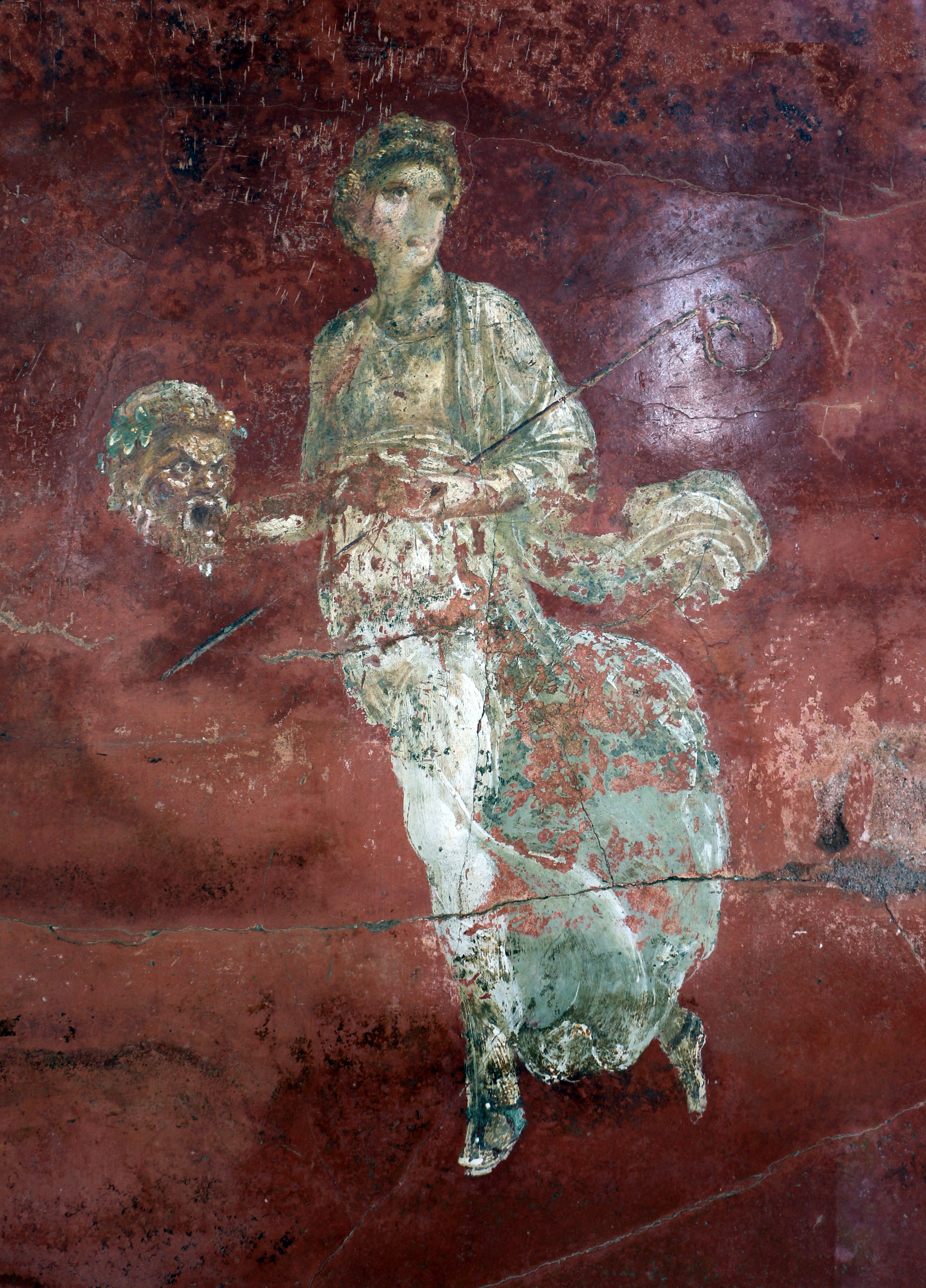
Thalia on an antique fresco from Pompeii

Thalia was portrayed as a young woman with a joyous air, crowned with ivy, wearing boots and holding a comic mask in her hand. Many of her statues also hold a bugle and a trumpet, or occasionally a shepherd's staff or a wreath of ivy.

== Family ==
Thalia was the daughter of Zeus and Mnemosyne, the eighth-born of the nine Muses. According to Apollodorus, she and Apollo were the parents of the Corybantes.

== See also ==
- Thalia (Grace)
- Thalia (Nereid)
- Thalia (nymph)
