= Eloquence =

Rhetoric

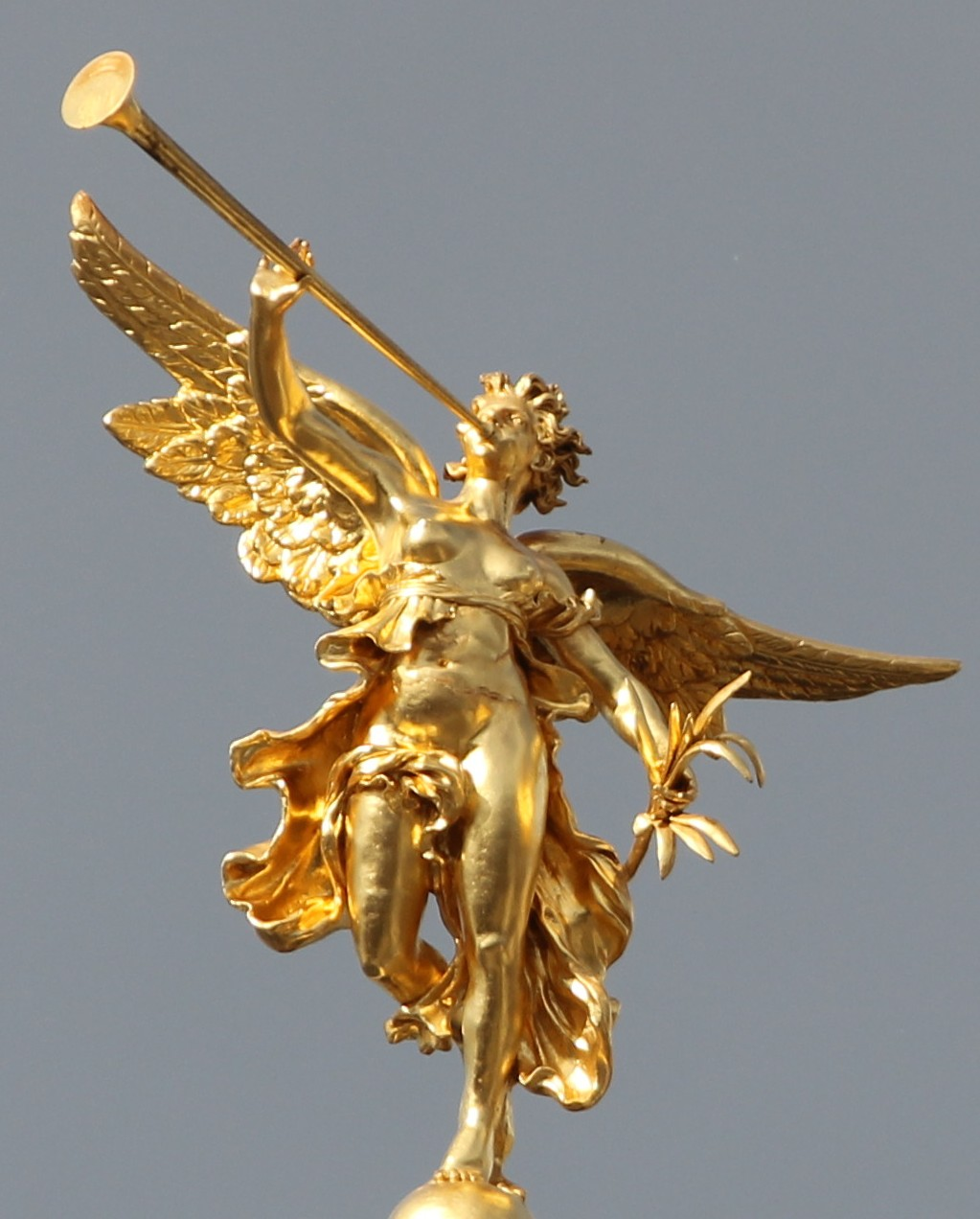
Statue of Eloquence at the Palais du parlement de Bretagne, Rennes

Eloquence (from French eloquence from Latin eloquentia) is the quality of speech or writing that is marked by fluency, elegancy, and persuasiveness. It is also defined as one of the aims of formal oratory and, in this context, refers to the artistic expression of the speech as opposed to its argumentation.

Eloquence is both a natural talent and improved by knowledge of language, study of a specific subject to be addressed, philosophy, rationale and ability to form a persuasive set of tenets within a presentation.

"True eloquence," Oliver Goldsmith says, "Does not consist ... in saying great things in a sublime style, but in a simple style; for there is, properly speaking, no such thing as a sublime style, the sublimity lies only in the things; and when they are not so, the language may be turgid, affected, metaphorical, but not affecting."

== Eloquence in antiquity ==
The word eloquence itself derives from the Latin roots: ē (a shortened form of the preposition ex), meaning "out (of)", and loqui, a deponent verb meaning "to speak". Thus, eloquence is to speak fluently and understand and master language so as to employ a graceful style with persuasiveness, or gracefulness in interpretation and communication.

The concept of eloquence could date back to the rhetoric of the ancient Greeks, Calliope (one of the nine daughters of Zeus and Mnemosyne) being the Muse of epic poetry and eloquence. Hermes, the Greek God, was a patron of eloquence. Cicero, a rhetorician and prolific author, was well-regarded in Ancient Rome as an orator of excellent eloquence.

== Renaissance eloquence ==
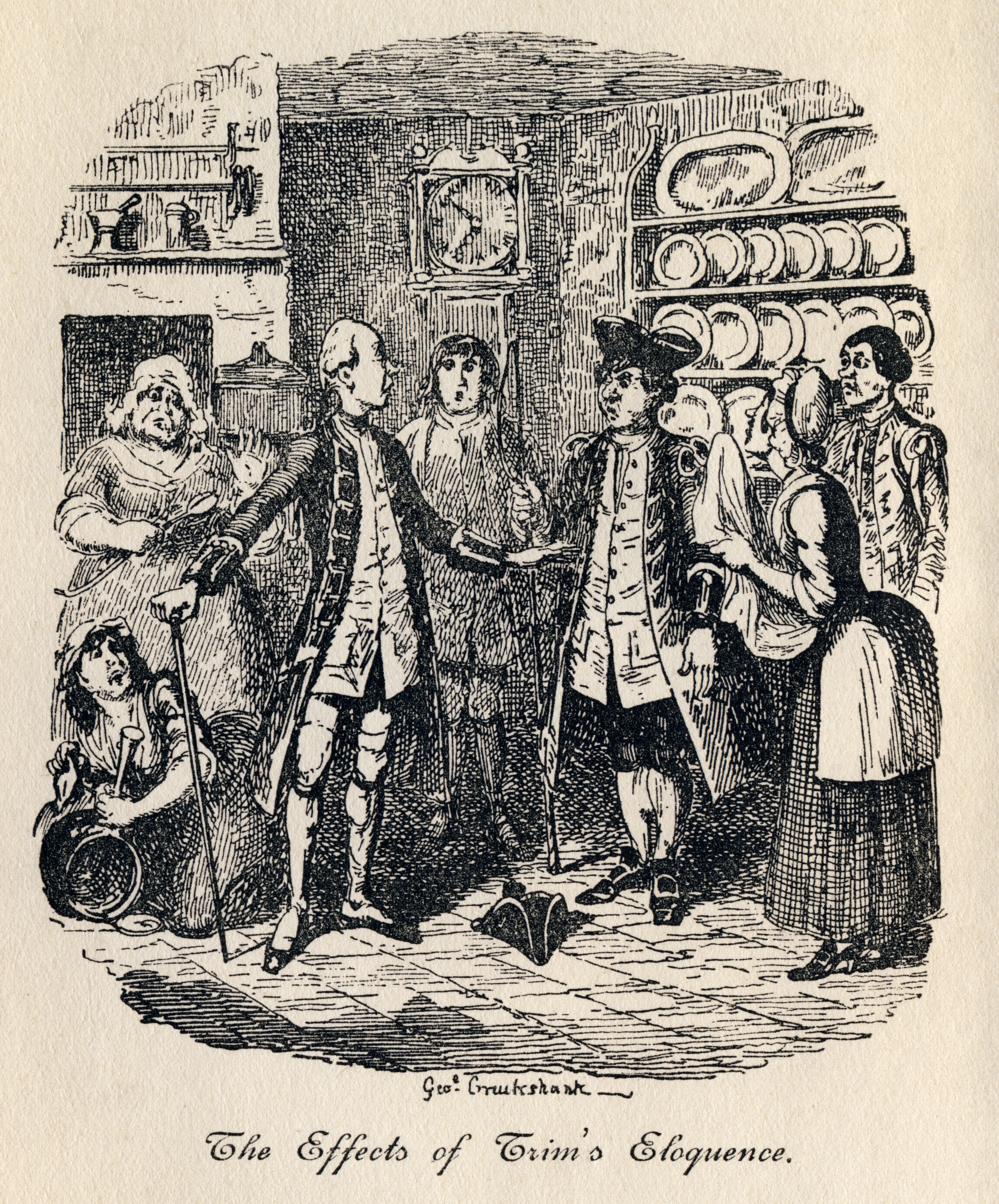
"The Effects of Trim's Eloquence". George Cruikshank's illustration to Laurence Sterne's The Life and Opinions of Tristram Shandy, Gentleman

The Renaissance humanists focused on the correlation of speech and political principles as a powerful tool to present and persuade others to particular concepts. At the core of presentations was the use of graceful style, clear concise grammar and usage, and over time the insertion of rational and emotional arguments.

Petrarch (Fracesco Petrarca), in his study program of the classics and antiquity (Italian Renaissance) focused attention on language and communication. After mastering language, the goal was to reach a "level of eloquence", to be able to present gracefully, combine thought and reason in a powerful way, so as to persuade others to a point of view. Petrarch encouraged students to imitate the ancient writers, from a language perspective, combining clear and correct speech with moral thought.

Later, Fr. Louis Bourdaloue is regarded as one of the founders of French eloquence.

== Modern politicians and eloquence ==
Many famous political leaders, like Winston Churchill and Martin Luther King Jr. and dictators such as Adolf Hitler and Benito Mussolini rose to prominence in large part due to their eloquence. In the Iranian Revolution, Ruhollah Khomeini came to power in part through the eloquence of his speeches, smuggled into the country on audio cassettes while he was still in exile.

== See also ==
- Persuasion
- Rhetoric
