= Euterpe =

Muse of music (Greek mythology)

- Goddess of Lyric Poetry
- Member of the Muses
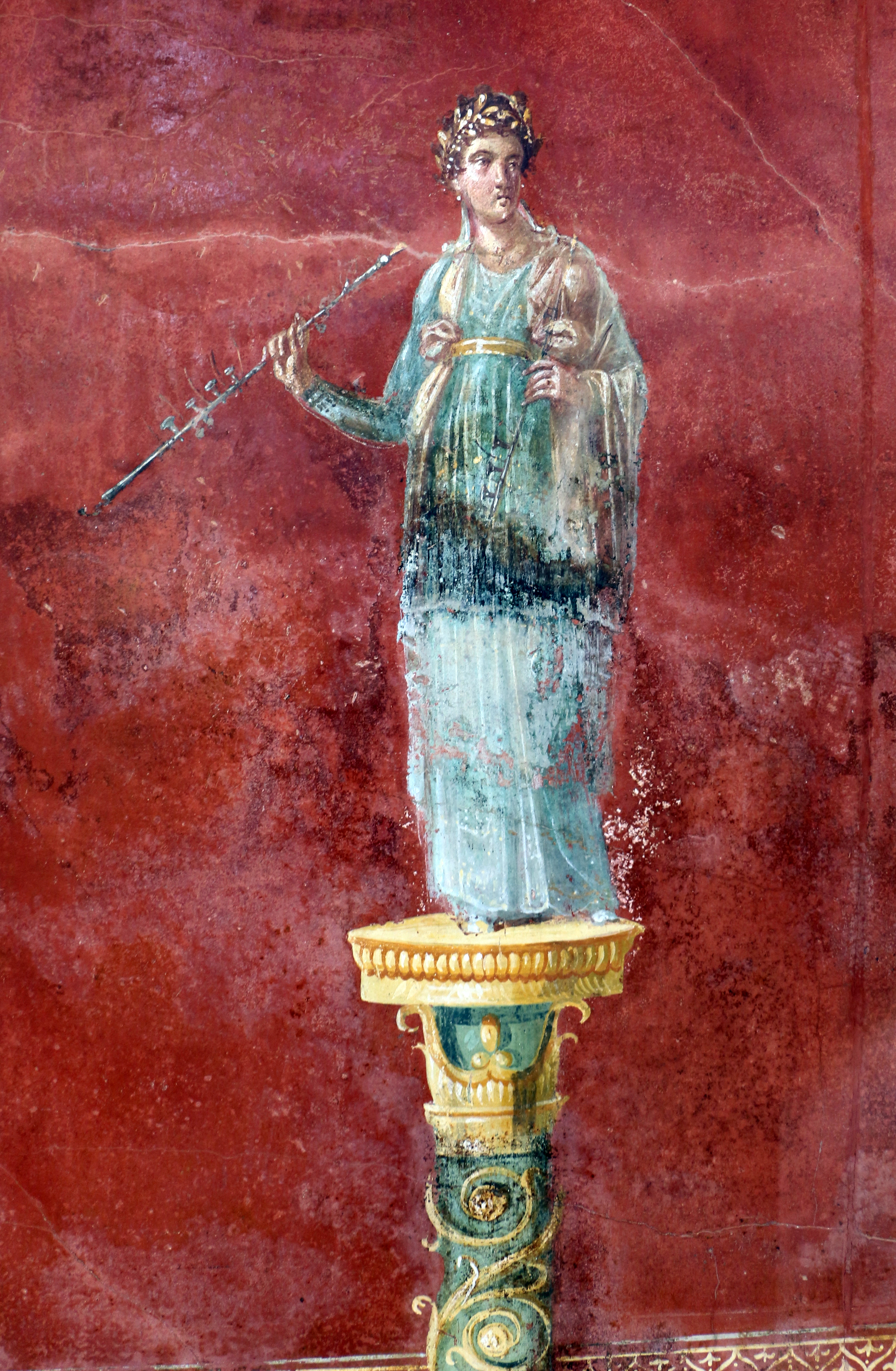
- Euterpe on an antique fresco from Pompeii
- Abode: Mount Olympus
- Symbols: Double flute

Genealogy
- Parents: Zeus and Mnemosyne
- Siblings: Calliope, Polyhymnia, Urania, Clio, Erato, Thalia, Terpsichore, Melpomene and several paternal half-siblings
- Consort: Strymon, Apollo
- Children: Rhesus, Orpheus

Euterpe (/juːˈtɜːrpiː/; Greek: Εὐτέρπη, lit. 'rejoicing well' or 'delight' [eu̯térpɛː], from Ancient Greek: εὖ, romanized: eû, lit. 'well' + Greek: τέρπειν, romanized: térpein, lit. 'to please') was one of the Muses in Greek mythology, presiding over music. In late Classical times, she was named muse of lyric poetry. She has been called "Giver of delight" by ancient poets.

== Mythology ==
Euterpe was born as one of the daughters of Mnemosyne, Titan goddess of memory, and fathered by Zeus, god of the gods. Her sisters include Calliope (muse of epic poetry), Clio (muse of history), Melpomene (muse of tragedy), Terpsichore (muse of dancing), Erato (muse of erotic poetry), Thalia (muse of comedy), Polyhymnia (muse of hymns), and Urania (muse of astronomy). Sometimes they are referred to as water nymphs having been born from the four sacred springs on Helicon which flowed from the ground after Pegasus, the winged horse, stamped his hooves on the ground. The mountain spring Cassotis on Mount Parnassus was sacred to Euterpe and the other Muses. It flowed between two high rocks above the city of Delphi, and in ancient times its sacred waters were retained for the use of the Pythia, the priests, priestesses, as well as the oracle of Apollo.

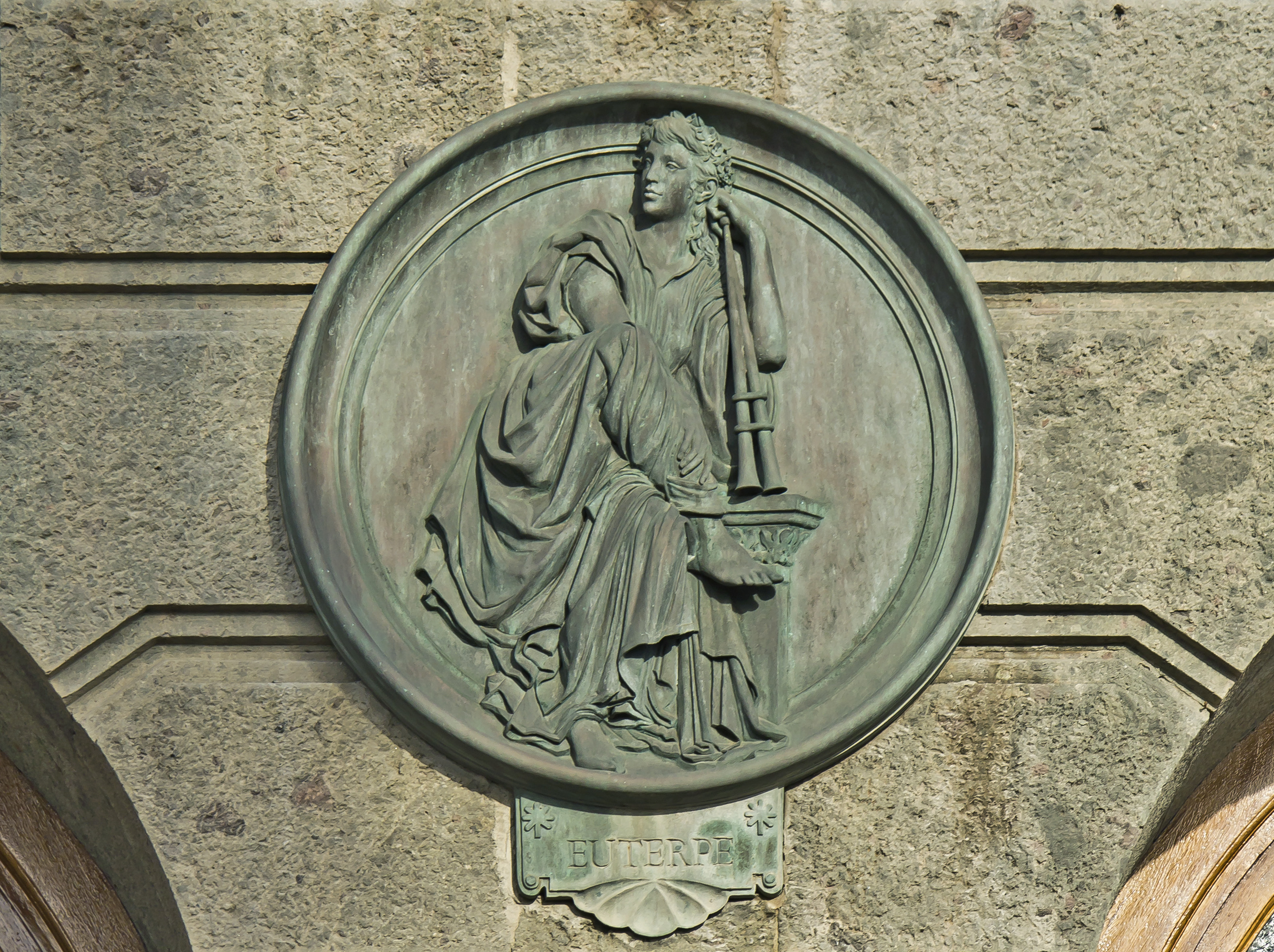
Euterpe Pérez Galdós

Along with her sister Muses, Euterpe was believed to have lived on Mount Olympus where she and her sisters entertained their father and the other Olympian gods with their great artistry. Later on, tradition also placed them on Mount Helicon in Boeotia where there was a major cult center to the goddesses, or on Mount Parnassus where the Castalian spring was a favorite destination for poets and artists.

Some people believe that she invented the aulos or double-flute, though most mythographers credit Marsyas or Athena with its invention. Some say she also invented other wind instruments. Euterpe is often depicted holding a flute in artistic renditions of her.

Pindar and other sources (the author of the Bibliotheca and Servius) describe the Thracian king Rhesus, who appears in the Iliad, as son of Euterpe and the river-god Strymon; Homer calls him son of Eioneus.

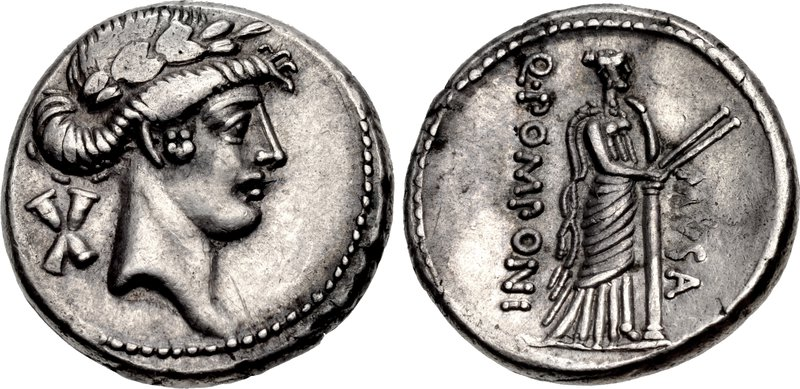
Rome mint. Laureate head of Apollo right; two crossed tibiae behind / Euterpe, the Muse of Music and Lyric Poetry, wearing long flowing tunic and peplum, standing right, supporting her head with her left hand by resting her elbow on column, and holding two tibiae in right hand; Q • POMPONI downwards to left, MVSA downwards to right. Quintus Pomponius Musa

== Functions ==
Euterpe's role, alongside her sisters, was to entertain the gods on Mount Olympus. She was said to have sparked the development of liberal and fine arts in Ancient Greece, serving as an inspiration to poets, dramatists, and authors such as Homer.

Traditionally, musicians would invoke Euterpe to inspire, guide, and assist them in their compositions. Such petitions might take the form of a prayer for divine inspiration from the muse.

== Gallery ==
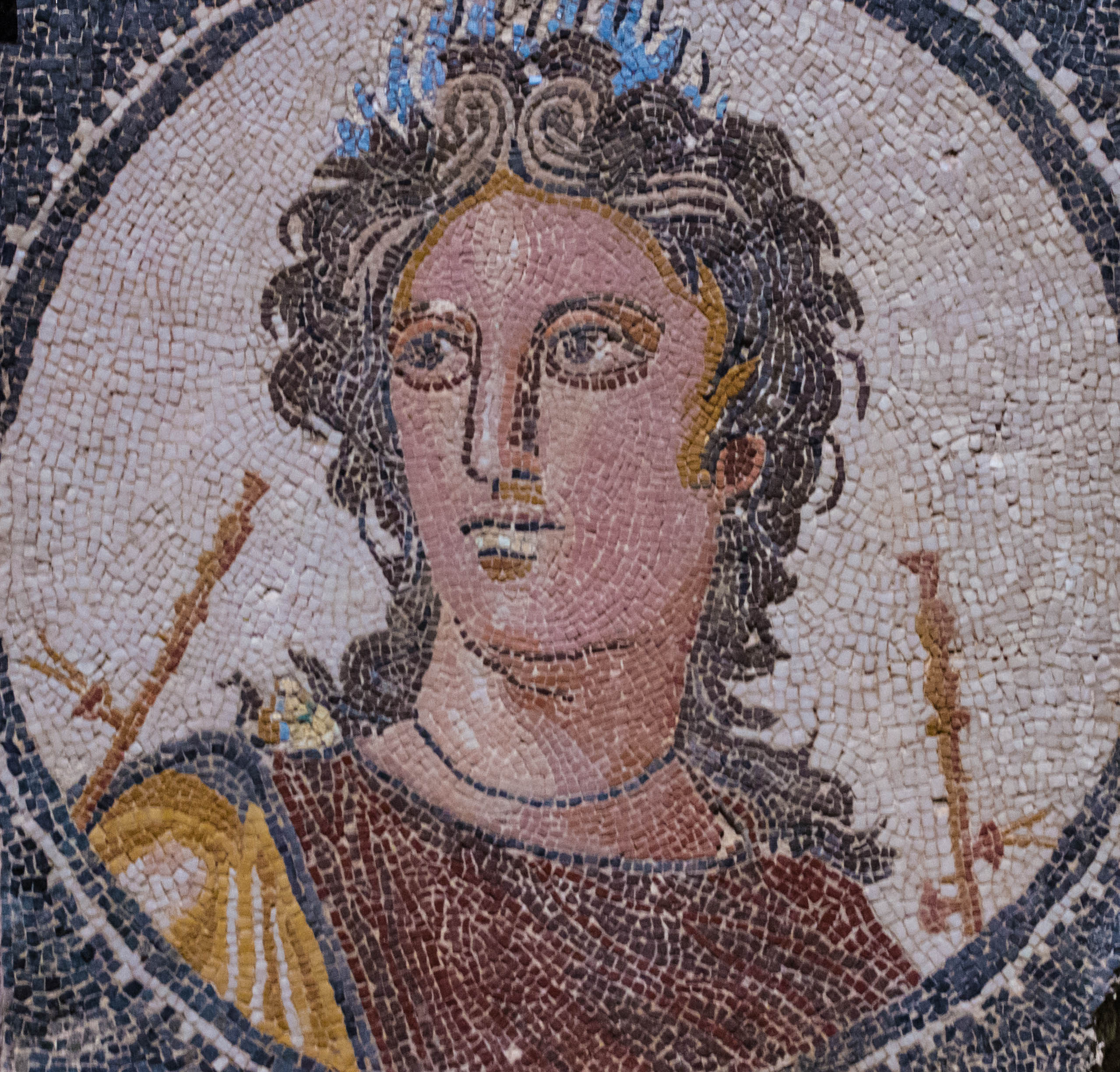
Roman mosaic of Euterpe, 2nd century

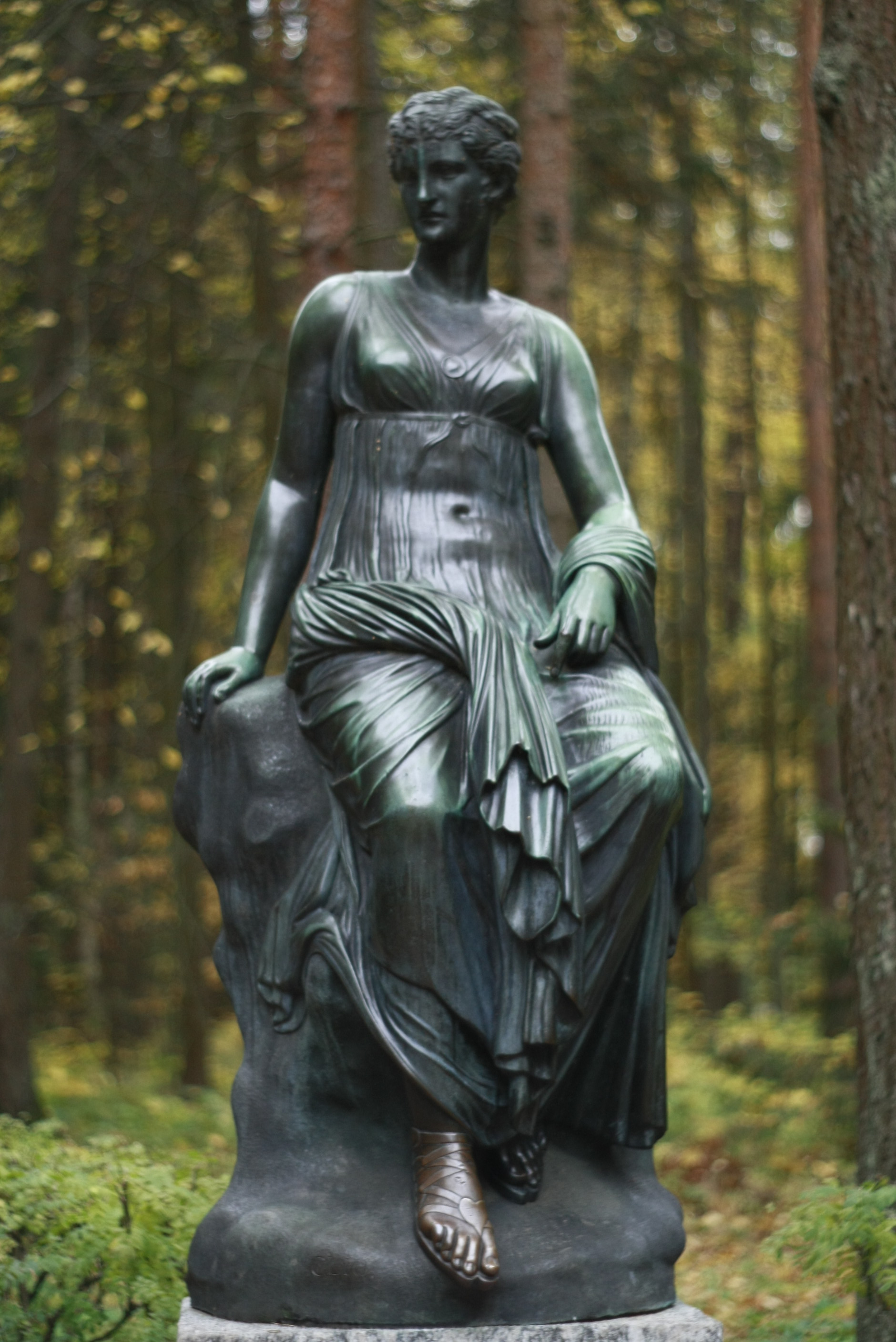
Euterpe statue (St. Petersburg, Pavlovsk, Old Sylvia, Central area)

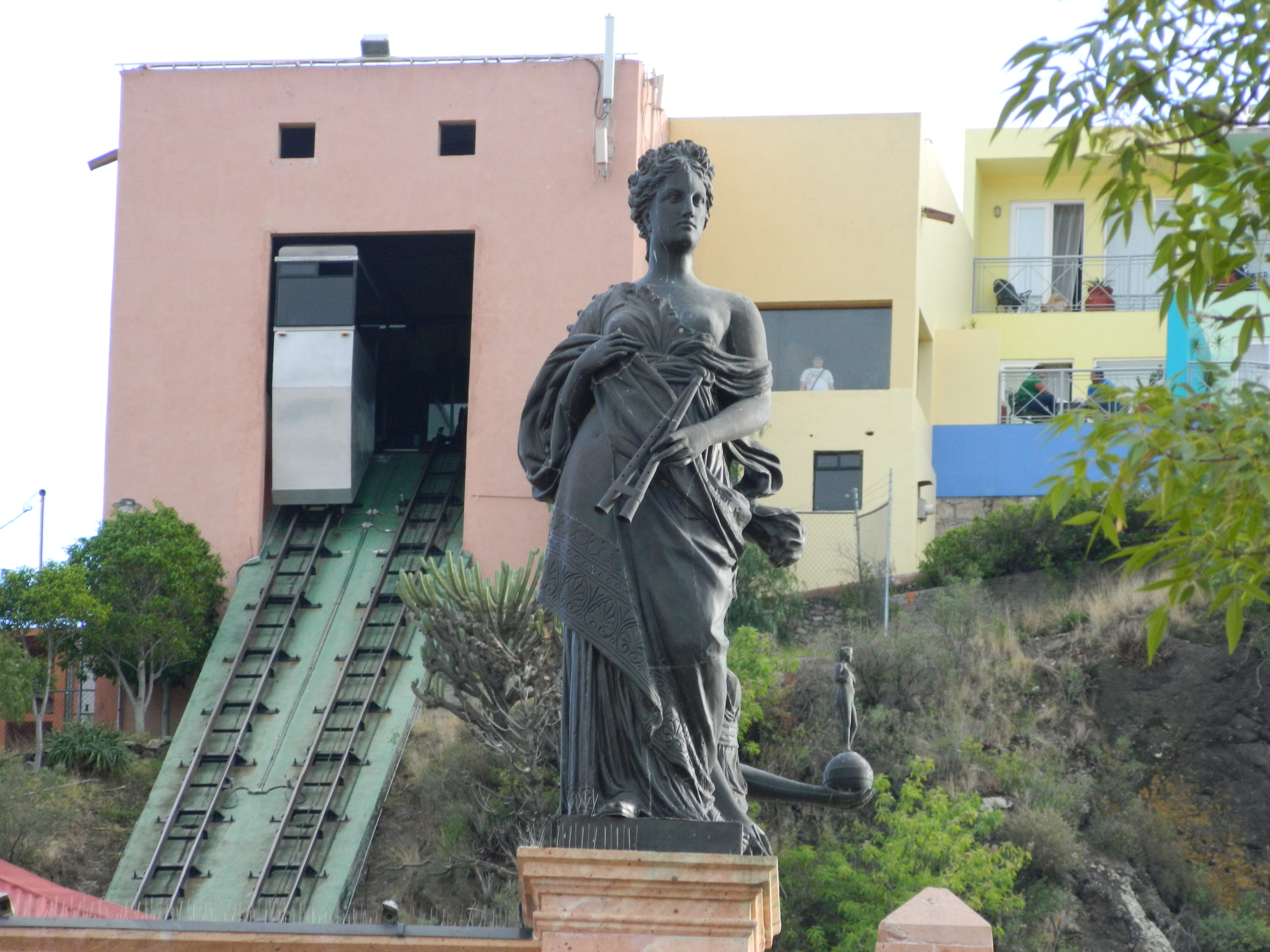
Teatro Juárez

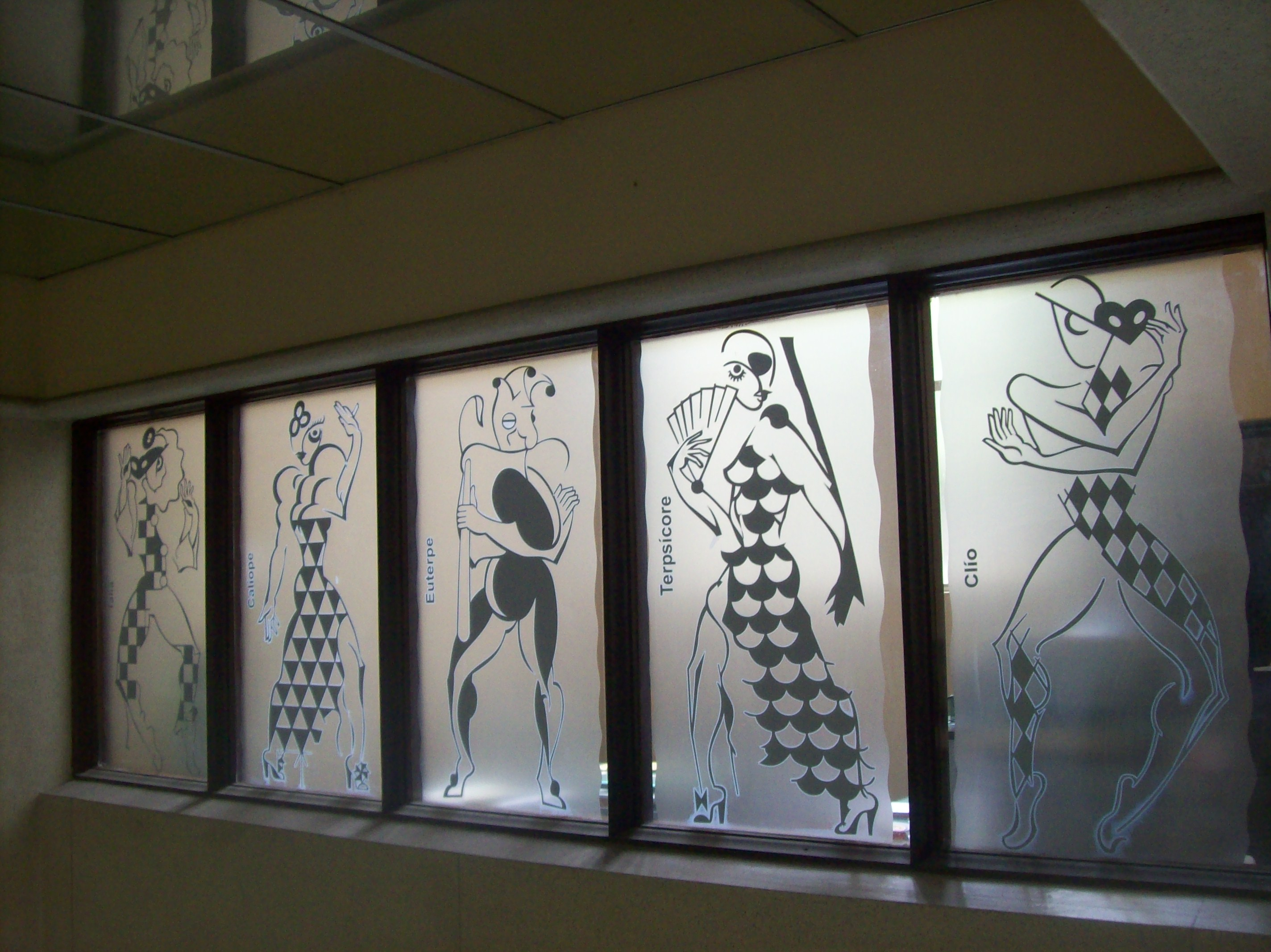
Interior of the Teatro Lido, Medellín

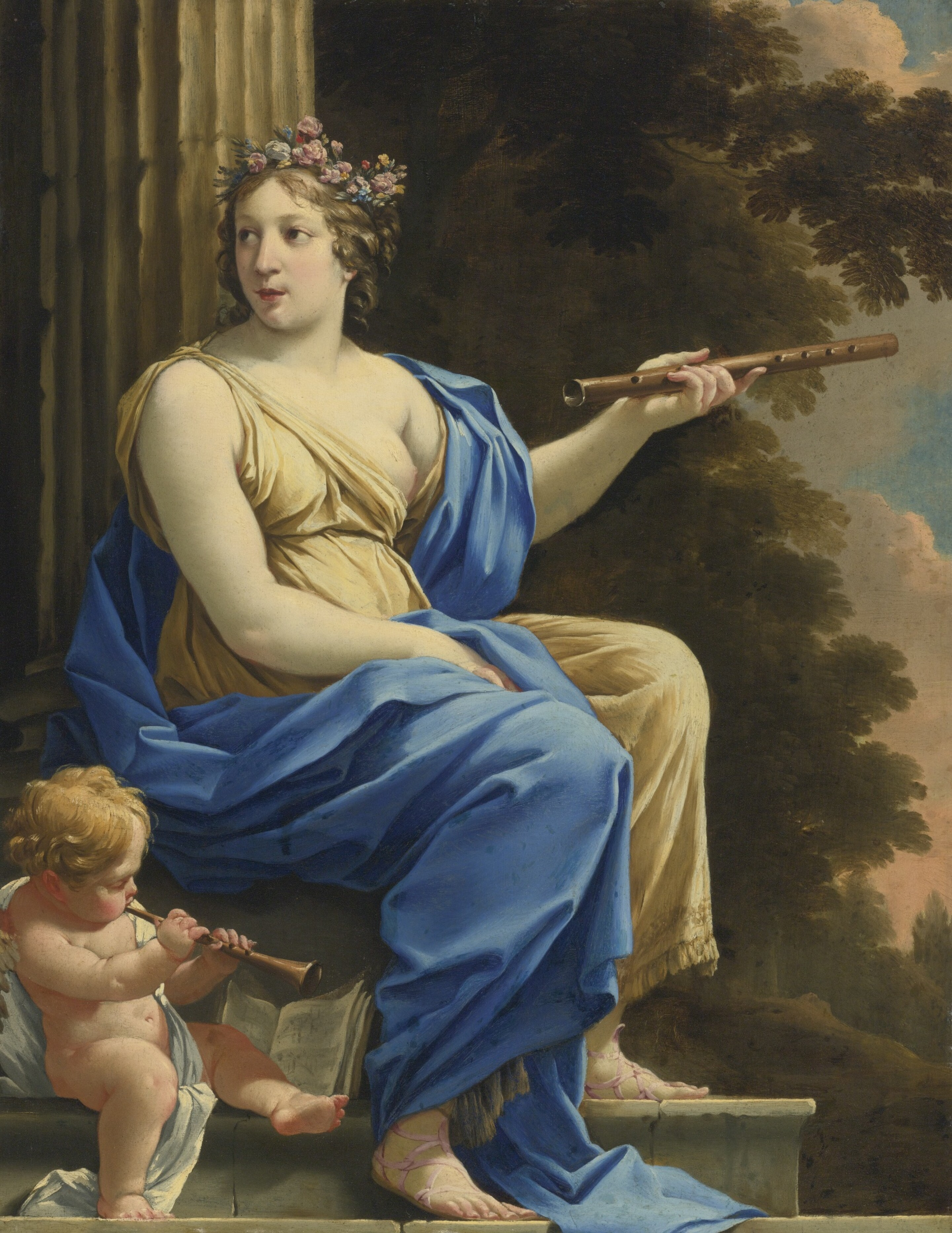
Euterpe, the Muse of music and lyric poetry by Simon Vouet

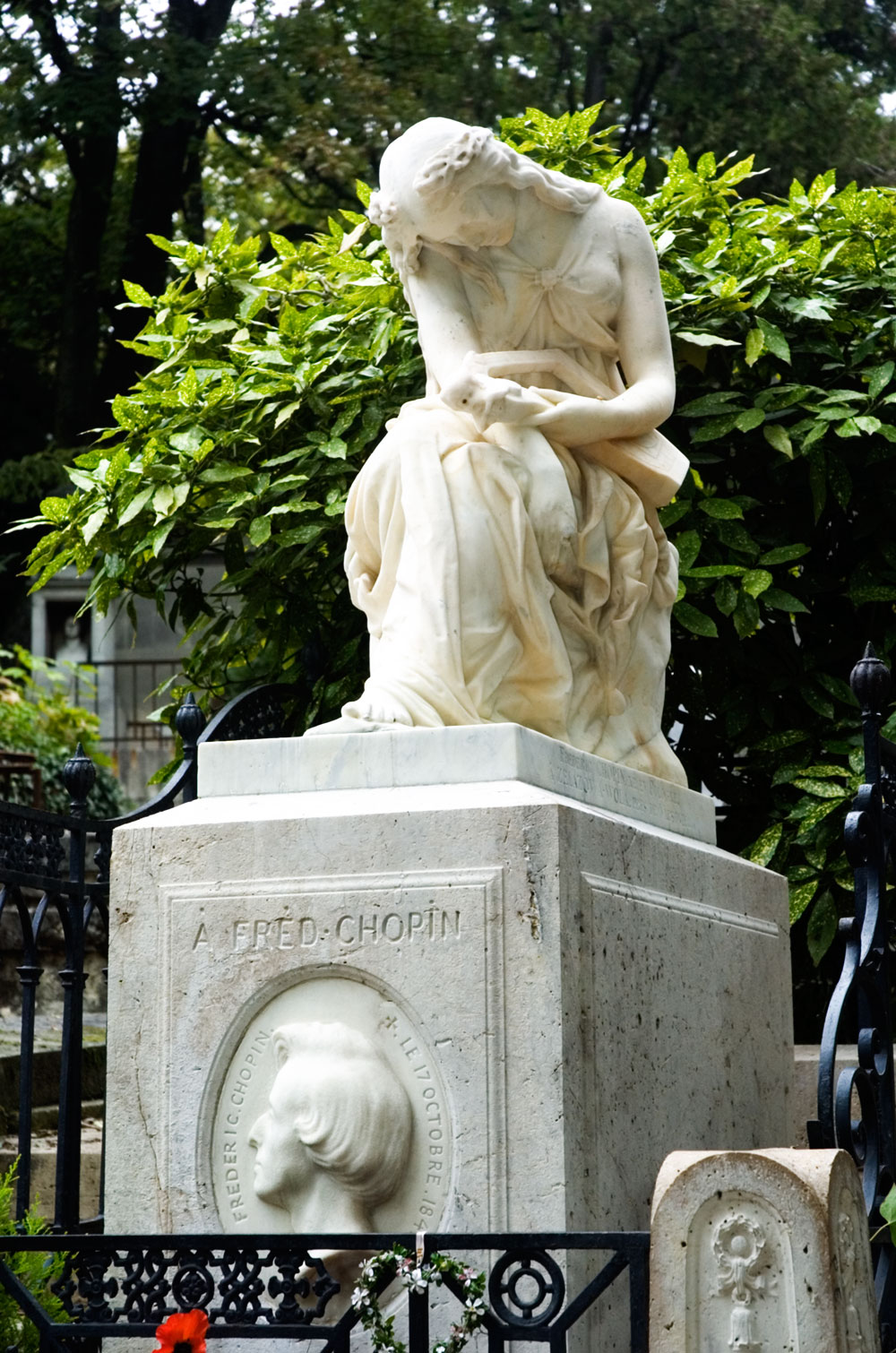
Sculpture of Euterpe at the grave of Frédéric Chopin at Père Lachaise Cemetery, Paris, France

== Bibliography ==
- Apollodorus, The Library with an English Translation by Sir James George Frazer, F.B.A., F.R.S. in 2 Volumes, Cambridge, MA, Harvard University Press; London, William Heinemann Ltd. 1921. ISBN 0-674-99135-4. Online version at the Perseus Digital Library. Greek text available from the same website.
- Euripides, The Rhesus of Euripides translated into English rhyming verse with explanatory notes by Gilbert Murray, LL.D., D.Litt., F.B.A., Regius Professor of Greek in the University of Oxford. Euripides. Gilbert Murray. New York. Oxford University Press. 1913. Online version at the Perseus Digital Library.
- Euripides, Euripidis Fabulae. vol. 3. Gilbert Murray. Oxford. Clarendon Press, Oxford. 1913. Greek text available at the Perseus Digital Library.
- Hesiod, Theogony from The Homeric Hymns and Homerica with an English Translation by Hugh G. Evelyn-White, Cambridge, MA., Harvard University Press; London, William Heinemann Ltd. 1914. Online version at the Perseus Digital Library. Greek text available from the same website.
- Homer, The Iliad with an English Translation by A.T. Murray, Ph.D. in two volumes. Cambridge, MA., Harvard University Press; London, William Heinemann, Ltd. 1924. ISBN 978-0674995796. Online version at the Perseus Digital Library.
- Homer, Homeri Opera in five volumes. Oxford, Oxford University Press. 1920. ISBN 978-0198145318. Greek text available at the Perseus Digital Library.
- Maurus Servius Honoratus, In Vergilii carmina comentarii. Servii Grammatici qui feruntur in Vergilii carmina commentarii; recensuerunt Georgius Thilo et Hermannus Hagen. Georgius Thilo. Leipzig. B. G. Teubner. 1881. Online version at the Perseus Digital Library.
