= Rhesus (play) =

Tragic play often attributed to Euripides

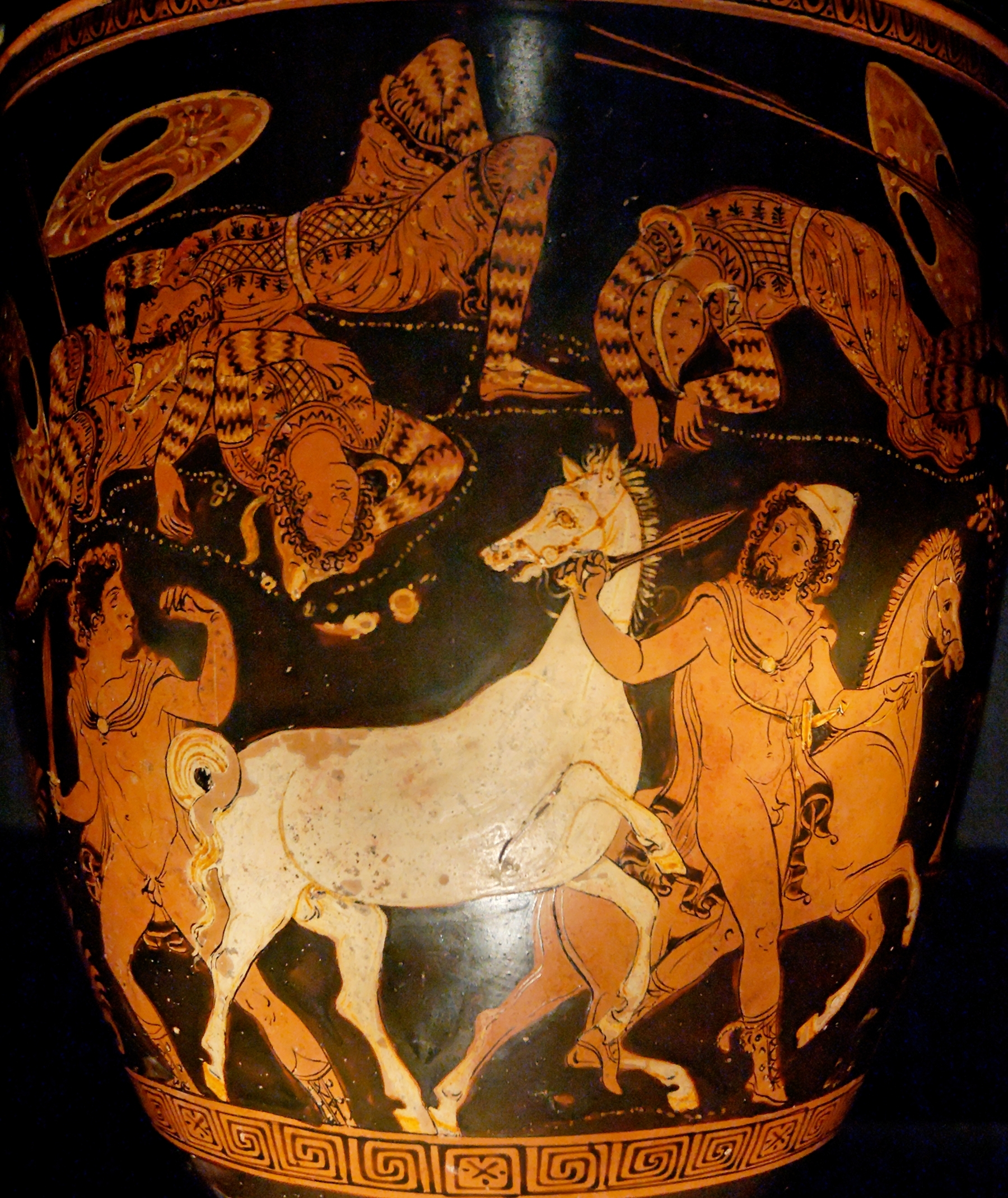
- Odysseus and Diomedes stealing Rhesus' horses, red-figure situla by the Lycurgus Painter, ca. 360 BC.
- Written by: Euripides (disputed)
- Chorus: Trojan sentries
- Characters: Odysseus; Hector; Diomedes; Aeneas; Paris; Dolon; Athena; Messenger; Shepherd; Muse; Rhesus
- Original language: Ancient Greek
- Subject: Trojan War
- Genre: Athenian tragedy
- Setting: Before Hector's tent at the gates of Troy

Premiere
- Date premiered: Unknown

Rhesus (Ancient Greek: Ῥῆσος, Rhēsos) is an Athenian tragedy that belongs to the transmitted plays of Euripides. Its authorship has been disputed since antiquity, and the issue has invested modern scholarship since the 17th century when the play's authenticity was challenged, first by Joseph Scaliger and subsequently by others, partly on aesthetic grounds and partly on account of peculiarities in the play's vocabulary, style and technique. The conventional attribution to Euripides remains controversial.

Rhesus takes place during the Trojan War, on the night when Odysseus and Diomedes make their way covertly into the Trojan camp. The same event is narrated in book 10 of Homer's epic poem, the Iliad.

== Plot synopsis ==
In the middle of the night, Trojan guards on the lookout for suspicious enemy activity sight bright fires in the Greek camp. They promptly inform Hector, who almost issues a general call to arms before Aeneas persuades him this would be ill-advised. The best course, Aeneas argues, would be to send someone to spy on the Greek camp and see what the enemy is up to. Dolon volunteers to spy on the Greeks in exchange for Achilles's horses when the war is won. Hector accepts the offer and sends him out. Dolon leaves wearing the skin of a wolf, and planning on deceiving the Greeks by walking on all fours. Next, Rhesus, the king of the distant but contiguous nation of Thrace, arrives to assist the Trojans soon after Dolon sets out. Hector berates him for coming so many years late, but accepts his arrival; Rhesus responds that he had intended on coming from the beginning, but had been sidetracked defending his own land from an attack by Scythians.

Meanwhile, making their way to the Trojan encampment with the intention of killing Hector, Odysseus and Diomedes run into Dolon and kill him. When they reach their destination Athena guides them to Rhesus' sleeping quarters instead of Hector's, warning them that they are not destined to kill Hector. Diomedes kills Rhesus and others, and Odysseus takes his prized horses, before making their escape. Rumors spread from Rhesus' men that there had been treachery and that Hector was responsible. Hector arrives and casts blame on the sentinels, for, pointing to the sly tactics indicating that the guilty party could only be Odysseus. The mother of Rhesus, one of the nine muses, then arrives and lays blame on all those responsible: Odysseus, Diomedes, and Athena. She also announces the imminent resurrection of Rhesus, who will become immortal but will be sent to live in a cave.

This short play is most notable in comparison with the Iliad. Here, Dolon's role is pushed to the background, and much more is revealed about Rhesus and the reactions of the Trojans to his murder.

== Authorship controversy ==
The first since ancient times to fully dispute that the Rhesus had been written by Euripides was L. C. Valckenaer in his Phoenissae (1755) and Diatribe in Euripidis deperditorum dramatum reliquias (1767). In an introduction to Rhesus, Gilbert Murray wrote that passages from the play were quoted by early Alexandrian writers. The ancient hypotheses transmitted along with the play, however, show that its authenticity was attacked by a number of scholars whose names are not given. Cases against Euripides' authorship generally center on stylistic differences. Murray argued that these may be attributable simply to the play being an early work by a younger or less-developed Euripides, or the possibility of its being an edited version of a Euripidean play, perhaps made by a contemporary or by Euripides' son. Edith Hall argued in an introduction that modern readers "will be struck in particular by the un-Euripidean lack of interest in women," and noted the fact of Euripides' son having borne the tragedian's name as an argument against the conventional attribution. A recent theory by Vayos Liapis is that the Rhesus was composed by an unknown author in the court of Philip II or Alexander the Great at the end of the 4th century BC.

Richmond Lattimore asserted in 1958 that the Rhesus had been written by Euripides, probably at some point before 440 BC, and in 1964, William Ritchie defended the play's authenticity in a book-length study, though his conclusions were opposed by Eduard Fraenkel. Michael Walton has also claimed that modern scholarship agrees with classical authorities in ascribing the play to Euripides, but admitted in a later work that the attribution is still disputed by a number of scholars.

== Translations ==
- Robert Potter, 1783 – verse: full text
- Michael Wodhull, 1809 – verse: The Nineteen Tragedies and Fragments of Euripides, Vol. II full text: Internet Archive
- Edward P. Coleridge, 1891 – prose: The Plays of Euripides full text: Perseus
- Arthur S. Way, 1896 – verse: The Tragedies of Euripides in English Verse, Vol. II full text: Internet Archive
- Gilbert Murray, 1913 – verse: The Rhesus of Euripides full text: Perseus
- Richmond Lattimore, 1958 – verse: available for digital loan
- James Morwood, 2000 – In Bacchae and Other Plays, Oxford World's Classics. ISBN 9780199540525
- John Davie, 2005 – prose in The Bacchae and Other Plays, Penguin Classics. ISBN 9780140447262
- George Theodoridis, 2010 – prose: full text
- Brian Vinero, 2025 – rhymed verse,

== Sources ==
- Hall, Edith. 2008. Introduction. In Bacchae and Other Plays, Oxford World's Classics. ISBN 0199540527.
- Walton, J. Michael. 1997. Introduction. In Plays VI. By Euripides. Methuen Classical Greek Dramatists ser. London: Methuen. vii–xxii. ISBN 0-413-71650-3.
- Walton, J. Michael, Euripides Our Contemporary, University of California Press, 2009, ISBN 0520261798.
