= Limnades =

Name for nymphs in Greek mythology

In the Idylls of Theocritus, there is mention of a group of nymphs under the name "Limnades" (/ˈlɪmnædz, -nədz/; Ancient Greek: Λιμνάδες). In Neil Hopkinson's translation, they are referred to as "Nymphs of the lake".
