= Calliope =

Muse of epic poetry

- Goddess of Epic Poetry
- Member of the Muses
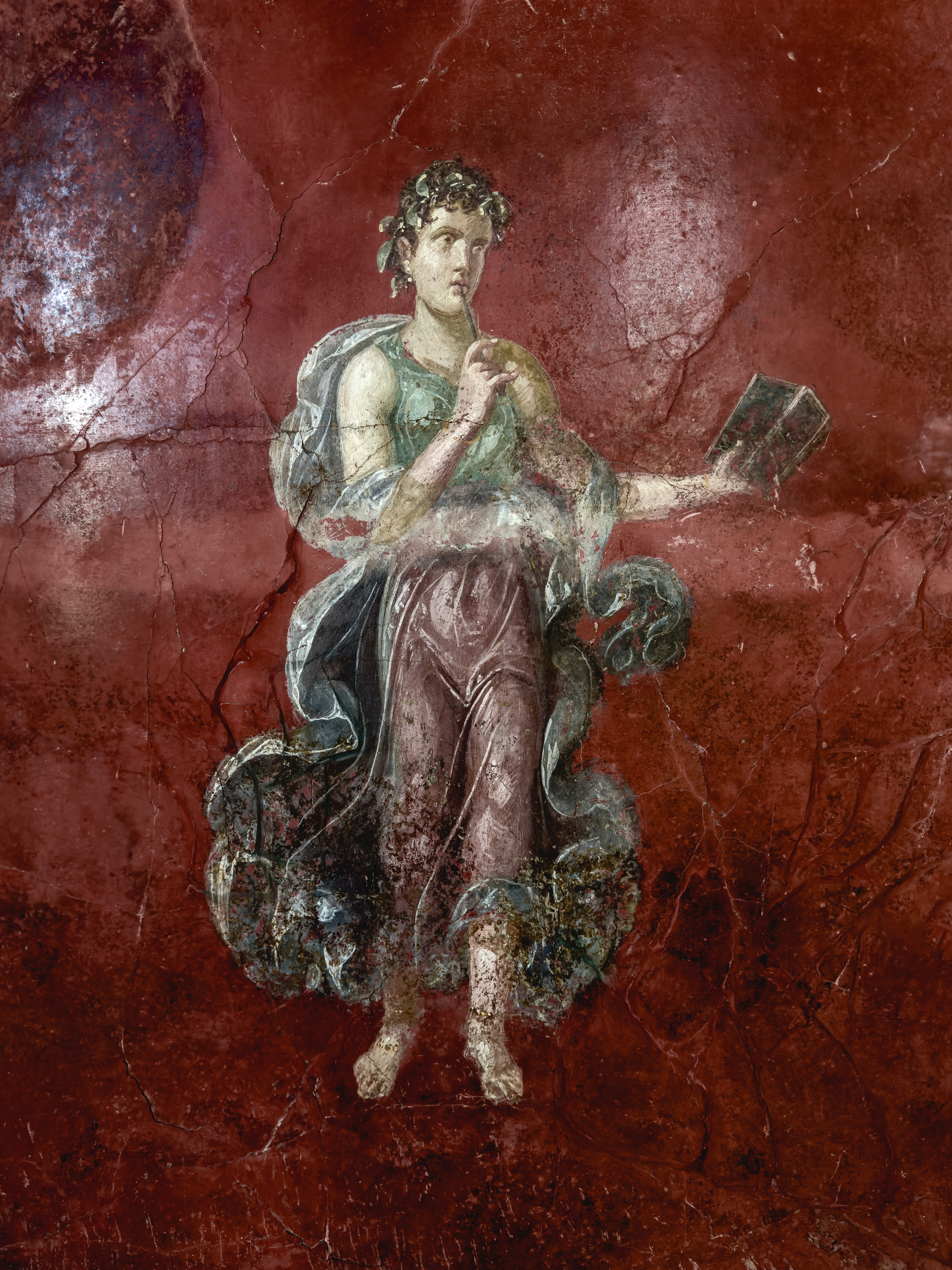
- Fresco of Calliope, muse of epic poetry, from the Villa Moregine, western triclinium A
- Abode: Mount Olympus
- Symbols: Lyre

Genealogy
- Parents: Zeus and Mnemosyne
- Siblings: Euterpe, Polyhymnia, Urania, Clio, Erato, Thalia, Terpsichore, Melpomene and several paternal half-siblings
- Consort: Apollo, Oeagrus, Zeus
- Children: Orpheus, Linus, the Corybantes

In Greek mythology, Calliope (/kəˈlaɪ.əpi/ kə-LY-ə-pee; Ancient Greek: Καλλιόπη, romanized: Kalliópē, lit. 'beautiful-voiced') is the Muse who presides over eloquence and epic poetry, so called from the ecstatic harmony of her voice. Hesiod and Ovid called her the "Chief of all Muses".

== Mythology ==
Calliope had two famous sons, Orpheus and Linus, by either Apollo or King Oeagrus of Thrace. She taught Orpheus verses for singing. According to Hesiod, she was also the wisest of the Muses, as well as the most assertive. Calliope married Oeagrus in Pimpleia, a town near Mount Olympus. She is said to have defeated the daughters of Pierus, king of Thessaly, in a singing match, and then, to punish their presumption, turned them into magpies.

In some accounts, Calliope is the mother of the Corybantes by her father Zeus. Phrontis, thought by Daniel Albert Wyttenbach to be the mother of Lysis, is also described as Calliope's daughter according to Plutarch's Moralia.

She was sometimes believed to be Homer's muse for the Iliad and the Odyssey. The Roman epic poet Virgil invokes her in the Aeneid ("Aid, O Calliope, the martial song!"). In some cases, she is said to be the mother of Sirens by the river-god Achelous. Another account adds that Calliope bore Rhesus to the river-god Strymon.

== Depictions ==
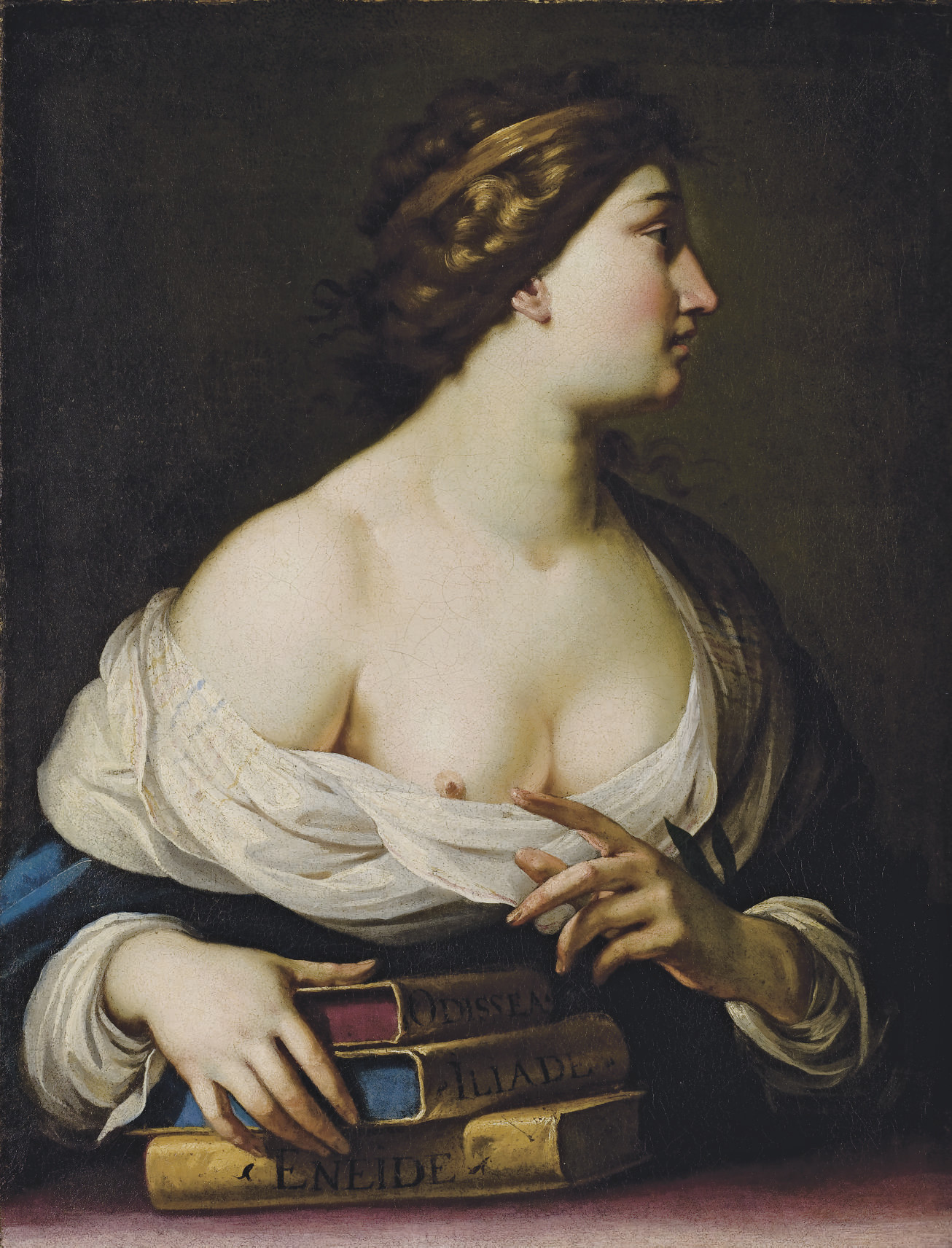
Calliope, muse de l'éloquence et de la poésie épique (Calliope, muse of eloquence and epic poetry)

Calliope is usually shown with a writing tablet in her hand. At times, she is depicted carrying a roll of paper or a book, or wearing a gold crown. She is also depicted with her children.

The Italian poet Dante Alighieri, in his Divine Comedy, refers to Calliope:

Here rise to life again, dead poetry!
Let it, O holy Muses, for I am yours,
And here Calliope, strike a higher key,
Accompanying my song with that sweet air
which made the wretched Magpies feel a blow
that turned all hope of pardon to despair

— Dante, trans. Esolen, "Purgatorio", Canto I, lines 7 to 12

== Honours ==
Calliope Beach in Antarctica is named after the muse, as is the calliope hummingbird of North and Central America, and the calliope steam organ. Calliope Saddle is part of the Thisbe Valley Track in the Catlins Forest, South Otago, NZ. The Queensland town of Calliope is another location named after the muse, and is located in central Queensland.

== See also ==
- Muses in popular culture
