= List of shipwrecks in 1789 =

The List of shipwrecks in 1789 includes some ships sunk, wrecked or otherwise lost during 1789.

table of contents
1789
Jan	Feb	Mar	Apr
May	Jun	Jul	Aug
Sep	Oct	Nov	Dec
Unknown date

== January ==
=== 1 January ===
List of shipwrecks: 1 January 1789
Ship	State	Description
Zee Nymph	Bremen	The ship was wrecked off Boulogne, France with the loss of her captain. She was on a voyage from Bordeaux, France to Bremen.

=== 6 January ===
List of shipwrecks: 6 January 1789
Ship	State	Description
La Patrie	France	The ship foundered whilst on a voyage from Port-au-Prince, Saint-Domingue to Nantes. Her crew were rescued.

=== 8 January ===
List of shipwrecks: 8 January 1789
Ship	State	Description
Friends	Great Britain	The brigantine was driven ashore and sank at Plymouth, Devon. Her crew were rescued. She was on a voyage from Cork, Ireland to Plymouth.

=== 13 January ===
List of shipwrecks: 13 January 1789
Ship	State	Description
Friends Endeavour	Great Britain	The sloop was driven ashore and severely damaged at Causand, Cornwall.

=== 17 January ===
List of shipwrecks: 17 January 1789
Ship	State	Description
La Cornelia	France	The ship was driven ashore and wrecked at St. Lucar, Spain. Her crew were rescued. She was on a voyage from "Wyborg" to Seville, Spain.

=== 18 January ===
List of shipwrecks: 18 January 1789
Ship	State	Description
Nancy	Great Britain	The whaler was driven ashore 5 leagues (15 nautical miles (28 km) south east of Bassa. Her crew were rescued. She was on a voyage from London to the South Seas.

=== 24 January ===
List of shipwrecks: 24 January 1789
Ship	State	Description
Princess Royal	Great Britain	The ship was driven ashore and wrecked at Liverpool, Lancashire. She was on a voyage from Havana, Cuba to Liverpool.

=== Unknown date ===
List of shipwrecks: Unknown date in January 1789
Ship	State	Description
Biscayneer	Great Britain	The ship was driven ashore and severely damaged in the Isles of Scilly. She was on a voyage from Newfoundland, British America to Barnstaple and Dartmouth, Devon.
Christian & Peggy	Great Britain	The ship was lost at Porto, Portugal. Her crew were rescued. She was on a voyage from Greenock, Renfrewshire to Porto.
Collins	Great Britain	The ship sank near "Church Hole".
Colonel Fullerton	Great Britain	The ship foundered off St. Lucar, Spain. Her crew were rescued. She was on a voyage from Newfoundland] to Cádiz, Spain.
Daniel	Stettin	The ship was sunk by ice in the Garonne. She was on a voyage from Stettin to Bordeaux
Concord	Ireland	The ship was driven ashore near Helvoet, Dutch Republic. She was on a voyage from Dublin to Rotterdam, Dutch Republic.
Douglas	Ireland	The ship was lost at Waterford with the loss of all but one of her crew. She was on a voyage from Waterford to Greenock.
Duc de Chartres	France	The ship was sunk by ice in the Garonne. She was on a voyage from Saint-Domingue to Bordeaux.
Emaculada Conception	France	The ship foundered in the English Channel off Dieppe. She was on a voyage from Falmouth, Cornwall, Great Britain to Ostend, Dutch Republic.
Favourite	Great Britain	The ship was driven ashore near Ramsgate, Kent. She was on a voyage from New York, United States to Hull, Yorkshire.
Florentina	Ireland	The ship was driven ashore near Memel, Prussia. She was on a voyage from Waterford to Memel.
Friends	Great Britain	The ship was driven ashore at Cresswell, Northumberland. She was on a voyage from Dunkirk, France to Newcastle upon Tyne, Northumberland. Friends was later refloated.
Henrietta	Great Britain	The ship was driven ashore near Calais, France . She was on a voyage from Hull, Yorkshire to Havre de Grâce, France.
Jane	Great Britain	The ship was lost in Dundalk Bay with the loss of all hands. She was on a voyage from Greenock to Dublin.
Joyce	Great Britain	The ship was lost at Figueira da Foz, Portugal. She was on a voyage from Figueira da Foz to Dartmouth.
Lancaster	Great Britain	The ship was driven ashore and wrecked between Lambay and Neath, Glamorgan.
Mary	Great Britain	The ship was driven ashore near Waterford. She was on a voyage from Jamaica to London. Mary had been refloated by 14 January.
London Packet	Great Britain	The ship was lost near Coquet Island, Northumberland. She was on a voyage from London to Dundee, Perthshire.
Mary	Great Britain	The ship was lost near Cádiz. She was on a voyage from Newfoundland to Cádiz.
Mary and Eliza	Great Britain	The ship was wrecked near St. Lucar. She was on a voyage from Nova Scotia, British America to St. Lucar.
Nelly	Great Britain	The ship was driven ashore and damaged at Liverpool, Lancashire. She was on a voyage from Jamaica to Liverpool. Nelly was later refloated.
New Jersey	United States	The ship was lost near St. Ubes, Portugal. Her crew were rescued. She was on a voyage from St. Ubes to New York.
Nottington	Great Britain	The ship struck rocks in the Isles of Scilly and was severely damaged with the loss of a crew member. She was on a voyage from Faro, Portugal to Rotterdam, Dutch Republic.
Province	France	The ship sprang a leak and foundered. Her crew were rescued. She was on a voyage from Gothenburg, Sweden to Havre de Grâce.
Salisbury 1781 ship (2)	Great Britain	The ship was lost near the Isle of Sheppey, Kent. Her crew were rescued. She was on a voyage from Gothenburg, Sweden to Livorno, Grand Duchy of Tuscany.
Sophia Fredrica	Hamburg	The ship was driven ashore near St. Lucar. She was on a voyage from Hamburg to Seville, Spain.
Snowden Hill	Great Britain	The ship was driven ashore in the Bristol Channel off Saint Tudwal's Islands. She was on a voyage from a Welsh port to Gibraltar.
Swift	Great Britain	The ship was driven ashore and severely damaged at Ramsgate. She was on a voyage from St. Ubes to Pool, Dorset.
Syren	Great Britain	The ship was driven ashore and wrecked near Beachy Head, Sussex. She was on a voyage from Jamaica to London.
Vrow Martha	Hamburg	The ship was abandoned in the Atlantic Ocean 70 leagues (210 nautical miles (390 km) west of the Isles of Scilly. Her crew were rescued by Elizabeth and Ann (Great Britain). Vrow Martha was on a voyage from Bordeaux, France to Hamburg.
William	Great Britain	The ship was lost on the French coast. She was on a voyage from Bristol, Gloucestershire to Saint-Malo, France.
William	Great Britain	The ship was lost at Milford Haven, Pembrokeshire. She was on a voyage from Cádiz to Bristol.
William	Great Britain	The ship was lost near Aberavon, Glamorgan. She was on a voyage from Bilbao, Spain to Bristol.

== February ==
=== 4 February ===
List of shipwrecks: 4 February 1789
Ship	State	Description
Juba	Great Britain	The ship was driven ashore on the coast of Ireland. She was on a voyage from New York, United States to Bristol, Gloucestershire.

=== 24 February ===
List of shipwrecks: 24 February 1789
Ship	State	Description
London	Great Britain	The ship was wrecked in the Isles of Scilly with the loss of fifteen of the sixteen people on board. She was on a voyage from Charleston, South Carolina, United States to London.

=== Unknown date ===
List of shipwrecks: Unknown date in February 1789
Ship	State	Description
Alexander	Great Britain	The ship was lost off São Miguel Island, Azores.
Betsey	Great Britain	The ship was wrecked on the Goodwin Sands, Kent with the loss of three of her crew. She was on a voyage from London to Cork, Ireland.
Christiana Septimus	(Denmark) Danish Asiatic Company	The East Indiaman was lost off Anholt. She was on a voyage from Copenhagen to the West Indies.
Diligent	Great Britain	The ship was driven ashore in Studwell Bay. She was on a voyage from Trapani, Sicily to Pool, Dorset.
Expéditif	France	The ship was lost on a voyage from L'Orient to Ostend, Dutch Republic.
Flora	Great Britain	The ship was abandoned off Marstrand, Sweden. She was on a voyage from London to Gothenburg and Marstrand.
Henry	Great Britain	The ship was driven ashore near Margate, Kent.
Jane	Great Britain	The ship was lost near Anglesey. She was on a voyage from Rouen, France to Liverpool, Lancashire.
La Diane	France	The ship was lost at Guernsey, Channel Islands with the loss of all but two of her crew. She was on a voyage from Dieppe to Guernsey.
London	Great Britain	The ship was lost at Ostend.
Margaret	Great Britain	The ship was lost at Madeira.
Mary	Great Britain	The ship was driven ashore and wrecked at Whitehaven, Cumberland.
Minerva	France	The ship ran aground on the Wicklow Banks, in the Irish Sea and sank. Her crew were rescued. She was on a voyage from Dublin, Ireland to Bordeaux.
Nancy	Ireland	The ship was driven ashore on the coast of Cornwall. She was on a voyage from Drogheda, County Louth to Portsmouth, Hampshire.
Olive Branch	Ireland	The ship foundered in the Atlantic Ocean off the west coast of Ireland. She was on a voyage from New York to Dublin.
Rainbow	Great Britain	The ship was lost at Madeira. She was on a voyage from Copenhagen to the West Indies.
Royal Tar	Great Britain	The ship was lost near Trepani, Sicily. she was on a voyage from Livorno, Grand Duchy of Tuscany to Newfoundland, British America.
Union	France	The ship was lost near Brest, France with the loss of all hands. She was on a voyage from Bordeaux to Boulogne.
William	Great Britain	The ship was lost at Madeira.

== March ==
=== 3 March ===
List of shipwrecks: 3 March 1789
Ship	State	Description
Hope	Great Britain	The ship was driven ashore and wrecked on St Martin's, Isles of Scilly.

=== 7 March ===
List of shipwrecks: 7 March 1789
Ship	State	Description
Hercules	Great Britain	The ship was destroyed by fire in the Atlantic Ocean. All on board were rescued by Esther (Great Britain). Hercules was on a voyage from London to Halifax, Nova Scotia, British America.

=== 22 March ===
List of shipwrecks: 22 March 1789
Ship	State	Description
Anna (Анна)	Imperial Russian Navy	The transport ship was driven ashore and capsized by ice on the Stanislav Spit in the Dnieper–Bug estuary.
Bogomater Turleni (Богоматерь Турлени, 'Panagia Tourliani')	Imperial Russian Navy	The transport ship was capsized by ice in the Dnieper–Bug estuary.
Esperants (Эсперанц, 'Espérance')	Imperial Russian Navy	The transport ship was driven ashore and capsized by ice on the Stanislav Spit in the Dnieper–Bug estuary.
Fedot Muchenik (Федот Мученик, 'Martyr Theodotus')	Imperial Russian Navy	The frigate was driven aground by ice in the Dnieper–Bug estuary. She was refloated on 4 April and taken in to Kherson. Subsequently repaired and returned to service.

=== 28 March ===
List of shipwrecks: 28 March 1789
Ship	State	Description
Alexander	Great Britain	The ship foundered in the Atlantic Ocean. She was on a voyage from Gibraltar to Charleston, South Carolina and New York, United States.
Chance	Great Britain	A tornado at Dixcove, Africa pushed the schooner on her side. Her crew survived. Twenty-two of the 33 slaves onboard did not.

=== 30 March ===
List of shipwrecks: 30 March 1789
Ship	State	Description
Vryheid	Dutch Republic	The ship was run down and sank in the English Channel 5 leagues (15 nautical miles (28 km)) off Beachy Head, Sussex, Great Britain by Lascelles ( British East India Company). Nine crew (of 11) survived. Vryheid was on a voyage from Cádiz, Spain to Amsterdam.

=== Unknown date ===
List of shipwrecks: Unknown date in March 1789
Ship	State	Description
Adventure	Great Britain	The ship was wrecked near South Shields, County Durham with the loss of all hands. She was on a voyage from London to South Shields.
Ann	Great Britain	The ship was lost in the Isles of Scilly. She was on a voyage from Newfoundland, British America to Vigo, Spain and Dartmouth, Devon.
Batchelor	Great Britain	The ship was lost off Liverpool, Lancashire with the loss of all on board. She was on a voyage from Sligo, Ireland to Liverpool.
Bona Fortuna	Flag unknown	The ship was wrecked at St. Ives, Cornwall, Great Britain.
Betsey	Great Britain	The brig was driven ashore in Wood-Bridge-Bay. Dominica.
Charles	Great Britain	The ship was driven ashore on the coast of Ireland. She was on a voyage from Bordeaux, France to Liverpool.
Elizabeth	Dutch Republic	The ship was lost near Fayal, Azores. She was on a voyage from Demerara to Amsterdam.
Expedition	Great Britain	The ship was driven ashore and wrecked at Walton-on-the-Naze, Essex. She was on a voyage from Ipswich, Suffolk to San Sebastián, Spain.
Johanna Sophia	Sweden	The ship was lost near Skagen, Denmark. She was on a voyage from Bordeaux to Guernsey, Channel Islands and Gothenburg.
John and Mary	Great Britain	The ship was driven ashore and wrecked on the north coast of Cornwall. She was on a voyage from Dingle, County Kerry, Ireland to Dartmouth.
Lydia	Great Britain	The ship foundered in the Irish Sea off Douglas, Isle of Man. She was on a voyage from Ireland to Lancaster, Lancashire.
Mary	Ireland	The ship was wrecked in Croisic Bay. She was on a voyage from Cork to Nantes, France.
Modesty	Great Britain	The ship was driven ashore in the River Dee. She was on a voyage from Newry, County Antrim, Ireland to Chester, Cheshire.
North Britton	Great Britain	The ship struck rocks in the Isles of Scilly and was severely damaged. She was on a voyage from Bristol, Gloucestershire to London.
Resolution	Great Britain	The ship was driven ashore near Cádiz, Spain.
Sally	Ireland	The ship was lost near Brest, France. She was on a voyage from Cork to Nantes.
Sarah	Ireland	The ship was lost at the mouth of the Garonne. She was on a voyage from Waterford to Bordeaux.
St. George	Great Britain	The ship was wrecked near Margate, Kent. She was on a voyage from London to Grenada.
Ste Françoise	France	The ship was lost whilst on a voyage from La Rochelle to Boulogne.
St. Joseph y Animas	Spain	The ship was lost near San Sebastián with the loss of four of her crew. She was on a voyage from Bilbao to Bristol.
Vrise Boor	Great Britain	The ship was wrecked off Mallorca, Spain. She was on a voyage from Saint Petersburg, Russia to Ancona, Papal States.
Vrow Gessina	Dutch Republic	The ship was lost near Fayal. She was on a voyage from Demerara to Amsterdam.

== April ==
=== 11 April ===
List of shipwrecks: 11 April 1789
Ship	State	Description
John	Great Britain	The ship was lost at Málaga, Spain. She was on a voyage from Smyrna, Ottoman Empire to London.

=== 24 April ===
List of shipwrecks: 24 April 1789
Ship	State	Description
Four Sisters	Great Britain	The ship was driven ashore at Elsinore, Denmark.
Humber	Great Britain	The ship was driven ashore at Elsinore. She was refloated.
Unity	Great Britain	The ship was driven ashore at Elsinore. She was refloated on 26 April.
Unity	Great Britain	The ship was driven ashore behind the "Kohl of Toreko", Sweden. She was on a voyage from Liverpool, Lancashire to Stettin. She was later refloated and taken in to Copenhagen, Denmark for repairs.

=== 30 April ===
List of shipwrecks: 30 April 1789
Ship	State	Description
Duke of Richmond	Great Britain	The ship foundered whilst on a voyage from Alicante, Spain to a Baltic port. Her crew were rescued.

=== Unknown date ===
List of shipwrecks: Unknown date in April 1789
Ship	State	Description
Charlotte	Great Britain	The ship was lost at "Memlmore", Denmark. Her crew were rescued.
Echo	Ireland	The ship was driven ashore at La Tremblade, France. She was on a voyage from Cork to Bordeaux, France. She was later refloated.
Godfrey	Great Britain	The ship was lost in the Kinmare River. She was on a voyage from Bristol, Gloucestershire to Tralee, County Kerry, Ireland.
Jane	Great Britain	The light collier was driven ashore 2 nautical miles (3.7 km) east of Nass Point, Glamorgan.
Mercury	Great Britain	The ship was lost in the Thames Estuary 16 nautical miles (30 km) downstream of Gravesend, Kent. She was on a voyage from Charleston, South Carolina, United States to London.
North Britol	Great Britain	The ship struck a sunken rock in the Isles of Scilly and was severely damaged. She was on a voyage from Wales to London.
Peggy	Great Britain	The ship was driven ashore near Boulogne, France. She was on a voyage from Chester, Cheshire to London.
Rainbow	Denmark	The ship foundered in the Atlantic Ocean off Madeira, Portugal.
Vine	Great Britain	The ship was driven ashore near Boulogne, France. She was on a voyage from St. Ubes, Portugal to Lübeck. She was later refloated and taken in to Boulogne.

== May ==
=== 26 May ===
List of shipwrecks: 26 May 1789
Ship	State	Description
Ann	Great Britain	The ship was wrecked at "Uld Nun". She was on a voyage from Liverpool, Lancashire to Guinea.

=== Unknown date ===
List of shipwrecks: Unknown date in May 1789
Ship	State	Description
Batavier	Dutch Republic	The ship was sunk by ice near Elsinore, Denmark.
Dorothy	Great Britain	The ship was wrecked by ice near the Kohl of Toreko, Sweden. She was on a voyage from Bordeaux, France to Karlskrona, Sweden.
Eagle	Great Britain	The ship ran aground in the Isles of Scilly. She was refloated.
Endeavour	Great Britain	The ship foundered in The Wash off King's Lynn, Norfolk.
Friendship	Great Britain	The ship was sunk by ice off Copenhagen, Denmark. She was on a voyage from Air to Memel, Prussia.
Sommer	Stettin	The ship foundered in the English Channel off The Lizard, Cornwall, Great Britain with the loss of all hands. She was on a voyage from Bordeaux to Stettin.

== June ==
=== 17 June ===
List of shipwrecks: 17 June 1789
Ship	State	Description
Friendship	Great Britain	The ship foundered in the Atlantic Ocean. She was on a voyage from Virginia, United States to Cádiz, Spain.

=== Unknown date ===
List of shipwrecks: Unknown date in June 1789
Ship	State	Description
Alexander	Denmark	The ship was lost on the Dutch coast. She was on a voyage from Copenhagen to Ostend, Dutch Republic.
Carrolus	Stettin	The ship was lost whilst on a voyage from London, Great Britain to Stettin.
Drie Gebroeders	Dutch Republic	The ship was wrecked near Ostend with the loss of all but one of her crew. She was on a voyage from Amsterdam to Dunkirk, France.
Frère Jean Jacques Ore	France	The ship was wrecked on the Île d'Oléron. Her crew were rescued. She was on a voyage from Saint-Domingue to Bordeaux.
Helespont	Prussia	The ship was lost near Danzig. She was on a voyage from Königsberg to the Strait of Gibraltar.
Little William	Great Britain	The ship was lost at L'Orient, France with the loss of all but one of her crew. She was on a voyage from Liverpool, Lancashire to Nantes, France.
Vreyheid	Dutch Republic	The ship was driven ashore at "Zexhar". She was on a voyage from Amsterdam to Saint Petersburg, Russia.

== July ==
=== 4 July ===
List of shipwrecks: 4 July 1789
Ship	State	Description
Shah Byram Gore	(Kingdom of Great Britain) India	The ship was wrecked at Bombay.

=== 11 July ===
List of shipwrecks: 11 July 1789
Ship	State	Description
Prince of Piedmont	Kingdom of Sardinia	The ship caught fire, exploded and sank at Ostend, Dutch Republic with the loss of two lives. She was carrying a cargo of Saltpetre.

=== 28 July ===
List of shipwrecks: 28 July 1789
Ship	State	Description
Delfin (Дельфин, 'Dolphin')	Imperial Russian Navy	Russo-Swedish War: The cutter was driven ashore and wrecked on Bornholm, Denmark. Her crew were rescued.

=== 29 July ===
List of shipwrecks: 29 July 1789
Ship	State	Description
Bombay	British East India Company	The East Indiaman was destroyed by fire at Bombay.

=== Unknown date ===
List of shipwrecks: Unknown date in July 1789
Ship	State	Description
Elizabeth	Great Britain	The ship was driven ashore at Liverpool, Lancashire. She was on a voyage from Jamaica to Liverpool.
Jonge Everts	Great Britain	The ship was wrecked on the Dutch coast. She was on a voyage from Whitby, Yorkshire, Great Britain to Amsterdam.
Minerva	Great Britain	The ship was drovem ashore at Ostend, Dutch Republic. She was on a voyage from Virginia, United States to Dunkirk, France. Minerva was refloated on 3 August.
Orford	Great Britain	The ship was driven ashore at Swinemünde, Swedish Pomerania. She was on a voyage from Liverpool, Lancashire to Stettin.
Solo Dade	Portugal	The ship was lost at Viana do Castelo. She was on a voyage from Viana do Castelo to Rio de Janeiro, Brazil.
13 unnamed vessels	Sweden	The ships were wrecked near Norrköping.

== August ==
=== 8 August ===
List of shipwrecks: 8 August 1789
Ship	State	Description
Johannes	Sweden	The ship was driven ashore near "Tiswelde", Denmark. She was on a voyage from Fredrikshall to Aalborg, Denmark.
St. Blas	Spain	The ship was driven ashore near Helsingborg, Sweden. she was on a voyage from Saint Petersburg, Russia to Málaga. St. Blas was later refloated.

=== 24 August ===
List of shipwrecks: 24 August 1789
Ship	State	Description
Vansittart	British East India Company	The East Indiaman was driven ashore at Bangka, Dutch East Indies, where she was burnt by the Malays. Vansittart was on a voyage from London to China.
William and Thomas	Great Britain	The ship was lost in the Currituck Sound. She was on a voyage from London to Gibraltar and Maryland, United States.
Five unnamed vessels	Imperial Russian Navy	Russo-Swedish War, Battle of Svensksund: Three galleys, a galiot and a xebec were sunk in the battle.
Five unnmed vessels	Swedish Navy	Russo-Swedish War, Battle of Svensksund: Three galleys and two frigates were sunk in the battle.

=== Unknown date ===
List of shipwrecks: Unknown date in August 1789
Ship	State	Description
Elizabeth	Great Britain	The sloop foundered.
Endeavour	Great Britain	The brig was driven ashore and wrecked near Bridport, Dorset. Her crew were rescued. She was on a voyage from Sidmouth, Devon to Newcastle upon Tyne, Northumberland.
Jane	Great Britain	The ship ran aground on the Domesnes Reef. She was on a voyage from Riga, Russia to Amsterdam, North Holland, Dutch Republic.
John	Great Britain	The ship ran aground on the Burbo Bank, in Liverpool Bay and was severely damaged. She was on a voyage from Liverpool, Lancashire to Jamaica.
John and Margaret	Great Britain	The ship was lost on North Sand Head with the loss of her captain.
Jonge	Lübeck	The ship caught fire and sank in the Baltic Sea. Her crew were rescued. She was on a voyage from Riga, Russia to Lübeck.
Snap Dragon	Great Britain	The ship sprang a leak and foundered in the Baltic Sea between Bornholm, Denmark and Falsterbo, Sweden. Her crew were rescued by a Bremen ship. She was on a voyage from Saint Petersburg, Russia to Bristol, Gloucestershire.
Unnamed	Portugal	The ship was lost in the Baltic Sea.
Unnamed	Hamburg	The ship was lost in the Baltic Sea.
Three unnamed vessels	Flags unknown	The ships ran aground in the Swine Bottom.
Unnamed	Spain	The ship was driven ashore at Rade. She was on a voyage from Málaga to Saint Petersburgh.
Unnamed	Flag unknown	The galiot was driven ashore at Rade.

== September ==
=== 8 September ===
List of shipwrecks: 8 September 1789
Ship	State	Description
Severny Oryol (Северный Орёл, 'Northern Eagle')	Imperial Russian Navy	Russo-Swedish War: The ship of the line ran aground in sv:Barösund Strait in the Gulf of Finland. Her crew were rescued. She had become a wreck by 13 September. Another source gives the date as 6 September.

=== 9 September ===
List of shipwrecks: 9 September 1789
Ship	State	Description
Nostra Señora Del Rosario	Spain	The ship was driven ashore in Cádiz Bay.
Port Packet	Great Britain	The ship was driven ashore in Cádiz Bay. She was later refloated.
Sacra Familia	Spain	The ship was driven ashore in Cádiz Bay.

=== 13 September ===
List of shipwrecks: 13 September 1789
Ship	State	Description
Oka (Ока)	Imperial Russian Navy	Russo-Swedish War: The galley was wrecked on ru:Pukkionsaari Island in the Gulf of Finland.
Vesyolaya (Весёлая, 'Cheerful')	Imperial Russian Navy	Russo-Swedish War: The galley was wrecked on Pukkionsaari Island in the Gulf of Finland.

=== 18 September ===
List of shipwrecks: 18 September 1789
Ship	State	Description
Russell	Great Britain	The ship foundered in the Baltic Sea off Bornholm, Denmark.

=== 19 September ===
List of shipwrecks: 19 September 1789
Ship	State	Description
Lowther	Great Britain	The ship capsized in the Atlantic Ocean. Her crew were rescued. She was on a voyage from Philadelphia, Pennsylvania, United States to Jamaica.

=== 24 September ===
List of shipwrecks: 24 September 1789
Ship	State	Description
William	Great Britain	The brig sprang a leak and was abandoned in the Atlantic Ocean (35°04′N 66°00′W). Her crew were rescued by Robinson (Ireland). William was on a voyage from Glasgow, Renfrewshire to North Carolina, United States.

=== 29 September ===
List of shipwrecks: 29 September 1789
Ship	State	Description
Bombay	India	The grab was destroyed by fire at Bombay.
Enterprize	Great Britain	The ship was abandoned off Cape Sable Island, Nova Scotia, British America. She was on a voyage from Pool, Dorset to Portsmouth, New Hampshire, United States.

=== 30 September ===
List of shipwrecks: 30 September 1789
Ship	State	Description
Enterprise	Great Britain	The ship foundered in the Sable Bank whilst on a voyage from Poole, Dorset to Portsmouth, New Hampshire, United States.
Hope	Great Britain	The brig was driven ashore and wrecked between Rye, Sussex and Lydd, Kent with the loss of seven of her crew and a rescuer.

=== Unknown date ===
List of shipwrecks: Unknown date in September 1789
Ship	State	Description
Ann	Great Britain	The ship was driven ashore on the Sandwich Flats. She was on a voyage from London to Seville, Spain. She was later refloated and taken in to Ramsgate, Kent.
Benjamin	Great Britain	The ship was driven ashore and damaged. She was on a voyage from Saint Petersburg, Russia to Livorno, Grand Duchy of Tuscany. She was later refloated and taken in to Helsingør, Denmark.
Concordia	Hamburg	The ship foundered in the North Sea off the coast of Holland. She was on a voyage from Nantes, France to Hamburg.
Espoir	France	The ship was driven ashore in the Garonne. She was on a voyage from Saint-Domingue to Bordeaux.
Fly	Great Britain	The ship sank in the New Passage with the loss of a crew member. She was on a voyage from Ulverston, Lancashire to Newnham, Gloucestershire.
Hope	Great Britain	The ship was driven ashore near Lydd, Kent and was wrecked with the loss of seven of her crew. She was on a voyage from Jamaica to London.
John	Great Britain	The ship foundered in the Baltic Sea off Gotland, Sweden. She was on a voyage from Stockholm, Sweden to Marseille, France.
Lancaster	Great Britain	The ship foundered in the Baltic Sea off Kronstadt, Russia. She was on a voyage from Saint Petersburg, Russia to Lancaster, Lancashire.
Liebling	Sweden	The ship foundered in the North Sea off Great Yarmouth, Norfolk, Great Britain whilst on a voyage from Stockholm to Nantes, France.
Mary Ann	Great Britain	The ship was lost off The Rosses, County Donegal, Ireland. She was on a voyage from Liverpool, Lancashire to Galway.
Nereus	Great Britain	The ship was driven ashore in the Thames Estuary downstream of Gravesend, Kent. She was on a voyage from Saint Petersburg to London.
Pellican	Great Britain	The ship was driven ashore and wrecked in the River Thames at Limehouse, Middlesex. She was on a voyage from Saint Petersburg to London.
Sisters	Great Britain	The ship was wrecked near Gothenburg, Sweden. She was on a voyage from Leith, Lothian to Saint Petersburg.
Young William	Great Britain	The ship was driven ashore near Margate, Kent. She was on a voyage from Jamaica to London.

== October ==
=== 1 October ===
List of shipwrecks: 1 October 1789
Ship	State	Description
Susannah	Great Britain	The ship foundered in Ayr Bay with the loss of all hands.

=== 8 October ===
List of shipwrecks: 8 October 1789
Ship	State	Description
Hector	Ireland	The ship was lost at Cobh, County Cork. She was on a voyage from Cobh to Antigua.

=== 12 October ===
List of shipwrecks: 12 October 1789
Ship	State	Description
Darling	Great Britain	The brigantine foundered in the North Sea off Great Yarmouth, Norfolk with the loss of two of her twelve crew. Survivors were rescued by a herring boat. She was on a voyage from North Shields, Northumberland to London.
Enterprize	Great Britain	The ship departed from Newfoundland, British America for Southampton, Hampshire. No further trace, presumed foundered in the Atlantic Ocean with the loss of all hands.
Verow Tenderlena	Dutch Republic	The galiot-hoy was driven ashore at Rottingdean, Sussex, Great Britain whilst on a voyage from Havre de Grâce to Bordeaux, France. Her crew were rescued.

=== 13 October ===
List of shipwrecks: 13 October 1789
Ship	State	Description
Count de Jumilhae	France	The ship foundered off Cádiz, Spain.

=== 15 October ===
List of shipwrecks: 15 October 1789
Ship	State	Description
Rodislav (Родислав)	Imperial Russian Navy	Russo-Swedish War: The ship of the line ran aground at Naissaar. Her crew were rescued. She sank on 24 October. She was returning to Reval from sv:Barösund as squadron flagship.

=== 20 October ===
List of shipwrecks: 20 October 1789
Ship	State	Description
Vysheslav (Вышеслав)	Imperial Russian Navy	Russo-Swedish War: The ship of the line ran aground at Rodsher Island. She was on a voyage from Reval to Kronstadt. Her crew were rescued by merchant ships on 23 October and she was set afire to prevent capture by the Swedes.

=== 22 October ===
List of shipwrecks: 22 October 1789
Ship	State	Description
Unnamed	Great Britain	The sloop was wrecked at Atherfield, Isle of Wight, Great Britain. She was on a voyage from Rouen to Brest.

=== 30 October ===
List of shipwrecks: 30 October 1789
Ship	State	Description
Active	Great Britain	The ship was driven ashore and wrecked at King's Lynn, Norfolk.
Beg-Brook or Log-Book	Great Britain	The ship was driven ashore and wrecked at Great Yarmouth, Norfolk.
Borrowdale	Great Britain	The full-rigged ship foundered in the North Sea off Great Yarmouth with the loss of all but one of her crew.
Catherine	Great Britain	The ship was driven ashore and wrecked near Great Yarmouth.
Catherine and Maria	Great Britain	The ship was driven ashore and wrecked at King's Lynn.
Constant Friends	Great Britain	The ship was driven ashore and wrecked at Great Yarmouth. Her crew were rescued.
Dispatch	Great Britain	The ship was driven ashore and scuttled at King's Lynn. She was later refloated and taken in to King's Lynn.
Dixon	Great Britain	The ship was driven ashore at King's Lynn.
Flora	Great Britain	The ship was driven ashore and wrecked at Great Yarmouth with the loss of three of her crew.
Fortune	Great Britain	The ship was driven ashore and wrecked at Great Yarmouth.
Friendship	Great Britain	Captain Lowther's ship was driven ashore at Great Yarmouth with the loss of all but one of her crew.
Friendship	Great Britain	Captain Garland's ship foundered in The Wash off King's Lynn, or was driven ashore at King's Lynn.
Friendship	Great Britain	Captain Waldon's ship foundered in The Wash off King's Lynn, or was driven ashore at King's Lynn.
Georges	Great Britain	The ship was driven ashore and wrecked at Great Yarmouth with the loss of all hands.
Generous Friend	Great Britain	The ship was reported missing after the storm.
Hannibal	Great Britain	The ship was driven ashore and wrecked at Lowestoft, Suffolk. Her crew were rescued.
Isis	Great Britain	The ship was driven ashore and wrecked at Great Yarmouth. Her crew were rescued.
James	Great Britain	The ship was driven ashore at Great Yarmouth.
James	Great Britain	The ship was driven ashore at King's Lynn.
James & George	Great Britain	The ship was driven ashore at Great Yarmouth.
James and Margaret	Great Britain	The ship was driven ashore and wrecked at Great Yarmouth.
Jane & Sarah	Great Britain	The ship was driven ashore at Great Yarmouth.
John	Great Britain	Captain Shepherd's ship was driven ashore and wrecked at Great Yarmouth with the loss of all hands. She was on a voyage from Bordeaux, France to North Shields, Northumberland.
John	Great Britain	Captain Bell's ship was driven ashore and wrecked at Great Yarmouth with the loss of all hands.
John & Catherine	Great Britain	The ship was driven ashore at Great Yarmouth with the loss of all hands. She was later refloated and taken in to Great Yarmouth.
Joseph and Elizabeth	Great Britain	The ship foundered in the North Sea off Great Yarmouth. There were eight survivors.
Joseph and George	Great Britain	The ship was driven ashore at Great Yarmouth. Her crew were rescued.
Kitty	Great Britain	The ship was driven ashore at Great Yarmouth. Her crew were rescued.
Lark	Great Britain	The ship was driven ashore at Great Yarmouth. Her crew were rescued.
Laurel	Great Britain	The ship was driven ashore at Great Yarmouth.
Margaret	Great Britain	The ship was driven ashore near Walmer Castle, Kent. She was on a voyage from Veere, Dutch Republic to Maryland, United States. Margaret was later refloated and taken in to Ramsgate, Kent for repairs.
Maria	Great Britain	The ship was driven ashore at Great Yarmouth. She was on a voyage from Great Yarmouth to Rotterdam, Dutch Republic. Maria was later refloated and taken in to Great Yarmouth.
Maria	Great Britain	The ship was reported missing after the storm.
Mary	Great Britain	The ship was driven ashore and severely damaged on the coast of Norfolk. She was later refloated and taken in to Great Yarmouth.
Mediator	Great Britain	The ship was driven ashore at King's Lynn.
Neptune	Great Britain	Captain Breame's ship was driven ashore at Great Yarmouth.
Neptune	Great Britain	Captain Taylor's ship was driven ashore at Great Yarmouth.
Neptune	Great Britain	Captain Mearsey's ship was driven ashore and wrecked at King's Lynn, or foundered in The Wash off King's Lynn.
New Moon	Great Britain	The ship struck the pier and sank at Dover, Kent. She was on a voyage from Nantes, France to Stettin.
Nightingale	Great Britain	The ship foundered in the North Sea off Great Yarmouth with the loss of six of her crew.
Northumberland	Great Britain	The ship was driven ashore and wrecked at Great Yarmouth. Her crew were rescued.
Peggy	Great Britain	The ship was driven ashore and wrecked at Great Yarmouth. Her crew were either lost, or rescued.
Perseverance	Great Britain	The ship foundered in The Wash off King's Lynn. Her crew were rescued.
Polly	Great Britain	The ship was lost off the coast of Norfolk with the loss of all hands.
Pomona	Great Britain	The ship was lost in the Delaware River.
Preston	Great Britain	The ship was driven ashore at Great Yarmouth.
Prior	Great Britain	The ship was driven ashore at Great Yarmouth. She was later refloated and taken in to Great Yarmouth.
Providence	Great Britain	The ship was driven ashore and wrecked at Great Yarmouth with the loss of all hands.
Prudence	Great Britain	The ship was driven ashore at Great Yarmouth.
Ranger	Great Britain	The ship was driven ashore at Great Yarmouth. Her crew were rescued.
Robert's Adventure	Great Britain	The ship was driven ashore and wrecked at Great Yarmouth with the loss of all hands.
Samuel	Great Britain	The ship was driven ashore at Great Yarmouth. She was later refloated and taken in to Great Yarmouth.
Samuel & Ann	Great Britain	The ship was driven ashore at Great Yarmouth.
Samuel and Elizabeth	Great Britain	The ship was driven ashore at Great Yarmouth off Great Yarmouth.
Success	Great Britain	The ship was driven ashore at Great Yarmouth. Her crew were rescued.
Sudis	Great Britain	The ship was driven ashore and wrecked at Great Yarmouth with the loss of all hands.
Teasdale	Great Britain	The ship was driven ashore at Great Yarmouth.
Thornhill	Great Britain	The ship was driven ashore and wrecked at Great Yarmouth. Her crew were rescued.
Trusty	Great Britain	The ship was driven ashore at Great Yarmouth.
Unity	Great Britain	The ship was driven ashore at Great Yarmouth. She subsequently became a wreck.
Van	Great Britain	The ship was driven ashore at Great Yarmouth. She was later refloated and taken in to Great Yarmouth.
Windsor	Great Britain	The ship was driven ashore and wrecked at Great Yarmouth. There were seven survivors.
Westmoreland	Great Britain	The ship was driven ashore and wrecked at Great Yarmouth.
William & James	Great Britain	The ship was driven ashore at Great Yarmouth. She was later refloated and taken in to Great Yarmouth.
William & Francis	Great Britain	The ship was driven ashore at Great Yarmouth. She subsequently became a wreck.
Windsor	Great Britain	The ship was driven ashore at Great Yarmouth.
Unnamed	Great Britain	The pilot boat was driven ashore at Spurn Point, Yorkshire with the loss of all three crew.

=== 31 October ===
List of shipwrecks: 31 October 1789
Ship	State	Description
Felicity	Great Britain	The ship was driven ashore and wrecked at Margate, Kent.

=== Unknown date ===
List of shipwrecks: Unknown date in October 1789
Ship	State	Description
Active	Great Britain	The ship ran aground on the Gunfleet Sand, in the North Sea off the coast of Essex.
Alteration	Great Britain	The ship was destroyed by fire off Texel, Dutch Republic. Her crew were rescued. She was on a voyage from Arkhangelsk, Russia to Bordeaux, France.
Caroline	Great Britain	The ship was wrecked at Cape Mount, Africa.
Castle	Great Britain	The ship was driven ashore at Kioge, Denmark. She was on a voyage from Narva, Russia to Hull, Yorkshire.
Darling	Great Britain	The ship was driven ashore on the coast of Suffolk. She was on a voyage from South Shields, County Durham to London.
Diana	Great Britain	The ship was driven ashore and severely damaged on the coast of Denmark. She was on a voyage from Saint Petersburg, Russia to Hull, Yorkshire.
Experiment	Great Britain	The ship was wrecked on the Goodwin Sands, Kent. Her crew were rescued. She was on a voyage from Newcastle upon Tyne, Northumberland to Rouen, France.
Friendship	Great Britain	The ship was driven ashore at Ramsgate, Kent. She was on a voyage from London to Algiers.
Hamburg	Great Britain	The ship was driven ashore on the Isle of Man whilst on a voyage from Liverpool, Lancashire to Philadelphia, Pennsylvania, United States. Her crew were rescued.
Hope	Great Britain	The ship was driven ashore at Castrup, Denmark. She was on a voyage from Memel, Prussia to London.
Industry	Great Britain	The ship was wrecked on the Dutch coast. Her crew were rescued.
Joanna Maria	Hamburg	The ship was driven ashore near Ostend, Dutch Republic. She was on a voyage from Hamburg to Rouen.
Jufrow Gezina	Dutch Republic	The ship departed from Königsberg, Prussia for Amsterdam. No further trace, presumed foundered with the loss of all hands.
Marechal de Mailly	France	The ship foundered in the Bay of Biscay. She was on a voyage from Cette to Saint Petersburg.
Maria Dorothea	Stettin	The ship was driven ashore at Skagen, Denmark. She was on a voyage from London to Stettin.
Minerva	Great Britain	The ship was driven ashore at Douglas, Isle of Man and was wrecked. She was on a voyage from Liverpool to Philadelphia, Pennsylvania, or a port in Georgia, United States.
Neptune	Great Britain	The ship was driven ashore at Holyhead, Anglesey.
Norwich	Great Britain	The ship was wrecked on the Dutch coast. She was on a voyage from Libava, Duchy of Courland and Semigallia to a Dutch port.
Peggy	Great Britain	The ship foundered in the Baltic Sea off Bornholm, Denmark.

== November ==
=== 7 November ===
List of shipwrecks: 7 November 1789
Ship	State	Description
Countess of Galloway	Great Britain	The ship was lost near Guernsey, Channel Islands.

=== 12 November ===
List of shipwrecks: 12 November 1789
Ship	State	Description
Dundee	Great Britain	The ship foundered in the Baltic Sea off Gotland, Sweden. Her crew were rescued. She was on a voyage from Saint Petersburg, Russia to Dundee, Perthshire.

=== Unknown date ===
List of shipwrecks: Unknown date in November 1789
Ship	State	Description
Ann	Great Britain	The ship was driven ashore on Texel, Dutch Republic. She was later refloated.
Aurora	France	The ship was lost off Barmouth, Caernarfonshire, Great Britain. She was on a voyage from Saint-Domingue to Havre de Grâce.
Betsey	Great Britain	The ship was driven ashore at Ostend, Dutch Republic.
Bon Harmonie	Great Britain	The ship was wrecked in the Shetland Islands. She was on a voyage from Danzig to Liverpool, Lancashire.
Christina	Hamburg	The ship was driven ashore near Ostend.
Dublin	Ireland	The ship foundered in the Irish Sea off Kidwelly, Carmarthenshire, Great Britain. She was on a voyage from Dublin to Bristol, Gloucestershire, Great Britain.
Friendship	Great Britain	The ship foundered in the Bristol Channel. She was on a voyage from Swansea, Glamorgan to Barnstaple, Devon.
Hanibal	Great Britain	The ship was wrecked at Great Yarmouth, Norfolk. She was on a voyage from London to South Shields, County Durham.
Harpooner	Great Britain	The ship was driven ashore and wrecked at Cherbourg, France.
Humber	Great Britain	The ship was wrecked on the Dragør Reef.
Indian Chief	Great Britain	The ship capsized in the River Thames. She was on a voyage from London to Newcastle upon Tyne, Northumberland.
Isis	Great Britain	The ship ran aground in the Gulf of Finland off Reval, Russia. She was on a voyage from Saint Petersburg to Russia. She was refloated and taken in to Reval for repairs.
Jane	Great Britain	The ship was driven ashore in Cardigan Bay with the loss of six of her crew. She was on a voyage from British Honduras to Bristol, Gloucestershire.
Juno	Great Britain	The ship was driven ashore near Workington, Cumberland. She was on a voyage from Memel, Prussia to Whitehaven, Cumberland.
Levant	Great Britain	The ship was driven ashore in Bootle Bay. She was on a voyage from Philadelphia, Pennsylvania, United States to Liverpool. She was later refloated and taken in to Liverpool.
Liberty	Great Britain	The ship was driven ashore in St. Ives Bay. She was on a voyage from Tingmouth, Devon to Liverpool.
Louisa	Great Britain	The ship was driven ashore at Hoylake, Cheshire. She was on a voyage from Londonderry, Ireland to Liverpool.
Lowther	Great Britain	The ship foundered in the Irish Sea off Waterford, Ireland with the loss of all but one of her crew. The survivor was rescued by John and Joseph (Great Britain). Lowther was on a voyage from Whitehaven to Dublin.
Madona del Rosario e St. Giovanni Battista	Republic of Venice	The ship was destroyed by fire in the Corfu Channel. She was on a voyage from Salonica to Trieste.
Mary	Great Britain	The ship was driven ashore and wrecked at Beachy Head, Sussex. She was on a voyage from Liverpool to Dunkerque, France.
Nymph	Great Britain	The ship was driven ashore and wrecked at Barnegat, New Jersey, United States. She was on a voyage from Porto, Portugal to New York, United States.
Septimo	Great Britain	The ship was driven ashore at St. Lucar, Spain.
Staphorst	Great Britain	The ship was driven ashore at Texel.
Vreede & Endraght	Dutch Republic	The ship lost at Bilbao, Spain. She was on a voyage from Bilbao to Amsterdam.

== December ==
=== 5 December ===
List of shipwrecks: 5 December 1789
Ship	State	Description
John	Great Britain	The ship was driven ashore near Philadelphia, Pennsylvania, United States. She was on a voyage from the West Indies to Philadelphia.

=== 15 December ===
List of shipwrecks: 15 December 1789
Ship	State	Description
Anna Maria	(Kingdom of Great Britain) Isle of Man	The ship was driven ashore and wrecked near Ayr Great Britain. Her crew were rescued.
Elizabeth Fair	Great Britain	The ship was driven ashore and wrecked near Ayr. Her crew were rescued.
Fair Helen	Ireland	The ship was driven ashore and wrecked near Ayr. Her crew were rescued.
Fair Helen of Rutland	Great Britain	The brig was driven onto rocks near Turnberry, Ayrshire and was wrecked. Her crew were rescued.
Hopewell	Great Britain	The brig was driven ashore and wrecked near Ayr. Her crew were rescued.
Mary	Great Britain	The brig was driven ashore and wrecked at Turnberry with the loss of all hands.
Mary Ann	Great Britain	The ship was driven ashore and wrecked near Ayr. Her crew were rescued.
Nelson	Great Britain	The brig was driven onto rocks near Turnberry and was wrecked. Her crew were rescued.
Neptune	Great Britain	The brig was driven ashore and wrecked at Turnberry with the loss of all hands.
Peggy	Great Britain	The brig was driven ashore and wrecked near Ayr. Her crew were rescued.
Sincerity	Great Britain	The brig was driven ashore and wrecked at Turnberry with the loss of five of her seven crew.
Sully	Great Britain	The brig was driven ashore and wrecked near Ayr. Her crew were rescued.
Six unnamed vessels	Great Britain	A brig and five sloops were driven ashore and wrecked at Turnberry.

=== 21 December ===
List of shipwrecks: 21 December 1789
Ship	State	Description
Sarah	Great Britain	The ship foundered off Møn, Denmark. Her crew were rescued. She was on a voyage from Memel, Prussia to Lisbon, Portugal.

=== 24 December ===
List of shipwrecks: 24 December 1789
Ship	State	Description
HMS Guardian	(Kingdom of Great Britain)	HMS Guardian. The Roebuck-class ship was in collision with an iceberg in the Southern Ocean (44°S 41°E) and was severely damaged. Two hundred and fifty-nine of the 321 people on board abandoned ship. HMS Guardian was taken in to Saldanha Bay, where she would be wrecked on 12 April 1790.

=== Unknown date ===
List of shipwrecks: Unknown date in December 1789
Ship	State	Description
Ben	Great Britain	The ship was driven ashore near Boulogne, France. She was on a voyage from Hull, Yorkshire to Jamaica.
Bien Aime	France	The ship was wrecked on the Dutch coast with the loss of a crew member. She was on a voyage from Havre de Grâce to Dunkirk.
British King	Great Britain	The ship sank at Dover, Kent. She was on a voyage from London to Seville, Spain.
Broad Oak	Great Britain	The ship was lost on Beggars Patch, in Liverpool Bay. She was on a voyage from Liverpool, Lancashire to Great Yarmouth, Norfolk.
Carmen Victoria	Portugal	The ship was driven ashore at Falsterbo, Sweden. She was on a voyage from Saint Petersburg, Russia to Lisbon.
Elizabeth	Great Britain	The ship was driven ashore and wrecked at Ramsgate, Kent. She was on a voyage from London to Havre de Grâce, France.
Fame	Great Britain	The ship was driven ashore at Holyhead, Anglesey. She was on a voyage from Barcelona, Spain to Liverpool.
Fly	Great Britain	The ship was wrecked on The Martyrs whilst on a voyage from Jamaica to Africa.
Fortuna	Stettin	The ship was lost whilst on a voyage from Amsterdam, Dutch Republic to Stettin.
Friendship	Great Britain	The ship was driven ashorne near Livorno, Grand Duchy of Tuscany.
George	Great Britain	The ship capsized in the River Suir, Ireland.
Good-Intent	Great Britain	The ship was driven ashore near Flamborough Head, Yorkshire.
Hero	Great Britain	The ship capsized at North Shields, Northumberland. She was on a voyage from London to North Shields and Grenada.
Hope	Great Britain	The ship was driven ashore at "Lazaire", France. She was on a voyage from Liverpool to Nantes, France.
Jemima	Great Britain	The ship was driven ashore and severely damaged near Dieppe, France. She was later refloated and taken in to Ramsgate, Kent. Jemima was on a voyage from Barcelona to Calais, France.
Kerlaw	Great Britain	The ship foundered off A Coruña, Spain. She was on a voyage from Liverpool to Marseille, France.
Lady Edgcombe	Great Britain	The ship was driven ashore near Plymouth, Devon. She was on a voyage from Plymouth to Tingmouth, Devon.
Leverpool	Great Britain	The ship was driven ashore near Plymouth.
Mary	Great Britain	The ship was lost on Beggars Patch. She was on a voyage from Londonderry, Ireland to Chester, Cheshire.
Minerva	(Kingdom of Great Britain) Guernsey	The ship was lost at the mouth of the Ebro. She was on a voyage from Tarragona, Spain to Guernsey.
Nancy & Jean	Great Britain	The ship was driven ashore in Carnarvon Bay. She was on a voyage from São Miguel Island, Azores to Liverpool.
Prince Charles	Great Britain	The ship was lost on the Dutch coast. She was on a voyage from Memel, Prussia to Cádiz, Spain.
Releif	Great Britain	The ship was driven ashore near Boulogne. She was on a voyage from Portsmouth, Hampshire to London.
Ringende Jacob	Stettin	The ship was lost on the coast of Norway. She was on a voyage from Stettin to London.
Russel	Great Britain	The ship was lost near Cape Wrath, Caithness with the loss of all but one of her crew. She was on a voyage from Stockholm, Sweden to Dublin, Ireland.
Sally	Great Britain	The ship was lost off Anglesey. She was on a voyage from Neath, Glamorgan to Liverpool.
St. Antonio	Portugal	The ship was driven ashore and wrecked on Terceira Island, Azores. She was on a voyage from India to Lisbon.
Sunderland	Great Britain	The ship foundered in The Deeps, off the coast of Essex. Her crew were rescued. She was on a voyage from Sunderland, County Durham to London.
Vrow Martha	Dutch Republic	The ship capsized in the English Channel off Guernsey, Channel Islands.
Welcome	Great Britain	The ship was lost near Danzig. Her crew were rescued.

== Unknown date ==
List of shipwrecks: Unknown date in 1789
Ship	State	Description
Admiral Suffrein	Dutch East India Company	The East Indiaman was lost on the Hynam Coast with the loss of a passenger. She was on a voyage from China to Amsterdam.
Adventure	Great Britain	The ship foundered in the Atlantic Ocean. Her crew were rescued by Jupiter (Great Britain). Adventure was on a voyage from Maryland, United States to London.
Ansdel	Great Britain	The whaler was lost off the coast of Greenland.
Betty	Great Britain	The whaler was lost off the coat of Greenland.
Bonne Mère	France	The ship was lost on Watlant Island, Bahamas. She was on a voyage from Port-au-Prince, Saint-Domingue to France.
Charlotte	Great Britain	The ship was driven ashore at Cape Charles, Virginia, United States. She was on a voyage from Grenada to Virginia. She was later refloated and taken in to Alexandria, Virginia, United States.
Drietal Handelaars	Dutch East India Company	The East Indiaman was wrecked in False Bay. She was on a voyage from Batavia, Dutch East Indies to Amsterdam.
Elizabeth	Great Britain	The ship was abandoned in the Atlantic Ocean. Presumed to have subsequently foundered. She was on a voyage from Virginia, United States to London.
Endeavour	Great Britain	The whaler was lost off the coast of Greenland.
Fanny	Great Britain	The brig foundered in the Atlantic Ocean. She was on a voyage from Gambia to Dominica.
Favourite Lass	Great Britain	The ship was lost whilst on a voyage from Baltimore, Maryland to Barbados.
Friendship	Great Britain	The ship was lost in the Gulf of Florida. She was on a voyage from Jamaica to London.
Friendship	Great Britain	The ship was lost in the Grand Banks of Newfoundland.
Grampus	Great Britain	The whaler was lost off the coast of Greenland.
Hazard	Great Britain	The ship was lost off Cape Florida, New Spain. Her crew were rescued. She was on a voyage from British Honduras to London.
Hero	Great Britain	The ship was driven ashore and wrecked on the coast of Africa.
Indian	Dutch East India Company	The ship was lost in the Bengal River. She was on a voyage from Ostend to Madras, India.
Jane	Great Britain	The ship was lost before 14 April. Her crew were rescued.
Jane	Great Britain	The ship was run down and sunk in the Atlantic Ocean off the coast of Newfoundland, British America. Her crew were rescued.
Jane and Dianna	Great Britain	The ship was lost near the Virginia Capes, United States. She was on a voyage from Virginia to Spain.
John	Great Britain	The ship foundered in the Atlantic Ocean. Her crew were rescued by Mary (Great Britain). John was on a voyage from Newfoundland to Spain.
Jonge	Dutch Republic	The ship caught fire and sank in the Baltic Sea. Her crew were rescued.
Kitty & Alice	Great Britain	The ship was lost near Cape Henry, Virginia. She was on a voyage from Jamaica to Virginia.
Le La Touche	France	The ship was driven ashore on the "Bank of Macaw". She was on a voyage from Saint-Domingue to Bordeaux.
Lucania	Great Britain	The ship was lost at Manilla, Philippines.
Mary and Ann	Great Britain	The ship was driven ashore and wrecked on Plum Island, Massachusetts, United States. She was on a voyage from London to Boston, Massachusetts.
Minerva	Ireland	The whaler was lost off the coast of Greenland.
Molly	France	The ship was driven ashore near Cape Hatteras, North Carolina, United States. She was on a voyage from Dunkirk to Virginia.
Neptune	Great Britain	The ship was wrecked on Saint John, Virgin Islands before 26 May.
Philippa	Great Britain	The whaler was lost off the coast of Greenland.
Sally	Great Britain	The ship foundered in the Atlantic Ocean off New York, United States.
St Joseph	Great Britain	The ship was lost at Newfoundland.
Snap Dragon	Great Britain	The ship foundered off Trettenburg whilst on a voyage from Saint Petersburg, Russia to Bristol, Gloucestershire. Her crew were rescued by a ship from Bremen.
Sv. Pavel	Russian Empire	During a voyage from Okhotsk in the Russian Empire to Kenai Bay (now Cook Inlet on the south-central coast of Russian Alaska, the vessel was wrecked in the Bering Sea near the Pribilof Islands without loss of life or cargo.
Triumvirate	Great Britain	The ship sank at St George's Quay, British Honduras.
Wilkes	Great Britain	The ship was lost near the Dardanelles. She was on a voyage from Alexandria, Egypt to Constantinople, Ottoman Empire.
William	Great Britain	The ship was lost whilst on a voyage from Greenock, Renfrewshire to North Carolina.
