= Malos =

Malos may refer to:

- Milos, an island of Greece
- Malos (Galatia), a town of ancient Galatia, now in Turkey
- Malos (Phrygia), a town of ancient Phrygia, now in Turkey
- Malos (Pisidia), a town of ancient Pisidia, now in Turkey
