= Mallus =

Mallus may refer to:

- Mallus (Cilicia), an ancient city in Cilicia, Anatolia
- Mallus (Pisidia), an ancient city in Pisidia, Anatolia
- Mallus (Legends of Tomorrow), a mysterious entity in the American superhero television series
- Marco Mallus (born 1982), Italian footballer

== Other uses ==
- Crates of Mallus, Greek grammarian and philosopher
- Miletus mallus, a butterfly in the family Lycaenidae

== See also ==
- Malus (disambiguation)
