= Malus (disambiguation) =

Malus, the apples, is a genus of about 30–35 species of small deciduous trees or shrubs in the family Rosaceae, including most importantly the domesticated Orchard or Table Apple.

Malus may also refer to:

- Malus (Galatia), a town of ancient Galatia, now in Turkey
- Malus (Phrygia), a town of ancient Phrygia, now in Turkey
- Malus (Pisidia), a town of ancient Pisidia, now in Turkey
- Bonus–malus, a scheme of reward and punishment
- Malus (constellation), an asterism that was part of the constellation Argo Navis
- Étienne-Louis Malus (1775–1812), French officer, engineer, physicist, and mathematician
- Malus's law for a polarizer
- Malus (Castlevania), a young boy who is the reincarnation of Dracula in the video games Castlevania and Castlevania: Legacy of Darkness
- Malus (EP), a 2022 EP by the South Korean boy band Oneus
- Edward Malus, played by Nicolas Cage, the protagonist of The Wicker Man
- Karl Malus, M.D., a fictional villain from Marvel Comics
- The Malus, a monster appearing in the Doctor Who story "The Awakening"
- The Malus, a playable race in the computer game O.R.B: Off-World Resource Base
- Malus, the sixteenth and final Colossus in Shadow of the Colossus
- Malus, in Greek mythology, the consort of the muse Erato
