= List of shipwrecks in 1790 =

The List of shipwrecks in 1790 includes ships sunk, foundered, wrecked, grounded or otherwise lost during 1790.

table of contents
1790
Jan	Feb	Mar	Apr
May	Jun	Jul	Aug
Sep	Oct	Nov	Dec
Unknown date

== January ==
=== 22 January ===
List of shipwrecks: 22 January 1790
Ship	State	Description
Good Design	Great Britain	The ship was driven ashore near Scarborough, Yorkshire. Her crew were rescued. She was later refloated and taken in to Scarborough for repairs.

=== 23 January ===
List of shipwrecks: 23 January 1790
Ship	State	Description
HMS Bounty	(Kingdom of Great Britain) Royal Navy	Mutiny on the Bounty: The 4-gun full-rigged ship was burnt in Bounty Bay, off Pitcairn Island.

=== 24 January ===
List of shipwrecks: 24 January 1790
Ship	State	Description
Julie	France	The ship was wrecked on Faial Island, Azores.

=== 27 January ===
List of shipwrecks: 27 January 1790
Ship	State	Description
Endeavour	Great Britain	The ship was wrecked in the Outer Hebrides while on a voyage from New York, United States to Belfast, County Down, Ireland.

=== Unknown date ===
List of shipwrecks: Unknown date in January 1790
Ship	State	Description
Amos Patrie	Great Britain	The ship was lost on the coast of Norway. She was on a voyage from Arkhangelsk, Russia to Amsterdam, North Holland, Dutch Republic.
Ann	Great Britain	The ship was driven ashore on the coast of Sweden. She was on a voyage from St. Ubes, Portugal to Gothenburg, Sweden.
Carlton	Great Britain	The ship was driven ashore at Dungeness, Kent. She was refloated but capsized going in to Dover, Kent and was abandoned by her crew. Carlton subsequently came ashore at Sandgate, Kent. She was on a voyage from New York, United States to London.
Commercial Treaty	Great Britain	The ship foundered in the English Channel 3 leagues (7.8 nmi; 14 km) off Saint-Valery-sur-Somme, France. She was on a voyage from London to Saint-Valery-sur-Somme.
Eagle	Great Britain	The collier sank on the Gunfleet Sand, in the North Sea off the coast of Essex. Her crew were rescued.
Elizabeth	Great Britain	The ship was driven ashore near Ostend, West Flanders, Dutch Republic. She was on a voyage from London to Ostend.
Francis	Great Britain	The ship was wrecked on the Gunfleet Sand. She was on a voyage from South Shields to London.
Hope	Great Britain	The ship was lost off the Dutch coast. She was on a voyage from Quebec, British America to London.
Jane	Great Britain	The ship was driven ashore near Wexford, Ireland. She was on a voyage from Woodbridge, Suffolk to Liverpool, Lancashire.
Jonge Juffrow Johanna	Dutch Republic	The ship was lost at Cádiz, Spain. She was on a voyage from Amsterdam, North Holland to Málaga, Spain.
Judith	Great Britain	The ship was driven ashore near Beachy Head, Sussex. She was on a voyage from Dublin, Ireland to London.
Lavater	Bremen	The ship was lost on the North Sand Head, off Ramsgate, Kent. She was on a voyage from Bremen to Bordeaux, France.
Le Telemaque	France	The brig ran aground and sank in the Seine at Quillebeuf-sur-Seine. The wreck was salvaged in July 1842.
Liberty	Great Britain	The ship was driven ashore at Great Yarmouth, Norfolk. She was on a voyage from Newcastle upon Tyne, Northumberland to Plymouth, Devon. Liberty was later refloated.
Lively	Great Britain	The ship was lost on the coast of Portugal with the loss of four of her crew. She was on a voyage from Newfoundland, British America to Figueira da Foz, Portugal.
Maria Lucia	France	The ship was driven ashore in Bigbury Bay. Her crew were rescued.
Mary	Great Britain	The ship was lost on the coast of Jutland. She was on a voyage from Gothenburg to London.
Nancy	Great Britain	The ship was lost on the coast of France. She was on a voyage from Charleston, South Carolina, United States to Bordeaux.
Neptune	Great Britain	The ship was driven ashore at Hoylake, Cheshire. She was on a voyage from London to Liverpool.
Nimble	Great Britain	The whaler was driven ashore near Leigh-on-Sea, Essex. She was on a voyage from London to the South Seas. She was later refloated and taken in to Gravesend, Kent.
Peggy	Great Britain	The ship foundered in the Irish Sea while of a voyage from Ulverston, Lancashire to Preston, Lancashire.
Pitt	Great Britain	The ship ran aground on the Gunfleet Sand.
Polly	Great Britain	The ship was driven ashore and wrecked in Carnarvon Bay. She was on a voyage from Cork, Ireland to Liverpool.
Weymouth	Great Britain	The ship was in collision with another vessel in the River Thames and sank. She was on a voyage from London to Weymouth, Dorset.
William and John	Great Britain	The ship was driven ashore in Chale Bay. Her crew were rescued. She was on a voyage from Liverpool to Rotterdam, South Holland, Dutch Republic. She was refloated in March and taken in to Cowes, Isle of Wight.
Young Samuel	Great Britain	The ship was lost on the Gunfleet Sand. She was on a voyage from South Shields, County Durham to London.

== February ==
=== 5 February ===
List of shipwrecks: 5 February 1790
Ship	State	Description
America	United States	The ship foundered in the Atlantic Ocean (41°40′N 41°30′W). Her crew were rescued by Alfred (United States). America was on a voyage from the Sheep Cut River to L'Orient, France.

=== Unknown date ===
List of shipwrecks: Unknown date in February 1790
Ship	State	Description
Aurora	France	The ship was driven ashore near Havre de Grâce. She was on a voyage from Saint Petersburg, Russia to Rouen.
Belle Henriette	France	The ship was lost whilst on a voyage from Rouen to Stockholm, Sweden.
Commerce	Great Britain	The ship was driven ashore at Ostend, West Flanders, Dutch Republic. She was on a voyage from Maryland, United States to Ostend. Commerce was refloated and taken into port but was declared beyond repair.
John	Great Britain	The ship foundered in the Atlantic Ocean off Land's End, Cornwall. Her crew were rescued. She was on a voyage from St. Ubes, Portugal to Gothenburg, Sweden.
Providence	Great Britain	The ship was driven ashore on the Hook Sands, in the English Channel off the coast of Dorset. She was on a voyage from Liverpool to Pool, Dorset. She was later refloated and taken in to Pool.
Reward	Great Britain	The ship was wrecked near Texel, North Holland, Dutch Republic. She was on a voyage from Maryland, United States to Rotterdam, South Holland, Dutch Republic.
Success	Ireland	The ship was lost on the Tail of the Kish. Her crew were rescued. She was on a voyage from Porto, Portugal to Dublin.

== March ==
=== 8 March ===
List of shipwrecks: 8 March 1790
Ship	State	Description
Keppel	Great Britain	The ship was lost at Skagen, Denmark. Her crew were rescued. She was on a voyage from London to Memel, Prussia.

=== 19 March ===
List of shipwrecks: 19 March 1790
Ship	State	Description
HMS Sirius	(Kingdom of Great Britain) Royal Navy	HMS Sirius. The 10-gun ship-of-the-line was driven onto a reef off Norfolk Island and was wrecked.

=== 24 March ===
List of shipwrecks: 24 March 1790
Ship	State	Description
Hindostan	British East India Company	The East Indiaman was destroyed by fire off the Malabar Coast. She was on a voyage from Canton, China to Bombay, India.

=== 31 March ===
List of shipwrecks: 31 March 1790
Ship	State	Description
Minerva	Great Britain	The ship was wrecked at Wexford, Ireland. She was on a voyage from London to Greenock, Renfrewshire.

=== Unknown date ===
List of shipwrecks: Unknown date in March 1790
Ship	State	Description
Adventure	Great Britain	The ship was wrecked on the Île d'Yeu, Vendée, France. She was on a voyage from London to the Charente.
Mercury	Great Britain	The ship struck a rock in the Strait of Gibraltar and sank.
Privy Counsellor Gaher	Hamburg	The ship was lost off Cádiz, Spain. She was on a voyage from Hamburg to Cádiz.
Twin Brothers	Great Britain	The ship was driven ashore at Dungarvan, County Waterford, Ireland. She was on a voyage from Bristol, Gloucestershire to Cork, Ireland.

== April ==
=== 7 April ===
List of shipwrecks: 7 April 1790
Ship	State	Description
Lewis	Great Britain	The ship was destroyed by fire at Passage East, County Waterford, Ireland. She was on a voyage from London to Waterford, Ireland and Newfoundland, British America.

=== 10 April ===
List of shipwrecks: 10 April 1790
Ship	State	Description
Resignation	Great Britain	The brig was driven ashore and sank at Great Yarmouth, Norfolk. She was on a voyage from Rotterdam, South Holland, Dutch Republic to Great Yarmouth.

=== 12 April ===
List of shipwrecks: 12 April 1790
Ship	State	Description
Aurora	Great Britain	The whaler was driven ashore at the Cape of Good Hope. She was later refloated.
Bridgewater	Great Britain	The ship was driven ashore on the coast of Sweden.
Ecclair	France	The ship was lost at the Cape of Good Hope.
E. P. Augustenbourg	(Denmark) Danish Asiatic Company	The ship was driven ashore at the Cape of Good Hope.
HMS Guardian	(Kingdom of Great Britain) Royal Navy	The Roebuck-class fifth-rate ship-of-the-line was driven ashore and wrecked on the coast of the Cape Colony between Table Bay and Saldanha Bay.
Helena Louisa	Dutch East India Company	The brig was driven ashore at the Cape of Good Hope.
La Desia	France	The ship was driven ashore at the Cape of Good Hope.
Le Maria Genoise	(Kingdom of France) French East India Company	The ship was driven ashore at the Cape of Good Hope.
Maria	Dutch East India Company	The ship was driven ashore and wrecked at the cape of Good Hope.

=== 20 April ===
List of shipwrecks: 20 April 1790
Ship	State	Description
Count Conway	Great Britain	The ship was lost at the Cape of Good Hope.
William and Mary	Great Britain	The ship was sunk by ice off the coast of Newfoundland, British America. Her crew were rescued. She was on a voyage from Dartmouth, Devon to Newfoundland.

=== Unknown date ===
List of shipwrecks: Unknown date in April 1790
Ship	State	Description
Dispatch	Great Britain	The ship was wrecked on Ameland, Friesland, Dutch Republic. She was on a voyage from Gothenburg, Sweden to Tobago.
Grampus	Great Britain	The ship was lost at Barcelona, Spain. She was on a voyage from Virginia, United States to Barcelona.
Iron Sides	Great Britain	The ship was lost with all hands whilst on a voyage from Plymouth, Devon to Neath, Glamorgan.
Jonge Pieter	Dutch Republic	The ship was lost near North Foreland, Kent, Great Britain.
Nancy	Great Britain	The ship was driven ashore at Beaumaris, Anglesey.
Olive Branch	Great Britain	The ship was lost near Riga, Russia with the loss of three of her crew. She was on a voyage from Riga to Hull, Yorkshire.
St. Anthony	Dutch Republic	The ship was lost near North Foreland.
Stormont	Great Britain	The ship foundered in the Atlantic Ocean off the Isles of Scilly. Her crew were rescued. She was on a voyage from Cette, Hérault, France to Guernsey, Channel Islands.
William and Ann	Great Britain	The sloop foundered in the English Channel. All on board were rescued by HMS Southampton (Royal Navy). William and Ann was on a voyage from Plymouth, Devon to Guernsey.
Zephir	Great Britain	The ship was driven ashore and severely damaged at Cherbourg, France. She was on a voyage from London to Cardiff, Glamorgan.

== May ==
=== 11 May ===
List of shipwrecks: 11 May 1790
Ship	State	Description
Alarm	Ireland	The ship was wrecked in Cádiz Bay. She was on a voyage from Cork to Gibraltar.
Blessing	Ireland	The ship was driven ashore in Cádiz Bay. She was on a voyage from Cork to Gibraltar.

=== 24 May ===
List of shipwrecks: 24 May 1790
Ship	State	Description
Khvat (Хват, 'Grasp')	Imperial Russian Navy	The transport ship struck a submerged object and sank off Reval.

=== Unknown date ===
List of shipwrecks: Unknown date in May 1790
Ship	State	Description
Active	(Kingdom of Great Britain) Isle of Man	The ship was wrecked on the "Isle of Ache" while on a voyage from Douglas to Glasgow, Renfrewshire, Great Britain. Her crew were rescued.
Benediction	Great Britain	The ship foundered in the North Sea with the loss of all hands.
Christopher	Great Britain	The ship foundered whilst on a voyage from London to Alicante, Spain. Her crew were rescued.
Elizabeth and Ann	Great Britain	The ship foundered. Her crew were rescued by Royal Tar (Great Britain). Elizabeth and Ann was on a voyage from Lisbon, Portugal to Saint Petersburg, Russia.
General Goddard	British East India Company	The East Indiaman was driven ashore on the south coast of the Isle of Wight. She was on a voyage from Bengal, India to London. She was later refloated and escorted in to Portsmouth, Hampshire by HMS Hebe ( (Kingdom of Great Britain) Royal Navy).
Nelly and Ann	Great Britain	The ship was run down and sunk by a Dutch galiot 4 leagues (12 nautical miles (22 km) south of Skagen, Denmark. She was on a voyage from Leith, Lothian to Aalborg, Denmark.
Viper		The ship was lost in the British Cameroons.

== June ==
=== 19 June ===
List of shipwrecks: 19 June 1790
Ship	State	Description
Alexander	Great Britain	The ship was driven ashore in the River Foyle.
Triton	Great Britain	The ship was wrecked on the Hogsty Reef. Her crew were rescued. She was on a voyage from Jamaica to Lancaster, Lancashire.

=== 22 June ===
List of shipwrecks: 22 June 1790
Ship	State	Description
HSwMS Drottning Lovisa Ulrika	Royal Swedish Navy	Russo-Swedish War, Battle of Vyborg Bay: The ship of the line ran aground in Vyborg Bay and was captured by the Russians.
HSwMS Finland	Royal Swedish Navy	Russo-Swedish War, Battle of Vyborg Bay: The ship of the line ran aground in Vyborg Bay and was captured by the Russians.
HSwMS Hedvig Elisabet Charlotta	Royal Swedish Navy	Russo-Swedish War, Battle of Vyborg Bay: The ship of the line ran aground and sank in Vyborg Bay.
HSwMS Jarislawiz (Yaroslavets (Ярославец))	Royal Swedish Navy	Russo-Swedish War, Battle of Vyborg Bay: The frigate (captured from Russia in 1788) ran aground in Vyborg Bay and was captured by the Russians.
HSwMS Ömheten	Royal Swedish Navy	Russo-Swedish War, Battle of Vyborg Bay: The ship of the line ran aground in Vyborg Bay and was captured by the Russians.
HSwMS Postiljonen	Royal Swedish Navy	Russo-Swedish War, Battle of Vyborg Bay: The fireship was expended in battle.
HSwMS Uppland	Royal Swedish Navy	Russo-Swedish War, Battle of Vyborg Bay: The frigate ran aground in Vyborg Bay and was captured by the Russians.

=== Unknown date ===
List of shipwrecks: Unknown date in June 1790
Ship	State	Description
Ann and Francis	Ireland	The ship was lost whilst on a voyage from Waterford to Liverpool, Lancashire, Great Britain.
Brothers	Great Britain	The ship was wrecked on the coast of Jutland. She was on a voyage from Gallipoli, Ottoman Empire to Stettin.
Eagle	Great Britain	The ship was lost in the Isles of Scilly. Her crew were rescued. She was on a voyage from Charleston, South Carolina, United States to Falmouth, Cornwall.
Elizabeth	Great Britain	The ship was lost in the Isles of Scilly. She was on a voyage from Alicante, Spain to a Baltic port.
Kent	Great Britain	The whaler was driven ashore and wrecked on the south coast of the Isle of Wight. She was on a voyage from London to the South Seas.
Norval	Great Britain	The ship ran aground on the Trinnel. She was on a voyage from St. Ubes, Portugal to Memel, Prussia. She was refloated.
Unity	Great Britain	The ship rang aground on the Swinn Bottoms, off the coast of Sweden. She was on a voyage from Memel, Prussia to London. She was later refloated and taken in to Copenhagen, Denmark for repairs.

== July ==
=== 2 July ===
List of shipwrecks: 2 July 1790
Ship	State	Description
Adventure	Great Britain	The yacht ran aground in the River Thames at Chelsea, Middlesex.
Nelly & Nancy	Great Britain	The ship was wrecked on Barbuda. Her crew were rescued. She was on a voyage from North Carolina, United States to Guadeloupe.

=== 9 July ===
List of shipwrecks: 9 July 1790
Ship	State	Description
Aleksandr (Александр, 'Alexander')	Imperial Russian Navy	Russo-Swedish War, Battle of Svensksund: The Aleksandr-class frigate ran aground and was lost in the battle. 46 of her 250 crew survived.
Konstantin (Константин, 'Constantine')	Imperial Russian Navy	Russo-Swedish War, Battle of Svensksund: The Aleksandr-class frigate ran agroud and was lost in the battle. 4 of her 250 crew survived.
Lynx	Great Britain	The ship was lost near the Laun Islands. She was on a voyage from Newfoundland to Cape Breton Island, British America.
Mariya (Мария, 'Maria')	Imperial Russian Navy	Russo-Swedish War, Battle of Svensksund: The Aleksandr-class frigate was grounded in surrender, and after a few hours capsized and sank in the Gulf of Finland. 70 of her 250 crew survived.
Nikolay (Николай, 'Nicholas')	Imperial Russian Navy	Russo-Swedish War, Battle of Svensksund: The Aleksandr-class frigate frigate sunk in the Gulf of Finland off Kotka, Old Finland. 12 of her 250 crew survived. The wreck was found in 1948.
Yekaterina (Екатерина, 'Catherine')	Imperial Russian Navy	Russo-Swedish War, Battle of Svensksund: The Aleksandr-class frigate, flagship of the Russian fleet, ran aground in the battle and was burnt by her crew. 84 of her 250 crew survived.
52 unnamed vessels	Imperial Russian Navy	Russo-Swedish war, Battle of Svensksund: The ships, including 6 rowing frigates, (Note: Presumably including the five Russian frigates also listed for this date.) 5 xebecs, 2 floating batteries, and 16 galleys, were lost in battle.

=== 20 July ===
List of shipwrecks: 20 July 1790
Ship	State	Description
Orange Field	Great Britain	The brig was wrecked at Portpatrick, Wigtownshire while on a voyage from Cork, Ireland to Greenock, Renfrewshire. Her five crew survived.

=== 24 July ===
List of shipwrecks: 24 July 1790
Ship	State	Description
Columbas	Great Britain	The ship was destroyed by fire at Bluefields, Jamaica. She was on a voyage from Jamaica to Leith, Lothian.

=== Unknown date ===
List of shipwrecks: Unknown date in July 1790
Ship	State	Description
Chance	Ireland	The ship was driven ashore and wrecked at Clevedon, Somerset, Great Britain. Her crew were rescued. She was on a voyage from Kinsale, County Cork to Bristol, Gloucestershire, Great Britain.
Dragon	Great Britain	The ship was driven ashore near Swinemünde, Prussia.
Fox	Great Britain	The sloop was wrecked near Kilkadrane Point towards the end of July. All on board were rescued.
Miriam	Great Britain	The ship sank in the River Thames. She was on a voyage from London to New Brunswick, British America.
Nayda	France	The ship was lost whilst on a voyage from Riga, Russia to Bordeaux.
Willington	Great Britain	The ship was lost whilst on a voyage from St. Ubes, Portugal to a Baltic port.
Woodhouse	Great Britain	The ship foundered in The Swin, off the coast of Essex. She was on a voyage from Pillaw, Prussia to London.

== August ==
=== 6 August ===
List of shipwrecks: 9 August 1790
Ship	State	Description
Good Intent	Great Britain	The brig ran aground on the Kentish Knock and was damaged. She was on a voyage from Sunderland, County Durham, to Portsmouth, Hampshire. She was refloated and taken in to Lowestoft, Suffolk.

=== 9 August ===
List of shipwrecks: 9 August 1790
Ship	State	Description
HSwMS Sophia Ulrica	Swedish Navy	The 64-gun Man-of-War capsized and sank in the Baltic Sea off "Winga" with the loss of about 400 lives. There were about 100 survivors.

=== 9 August ===
List of shipwrecks: 22 August 1790
Ship	State	Description
HMS Endymion	Royal Navy	The Roebuck-class ship struck a rock in the Windward Passage and sank. Her crew were rescued by the schooner New Hope (Flag unknown).

=== Unknown date ===
List of shipwrecks: Unknown date in August 1790
Ship	State	Description
Abby	Great Britain	The ship was lost in the Gulf of Florida.
Clyde	Great Britain	The ship was wrecked on the North Bull, in the Irish Sea off the cooast of County Dublin, Ireland.
Economy	Great Britain	The collier foundered in the North Sea off Margate, Kent at the end of August.
Einigkeit	Sweden	The ship was lost near "Geroe".
Mercurius	Stettin	The ship was lost at Anholt.
Prudence	Great Britain	The ship was lost at Cape Caloucha, Spain. Her crew were rescued. she was on a voyage from Jamaica to London.
St. Anna and St. Jeza	Portugal	The ship was wrecked near Stratton, Cornwall, Great Britain. She was on a voyage from Lisbon to Saint Petersburg, Russia.
Thetis	Great Britain	The ship was lost in the Gulf of Florida.
Wilmington	Great Britain	The ship was wrecked at Liverpool, Lancashire. She was on a voyage from Danzig to Liverpool.

== September ==
=== 1 September ===
List of shipwrecks: 1 September 1790
Ship	State	Description
Friendship	Great Britain	The ship was driven ashore and wrecked in a hurricane at Jamaica.
London	Great Britain	The ship was driven ashore and wrecked in a hurricane at Jamaica.
Miss Parker	Great Britain	The ship was driven ashore and wrecked in a hurricane at Jamaica.
Peerless	Great Britain	The ship was run down and sunk in the Atlantic Ocean (43°N 13°W) by a Danish brig. Her crew were rescued. She was on a voyage from Lancaster, Lancashire to the West Indies.

=== 9 September ===
List of shipwrecks: 9 September 1790
Ship	State	Description
Blacket	Great Britain	The ship ran aground on the Scroby Sands, in the North Sea off the coast of Norfolk. She was on a voyage from Onega, Russia to London. Blacket was later refloated and taken in to Great Yarmouth, Norfolk.
Peggy	Great Britain	The ship sank in the River Dee. She was on a voyage from Saint Petersburg, Russia to Chester, Cheshire.

=== 13 September ===
List of shipwrecks: 13 September 1790
Ship	State	Description
Dispatch	Great Britain	The ship foundered in the Atlantic Ocean while on a voyage from Fogo, Newfoundland, British North America to Porto, Portugal.

=== 19 September ===
List of shipwrecks: 19 September 1790
Ship	State	Description
Carlisle	Great Britain	The ship was wrecked on the Isle of Lewis, Outer Hebrides. She was on a voyage from Gothenburg, Sweden to Liverpool, Lancashire.

=== 21 September ===
List of shipwrecks: 21 September 1790
Ship	State	Description
Duke of York	Great Britain	The brig foundered off Liverpool, Lancashire. Her crew were rescued. She was on a voyage from Teignmouth, Devon to Liverpool.
Mary	Great Britain	The ship ran aground on the Hoyle Bank, in Liverpool Bay. She was on a voyage from Liverpool to a port in Africa. She was refloated with assistance, and put back to Liverpool on 27 September.

=== 24 September ===
List of shipwrecks: Unknown date in September 1790
Ship	State	Description
Dronning Juliana Maria	Danish Asiatic Company	Dronning Juliana Maria The Chinaman capsized in the North China Sea.

=== Unknown date ===
List of shipwrecks: Unknown date in September 1790
Ship	State	Description
Alexander	Great Britain	The ship was driven ashore at Walney Island, Lancashire.
HMS Arethusa	(Kingdom of Great Britain) Royal Navy	The Minerva-class frigate ran aground on rocks off Brest, Finistère, France. She was refloated but found to be severely damaged. Subsequently repaired and returned to service.
Duke of York	Great Britain	The ship sank at Liverpool, Lancashire. She was on a voyage from Teignmouth, Devon to Liverpool.
Irene	Great Britain	The ship was wrecked at Anholt, Denmark. She was on a voyage from Memel, Prussia to London.
Mary	Great Britain	The ship was driven ashore and severely damaged at Hoylake, Cheshire. She was on a voyage from Liverpool to Africa.
Pitt	Great Britain	The ship ran aground at Dover, Kent. She was on a voyage from London to Lisbon, Portugal.
Rebecca	Great Britain	The ship was driven ashore at Boulogne, Pas-de-Calais, France. She was on a voyage from Virginia, United States to London.
HMS Robust	(Kingdom of Great Britain) Royal Navy	The Ramillies-class ship of the line ran aground on the Horse of Wilmington sandbank, in the English Channel 2 leagues (5.2 nmi; 9.7 km) south east by south of Beachy Head, Sussex. She was subsequently repaired and returned to service.
William	Great Britain	The sloop foundered off Start Point, Devon. Her crew survived. She was on a voyage from Plymouth to Dartmouth, Devon.

== October ==
=== 1 October ===
List of shipwrecks: 1 October 1790
Ship	State	Description
Tri Sviatitelia	Russian Empire	The vessel was wrecked in Kashega Harbor (53°28′50″N 167°10′30″W) on the coast of Unalaska Island in the Catherine Archipelago during a storm.

=== 8 October ===
List of shipwrecks: 8 October 1790
Ship	State	Description
Unnamed	Flag unknown	The ship foundered in the Atlantic Ocean. She was on a voyage from Saint Croix, Virgin Islands to Copenhagen, Denmark.

=== 12 October ===
List of shipwrecks: 12 October 1790
Ship	State	Description
William and Margaret	Great Britain	The brigantine was wrecked on Oronsay with the loss of three of her crew. She was on a voyage from Trondheim, Norway to Strangford Lough, Ireland.

=== 14 October ===
List of shipwrecks: 14 October 1790
Ship	State	Description
Nostra Señora de la Conception	Spain	The ship was abandoned in the Gulf of Mexico (24°30′N 84°00′W) while on a voyage from Truxillo to Trinidad.

=== 16 October ===
List of shipwrecks: 16 October 1790
Ship	State	Description
Hunter	Great Britain	The ship foundered in Temple Bay.

=== 25 October ===
List of shipwrecks: 25 October 1790
Ship	State	Description
Concord	Great Britain	The ship departed from Quebec for Guernsey, Channel Islands. No further trace, presumed foundered with the loss of all hands.

=== Unknown date ===
List of shipwrecks: Unknown date in October 1790
Ship	State	Description
Ajax	Great Britain	The ship was lost in the Gulf of Finland. She was on a voyage from Nantes, Loire-Inférieure, France to Saint Petersburg, Russia.
Compte d'Agay	France	The ship sank at Brest, Finistère. She was on a voyage from Saint Petersburg to Brest.
Concord	Portugal	The ship was driven ashore at Lowestoft, Suffolk, Great Britain. She was on a voyage from Saint Petersburg to Lisbon.
Diligence	Great Britain	The ship was lost whilst on a voyage from Saint Petersburg to London.
Dublin	Ireland	The ship foundered in the Baltic Sea 3 leagues (9 nautical miles (17 km)) off Gotland, Sweden. Her crew were rescued by a Swedish vessel. She was on a voyage from Stockholm, Sweden to Dublin.
Elephant	Great Britain	The ship was lost on the Swine Bottoms, in the Baltic Sea off the coast of Sweden. Five of her crew drowned. She was on a voyage from Greenock, Renfrewshire to Memel, Prussia.
Endeavour	Ireland	The ship foundered in Ramsey Bay, Isle of Man. She was on a voyage from Norway to Dublin.
Generous Friends	Great Britain	The ship was lost in the White Sea.
George	Great Britain	The ship was lost at Arkhangelsk, Russia with the loss of all but one of her crew. She was on a voyage from Arkhangelsk to Falmouth, Cornwall.
Hector	Great Britain	The ship was lost at Harrington, Cumberland.
Hope	Great Britain	The ship was lost near St. Lucar, Spain. She was on a voyage from Portsmouth, Hampshire to Málaga.
La Pierre de Brevendent	Dutch Republic	The ship ran aground on the Goodwin Sands, Kent, Great Britain She was on a voyage from Ostend, West Flanders to Bayonne, Pyrénées-Atlantiques, France. She was refloated and taken in to Ramsgate, Kent.
Le Tout des Santes	France	The ship foundered off Candia, Crete, Greece. She was on a voyage from Livorno, Grand Duchy of Tuscany to Alexandria, Egypt.
Margaret	Great Britain	The ship was driven ashore in Runney Bay. She was on a voyage from Liverpool, Lancashire to Newry, County Antrim, Ireland.
Neutrality	Great Britain	The ship was driven ashore at Orfordness, Suffolk and was wrecked. She was on a voyage from Saint Petersburg to London.
Nostra Señora Del Carmen	Spain	The ship ran aground on the Goodwin Sands, Kent, Great Britain and was abandoned by her crew. She was on a voyage from Saint Petersburg to Barcelona.
Rosário de Maria	Portugal	The ship was wrecked at Reval, Russia while on a voyage from St. Ubes to Saint Petersburgh.
Santissimo Trinidada	Spain	The ship was wrecked at Ballykelly Point, County Down, Ireland. She was on a voyage from Málaga to Belfast, County Antrim.
William and Mary	Great Britain	The ship was lost in the Gulf of Finland. She was on a voyage from London to Saint Petersburg.

== November ==
=== 4 November ===
List of shipwrecks: 4 November 1790
Ship	State	Description
La Concorde	France	The ship was driven ashore and wrecked at Corton, Suffolk, Great Britain. All on board were rescued. She was on a voyage from Saint Petersburg, Russia to Lisbon, Portugal.
Unnamed	Great Britain	The fishing smack was driven ashore at Lowestoft, Suffolk with the loss of a crew member.

=== 10 November ===
List of shipwrecks: 10 November 1790
Ship	State	Description
Huron	France	The brig ran aground off Bermuda. She was on a voyage from Port-au-Prince, Saint-Domingue to Bayonne, Pyrénees-Atlantiques. She was later refloated and taken in to Bermuda ofr repairs.

=== 13 November ===
List of shipwrecks: 13 November 1790
Ship	State	Description
Prudence	Great Britain	The brig foundered in the Irish Sea 5 nautical miles (9.3 km) off Howth, County Dublin, Ireland while on a voyage from Whitehaven, Lancashire to Dublin. All but one of her crew were lost.

=== 22 November ===
List of shipwrecks: 22 November 1790
Ship	State	Description
HMRC Nimble	Great Britain	The cutter ran aground on the Harrow Bank. She was refloated the next day.

=== 26 November ===
List of shipwrecks: 26 November 1790
Ship	State	Description
Mary	Ireland	The Galway hooker was lost off "Robert's Cove" with the loss of all five people on board.

=== Unknown date ===
List of shipwrecks: Unknown date in November 1790
Ship	State	Description
Apollo	Great Britain	The ship was lost in Robin Hoods Bay. She was on a voyage from Saint Petersburg, Russia to Hull, Yorkshire.
Betsey	Great Britain	The ship struck the pier at Dover, Kent and damaged her stern. She put into Ramsgate where she sank. Betsey was on a voyage from London to Air, Scotland.
Carolina	Stettin	The ship was driven ashore on the Dutch coast. She was on a voyage from Stettin to Bordeaux, France.
Concordia Elizabeth	Danzig	The ship was wrecked on the coast of Jutland. She was on a voyage from Danzig to Dunkerque, Nord, France.
Delaware	Great Britain	The ship was lost in the White Sea. She was on a voyage from Arkhangelsk, Russia to Hull, Yorkshire.
Delight	Great Britain	The ship was driven ashore and wrecked north of Rattray Head, Aberdeenshire. She was on a voyage from Saint Petersburg to Liverpool, Lancashire.
Dolphin	Great Britain	The ship was in collision with another vessel in the River Thames and was beached near Blackwall, Middlesex. She was on a voyage from Saint Petersburg to London.
Elizabeth & Mary	Great Britain	The ship was driven ashore on Stormay, Outer Hebrides. She was on a voyage from Narva, Russia to Liverpool.
Experiment	Great Britain	The ship was lost near Memel, Prussia. She was on a voyage from Memel to Liverpool.
Fly	Great Britain	The ship was driven ashore near Boulogne, France. She was on a voyage from Newfoundland, British America to London.
Francis	Great Britain	The ship was lost near Holyhead, Anglesey. She was on a voyage from Youghal, County Cork, Ireland to Liverpool.
Gainsborough	Great Britain	The ship was driven ashore at Dagerort, Russia.
Hope	Great Britain	The ship was lost in the Orkney Islands with the loss of eight of her crew. She was on a voyage from Liverpool to Newcastle upon Tyne, Northumberland.
Humber	Great Britain	The ship was lost at Riga, Russia. She was on a voyage from Liverpool to Riga.
Jane	Great Britain	The ship was driven ashore and wrecked at Harwich, Essex. She was on a voyage from Dunkerque to London.
Jeune Antoine	France	The ship foundered in the Baltic Sea while on a voyage from Saint Petersburg to Belfast, County Down, Ireland.
Johannes	(Denmark) Norway	The ship was driven ashore near "Snowrig". She was on a voyage from London to Norway.
La Grâce	France	The ship was lost near Dunkerque, Nord. She was on a voyage from Cádiz, Spain to Ostend, West Flanders, Dutch Republic.
Perseverance	Great Britain	The ship was wrecked on the West Barrows Sand, in the North Sea off the coast of Essex. She was on a voyage from Saint Petersburg to London.
Prince Gustaff Adolph	Sweden	The brig ran aground on the Goodwin Sands, Kent, Great Britain and was wrecked. Her crew were rescued. She was on a voyage from Gefle to Alicante, Spain.
Resolution	Great Britain	The ship was lost in the Shetland Islands. She was on a voyage from Trondheim, Norway to the Strait of Gibraltar.
Robert and Mary	Great Britain	The ship ran aground and sank in the Irish Sea 6 nautical miles (11 km) east of The Skerries, Isle of Anglesey. Her crew were rescued. She was on a voyage from Liverpool to Lisbon, Portugal.
Robert and Susannah	Great Britain	The ship was run down by another vessel and sank in the North Sea off Sunderland, County Durham.
Two Brothers	Great Britain	The ship was driven ashore and wrecked near East Dean, Sussex. She was on a voyage from Málaga, Spain to London.
Unity	Great Britain	The ship foundered in the English Channel off Penzance, Cornwall. She was on a voyage from Bristol, Gloucestershire to Rouen, Seine-Inférieure, France.
Vrow Maria	Dutch Republic	The ship was wrecked on the Dutch coast. She was on a voyage from Saint Petersburg to Ancona, Papal States.
Wahlfish	(Sweden) Swedish Pomerania	The ship foundered in the Baltic Sea while on a voyage from Rügenwalde to Copenhagen, Denmark.
Wexford	Ireland	The ship departed from Cork for Porto, Portugal. No further trace, presumed foundered in the Atlantic Ocean with the loss of all hands.
Unnamed	Flag unknown	The ship was driven ashore near "Dragacre". She was on a voyage from Saint Petersburg to Livorno, Grand Duchy of Tuscany.

== December ==
=== 1 December ===
List of shipwrecks: 1 December 1790
Ship	State	Description
Nanny	Great Britain	The ship was wrecked at St Mary's, Isles of Scilly. She was on a voyage from Swansey, Glamorgan to Falmouth, Cornwall.
Sacre Famille	France	The brigantine was driven ashore and wrecked at Pevensey, Sussex, Great Britain.
St. George	Great Britain	The ship foundered on the Wicklow Banks, in the Irish Sea off the coast of County Wicklow, Ireland.
Unnamed	Flag unknown	The ship was wrecked on the North Bull, off the coast of County Dublin, Ireland.
Unnamed	Flag unknown	The ship foundered on the Wicklow Banks.

=== 2 December ===
List of shipwrecks: 3 December 1790
Ship	State	Description
HMRC Alert	Great Britain	The cutter was wrecked on the Chapel Rockets, west of Hartland Point, Devon with the loss of all hands.

=== 3 December ===
List of shipwrecks: 3 December 1790
Ship	State	Description
Unnamed	Great Britain	The sloop foundered in the North Sea off the coast of Yorkshire with the loss of all on board. She was on a voyage from Whitby, Yorkshire to Sunderland, County Durham.

=== 6 December ===
List of shipwrecks: 6 December 1790
Ship	State	Description
Admiral Campbell	Great Britain	The ship departed from Porto, Portugal for Falmouth, Cornwall. No further trace, presumed foundered with the loss of all hands.

=== 10 December ===
List of shipwrecks: 10 December 1790
Ship	State	Description
Juno	Great Britain	The ship foundered in the Irish Sea off Cork, Ireland. She was on a voyage from Bristol, Gloucestershire to Cork.

=== 14 December ===
List of shipwrecks: 14 December 1790
Ship	State	Description
Fame	Great Britain	The ship was wrecked near Liverpool, Lancashire with the loss of all hands. She was on a voyage from Cork, Ireland to Port Glasgow, Renfrewshire.
Levant	United States	The ship was driven ashore and wrecked at Liverpool. She was on a voyage from Philadelphia, Pennsylvania, United States to Liverpool.
Rachel	Great Britain	The ship was driven ashore and wrecked at Memel, Prussia.
Sophia	Great Britain	The ship was driven ashore and wrecked at Memel.
Three Brothers	Great Britain	The ship was driven ashore and wrecked at Memel.

=== 22 December ===
List of shipwrecks: 22 December 1790
Ship	State	Description
Lucy	Great Britain	The ship foundered off Holyhead, Anglesey while on a voyage from Lisbon, Portugal to Holyhead. Her crew were rescued.

=== 24 December ===
List of shipwrecks: 24 December 1790
Ship	State	Description
Malahide	Ireland	The sailing barge foundered in Dublin Bay with the loss of all eight of her crew.

=== 26 December ===
List of shipwrecks: 26 December 1790
Ship	State	Description
Mary	Ireland	The ship struck the Splaugh Rock, off the coast of County Wexford and was abandoned by her crew. She was on a voyage from Dublin to Dungarvan, County Waterford.

=== 27 December ===
List of shipwrecks: 27 December 1790
Ship	State	Description
Negotie	Dutch East India Company	The ship was wrecked on Texel. She was on a voyage from Amsterdam to Ceylon.

=== 28 December ===
List of shipwrecks: 28 December 1790
Ship	State	Description
Unnamed	Flag unknown	The ship capsized in the English Channel off the coast of Nord, France.

=== Unknown date ===
List of shipwrecks: Unknown date in December 1790
Ship	State	Description
Advice	Great Britain	The ship ran aground on The Brambles, in The Solent. She was on a voyage from Sunderland, County Durham to Southampton, Hampshire.
Aimable Aime	France	The ship was driven ashore on the Île de Ré, Charente-Maritime and severely damaged. She was on a voyage from Guadeloupe to Bordeaux, Gironde.
Alert	Great Britain	The ship was wrecked at Bude, Cornwall with the loss of all hands while on a voyage from Bristol, Gloucestershire to Africa.
Amity's Increase	Great Britain	The ship was driven ashore near Cowes, Isle of Wight. She was on a voyage from Cowes to Hull, Yorkshire.
Aurora	Colberg	The ship foundered in the Baltic Sea. She was on a voyage from Colberg to Dublin, Ireland.
Benjamin	Great Britain	The ship was abandoned in the North Sea 14 leagues (42 nautical miles (78 km) east of Whitby, Yorkshire. She was on a voyage from Memel, Prussia to Plymouth, Devon.
Catharina Dorothea	Great Britain	The ship was abandoned whilst on a voyage from Arkhangelsk, Russia to Amsterdam. She was later taken in to the "Lunna".
Cresswell	Great Britain	The ship foundered off the Dutch coast with the loss of all hands.
Dorothea	Danzig	The ship was driven ashore at Skagen, Denmark. She was on a voyage from London to Danzig.
Deux Anges	France	The ship departed from Bordeaux on 30 or 31 December for "the Cape". No further trace, reported missing.
Deuz Felicites	France	The ship foundered in the Bay of Biscay off Nantes, Loire-Inférieure while on a voyage from Marseille, Bouches-du-Rhône to Nantes.
Duc de Normandie	France	The ship departed from Bordeaux on 30 or 31 December from Port-au-Prince. No further trace, reported missing.
Elizabeth	Great Britain	The ship was driven ashore at Saltfleet, Lincolnshire.
El Rayo	Spain	The ship was wrecked on Anegada, Virgin Islands. Her crew survived. She was on a voyage from Bilbao to Puerto Rico.
Emanuel	Great Britain	The ship was lost near Bordeaux with the loss of two of her crew. She was on a voyage from London to Bordeaux.
Favourite	Great Britain	The ship foundered in the Kattegat off Marstrand, Sweden with the loss of all but one of her crew. She was on a voyage from Lisbon, Portugal to Stockholm, Sweden.
Friendship	Great Britain	The ship capsized in the Baltic Sea. She was on a voyage from Riga to Liverpool. She was subsequently taken in to "Swincoe", Norway.
Gainsborough	Great Britain	The ship was lost at Dagerort, Russia. Her crew were rescued.
Golden Rule	Great Britain	The ship was driven ashore near St Davids Head, Pembrokeshire.
Hamburgh Commerce	Hamburg	The ship was driven ashore in the River Thames at Cuckold's Point and was severely damaged. She was on a voyage from Hamburg to London.
Harmony	Great Britain	The ship was destroyed by fire at Blackwall, Middlesex.
Harvey	Great Britain	The ship was wrecked at South Shields, County Durham. She was on a voyage from London to South Shields and Jamaica.
Hazard	Great Britain	The ship struck the pier at Ramsgate, Kent and sank. She was on a voyage from Stockholm to Marseille, Bouches-du-Rhône, France.
Hope	Ireland	The ship was wrecked on the Goodwin Sands, Kent, Great Britain. She was on a voyage from Memel to Liverpool.
Hope	Great Britain	The ship was lost near Kinsale, County Cork, Ireland. She was on a voyage from Padstow, Cornwall to Cork.
Hope	Great Britain	The ship ran aground in the Cattewater. She was refloated but was found to be so severely damaged that she was condemned.
Hope	Great Britain	The ship was driven ashore north of Ravenglass, Cumberland. She was on a voyage from Ipswich, Suffolk to Liverpool.
Hope	Great Britain	The ship was lost off the coast of Florida, New Spain. She was on a voyage from Jamaica to Charleston, South Carolina, United States.
Isis	Great Britain	The ship was driven ashore on the south coast of the Isle of Wight. She was on a voyage from the Charente to London.
John & Mary	Great Britain	The ship was driven ashore and wrecked on Bornholm, Denmark. She was on a voyage from Memel to Kincardine.
L'Aimable Marianne	France	The ship departed from Bordeaux for Port-au-Prince on 30 or 31 December. No further trace, reported missing.
La Princesse des Asturies	France	The ship departed from Bordeaux for a port in Louisiana, United States on 30 or 31 December. No further trace, reported missing.
Little Betsey	Ireland	The ship was driven ashore in the Sound of Islay. She was on a voyage from Stockholm to Waterford.
Maria	Great Britain	The ship was wrecked near Appledore, Devon. She was on a voyage from Charleston to London.
Mary	Great Britain	The ship foundered in the Atlantic Ocean 53 leagues (159 nautical miles (294 km) west of Ouessant, Finistère, France.
Mary and Harriot	Great Britain	The ship was wrecked near Arbroath, Forfarshire. She was on a voyage from Riga to Dundee, Perthshire.
Mary Ann	Great Britain	The ship foundered in the Baltic Sea off Skagen, Denmark while on a voyage from Danzig to Newcastle-upon-Tyne, Northumberland.
Molly	Great Britain	The ship foundered in the Irish Sea while on a voyage from Waterford to Bristol, Gloucestershire.
Molly	Great Britain	The ship was driven ashore at Hoylake, Cheshire. All on board were rescued. She was on a voyage from the West Indies to Liverpool.
Nanny	Great Britain	The ship was driven ashore at Whitby. Her crew were rescued.
Newbury	Great Britain	The ship was driven ashore and wrecked at Hoylake with the loss of three of her crew. She was on a voyage from a port in North Carolina, United States to Glasgow.
Passe Partout	France	The ship was lost near L'Orient. She was on a voyage from Nantes to Africa.
Peggy	Great Britain	The ship sank in the River Shannon. She was on a voyage from Limerick, Ireland to Greenock, Renfrewshire.
Pelican	Great Britain	The ship was driven ashore.
Perseverance	Great Britain	The ship was driven ashore and wrecked at Padstow, Cornwall. She was on a voyage from Lisbon to Liverpool.
Persis	Great Britain	The ship was driven ashore on the coast of Yorkshire.
Placentia	Great Britain	The ship was driven ashore and wrecked at Pool, Dorset.
Prudence	Great Britain	The ship was driven ashore near Saltfleet. She was on a voyage from London to Hull.
Resolution	Great Britain	The ship foundered in the Bristol Channel off Worms Head, Glamorgan with the loss of all hands. She was on a voyage from London to Barnstaple, Devon.
Swallow	Great Britain	The ship was lost near Dublin, Ireland. She was on a voyage from Dublin to Gatcombe, Gloucestershire.
Swan	Great Britain	The ship was driven ashore near "Eckholme". She was on a voyage from Riga to Liverpool.
Three Brothers	Great Britain	The ship was driven ashore at St. Ives, Cornwall while on a voyage from Waterford to London.
Tigris	Great Britain	The ship foundered in the Mediterranean Sea off Malta with the loss of four of her crew. She was on a voyage from Zant, Venetian Republic to London.
Two Friends	Dutch Republic	The ship was driven ashore on the Barbary Coast. She was on a voyage from Amsterdam to Mogadore, Morocco.
Two Brothers	Great Britain	The ship ran aground on The Skerries, Ireland She was on a voyage from Saint Petersburg, Russia to Dublin. Two Brothers was refloated in March 1791 and taken in to Dublin.
Ureede	Dutch Republic	The ship was lost on the Dutch coast. She was on a voyage from London to Amsterdam.
Vrow Cornelia	Dutch Republic	The ship was driven ashore and wrecked on Texel. She was on a voyage from Amsterdam to Livorno, Grand Duchy of Tuscany. Vrow Cornelia was refloated in January 1791.
Vrow Gertruda	Dutch Republic	The ship was wrecked on the Dutch coast.
William	Great Britain	The ship was driven ashore at Holyhead, Anglesey. She was on a voyage from Lisbon to Cork and Dublin.

== Unknown date ==
List of shipwrecks: Unknown in date 1790
Ship	State	Description
Admiral Hughes	Great Britain	The ship was lost off the coast of Cuba. Her crew were rescued. She was on a voyage from Jamaica to New York, United States.
Amelia	Great Britain	The ship was lost on the north coast of Grenada.
Amity	Great Britain	The ship foundered in the Grand Banks of Newfoundland with the loss of five of her crew. She was on a voyage from the West Indies to Newfoundland, British America.
Ann	Great Britain	The ship was driven ashore in the Saint Lawrence River.
Ann and Elizabeth	Ireland	The ship was wrecked at Jamaica. She was on a voyage from Belfast, County Antrim to Jamaica.
Apollo	Great Britain	The ship was lost in the Gulf of Florida. She was on a voyage from Jamaica to London.
Aurora	Great Britain	The ship was lost whilst on a voyage from Africa to the West Indies.
Berbice Verlance	Dutch Republic	The ship ran aground in the Sierra Leone River.
Betsey	Great Britain	The ship was wrecked on Barbuda. Her crew were rescued. She was on a voyage from Savannah, Georgia, United States to Grenada.
Betsey	Great Britain	The ship foundered in the Atlantic Ocean. Her crew were rescued by Union (Great Britain). Betsey was on a voyage from New York to Liverpool, Lancashire.
Brilliant	Great Britain	The whaler was lost off the coast of Greenland.
Caladonia	Great Britain	The ship was wrecked on a rock in the Davis Strait. Her crew were rescued.
Charlotte	(Kingdom of Great Britain) Guernsey	The ship foundered in the Atlantic Ocean off Bass Island, Newfoundland while on a voyage from Guernsey to a port in Virginia, United States.
Chorrebe	France	The ship was lost at Mozambique. She was on a voyage from the Île de France, Mauritius to Mozambique.
Delight	(Kingdom of Great Britain) British America	The ship foundered in the Atlantic Ocean with the loss of two of her seven crew. Survivors were rescued by John & Mary (Great Britain). Delight was on a voyage from Shelburne, Nova Scotia to Montserrat.
Despatch	Great Britain	The ship was wrecked near Livorno, Grand Duchy of Tuscany while on a voyage from Gibraltar to Livorno.
Diligence	Great Britain	The ship foundered while on a voyage from Saint Petersburgh, Russia to London.
Dogger Bank	Dutch East India Company	The East Indiaman foundered in the Pacific Ocean between the Cape of Good Hope and Java while on a voyage from the Dutch Republic to China.
Elizabeth	Great Britain	The ship was lost on the Arnage Reef. She was on a voyage from the West Indies to New Brunswick, British America.
El Rayo	Spain	The ship was wrecked on Anegada, Virgin Islands. Her crew survived. She was on a voyage from Bilbao to Puerto Rico.
Essex	Great Britain	The whaler was lost off Greenland.
Firmina	Spain	The ship was lost whilst on a voyage from St. Andero to Guayrá, Viceroyalty of Peru. Her crew were rescued.
Flora	Great Britain	The ship foundered in the Atlantic Ocean off the coast of the United States. She was on a voyage from Virginia, United States to a European port.
Flora	Great Britain	The ship was lost on The Jordains. She was on a voyage from Jamaica to Leith, Lothian.
Flora	Great Britain	The ship was driven ashore 25 nautical miles (46 km) north of Cape Charles, Virginia. She was on a voyage from London to Philadelphia, Pennsylvania, United States.
Friends	Great Britain	The whaler was lost off Greenland.
Friendship	Great Britain	The ship was lost in the Davis Strait.
Friendship	Great Britain	The ship was lost at Jamaica. She was on a voyage from Jamaica to Virginia.
Galicia Packet	Great Britain	The ship was lost at Saint Pierre and Miquelon. She was on a voyage from Naples, Kingdom of Sicily to Newfoundland.
General Washington	United States	The ship foundered in the Atlantic Ocean while on a voyage from Philadelphia to Glasgow, Renfrewshire, Great Britain.
Henrica	Denmark	The ship was destroyed by fire at "Saloa".
Hope	Great Britain	The ship was wrecked off Grenada.
Hope	Dutch Republic	African slave trade: The ship sprang a leak in the Atlantic Ocean. She was beached at Cape Orange, Brazil with the loss of most of the slaves on board. Hope was on a voyage from Vlissingen, Zeeland to Africa and the West Indies.
Hope	Great Britain	The whaler was lost off the coast of Greenland.
Humber	Great Britain	The ship ran aground off Reval, Russia and was wrecked.
Jenny	Great Britain	The ship foundered in the Atlantic Ocean whilst on a voyage from Boston to the West Indies.
Jenny	Great Britain	The ship was abandoned in the Atlantic Ocean. She was on a voyage from New York to Antigua.
Jessie	Great Britain	The ship foundered in the Atlantic Ocean off Charleston, South Carolina, United States. She was on a voyage from Jamaica to Bristol, Gloucestershire.
Kenton	Great Britain	The ship foundered in the Atlantic Ocean while on a voyage from Jamaica to London. Her crew were rescued by a ship bound for France.
La Grace	France	The ship foundered in the North Sea off Ostend, West Flanders, Dutch Republic while on a voyage from Cádiz, Spain to Ostend.
Le Belisaire	France	The ship was lost on the Salt Pond Reef. Her crew were rescued. She was on a voyage from Aux Cayes, Saint-Domingue to Philadelphia.
Le Castor	France	The ship was lost whilst on a voyage from Saint-Domingue to Marseille, Bouches-du-Rhône.
Le Duc de Amour	France	The ship was lost whilst on a voyage from Saint-Domingue to Bordeaux, Gironde.
Le Dugay	France	The ship was lost whilst on a voyage from Saint-Domingue to Nantes, Loire-Inférieure.
Lerieux	France	The ship was lost whilst on a voyage from Saint-Domingue to Marseille.
Lion	Great Britain	The ship was lost at Jamaica.
Louisa	(Kingdom of Great Britain) British America	The ship was lost at Tybee Island, Georgia, United States.
Lovely Ann	Great Britain	The ship was driven ashore and wrecked at the Virginia Capes, United States. She was on a voyage from Glasgow to Virginia.
Marie Thérèse	France	The ship was wrecked near Bermuda. She was on a voyage from Saint-Domingue to Bordeaux.
Mary	Great Britain	The ship was lost on the coast of Africa.
Mary	Flag unknown	The ship was wrecked on the "Shoals of Grandie". She was on a voyage from Boston to an African port.
Morse	Great Britain	The whaler was driven ashore in Saldanha Bay, She was on a voyage from London to the South Seas.
Pusey Hall	Great Britain	The ship was driven ashore at Cape Lookout, North Carolina. She was on a voyage from Jamaica to Virginia.
Recovery	Great Britain	The brig was lost whilst on a voyage from Havre de Grâce, Seine-Inférieure, France to Virginia. Her crew and 90 passengers were rescued.
Santa Marie	Spain	The ship was lost at Saint Augustine, Florida, New Spain. She was on a voyage from Saint Augustine to Havana, Cuba.
Speedwell	Great Britain	The ship was driven ashore at Georgetown. She was on a voyage from Wilmington, Delaware, United States to London.
Thomson or Thompson	Great Britain	The whaler was lost off Greenland.
Two Friends	Great Britain	The ship was driven ashore near Old Harbour, Jamaica. She was on a voyage from Jamaica to Lancaster, Lancashire.
Urania	Great Britain	The whaler was lost off Greenland.
William	Ireland	The ship was driven ashore at the Virginia Capes.
Zee Nymph	Dutch East India Company	The East Indiaman was wrecked in False Bay. She was on a voyage from Amsterdam to Jakarta, Netherlands East Indies.
Eight unnamed vessels	Imperial Russian Navy	Russo-Swedish War: The rowing gunboats were lost without a trace in the skerries off the coast of Finland, each with 70 crew aboard.
