= Rhadine and Leontichus =

In Greek mythology, Rhadine (Ancient Greek: Ῥαδίνη, romanized: Rhadínē) and Leontichus (Ancient Greek: Λεόντιχος, romanized: Leóntikhos) were star-crossed lovers from the town of Samus in Triphylia (later Samicum; not to be confused with Samos).

== Legend ==
The story of Rhadine and Leontichus was recounted in a poem entitled Rhadine (now lost), misattributed to Stesichorus. Strabo in his Geographica quotes the initial lines of the poem (invocation of the Muse Erato) and then gives a brief synopsis of the work, which is as follows. Rhadine was betrothed to a tyrant of Corinth and sent to him on board the ship as the west wind was blowing; meanwhile, her brother went with the same wind to Delphi as chief of an embassy. Leontichus (referred to as "Rhadine's cousin" rather than by name) hurried to Corinth on his chariot to see Rhadine. Apparently, the tyrant was outraged on discovering that his fiancee had an affair with another man; he ordered to kill both Rhadine and Leontichus and to send their bodies away on the chariot. Later, however, he repented, sent for the chariot to be brought back and gave proper burial to the lovers.

Pausanias makes mention of the tomb of Rhadine and Leontichus, which, however, he places on the island Samos (rather than the town) on the road to Heraeum. The tomb, he wrote, was frequented by star-crossed lovers who came there to pray for a happy outcome of their misfortunes in love.

== Bibliography ==
- Pausanias, Pausanias Description of Greece with an English Translation by W.H.S. Jones, Litt.D., and H.A. Ormerod, M.A., in 4 Volumes. Cambridge, MA, Harvard University Press; London, William Heinemann Ltd. 1918. Online version at the Perseus Digital Library.
- Strabo, The Geography of Strabo. Edition by H.L. Jones. Cambridge, Mass.: Harvard University Press; London: William Heinemann, Ltd. 1924. Online version at the Perseus Digital Library.
