= Erato =

Muse of erotic and lyric poetry in Greek mythology

- Goddess of erotic and lyrical poetry
- Member of the Muses
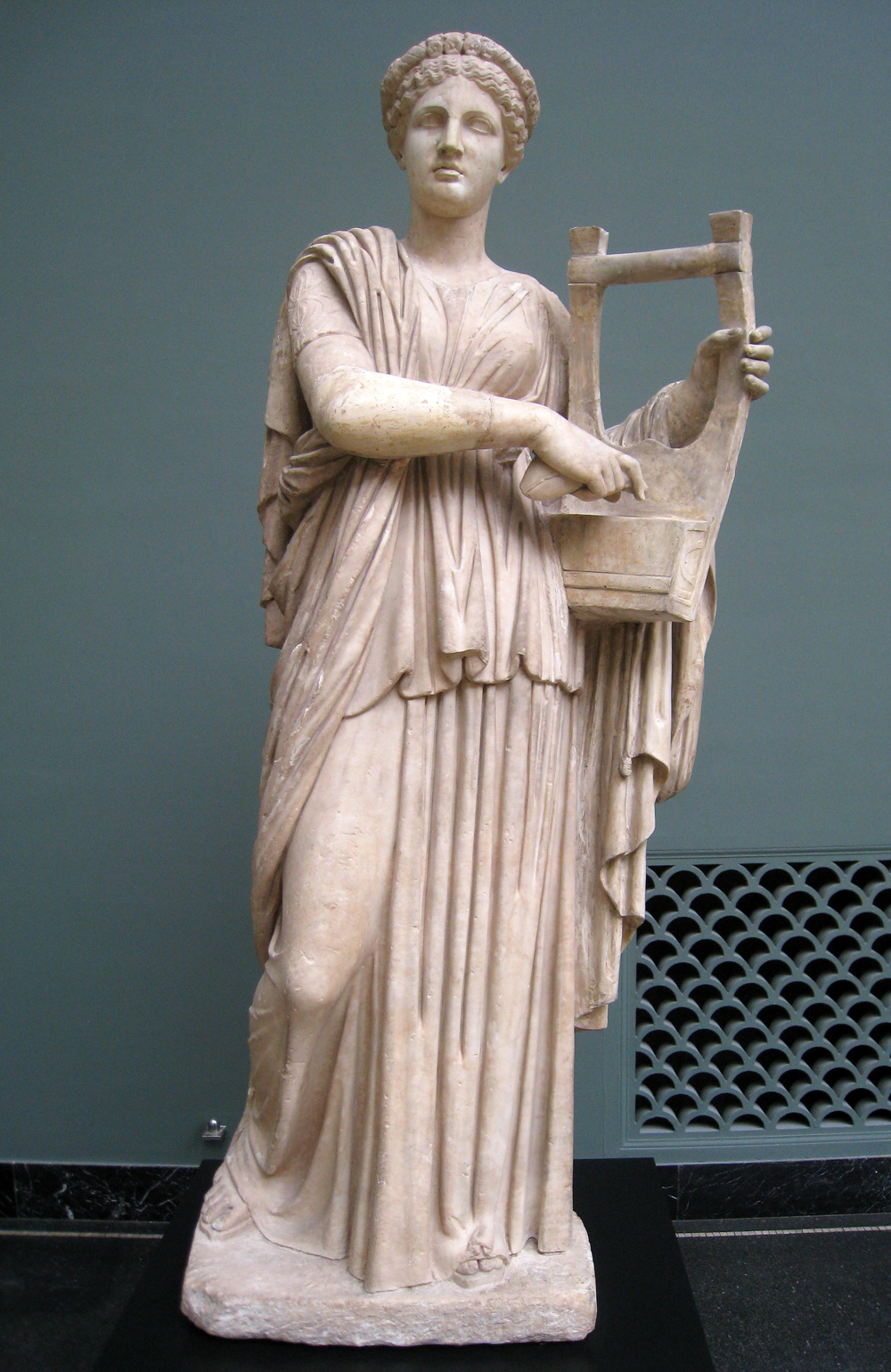
- Roman statue of Erato (2nd century AD), playing the kithara or lyre
- Abode: Mount Olympus
- Symbols: Lyre, kithara

Genealogy
- Parents: Zeus and Mnemosyne
- Siblings: Euterpe, Polyhymnia, Urania, Clio, Calliope, Thalia, Terpsichore, Melpomene and several paternal half-siblings
- Consort: Malus (Μάλος)
- Children: Cleophema

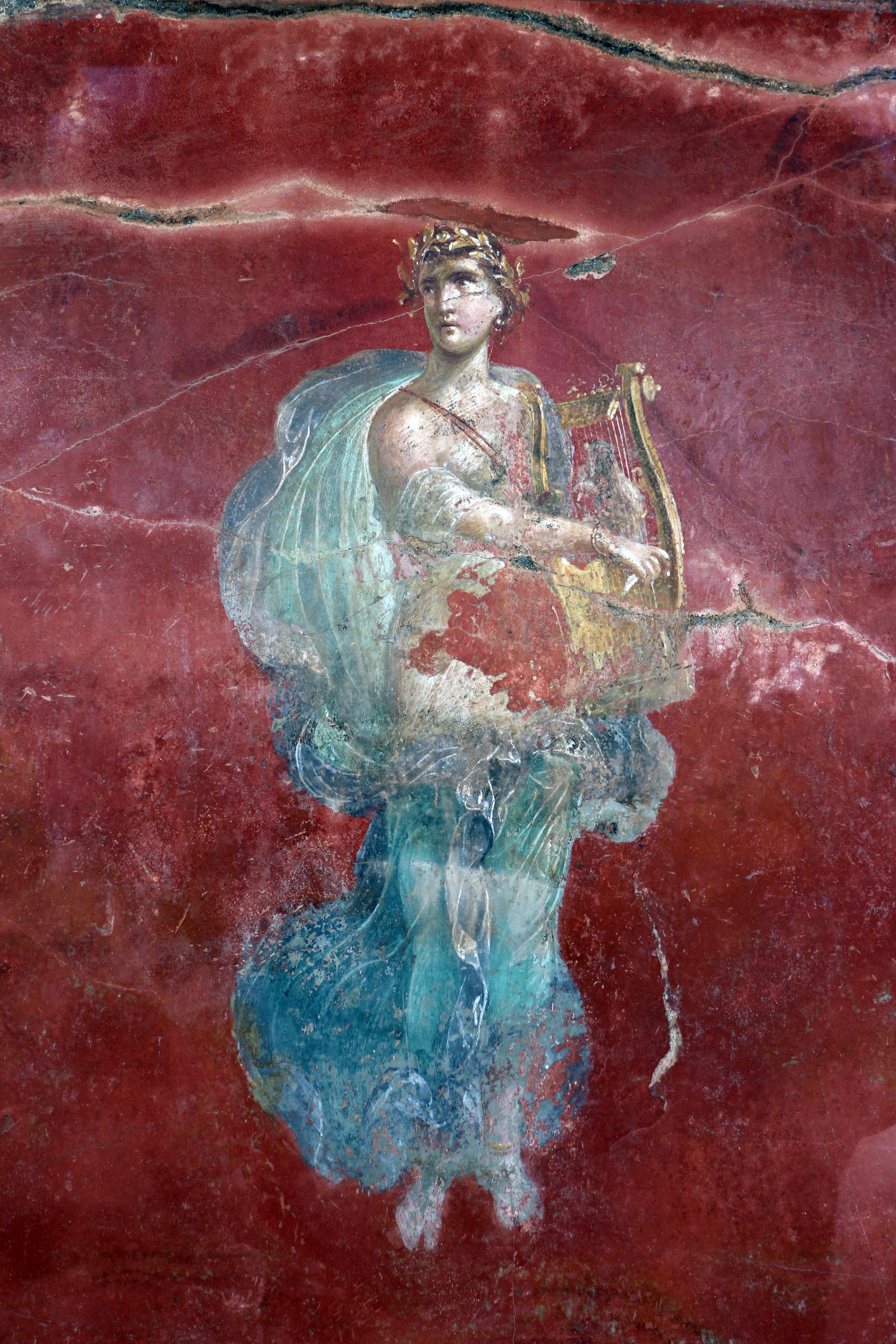
Erato on an antique fresco from Pompeii

In Greek mythology, Erato (/ˈɛrətoʊ/; Ancient Greek: Ἐρατώ) is one of the Muses, associated with erotic lyric poetry. The name would mean "desired" or "lovely", if derived from the same root as Eros, as Apollonius of Rhodes playfully suggested in the invocation to Erato that begins Book III of his Argonautica.

== Function ==
Erato is the Muse of lyric poetry, particularly erotic poetry, and mimic imitation. In the Orphic hymn to the Muses, it is Erato who charms the sight. Since the Renaissance she has mostly been shown with a wreath of myrtle and roses, holding a lyre, or a small kithara, a musical instrument often associated with Apollo. In Simon Vouet's representations, two turtle-doves are eating seeds at her feet. She is sometimes depicted holding a golden arrow, symbolizing "eros", the feeling she inspires in everybody; at times she is accompanied by Eros, holding a torch.

== Family ==
In Hesiod's genealogy, Erato is the daughter of Zeus and the Titaness Mnemosyne, and the sister to Calliope, Clio, Euterpe, Melpomene, Polyhymnia, Terpsichore, Thalia and Urania.

Her father gave Erato to Malus (eponym of Malea), as a bride and by him became the mother of Cleophema who bore Aegle (Coronis) by Phlegyas.

== Development ==
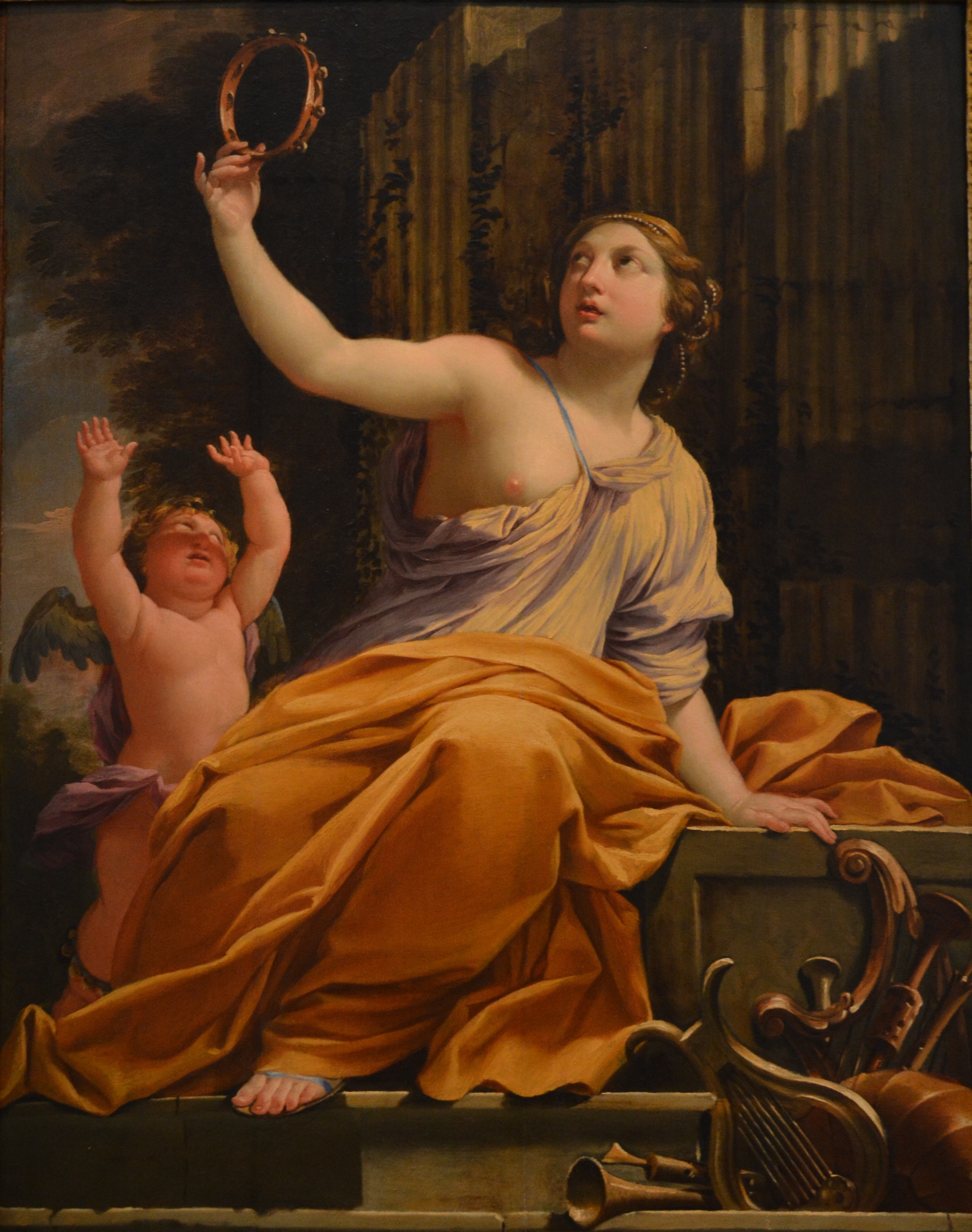
Erato by Simon Vouet

Erato was named with the other muses in Hesiod's Theogony. She was also invoked at the beginning of a lost poem, Rhadine (Ῥαδινή), that was referred to and briefly quoted by Strabo. The love story of Rhadine made her supposed tomb on the island of Samos a pilgrimage site for star-crossed lovers in the time of Pausanias and Erato has linked again with love in Plato's Phaedrus; nevertheless, even in the third century BC, when Apollonius wrote, the Muses were not yet as inextricably linked to specific types of poetry as they became.

Erato is also invoked at the start of book 7 of Virgil's Aeneid, which marks the beginning of the second half or "Iliadic" section of the poem.

== See also ==
- Muses in popular culture
