= Theodotus of Ancyra (martyr) =

4th-century Christian martyr

Saint Theodotus of Ancyra
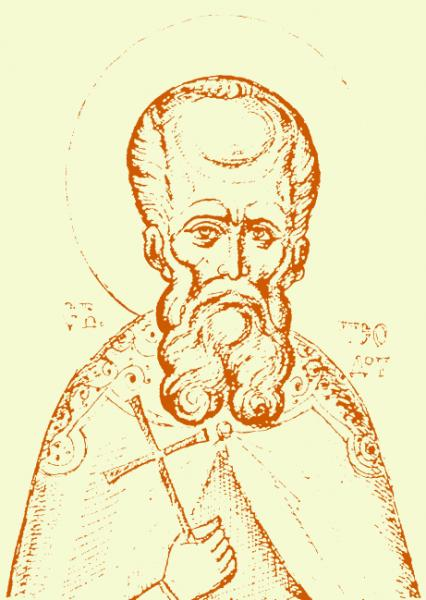

Martyr
- Died: ~303 AD; Anatolia (modern-day Turkey)
- Venerated in: Roman Catholic Church; Orthodox Church; Armenian Apostolic Church
- Feast: 18 May; 7 June; Thursday after 3rd Sunday of Pentecost (Armenian Apostolic Church)
- Attributes: torches; sword
- Patronage: innkeepers

Saint Theodotus of Ancyra (Greek: Θεόδοτος Άγκυρας) was a fourth-century (fl. 303 AD) Christian martyr.

== Hagiography ==
On 18 May, the Roman Martyrology says: "At Ancyra, in Galatia, the martyr Saint Theodotus and the saintly virgins Thecusa, his aunt, Alexandra, Claudia, Faina, Euphrasia, Matrona and Julitta," etc. They are mentioned in all the menologies, and Theodotus has a special feast on 7 June.

According to the Acts (Acta Sanctorum, May, IV, 147), Theodotus was a married man who kept an inn at Ancyra, the capital of the Roman province of Galatia. He is described as a man very zealous in the performance of his Christian duties, endowed with many virtues, especially charity towards his neighbour, bringing sinners to repentance and strengthening many in their faith during the persecution which the Roman governor Theoctenus was carrying on in the province, about 303, in accordance with the imperial edict of Diocletian.

The name of a certain Victor is mentioned as one who grew weak in his profession of Christianity and received much encouragement from Theodotus. Theoctenus ordered that all provisions exposed for sale should first be offered to the idols. Theodotus laid in stores of goods, and his house became a refuge for the Christians, a hospital for the sick, and a place for Christian worship.

At Malos, about five miles from Ancyra, he sought out the body of the martyr, Valens, and gave it a Christian burial. Returning to Ancyra, he found the Christians in great trouble. The seven virgins mentioned above had been called before the judges and made a valiant profession of their faith; they were then sent to a house of debauchery, but preserved their purity. Then they were obliged to suffer cruel torments, and were cast into the sea with stones attached to their bodies.

According to legend, Theodotus succeeded in retrieving the bodies and honourably burying them. In consequence, he was arrested, and, after many sufferings, was killed by the sword; his body was miraculously brought to Malos and there entombed by the priest, Fronto. A chapel was built over the grave, and the saint was held in great veneration.
