= Panagia Tourliani, Mykonos =

18th-century Greek Orthodox monastery

Panagia Tourliani
- Παναγία Τουρλιανή
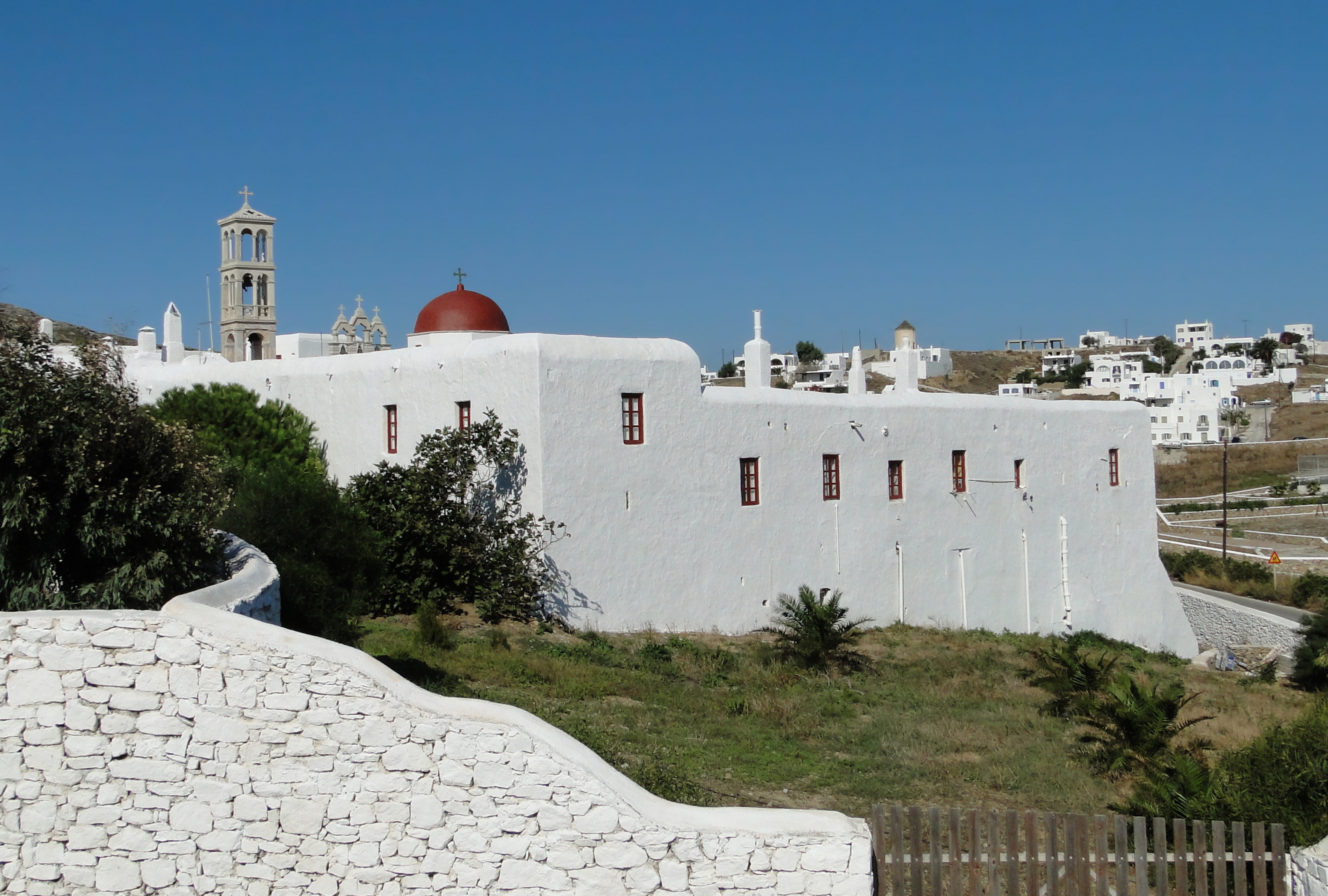
- Interactive map of Panagia Tourliani

Monastery information
- Established: 1542
- Dedicated to: Dormition of Theotokos
- Celebration date: August 15 & 23
- Diocese: Metropolis of Syros

Site
- Location: Ano Mera, Mykonos
- Country: Greece
- Coordinates: 37°26′51″N 25°23′31″E

The Panagia Tourliani (Greek: Παναγία Τουρλιανή) is the most important monastery of Mykonos named after the patron saint of the island. It is located in Ano Mera Mykonos at a distance of seven kilometers from Mykonos Town.

== Description ==
According to tradition, the Monastery of Panagia Tourliani was built by fugitive Monks of the Archontissa of Paros, who sought asylum on the island of Mykonos. The Monks took refuge in the upper part of the island, in the small church of Panagia, where the Nun Tourli served.

According to another version, the name of the monastery is due to the fact that the miraculous icon of the Virgin Mary was found in the sea area of Tourlos outside Mykonos Town. The miraculous icon of the Virgin Mary is considered to be the work of Luke the Evangelist. It belongs to the Holy Metropolis of Syros.

The monastery of Panagia Tourliani was founded in 1542 where there used to be a church of the Entrances of Panagia. In 1757 - 1767 the monastery was renovated by the hieromonk Ignatios Basoula and thus acquired its current form. The monastery is dedicated to the Dormition of Theotokos.

On August 15, there is a big festival in the monastery. On August 23 (Apodosis of the Dormition of Theotokos) is the main feast of the monastery. The icon of Panagia Tourliani is taken with a litany every first Sunday of Lent in Chora, to one of the three parish churches of Chora (Megali Panagia, Panachrantos, Saint Kyriaki), where it remains until the Saturday of Lazarus.

The catholicon of the monastery is a three-aisled cruciform Byzantine church with a dome and has a towering marble spire. The central aisle of the catholicon is dedicated to the Dormition of Theotokos, the left aisle is dedicated to the Nativity of the Theotokos and the right aisle to Saint Ignatius the Bearer. The monastery's catholicon features an imposing gilded wood-carved altarpiece in the Baroque style, designed and built in 1775 by Florentine artists. The iconostasis is 10.20 meters long and covers all three aisles of the church. The icons of the icon were made by the iconographer Ioannis from Corfu.

A church museum operates in the monastery. The exhibits include icons, gold-embroidered epitaphs, and the first bells of the Monastery.

At the beginning of the 20th century the monastery functioned as a nursing home and later as an orphanage. A kindergarten, a primary school, a square and a spiritual center were created with the free allocation of plots of land belonging to the monastery.

== Sources ==
- The original version of this entry was based on a text published by the Apostolic Ministry of the Church of Greece. Published on Wikipedia under license.
