= Morse (1784 ship) =

Royal Navy (1747), merchantman, and whaler (1784–1802)

History

Great Britain
- Launched: 1747
- Fate: Sold

Great Britain
- Acquired: By purchase
- Renamed: 1775: John and Alice; 1776: Potomack; 1779: Betsy; 1782: Resolution; 1784: Morse
- Fate: Last mentioned in August 1802

General characteristics
- Tons burthen: 250, or 276 (bm)
- Notes: 10 × 6-pounder guns (1800)

Morse was launched in 1747 for the British Royal Navy, but under another name. After 1775 she was John and Alice (1775), Potomack (1776–1779), Betsy (1780–1781), and then in 1782 Resolution. In 1784 S. Mellish purchased her and she became the whaler Morse. She initially engaged in whale hunting in the British northern whale fishery. Then from 1787 she made numerous voyages as a whaler primarily in the southern whale fishery, but with some returns to the northern fishery. There is no further mention of her in Lloyd's List Ship arrival and departure (SAD) data after August 1802.

== Origins and early career ==
Although Morse apparently began as a Royal Navy vessel launched in 1747, it has so far proved impossible using online resources to determine her original name, and so to fill in the details between 1747 and her appearance in 1775 as John and Alice. She apparently was rebuilt in 1763, but whether this was before or after the Navy sold her is an open question, as are any other names she may have borne during this period.

| Ship | Year | Master | Owner | Trade | Source |
|---|---|---|---|---|---|
| John and Alice | 1775 | | | | |
| Potomack | 1776 | James Mitchel | Eden & Co. | Maryland–London | LR; good repair in 1775 |
| | 1778 | J.Mitchell | Eden & Co. | London-Lisbon; London–Grenada | LR; repaired in 1775 & 1777 |
| | 1779 | J.Mitchell | Eden & Co. | London–Saint Augustine | LR; repaired in 1775 & 1777, and thorough repair in 1779 |
| Betsy | 1780 | Waterhouse | Kilbington | London transport London–Greenland | LR; rebuilt in 1763, repaired in 1775, 1777, and 1779 |
| | 1781 | Waterhouse; Sinclair | Kilbington | London–Greenland | LR; rebuilt in 1763, repaired in 1775, 1777, and 1779 |
| Resolution | 1782 | W.Sinclair; T.Kentish | R.Dowden | London transport | LR; rebuilt in 1763, repaired in 1775, 1777, and 1779 |
| | 1783 | T.Kentish; W.Tullock | Dowding | London transport | LR; rebuilt in 1763, repaired in 1775, 1777, and 1779 |
| | 1784 | W.Tullock | Dowding | London | LR; rebuilt in 1763, repaired in 1775, 1777, and 1779 |

Resolution last appeared in Lloyd's Register (LR) in 1784.

== Morse ==
=== British northern whale fishery ===
Morse first appeared in 1784 with R.Brown, master, S.Mellish, owner, and trade London–Greenland. She had been rebuilt in 1763, repaired in 1775, 1777, and 1779, and had undergone a thorough repair in 1784.

In August 1785 Morse, Coulson, master, arrived at Yarmouth with 5½ "fish" (whales). She arrived at Gravesend on 9 August.

A report in July 1786 of vessels still fishing at Greenland reported Morse with two fish. On 14 July Morse, Coltson, master, returned to Gravesend having taken six fish and 250 seals.

| Year | Master | Owner | Trade | Source |
|---|---|---|---|---|
| 1786 | Coulson | J.Metcalf | London–Greenland | LR; rebuilt 1763, thorough repair 1784, & good repair 1785 |

On 28 July 1787 Morse, Coulson, master, returned to Gravesend with six fish.

On 27 August 1788 Morse, Allen, master returned to Gravesend from Greenland with three fish.

=== British southern whale fishery ===
1st southern whale fishery voyage (1789–1791): Captain R.Mills sailed from London on 16 October 1789, bound for the coast of southern Africa. Early in 1790 Morse was driven ashore in Saldanha Bay. She was reported to have been at Thompson's Island c. October with 600 barrels of right whale oil. Morse arrived back at London on 19 June 1791, under the command of Captain Mallen (or W. Malen, or William Maley), who at some point had replaced Mills.

2nd southern whale fishery voyage (1791–1793): Captain Abijah Lock (or Locke) sailed from London on 27 October 1791, bound for the Pacific and the coast of Peru. Morse returned on 19 April 1793 with 113 tuns of sperm oil and 850 seal skins.

Northern whale fishery voyage (1793–11794): Between 1793 and 1794 Morse was under the command of Captain Coulson, who sailed her to the Greenland fishery.

| Year | Master | Owner | Trade | Source |
|---|---|---|---|---|
| 1794 | Lock; J.Coulson | J.Metcalfe | London–Southern Fishery | LR; rebuilt 1763, thorough repair 1784, good repairs 1785 & 1788, and damages repaired 1791 |
| 1795 | J.Coulson | J.Metcalfe | London–Greenland | LR; rebuilt 1763, thorough repair 1784, good repairs 1785 & 1788, and damages repaired 1791 |
| 1796 | J.Coulson | J.Metcalfe | London–Greenland | LR; rebuilt 1763, thorough repair 1784, good repairs 1785 & 1788, and damages repaired 1791 |

3rd South Whale Fishery voyage (1795): Captain James Coulson sailed from England on 27 February 1795, bound for Africa. Morse returned on 21 December with 173 tuns of whale oil and 135 cwt of whale bone, having returned via St Helena. She had left St Helena on 23 October in a convoy under the escort of HMS St Albans

4th southern whale fishery voyage (1796–1797): Captain James Coulson sailed from England on 12 April 1796, bound for the west coast of Africa. Morse returned on 27 July 1797 with 850 seal skins.

5th southern whale fishery voyage (1798–1799): Captain Abijah Lock sailed from London on 17 February 1798, bound for Walvis Bay. Morse returned to London on 17 July 1799

6th southern whale fishery voyage (1799–1801): Morse, J.French, master, probably sailed in late 1799. The whaler Morse, on her way to London, parted from the China Fleet (the East Indiamen returning from China) on 29 April 1801, off Ascension Island. On 28 June, Morse, Ingiter, master, arrived at Cork from South Georgia. Morse arrived back at Portsmouth from the South Seas on 11 August 1801.

Northern whale fishery voyage (1801–1802): Morse, Clay, master, arrived back at Gravesend on 11 August 1802 from Greenland.

== Fate ==
The return from Gravesend in August 1802 was the last mention of Morse in Lloyd's List's SAD data. The registers continued to carry her with stale or out of date data for some years thereafter.

| Year | Master | Owner | Trade | Source |
|---|---|---|---|---|
| 1802 | J.Jackson | De Echin | London–Southern Fishery | Register of Shipping; thorough repair 1799 |
| 1802 | J.Jenkston | De Echn & Co. | London–Southern Fishery | LR; rebuilt 1763, thorough repair 1784, good repair 1785, & large repair 1791 |
| 1804 | W.Clay | Wilshen | London–Greenland | RS; large repair 1799 & good repair 1803 |
| 1804 | J.Jenkston | De Echn & Co. | London–Southern Fishery | LR; rebuilt 1763, thorough repair 1784, good repair 1785, & large repair 1791 |
