= Malus (Galatia) =

Ancient town of Galatia

Coordinates: 40°07′36″N 33°20′27″E

Malus or Malos (Ancient Greek: Μάλος) was a town of ancient Galatia, inhabited during Roman and Byzantine times. It was the site of the martyrdom of Theodotus of Ancyra.

Its site is located near Kalecik, in Asiatic Turkey.
