= Malus (Pisidia) =

Ancient town of Pisidia

Coordinates: 37°42′05″N 30°56′32″E

Malus or Malos (Ancient Greek: Μάλος), also known as Mallus or Mallos (Μάλλος), was a town of ancient Pisidia, inhabited during Roman and Byzantine times. It became a bishopric; no longer the seat of a residential bishop, it remains a titular see of the Roman Catholic Church.

Its site is located near Sarıidris, in Asiatic Turkey.
