= Daniel in the Lions' Den (Rubens) =

Painting by Peter Paul Rubens

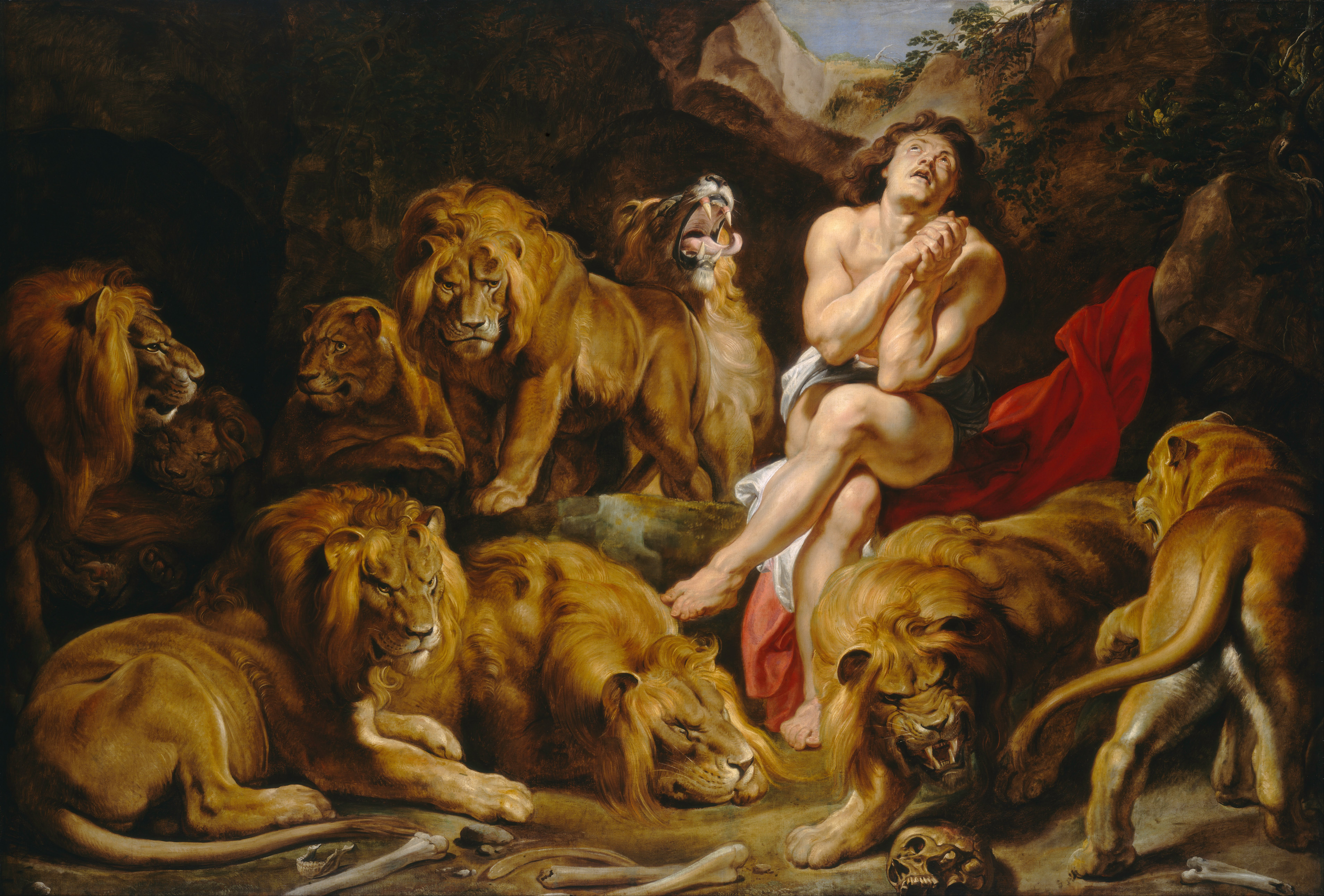
- Artist: Peter Paul Rubens
- Year: c. 1614 – c. 1616
- Medium: Oil on canvas
- Subject: Daniel in the lions' den
- Dimensions: 224.2 cm × 330.5 cm (88.3 in × 130.1 in)
- Location: National Gallery of Art, Washington, D.C.
- Accession: 1965.13.1

Daniel in the Lions' Den is an oil painting by the Flemish artist Peter Paul Rubens, a pioneer of Baroque art. Painted around 1615, it depicts the biblical story of Daniel in the lions' den in the Book of Daniel, in which Daniel, a Jewish prophet, is cast into a den of lions for defying a royal decree that prohibited praying to anyone but king Darius the Mede. Daniel's miraculous survival is owed to his piety to God. The painting's classical elements and verisimilitude indicate the influence of Rubens' time in Italy; the lions are life-size and contribute to its dramatic impact. The figure of Daniel, influenced by classical sculptures and Italian Renaissance painting, is depicted as a young man, despite biblical chronology suggesting he was much older.

Rubens' original intent for Daniel in the Lions' Den is unknown, though modern commentators suggest it was a political allegory or motivated by Counter-Reformation beliefs about personal faith, allowing viewers to visualize Daniel's suffering. The painting was initially owned by Dudley Carleton, 1st Viscount Dorchester. It was later presented to King Charles I of England, who displayed it in the Bear Gallery at the Palace of Whitehall. Over the centuries, the painting changed hands multiple times and was misattributed to Rubens' collaborators Paul de Vos and Jacob Jordaens before its true identity was rediscovered. It was eventually made part of the Hamilton Palace collection in Scotland before being sold to the National Gallery of Art of Washington, D.C. in 1965.

== Description ==
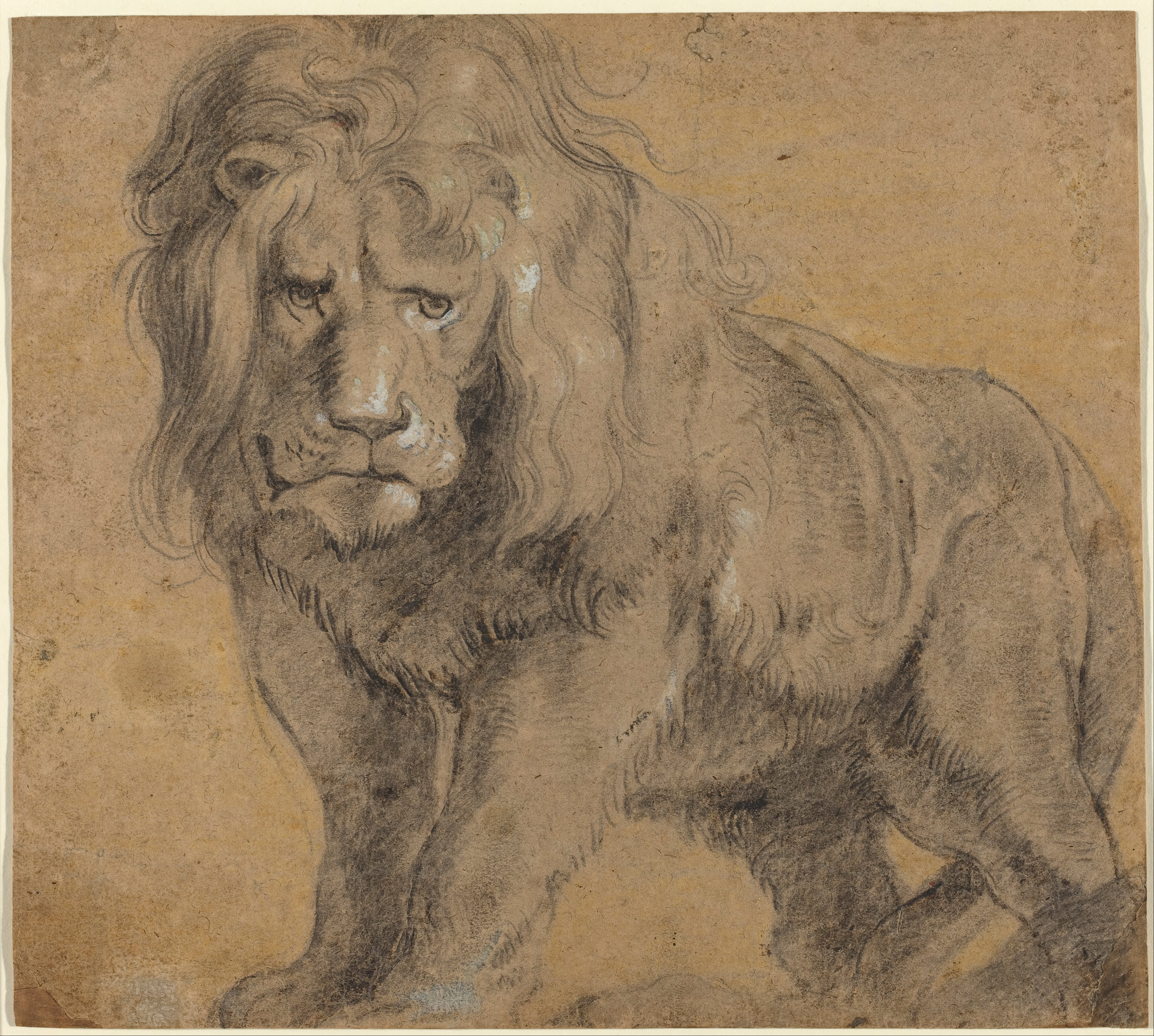
Sketch of a lion by Rubens

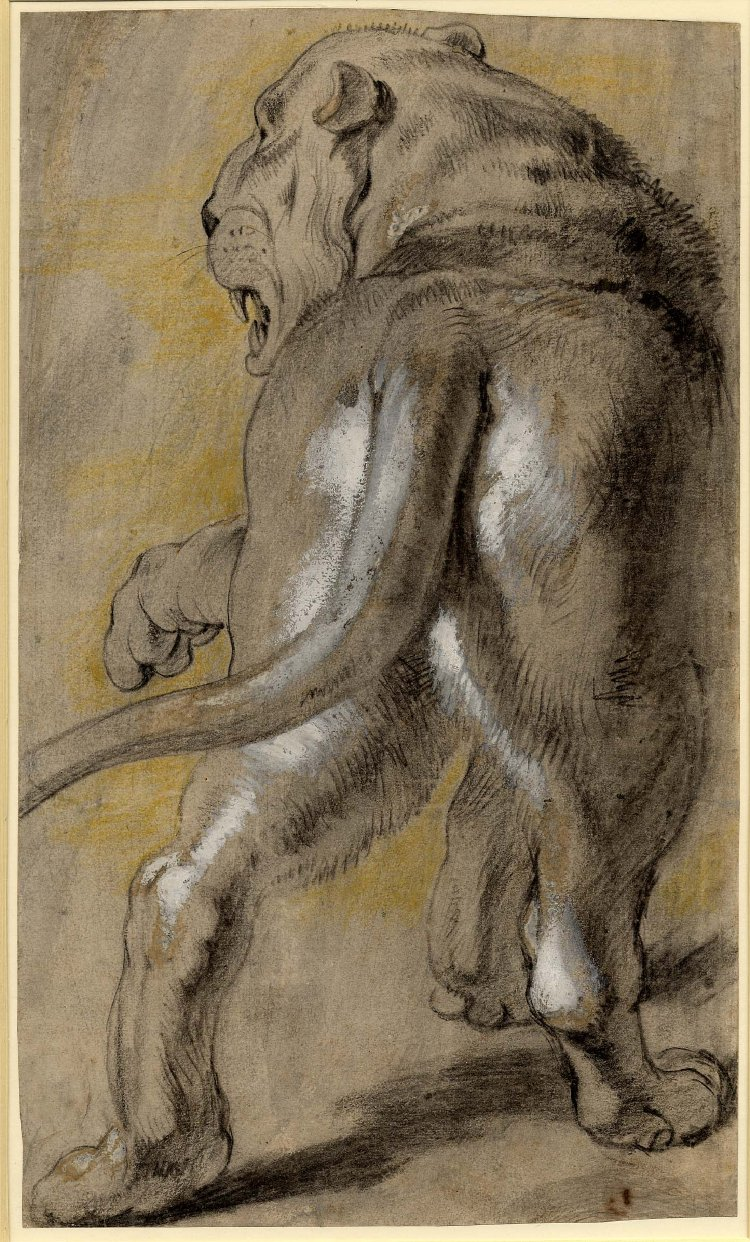
Rubens' sketch of the Paduan bronze lioness

Daniel in the Lion's Den is approximately 224.2 in × 330.5 in (5,690 mm × 8,390 mm) and is painted in [oil on canvas. According to the National Gallery of Art, it combines "realism and theatricality" to draw a "strong emotional reaction". Several of the lions in the painting seem to stare directly at the viewer, which can make the viewer feel that they are invading the lions' space, just as Daniel is doing. The lions were painted life-size to heighten their immediate menace.

Rubens may have based the lioness on a Renaissance bronze sculpture from Padua, but he stated in his letter to Carleton that the lions were "done from life". Rubens had access to exotic animals due to his role as a court painter for Albert VII, Archduke of Austria and Isabella Clara Eugenia in Brussels. He would have had direct access to the royal menagerie, where the archdukes kept exotic animals, including lions. Dutch painter Jacob Campo Weyerman recounted an occasion in Ruben's studio when Rubens tickled a lion to make it open its mouth and provide the right expression to be studied. There is possibility that Rubens studied two live lions in Ghent, called Flandria and Brabantia. The lions in the painting may be a Moroccan subspecies which was already extinct in the wild at the time of its creation.

The painting shows Daniel as a young man. However, according to Biblical chronology, Daniel would have been over eighty years old at the time of the narrative. Although Rubens depicts Daniel praying, this detail is not included in the Book of Daniel, chapter 6, but is mentioned in the deuterocanonical chapter 14.

== Background ==
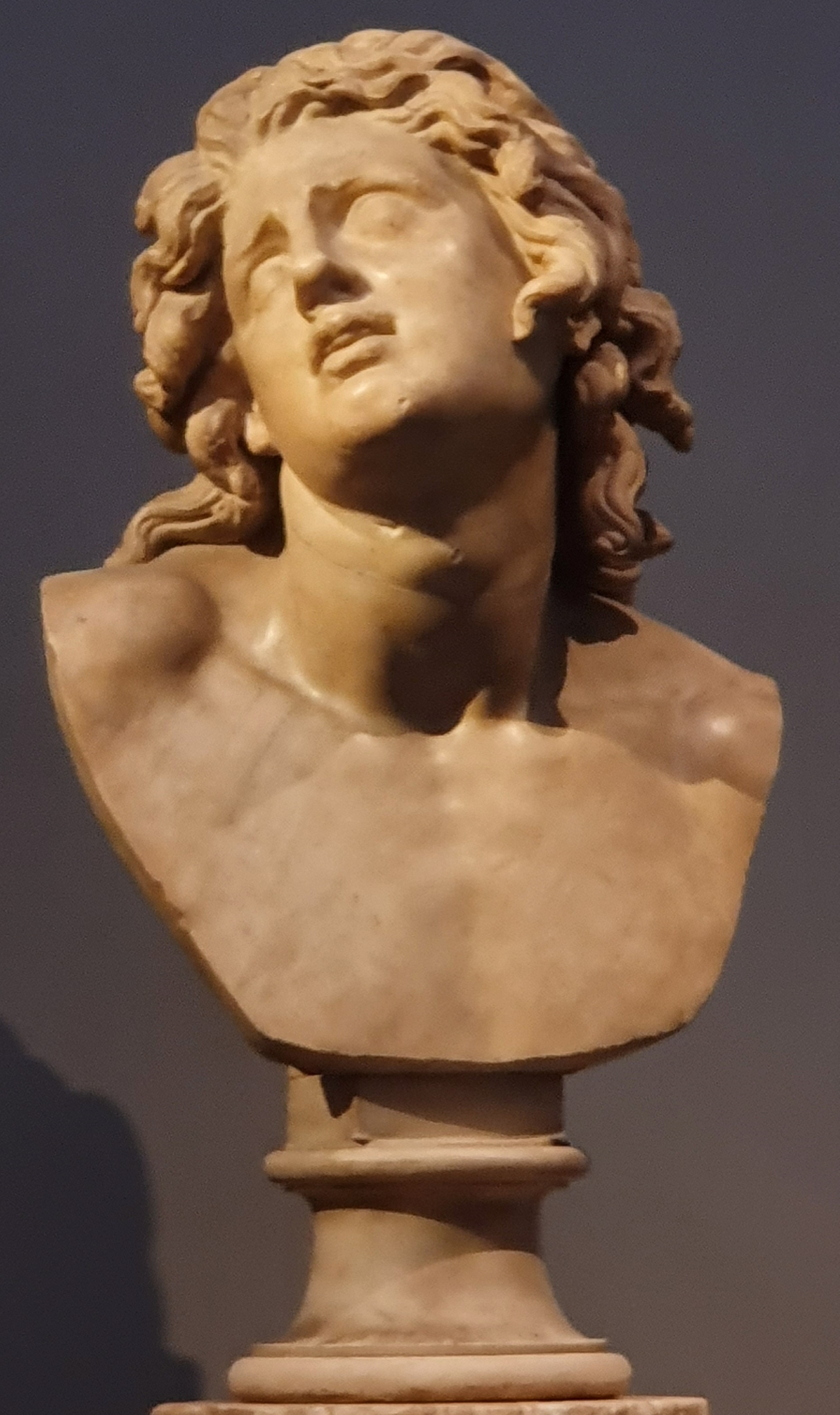
The Dying Alexander, a classical sculpture likely used as inspiration for the figure of Daniel

The Flemish artist Peter Paul Rubens was born in Siegen, Nassau, to Jan Rubens and Maria Pypelincks. He was converted to Catholicism shortly before his father's death in 1587 and raised from the age of 10 as a Catholic, due to the threat from Magistrate of Cologne to expel every Protestant from the city. The painting's materials and techniques are typical of Flemish artists from the late 16th and early 17th centuries. The constructive method and technique evident in this painting resemble those of Leonardo, Titian, Palma Vecchio, Tintoretto, Andrea del Sarto, Veronese, and some painters from Bolognese School. Daniel in the Lions' Den was created after Rubens had returned to Antwerp from Italy at the start of the Twelve Years' Truce in 1609. Rubens had spent eight years in Italy, supported by commissions from the Duke of Mantua. During this time, he was also deeply influenced by sculptures by Raphael, Leonardo da Vinci, Michelangelo, Correggio, Tintoretto, Caravaggio, and Annibale Carracci. The expression on Daniel's face may show this influence, as it is similar to those on the sculpture of the Dying Alexander and The Penitent Saint Jerome by Girolamo Muziano; Rubens would have encountered both of these works while in Italy.

The painting may have been started in 1612, but it is more often dated between 1613 and 1615. The reason why Rubens painted this piece, and for whom it was originally intended, is still unknown. Rachel Aviva Pollack, a researcher from the University of Maryland, suggests that this painting is a political allegory representing the situation during the Twelve Years' Truce, due to the inclusion of ten lions, the same number of provinces within the Southern Netherlands.

The painting portrays Daniel, a central figure in the Book of Daniel. He was a noble young man from Jerusalem who was taken captive by Nebuchadnezzar II. Despite his exile, Daniel rose to prominence in the Babylonian court, serving the king and his successors with wisdom and integrity, staying faithful to Yahweh until the Persian conquest led by Cyrus the Great. The painting depicts Daniel while in the lions' den, having been sentenced there by Darius the Mede for defying a royal decree that forbade praying to any god or man but the king.

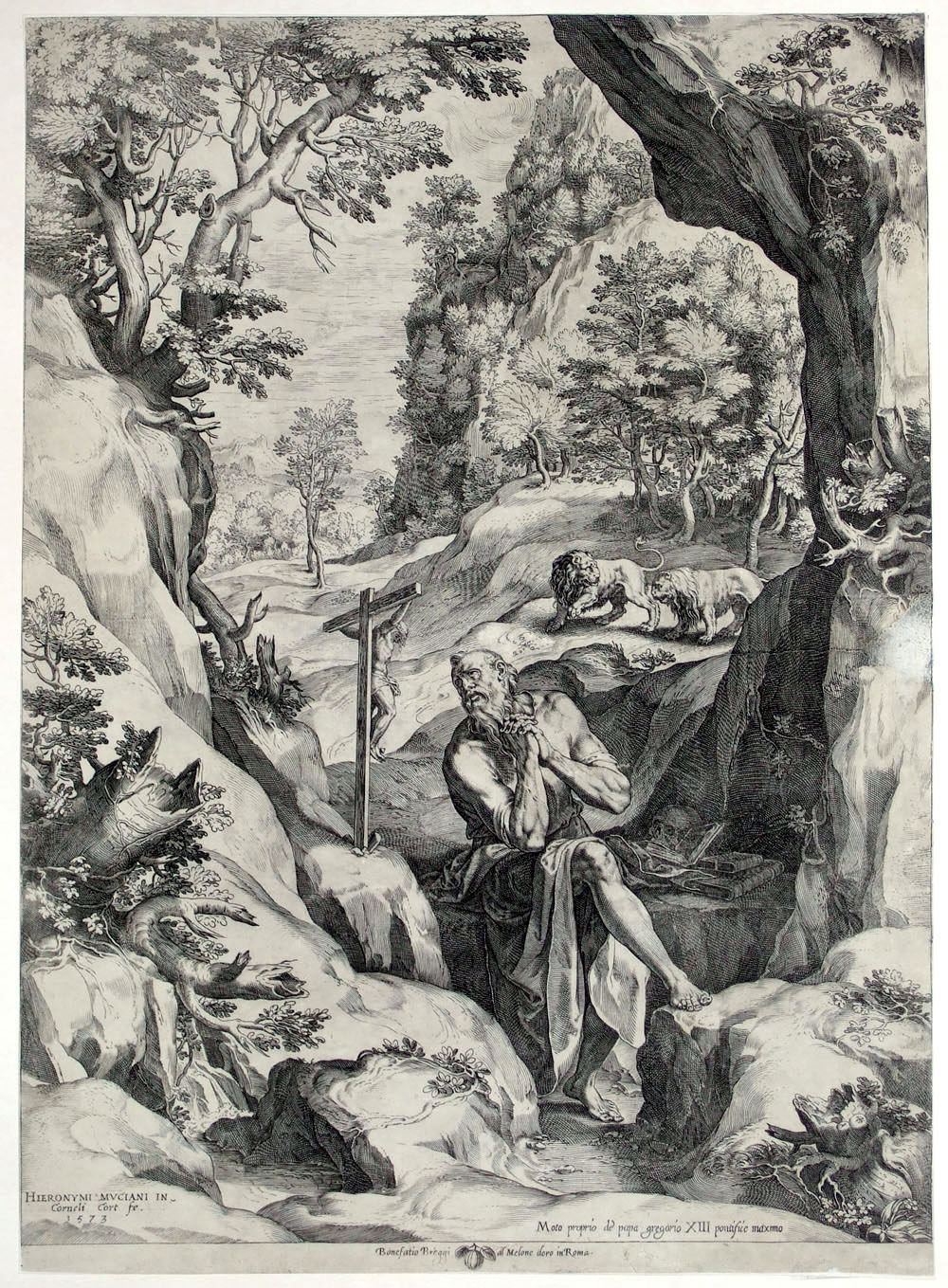
Painting of Jerome that became inspiration for the seated position, Cornelis Cort, Girolomo Muziano, Saint Jerome Penitent in the Wilderness (undated), Tartu University Library

== Provenance ==
The painting's first known owner was Dudley Carleton 1st Viscount Dorchester. Carleton was the ambassador for the English king James I in The Hague, and like the king, was an admirer of fine art. Rubens and Carleton met in September 1616 after Carleton had been promoted from his former ambassadorship in Venice. There he encountered his old acquaintances Tobie Matthew and George Gage, who went with Carleton to Antwerp, where he visited artists' studios, including Rubens's. Carleton decided to purchase The Wolf and Fox Hunt with help from Matthew, Gage and the English diplomat William Trumbull, but negotiations fell through when Rubens instead sold the painting to the Duke of Aarschot. Rubens agreed to paint a smaller version for Carleton in exchange for a chain of diamonds.

Rubens said in correspondence with Carleton that he had "repurchased" the painting, suggesting that it may have also been sold to an unknown buyer before this point. Rubens negotiated with Carleton to sell the painting to him together with works by his assistants, possibly including some painted by Jan Brueghel the Elder, in exchange for antique statues. Initially, Rubens offered 23 paintings, but Carleton only wanted those painted entirely by Rubens, including Prometheus Bound, as well as 3,000 guilders' worth of tapestries. Rubens negotiated to include more paintings for Carleton in exchange for an additional 1,000 guilders. They settled at that price, and Rubens exchanged his paintings and 2,000 guilders for the statues. Rubens saw this deal as a loss, with Carleton as the winner. This negotiation was recorded in a letter to Carleton on 28 April 1618.

In 1628, Carleton presented the painting to Charles I of England in order to advance his career as Secretary of State. The painting was displayed in the Bear Gallery at the Palace of Whitehall from around 1628 to 1641, in the formal reception area leading to Charles' private chambers, as a symbol of his royal authority. The painting was hung alongside Minerva Protecting Peace from Mars, which Rubens had gifted to Charles during his diplomatic mission to London between May 1629 and March 1630.

Charles I gave the painting to his first cousin, James Hamilton, 1st Duke of Hamilton. The painting likely served as a symbol of Hamilton's authority as the King's representative in Scotland during the Bishops' Wars. It remained at Hamilton Palace in Scotland until 1882, when it was part of the Hamilton Palace sale that was held at Christie, Manson & Woods on the first day, 17 June 1882. The painting was bought for £3,145 by a man named Duncan, who bought the work for the British politician Christopher Beckett Denison. Denison was Member of Parliament from Conservative Party for Eastern West Riding of Yorkshire from 1868 - 1880. This sale took place during the lifetime of William Douglas-Hamilton, 12th Duke of Hamilton.

In 1885, the painting was bought back by the Hamilton family from Denison, at a cost of £2,100. The painting was then inherited by Alfred Douglas-Hamilton, 13th Duke of Hamilton and was included again in the second Hamilton Palace sale in 1919. In this sale, the painting was sold for £2,520. It was purchased for Weetman Pearson, 1st Viscount Cowdray. The painting was inherited multiple times until it came to Harold Pearson, 2nd Viscount Cowdray, and then to his son, John Pearson, 3rd Viscount Cowdray. It was sold in 1963.

The Cowdray family believed the work in their possession was a copy. Concerned by its size and by the frame, they took it to Bonhams, who misattributed it as a work by Paul de Vos and Jacob Jordaens (the "stumpy legs" in the Daniel figure was thought to be characteristic of the artists' style). The New York art dealer Julius H. Weitzner, saw a photograph of the painting before the catalog was published. He immediately offered $1,400 to Bonhams, which they accepted, and the painting was taken off the auction. When the catalog was released, other dealers recognized it as a missing work by Rubens. An attempt was made to prevent the export license from being granted, but the painting was already in transit to New York. In December 1965, Weitzner sold the painting for over $400,000. It was sold by M. Knoedler to National Gallery of Art in Washington D.C. on 13 December 1965, where it now hangs.

== Exhibition history ==
Daniel in the Lions' Den was exhibited in London at the 1873 Royal Academy of Arts Winter Exhibition of 1873, where it was listed as no. 131 among the works of Old Masters. Lent by James Hamilton, it was placed in the main exhibition room. The painting was exhibited again during the Exhibition of pictures by masters of the Flemish and British schools, including a selection from the works of Sir Peter Paul Rubens where it was listed as no. 145. It was hung in the New Gallery from 1899 till 1900, lent by the trustees of James Hamilton.

After being bought by the National Gallery of Art, the painting was exhibited there at In Memoria, Ailsa Mellon Bruce in 1969. It was shown in the 2019 Early Rubens in the Legion of Honor, and was reproduced in for an exhibition that year in the Art Gallery of Ontario for partnership with Fine Arts Museums of San Francisco.

== Sources ==
- Boice, James Montgomery (2006). Daniel: An Expositional Commentary. Baker Books.
- Logan, Anne-Marie S.; Rubens, Peter Paul; Plomp, Michiel; N.Y.), Metropolitan Museum of Art (New York) (2005). Peter Paul Rubens: The Drawings. Metropolitan Museum of Art. ISBN 978-0-300-10494-3.
- Wheelock, Arthur K. (2005). Flemish Paintings of the Seventeenth Century. National Gallery of Art. ISBN 978-0-89468-348-0.
