= Joshua Fielden =

Joshua Fielden may refer to:

- Joshua Fielden (cotton manufacturer) (1748–1811), founder of the cotton spinning business Fielden Brothers of Todmorden, Yorkshire, father of John Fielden
- Joshua Fielden (politician) (1826–1887), grandson of the above and MP for the Eastern Division of the West Riding of Yorkshire
