= Christopher Beckett =

Christopher Beckett may be:

- Chris Beckett (born 1955), British writer, social worker, and academic
- Christopher Beckett, 4th Baron Grimthorpe (1915–2003), British soldier and company director

== See also ==
- Christopher Beckett Denison (1825–1884), British colonial administrator and Conservative politician
