= Andrew Fairbairn (politician) =

British politician (1828–1901)

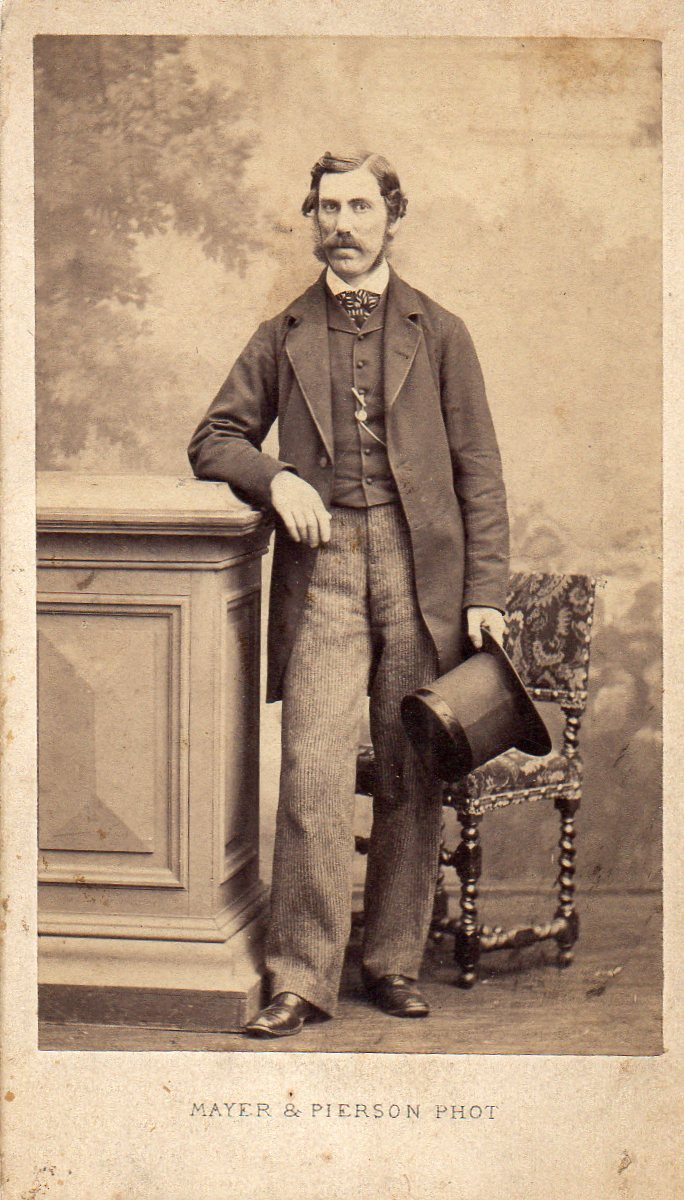
Andrew Fairbairn, British Liberal Politician (1828-1901)

Sir Andrew Fairbairn (5 March 1828 – 30 May 1901) was a British Liberal politician.

Fairbairn was born in Glasgow, the son of Sir Peter Fairbairn, of Woodsley House, Leeds and his wife Margaret Kennedy and educated at Geneva, at Glasgow, and at Peterhouse, Cambridge. He was called to the bar at Inner Temple in 1852.

He became a captain in the Yorkshire Hussar Yeoman Cavalry and major in the 7th West Riding Rifle Volunteers. He was chairman of the engineering firm of Fairbairn, Naylor, Macpherson, & Co. of Leeds. He was Mayor of Leeds from 1866 to 1868 and chairman of Leeds School Board from 1871 to 1878. He was a member of Executive Committee of Leeds Exhibition of Fine Arts and a Royal Commissioner of the Paris Exhibition in 1868. He was a J.P and Deputy Lieutenant for the West Riding of Yorkshire and a J.P. for Leeds. He was knighted in 1868.

Fairbairn was elected at the 1880 general election as one of the two Members of Parliament (MP) for Eastern West Riding of Yorkshire. When that constituency was divided at the 1885 general election, he was elected for the new Otley constituency. When the Liberals split over Irish Home Rule, Fairbairn joined the breakaway Liberal Unionists, and was defeated at the 1886 general election by the Liberal party candidate. In 1892 he served as High Sheriff of Yorkshire

Sir Andrew lived at Goldsborough Hall, near Knaresborough during the 1870s, leased from the Lascelles family of Harewood House and built Askham Grange in 1886 as his country house. Askham Grange in Askham Richard, near York is now a women's open category prison. He married Clara Loraine, daughter of Sir John Lambton Loraine Bt and had no children.

Parliament of the United Kingdom
Preceded by Christopher Beckett Denison; Joshua Fielden	Member of Parliament for Eastern West Riding of Yorkshire; 1880 – 1885; With: Sir John Ramsden, Bt.	Constituency abolished see Barkston Ash, Osgoldcross, Otley, Pudsey, Ripon and Spen Valley
New constituency see Eastern West Riding of Yorkshire	Member of Parliament for Otley; 1885 – 1886	Succeeded by Sir John Barran, Bt.
