= Nutfield Marshes =

Nature reserve in Surrey, England

Coordinates: 51.246°N 0.152°W

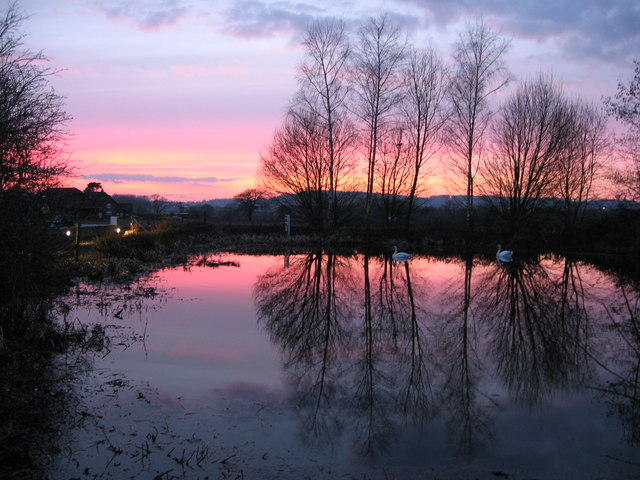
- Interactive map of Nutfield Marshes
- Type: Nature reserve
- Location: Nutfield, Surrey
- OS grid: TQ291513; TQ 307524
- Area: 62 hectares (150 acres)
- Manager: Surrey Wildlife Trust

Nutfield Marshes is a 62-hectare (150-acre) nature reserve near Nutfield in Surrey. It is managed by the Surrey Wildlife Trust.

These former sand quarries along the Redhill Brook are now wetland nature reserves called The Moors, Spynes Mere, and Holmethorpe Lagoons. They provide habitats for many birds, with 144 species recorded in Holmethorp Lagoon. Spynes Mere has three lakes.

In 2021, the trust constructed a 400 t (440-ton) 20 m-long (66 ft) sandbank at Spynes Mere, to encourage sand martins to nest at the site.

There is public access to the site apart from The Moors.
