= Michael Maw =

English cricketer and Royal Air Force officer

Personal information
- Full name: Michael Trentham Maw
- Born: 29 September 1912; Nutfield, Surrey, England
- Died: 13 August 1944 (aged 31) near Alzey, People's State of Hesse, Nazi Germany
- Batting: Right-handed
- Bowling: Right-arm medium

Domestic team information
- Years: Team
- 1933–1934: Cambridge University

Career statistics
Competition	First-class
Matches	3
Runs scored	19
Batting average	6.33
100s/50s	–/–
Top score	9
Balls bowled	294
Wickets	3
Bowling average	47.00
5 wickets in innings	–
10 wickets in match	–
Best bowling	1/15
Catches/stumpings	–/–
- Source: Cricinfo, 26 July 2019

Michael Trentham Maw DFC (29 September 1912 – 13 August 1944) was an English first-class cricketer and Royal Air Force officer.

The son of Mowbray Maw and his wife, Mary, he was born in September 1912 at Nutfield, Surrey. He was educated at Oundle School, before going up to Christ's College, Cambridge to read engineering. While studying at Cambridge, he made his debut in first-class cricket for Cambridge University against Northamptonshire at Fenner's in 1933. He made a further first-class appearance for Cambridge in 1934, against Nottinghamshire. In the same season he played for H. D. G. Leveson Gower's XI against Oxford University at Reigate. While at Cambridge, he joined the Royal Air Force Reserve as a trainee pilot.

After graduating from Cambridge he became a director in the family chemist business Messrs S. Maw & Sons Ltd. Continuing in the Royal Air Force Reserve, he was promoted to the rank of flying officer in September 1933. Maw served in the Royal Air Force during the Second World War with 640 Squadron, undertaking training at Cranwell and Calgary. He was promoted to the rank of flight lieutenant in May 1941, before being granted the temporary rank of squadron leader in July 1943. Maw was killed while piloting a Halifax bomber during a raid over Frankfurt on 13 August 1944, having been shot down near Alzey. He was posthumously awarded the Distinguished Flying Cross in September 1944. His body was recovered and buried at the Reichswald Forest War Cemetery.
