= Hastings Duncan =

British politician

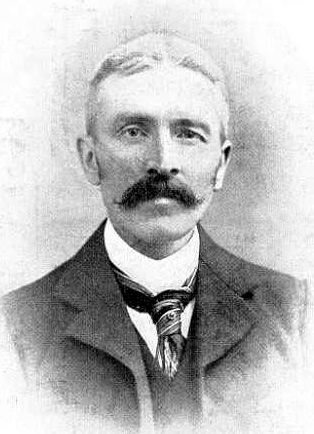
Hastings Duncan MP, circa 1900

Sir James Hastings Duncan (1 March 1855 – 31 July 1928) was a British Liberal Party politician.

He was elected at the 1900 general election as Member of Parliament (MP) for the Otley division of the West Riding of Yorkshire, regaining a seat which had been held by Liberals from 1885 until a narrow Conservative victory in 1895.

Duncan held the seat until the constituency was abolished in boundary changes for the 1918 general election, and did not stand for Parliament again.

He was knighted in 1914.

== Electoral record ==
General election Wednesday 10 October 1900 Electorate
| Party | Candidate | Votes | % | ±% |
|---|---|---|---|---|
| Liberal | James Hastings Duncan | 5,327 | 52.9 | |
| Conservative | Marmaduke D'Arcy Wyvill | 4,747 | 47.1 | |
| Majority | | 580 | 5.8 | |
| Turnout | | 11,397 | 78.2 | |
| Liberal gain from Conservative | | Swing | | |

1906 United Kingdom general election Electorate
| Party | Candidate | Votes | % | ±% |
|---|---|---|---|---|
| Liberal | James Hastings Duncan | 6,307 | | |
| Conservative | William Whittaker Thompson | 4,658 | | |
| Majority | | 1,649 | | |
| Turnout | | 10,965 | | |
| Liberal hold | | Swing | | |

January 1910 United Kingdom general election Electorate
| Party | Candidate | Votes | % | ±% |
|---|---|---|---|---|
| Liberal | James Hastings Duncan | 6,911 | | |
| Conservative | William Whittaker Thompson | 5,010 | | |
| Majority | | 1,901 | | |
| Turnout | | 11,921 | | |
| Liberal hold | | Swing | | |

December 1910 United Kingdom general election Electorate
| Party | Candidate | Votes | % | ±% |
|---|---|---|---|---|
| Liberal | James Hastings Duncan | 6,151 | | |
| Conservative | William Whittaker Thompson | 4,892 | | |
| Majority | | 1259 | | |
| Turnout | | 11,143 | | |
| Liberal hold | | Swing | | |

Parliament of the United Kingdom
| Preceded by Marmaduke Wyvill | Member of Parliament for Otley; 1900 – 1918 | Constituency abolished |
