= Otley (constituency) =

Parliamentary constituency in the United Kingdom, 1885–1918

- Former borough constituency for the House of Commons

1885–1918
- Seats: one
- Created from: Eastern West Riding of Yorkshire
- Replaced by: Keighley, Pudsey and Otley, Shipley and Skipton

Otley was a parliamentary constituency between 1885 and 1918 centred on the town of Otley, then in the West Riding of Yorkshire and now in West Yorkshire. It returned one Member of Parliament (MP) to the House of Commons of the Parliament of the United Kingdom, elected by the first past the post system.

== History ==
The constituency was created when the two-member Eastern West Riding of Yorkshire was divided by the Redistribution of Seats Act 1885 for the 1885 general election in six new single-member constituencies. It was abolished for the 1918 general election, when it was largely replaced by the new Pudsey & Otley constituency.

== Boundaries ==
The Redistribution of Seats Act 1885 provided that the constituency was to consist of-

- the Sessional Division of Otley and
- the Parishes of Beamsley in Addingham, Beamsley in Skipton, Bingley and Micklethwaite, Hazlewood with Storiths, Morton, and Nesfield with Langbar.

== Members of Parliament ==
Year	Member	Party
1885	Sir Andrew Fairbairn	Liberal
1886	John Barran	Liberal
1895	Marmaduke Wyvill	Conservative
1900	Hastings Duncan	Liberal
1918	constituency abolished	

== Elections ==
=== Elections in the 1880s ===
Frederick Fison

General election 1885: Otley
Party	Candidate	Votes	%	±%
Liberal	Andrew Fairbairn	5,050	58.1	
Conservative	Frederick Fison	3,643	41.9	
Majority		1,407	16.2	
Turnout		8,693	88.0	
Registered electors		9,883		
Liberal win (new seat)				

General election 1886: Otley
Party	Candidate	Votes	%	±%
Liberal	John Barran	4,245	55.8	−2.3
Liberal Unionist	Andrew Fairbairn	3,361	44.2	+2.3
Majority		884	11.6	−4.6
Turnout		7,606	77.0	−11.0
Registered electors		9,883		
Liberal hold		Swing	−2.3	

=== Elections in the 1890s ===
General election 1892: Otley
Party	Candidate	Votes	%	±%
Liberal	John Barran	4,713	53.9	−1.9
Conservative	Marmaduke Wyvill	4,023	46.1	+1.9
Majority		690	7.8	−3.8
Turnout		8,736	75.6	−1.4
Registered electors		11,557		
Liberal hold		Swing	−1.9	

M.D. Wyvill

General election 1895: Otley
Party	Candidate	Votes	%	±%
Conservative	Marmaduke Wyvill	4,670	50.3	+4.2
Liberal	John Barran	4,622	49.7	−4.2
Majority		48	0.6	N/A
Turnout		9,292	84.2	+8.6
Registered electors		11,038		
Conservative gain from Liberal		Swing	+4.2	

=== Elections in the 1900s ===
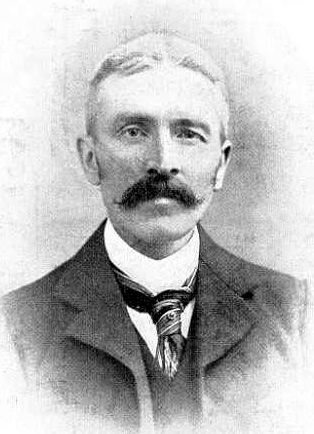
Hastings Duncan

General election 1900: Otley
Party	Candidate	Votes	%	±%
Liberal	James Duncan	5,327	52.9	+3.2
Conservative	Marmaduke Wyvill	4,747	47.1	−3.2
Majority		580	5.8	N/A
Turnout		10,074	83.0	−1.2
Registered electors		12,138		
Liberal gain from Conservative		Swing	+3.2	

General election 1906: Otley
Party	Candidate	Votes	%	±%
Liberal	James Duncan	6,307	57.5	+4.6
Conservative	William Whittaker Thompson	4,658	42.5	−4.6
Majority		1,649	15.0	+9.2
Turnout		10,965	86.5	+3.5
Registered electors		12,670		
Liberal hold		Swing	+4.6	

=== Elections in the 1910s ===
General election January 1910: Otley
Party	Candidate	Votes	%	±%
Liberal	James Duncan	6,911	58.0	+0.5
Conservative	William Whittaker Thompson	5,010	42.0	−0.5
Majority		1,901	16.0	+1.0
Turnout		11,921	89.0	+2.5
Registered electors		13,397		
Liberal hold		Swing	+0.5	

General election December 1910: Otley
Party	Candidate	Votes	%	±%
Liberal	James Duncan	6,151	55.7	−2.3
Conservative	William Whittaker Thompson	4,892	44.3	+2.3
Majority		1,259	82.4	−4.6
Turnout		11,143	82.4	−6.6
Registered electors		13,397		
Liberal hold		Swing	−2.3	

General Election 1914–15:

Another General Election was required to take place before the end of 1915. The political parties had been making preparations for an election to take place and by July 1914, the following candidates had been selected;

- Liberal: James Duncan
- Unionist:
