= Daniel in the lions' den =

Story in the Book of Daniel in the Hebrew Bible

Daniel in the Lions' Den

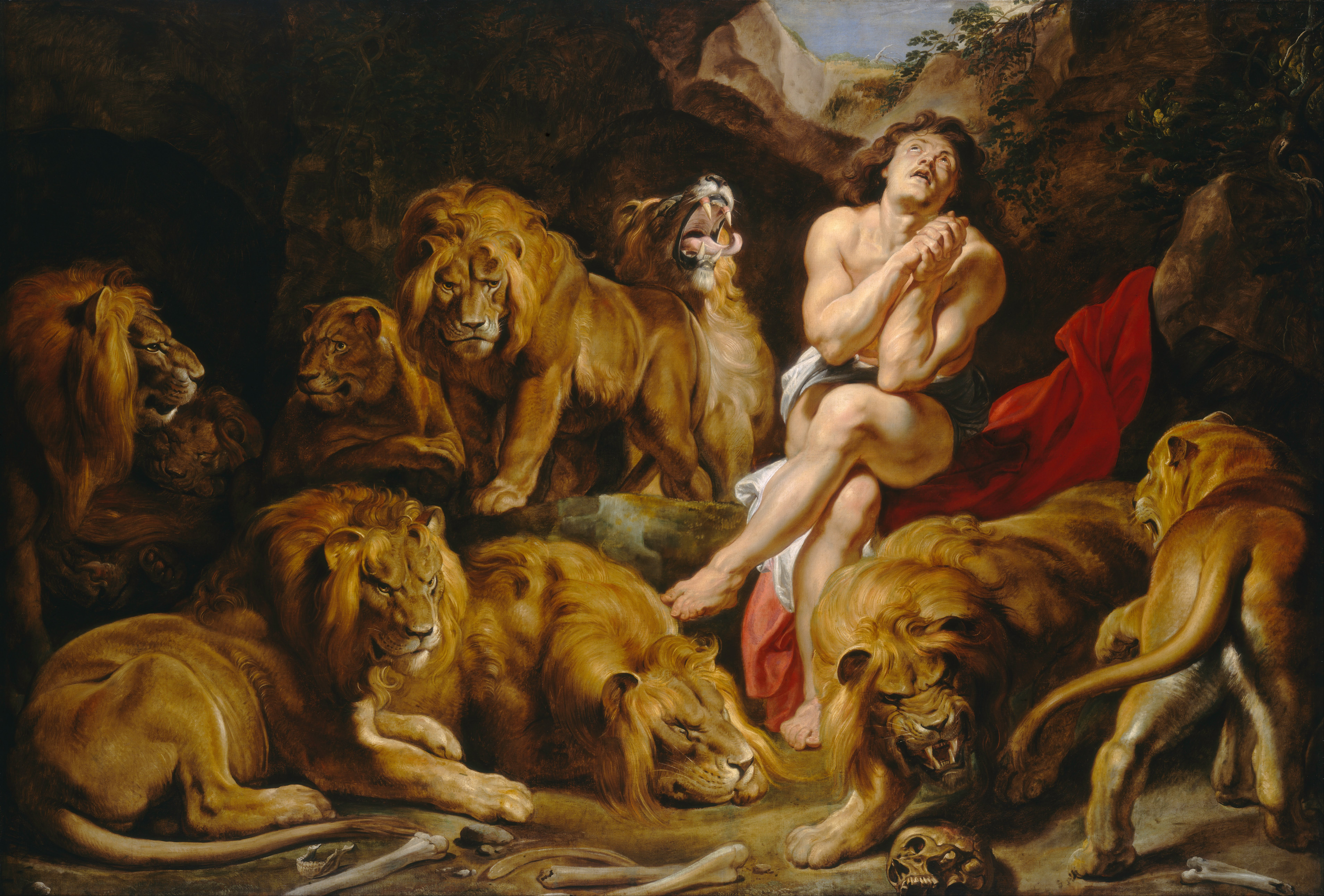
Peter Paul Rubens, c. 1615

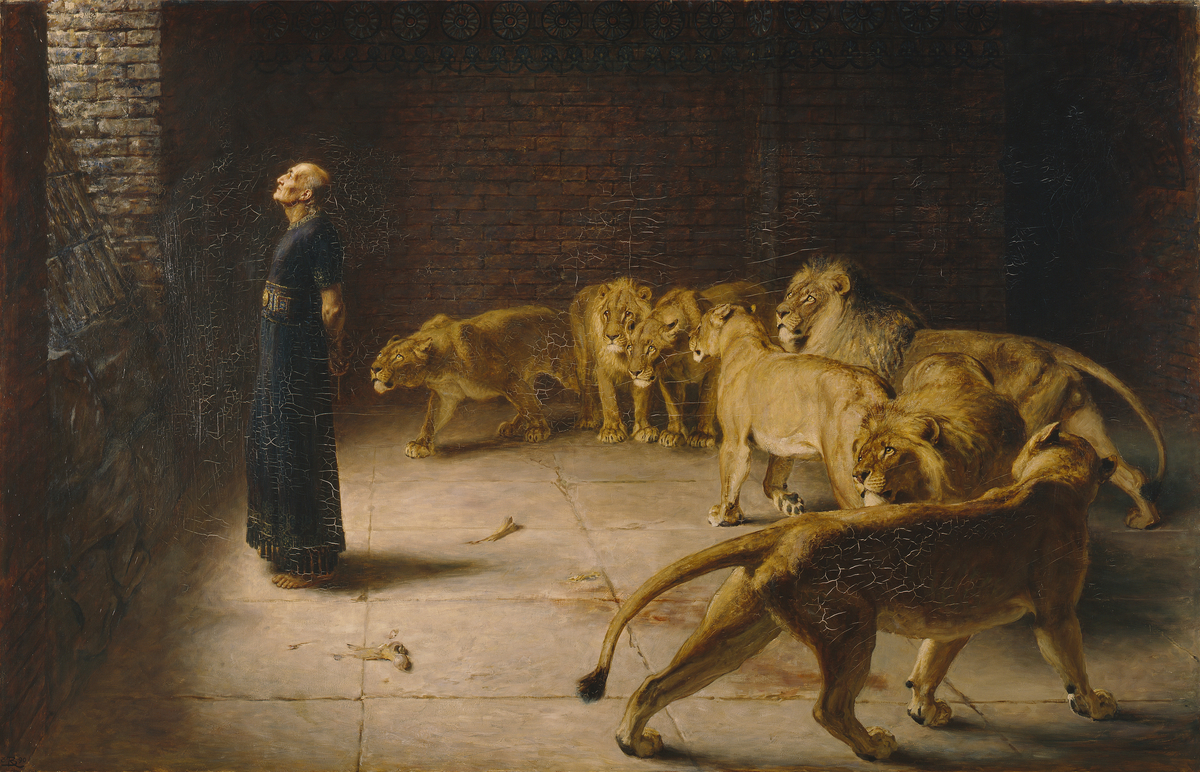
Briton Rivière, 1890

Although Peter Paul Rubens' depiction shows Daniel as a young man (top), Daniel would have been over eighty years old at the time of this incident, making Briton Rivière's picture (bottom) more accurate.

Daniel in the Lions' Den is a story found in chapter 6 of the Book of Daniel. It tells of how the biblical Daniel is saved from lions by God "because [he] was found blameless before Him" (Daniel 6:22). It parallels and complements chapter 3, the story of Shadrach, Meshach, and Abednego: each beginning with the jealousy of pagans directed towards Israelites who had not forfeited their faith in God for the worship of idols like all the others followed by an imperial edict requiring them to compromise their religion, and concludes with divine deliverance and a king who confesses the greatness of the God of the Israelites and issues an edict of royal protection. The tales making up chapters 1–6 of Daniel date no earlier than the Hellenistic period, and might date earlier to the Persian period after the Babylonian captivity (5th to 2nd century BC) and were probably originally independent, but were collected in the mid-2nd century BC and expanded shortly afterwards with the visions of the later chapters to produce the modern book.

== Summary of the biblical narrative ==
In Daniel 6, Daniel is raised to high office by his royal master Darius the Mede. Daniel's jealous rivals trick Darius into issuing a decree that, for thirty days, no prayers should be addressed to any god or man but Darius himself; anyone who disobeys this edict is to be thrown to the lions. Pious Daniel continues to pray daily to the God of Israel; and the king, although deeply distressed, must condemn Daniel to death, for the edicts of the Medes and Persians cannot be altered. Hoping for Daniel's deliverance, Darius has him cast into the pit. At daybreak, the king hurries to the place and cries out anxiously, asking if God had saved his friend. Daniel replies that his God had sent an angel to close the jaws of the lions, "because I was found blameless before him". The king commands that those who had conspired against Daniel be thrown to the lions in his place with their wives and children, and that the whole world should tremble and fear before the God of Daniel.

== Composition and structure ==
It is generally accepted that the Book of Daniel originated as a collection of folktales among the Babylonian captivity, the Jewish community living in Babylon and Mesopotamia, in the Persian and Hellenistic periods (5th to 2nd centuries BC). Chapters 4–6, which includes the tale of Daniel in the lions' den, may belong to the earliest stage, as these differ quite markedly in the oldest texts. Although the entire book is traditionally ascribed to Daniel the seer, the tales of chapters 1–6, including the story of the lion's den, are the voice of an anonymous narrator (except for chapter 4 which is in the form of a letter from king Nebuchadnezzar). It is possible that the name of Daniel was chosen for the hero because of his reputation as a wise seer in Hebrew tradition.

Chapters 2–7 are in Aramaic, and are in the clear form of a chiasm (a poetic structure in which the main point or message of a passage is placed in the centre and framed by further repetitions on either side):

- A. (2:4b-49) – A dream of four kingdoms replaced by a fifth
  - B. (3:1–30) – Daniel's three friends in the fiery furnace
    - C. (4:1–37) – Daniel interprets a dream for Nebuchadnezzar
    - C'. (5:1–31) – Daniel interprets the handwriting on the wall for Belshazzar
  - B'. (6:1–28) – Daniel in the lions' den
- A'. (7:1–28) – A vision of four world kingdoms replaced by a fifth

The story of Daniel in the lions' den in chapter 6 is paired with the story of Shadrach, Meshach, and Abednego and the "fiery furnace" in Daniel 3. The parallels include the jealousy of non-Jews, an imperial edict requiring Jews to compromise their religion on pain of death, and divine deliverance. Each story climaxes with the king confessing the greatness of the God of the Jews and issuing an edict of royal protection. In each case, life is preserved through divine presence in the fire or the pit.

The structure of Daniel 6 itself is also in the form of a chiasm:

A. Introduction: Daniel’s success (vv.1–3)

B. Darius’s edict and Daniel’s response (vv.4–10)

C. Daniel’s opponents plot his death (vv.11–15)

D. Darius hopes for Daniel’s deliverance (vv.16–18)
D'. Darius witnesses Daniel’s deliverance (vv.19–23)

C'. Daniel’s opponents sentenced to death (v.24)

B'. Darius’s edict and doxology (v.25–27)

A'. Conclusion: Daniel’s success (v.28)

== Rabbinic literature ==
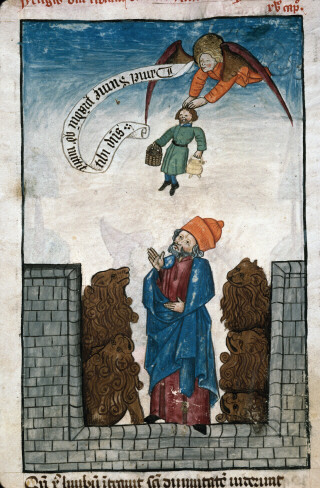
Daniel in the lions' den saved by Habakkuk, as described in rabbinic literature (France, 15th century).

According to Josippon, "the beasts in the den received Daniel as faithful dogs might receive their returning master, wagging their tails and licking him". The Midrash Tehillim says that "the mouth of the den was closed with a huge stone, which had rolled of itself from Israel to Babylon for that purpose" and that "upon this stone sat an angel in the shape of a lion, so that Daniel's enemies might not harass him."

== Artistic representations ==
=== In visual arts ===
Although Daniel is sometimes depicted as a young man in illustrations of the incident, James Montgomery Boice points out that he would have been over eighty years old at the time. The topic of Daniel in the lions' den has a long history of artistic representation; one of the eras in which it played an important role was the Early Christian art.

Later Painters who have depicted this incident include:

- Jan Brueghel the Younger, Daniel in the Lions' Den
- Briton Rivière, Daniel's Answer to the King
- Peter Paul Rubens, Daniel in the Lions' Den
- Henry Ossawa Tanner, Daniel in the Lions' Den
- David Teniers the Younger, Daniel in the Lions' Den

=== In music ===
- In February 1927, the Norfolk Jubilee Quartette recorded "Daniel in the Lions' Den" on the Paramount label. The song bears close melodic and lyrical resemblance to "Now is the Needed Time," recorded (without reference to Daniel and the lions) in the 1950s by Lightnin' Hopkins.
- The 1929 gospel blues song "I've Got the Key to the Kingdom" by Washington Phillips retells the story.
- On February 10, 1959, in Cincinnati, the Stanley Brothers recorded "Daniel Prayed", a bluegrass retelling of the story. Originally issued on King LP 645, the song has also been recorded by many bluegrass country and gospel artists and groups such as Doc Watson, Boone Creek, The Isaacs, Ricky Skaggs. The Cathedrals and The Gospel Plow Boys.
- The 1964 Broadway Musical Fiddler on the Roof by Jerry Bock and Sheldon Harnick includes a song called "Miracle of Miracles", in which Motel, the tailor, sings "Wonder of wonders; miracle of miracles; God took a Daniel once again, turned him around and, miracle of miracles, walked him through the lion's den."
- In 1966, the trio of Frederick McQueen, George McKenzie, and Shelton Swain released their own original song about the story, called "God Locked the Lion's Jaw," on the album The Real Bahamas (In Music And Song).
- Lyrics on the title track of Bob Marley & the Wailers' 1979 album Survival reference Daniel leaving the lion's den.
- The front sleeve of the 1981 album From the Lions Mouth by The Sound is the painting Daniel in the Lion’s Den by Briton Riviere.
- The 1982 song "Daniel" by Raffi on his Rise and Shine album.
- The 1982 song "Lion's Den" by Bruce Springsteen, first released on the 1998 album Tracks, alludes to the story.
- The 1988 song "I Call Your Name" by Johnny Clegg and Savuka includes the line 'I feel like Daniel in the lion's den'.
- Patty Loveless recorded the song "Daniel Prayed" featuring Ricky Skaggs for her 2001 album Mountain Soul album.
- The 2011 song "Us Against the World" by Coldplay includes the line 'My drunken hazard Daniel in a lion's den', as a reference to being in a bad place.
- The 2013 album Bad Blood by Bastille includes a track called "Daniel in the Den".
- The 2016 album Arts & Leisure by Walter Martin (formerly of The Walkmen) includes a track called "Daniel in the Lion's Den".
- Prog metal band Dream Theater recorded the track "Paralysed" on their 2019 album Distance Over Time which includes the line 'The victim, the martyr... like Daniel in the Lion's Den, time and time again'.

== In popular culture ==
- Daniel in the Lions' Den was adapted as a musical segment in the first episode of Veggietales titled 'Where's God When I'm S-Scared'?
- The song "Broken Heart," written by Esther Navarro and Jesse Powell and recorded in 1957 by The Cadillacs, mentions Daniel in the Lions' Den.
- In the Malcolm in the Middle episode "Day Care," Hal is forced to tell the story of Daniel in the Lions' Den at Sunday school when the teacher leaves the classroom, and subsequently botches the tale in a perverse and violent manner.

== See also ==
- Androcles and the Lion
- List of Hebrew Bible events
