= Daniel (biblical figure) =

Protagonist of the Book of Daniel of the Hebrew Bible

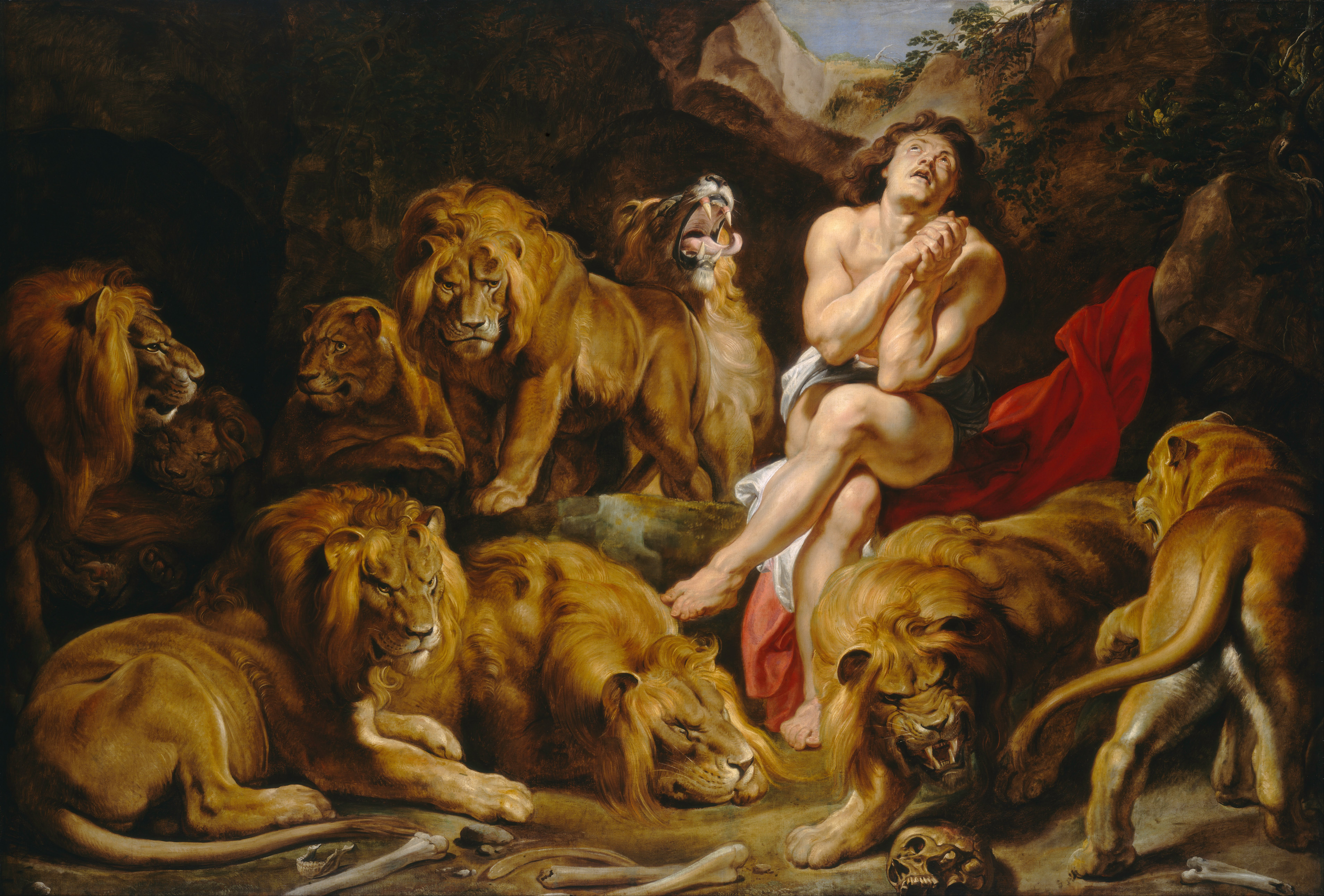
- Daniel in the Lions' Den (c. 1615) by Peter Paul Rubens

Prophet
- Venerated in: Judaism; Christianity; Islam; Baháʼí Faith
- Major shrine: Tomb of Daniel, Susa, Iran
- Feast: July 21: Roman Catholicism; December 17: Greek Orthodoxy; Tuesday after fourth Sunday of Pentecost: Armenian Apostolic Church
- Attributes: Often depicted in the den of the lions
- Tradition or genre: 6th century BCE

Daniel (Aramaic and Hebrew: דָּנִיֵּאל, romanized: Dānīyyēʾl, lit. 'God is my Judge'; (Note: In Dan. 6:22 only, the Aramaic name is דָּנִיֶּאל) Greek: Δανιήλ, romanized: Daniḗl; Arabic: دانيال, romanized: Dāniyāl) is the main character of the Book of Daniel. According to the Hebrew Bible, Daniel was a noble Jewish youth of Jerusalem taken into captivity by Nebuchadnezzar II of Babylon, serving the king and his successors with loyalty and ability until the time of the Persian conqueror Cyrus, all the while remaining true to the God of Israel. While some conservative scholars hold that Daniel existed and his book was written in the 6th century BCE, most scholars agree that Daniel, as depicted in the Book of Daniel, was not a historical figure, and that the character was probably based on a similar legendary Daniel from earlier traditions. It follows that much of the book is a cryptic allusion to the reign of the 2nd century BCE Hellenistic king Antiochus IV Epiphanes.

Six cities claim the Tomb of Daniel, the most famous being that in Susa, in southern Iran, at a site known as Shush-e Daniyal. He is not a prophet in Judaism, but the rabbis reckoned him to be the most distinguished member of the Babylonian diaspora, unsurpassed in piety and good deeds, firm in his adherence to the Law despite being surrounded by enemies who sought his ruin, and in the first few centuries CE they wrote down the many legends that had grown up around his name. He is considered a prophet in Christianity, and although he is not mentioned in the Quran, Muslim sources describe him as a prophet.

== Background ==
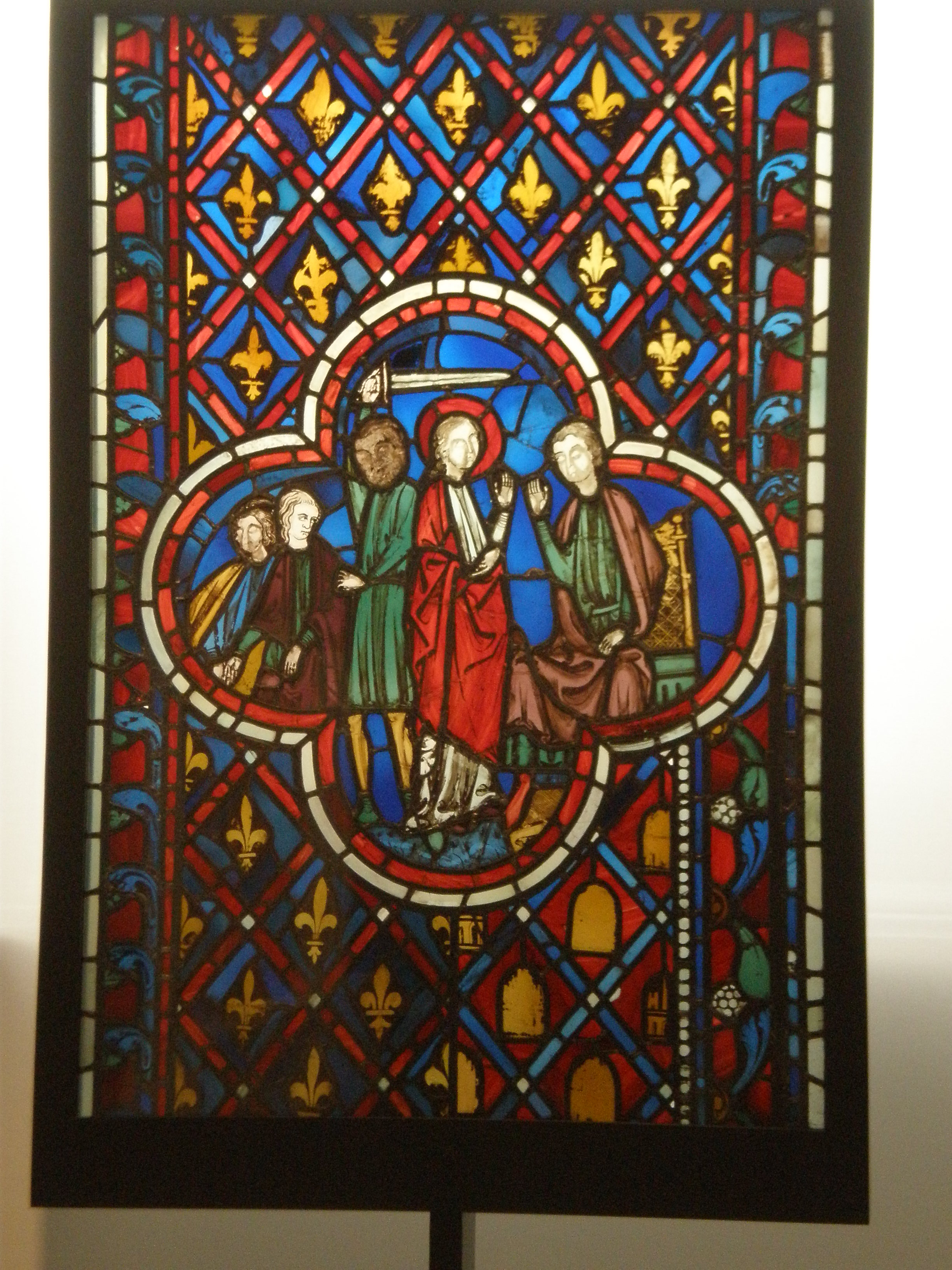
13th-century French depiction in stained glass of Daniel interceding with Arioch, commander of the king's guard, who was ordered to execute the Babylonian wise men after they were unable to interpret Nebuchadnezzar's dream.

Daniel's name means "God (El) is my judge". While the best known Daniel is the hero of the Book of Daniel who interprets dreams and receives apocalyptic visions, the Bible also briefly mentions three other individuals of this name:

1. The Book of Ezekiel (14:14, 14:20 and 28:3) refers to a legendary Daniel famed for wisdom and righteousness. In verse 14:14, Ezekiel says of the sinful land of Israel that "even if these three, Noah, Daniel and Job, were in it, they would deliver but their own lives by their righteousness." In chapter 28, Ezekiel taunts the king of Tyre, asking rhetorically, "art thou wiser than Daniel?" The author of the Book of Daniel appears to have taken this legendary figure, renowned for his wisdom, to serve as his central human character.
2. The Book of Ezra (8:2) mentions a priest named Daniel who went from Babylon to Jerusalem with Ezra.
3. The First Book of Chronicles (3:1) mentions a son of David called Daniel.

Daniel (Dn'il, or Danel) is also the name of a figure in the Aqhat legend from Ugarit. (Ugarit was a Canaanite city destroyed around 1200 BCE – the tablet containing the story is dated c. 1360 BCE.) This legendary Daniel is known for his righteousness and wisdom and a follower of the god El (hence his name), who made the god’s will known through dreams and visions. It is unlikely that Ezekiel knew the far older Canaanite legend, but it seems reasonable to suppose that some connection exists between the two. The authors of the tales in the first half of the Book of Daniel were likely also unaware of the Ugaritic Daniel and probably took the name of their hero from Ezekiel; the author of the visions in the second half in turn took his hero's name from the tales. Some scholars have suggested identifying the Daniel character in Ezekiel 28 with King David's son Daniel.

== Tales of Daniel ==
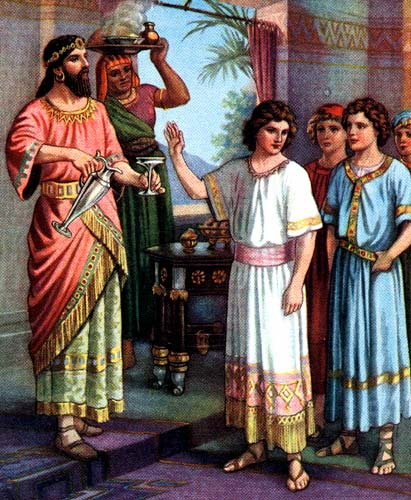
Daniel refusing to eat at the King's table (early 20th-century American illustration)

The Book of Daniel begins with an introduction telling how Daniel and his companions came to be in Babylon, followed by a set of tales set in the Babylonian and Persian courts in the late 7th and early 6th centuries BCE, followed in turn by a set of visions in which Daniel sees the remote future of the world and of Israel. The tales in chapters 1–6 can be dated to the 3rd or early 2nd centuries BCE; it is generally accepted that these were expanded by the addition of the visions in chapters 8–12 between 167 and 164 BCE.

In the third year of the reign of Jehoiakim, Daniel and his friends Hananiah, Mishael, and Azariah are taken to Babylon by Nebuchadnezzar, king of Babylon. The four are chosen for their intellect and beauty to be trained in the Babylonian court, and are given new names. Daniel is given the Babylonian name Belteshazzar (Akkadian: 𒊩𒆪𒈗𒋀, romanized: Beltu-šar-uṣur, written as NIN_{9}.LUGAL.ŠEŠ), while his companions are given the Babylonian names Shadrach, Meshach, and Abednego. Daniel and his friends refuse the food and wine provided by the king of Babylon to avoid becoming defiled. They receive wisdom from God and surpass "all the magicians and enchanters of the kingdom." Nebuchadnezzar dreams of a giant statue made of four metals with feet of mingled iron and clay, smashed by a stone from heaven. Only Daniel is able to interpret it: the dream signifies four kingdoms, of which Babylon is the first, but God will destroy them and replace them with his own kingdom.

Nebuchadnezzar dreams of a great tree that shelters all the world and of a heavenly figure who decrees that the tree will be destroyed; again, only Daniel can interpret the dream, which concerns the sovereignty of God over the kings of the earth. When Nebuchadnezzar's son Belshazzar uses consecrated vessels from the Jewish temple as serving vessels for his extravagant feast, a hand appears and writes a mysterious message on a wall, which only Daniel can interpret; it tells the king that his kingdom will be given to the Medes and Persians, because Belshazzar, unlike Nebuchadnezzar, has not acknowledged the sovereignty of the God of Daniel. The Medes and Persians overthrow Nebuchadnezzar and the new king, Darius the Mede, appoints Daniel to high authority. Jealous rivals attempt to destroy Daniel with an accusation that he worships God instead of the king, and Daniel is thrown into a den of lions, but an angel saves him, his accusers are destroyed, and Daniel is restored to his position.

In the third year of Darius, Daniel has a series of visions. In the first, four beasts come out of the sea, the last with ten horns, and an eleventh horn grows and achieves dominion over the Earth and the "Ancient of Days" (God) gives dominion to "one like a son of man". An angel interprets the vision. In the second, a ram with two horns is attacked by a goat with one horn; the one horn breaks and is replaced by four. A little horn arises and attacks the people of God and the temple, and Daniel is informed how long the little horn's dominion will endure. In the third, Daniel is troubled to read in holy scripture (the book is not named but appears to be Jeremiah) that Jerusalem would be desolate for 70 years. Daniel repents on behalf of the Jews and requests that Jerusalem and its people be restored. An angel refers to a period of 70 sevens (or weeks) of years. In the final vision, Daniel sees a period of history culminating in a struggle between the "king of the north" and the "king of the south" in which God's people suffer terribly; an angel explains that in the end the righteous will be vindicated and God's kingdom will be established on Earth.

== Additional tales (Greek text) ==
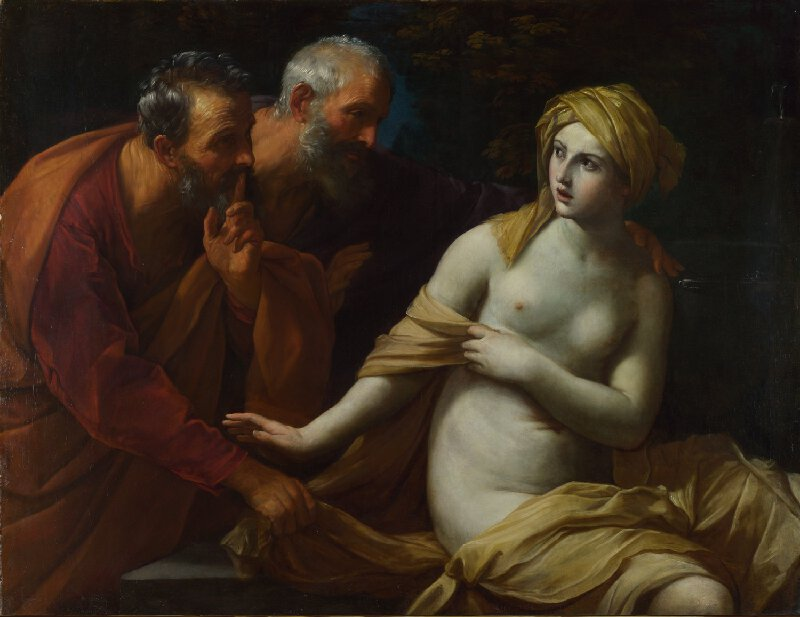
Susanna and the Elders, by Guido Reni

The Greek text of Daniel contains three additional tales, two of which feature Daniel (the third is an expansion of the tale of the fiery furnace).

1. The tale of Susanna tells how Daniel saves the reputation of a young Jewish married woman when two lecherous Jewish elders condemn her to death, supposedly for unchastity, but actually because she resisted their advances. Daniel's clever cross-examination unmasks their evil and leads to their deaths. The story is unique in that the villains are Jews instead of heathens; it may have been written as a polemic by the Pharisees against the Sadducees, who, according to their opponents, were abusing their control of the courts.
2. Bel and the Dragon consists of two episodes. In the first Daniel exposes the deceptions of the heathen priests, who have been pretending that their idols eat and drink (in fact it is the priests who have been consuming the food set out for the false gods). In the second Daniel destroys a giant serpent that Cyrus believes to be a god; the Babylonians revolt, Cyrus imprisons Daniel without food, the prophet Habakkuk miraculously feeds him, and Cyrus repents.

== Death and tomb of Daniel ==
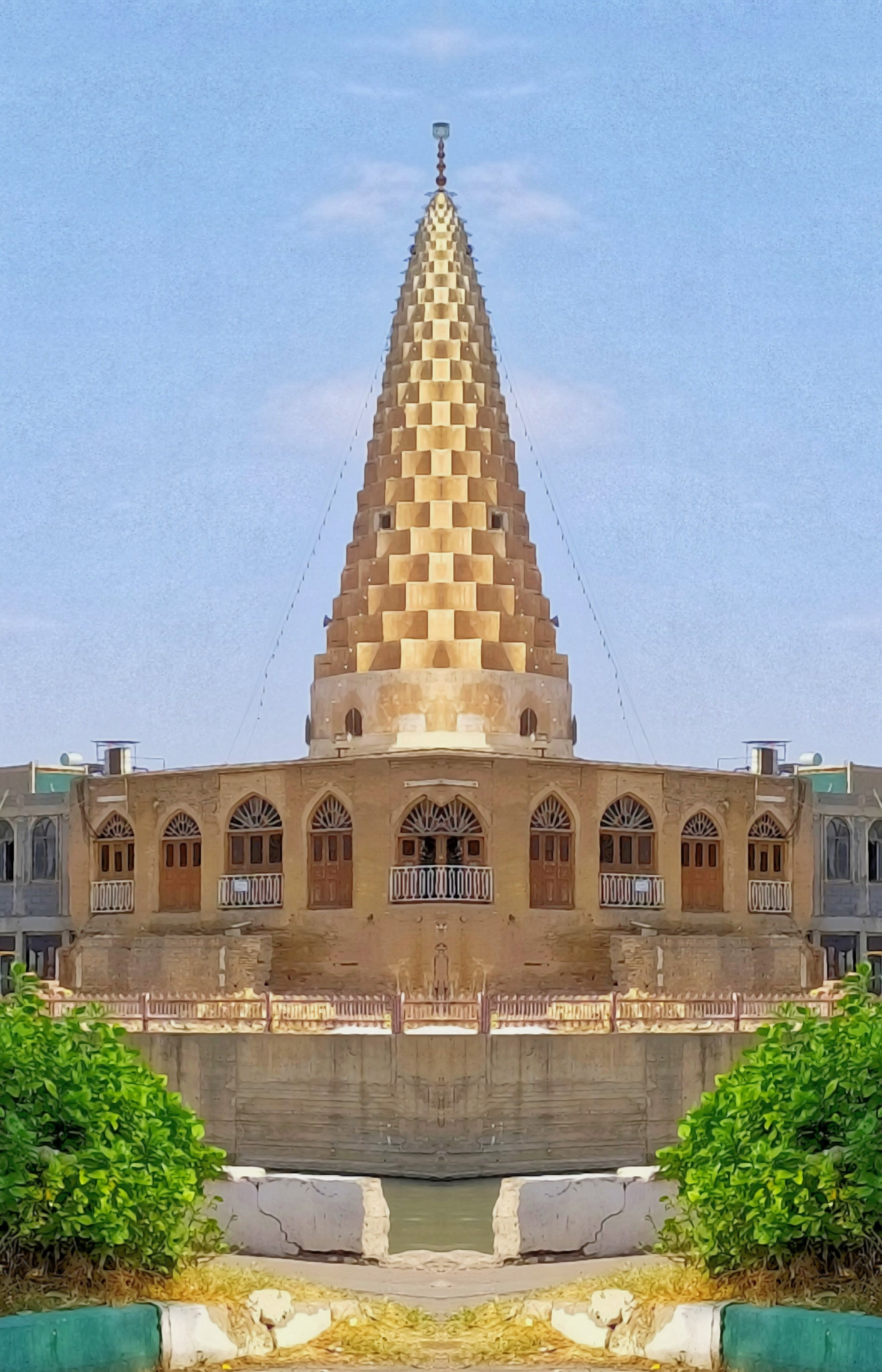
Tomb of Daniel at Susa

The last mention of Daniel in the Book of Daniel is in the third year of Cyrus (Daniel 10:1). Rabbinic sources suppose that he was still alive during the reign of the Persian king Ahasuerus (better known as Artaxerxes – Babylonian Talmud, Megillah 15a, based on the Book of Esther 4, 5), but he was killed by Haman, the wicked prime minister of Ahasuerus (Targum Sheini on Esther, 4, 11).

The 1st century Jewish writer Josephus reported that Daniel's body lay in a tower in Ecbatana in Parthia, alongside the bodies of the kings of the Medes and Persians; later Jewish authorities said he was buried in Susa, and that near his house were hidden the vessels from the Temple of Solomon. Muslim sources reported that the Muslims had discovered his body, or possibly only a box containing his nerves and veins, together with a book, a jar of fat, and a signet ring engraved with the image of a man being licked by two lions. The corpse was reburied, and those who buried it were decapitated to prevent them from revealing the spot.

Today six cities claim Daniel's Tomb: Babylon, Kirkuk and Muqdadiyah in Iraq, Susa and Malamir in Iran, and Samarkand in Uzbekistan. The most famous is that in Susa, (Shush, in southern Iran), at a site known as Shush-e Daniyal. According to Jewish tradition the rich and poor of the city quarreled over possession of the body, and the bier was therefore suspended from a chain over the centre of the river. A house of prayer open to all who believed in God was built nearby, and fishing was prohibited for a certain distance up and down the river; fish that swam in that section of the river had heads that glinted like gold, and ungodly persons who entered the sacred precinct would miraculously drown in the river. To this day the tomb is a popular site of pilgrimage.

== Daniel in later tradition ==
=== Judaism ===
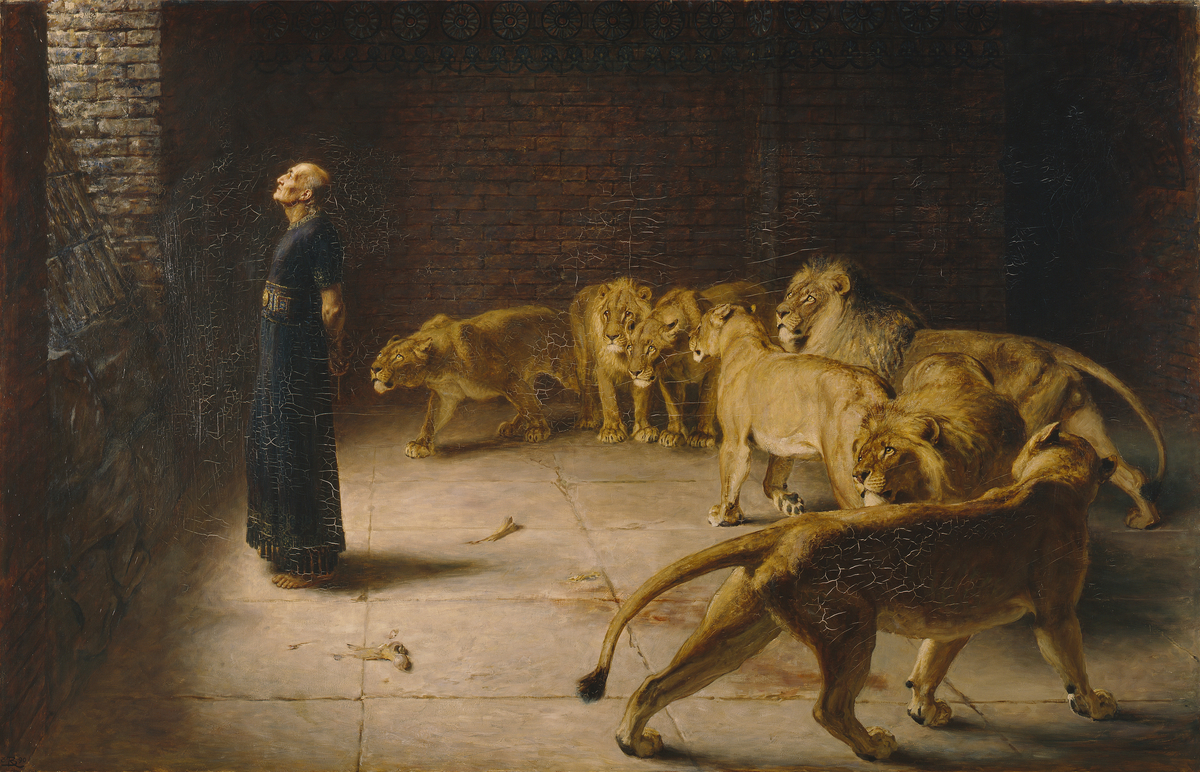
Daniel's Answer to the King (1890) by Briton Rivière

Daniel is not a prophet in Judaism: prophecy is reckoned to have ended with Haggai, Zechariah, and Malachi. In the Hebrew Bible his book is not included under the Prophets (the Hebrew Bible has three sections, Torah, Prophets and Writings), but nevertheless the eight copies found among the Dead Sea Scrolls and the additional tales of the Greek text are a testament to Daniel's popularity in ancient times.

The Jewish rabbis of the first millennium CE reckoned Daniel to be the most distinguished member of the Babylonian diaspora, unsurpassed in piety and good deeds, firm in his adherence to the Law despite being surrounded by enemies who sought his ruin, and in the first few centuries CE they wrote down the legends that had grown up around his name. His captivity was foretold by the prophet Isaiah to King Hezekiah in these words, "they (Hezekiah's descendants) shall be eunuchs in the palace of the king of Babylon." This misfortune was turned to a blessing when Daniel and his three companions were able to show their mutilated bodies to Nebuchadnezzar and so prove their innocence of charges of leading an unchaste life.

Daniel kept the welfare of Nebuchadnezzar in mind continually, and when the king was condemned by God to live as a beast for a certain period Daniel prayed that the period of punishment should be shortened, and his prayer was granted. When Nebuchadnezzar was dying he wished to include Daniel among his heirs, but Daniel refused the honour, saying that he could not leave the inheritance of his forefathers for that of the uncircumcised. Daniel also restored the sight of king Darius, who had wrongly thrown the pious Daniel into prison on false charges, upon which many converted to Judaism.

=== Christianity ===
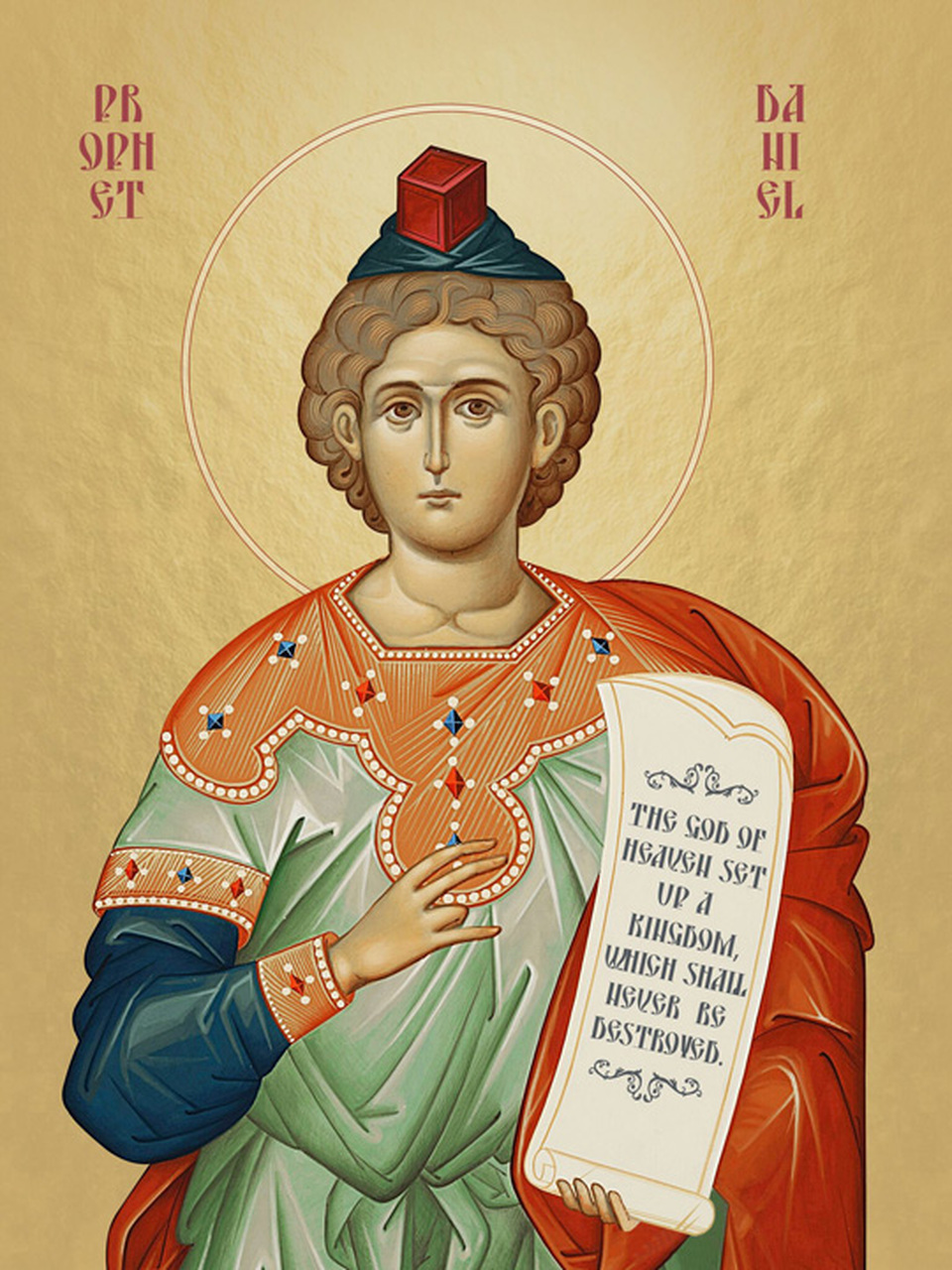
St. Daniel the prophet, c. 20th century. Orthodox iconography.

The New Testament makes a reference to Daniel at Matthew 24:15, in reference to the abomination of desolation. He is commemorated in the Coptic Church on the 23rd day of the Coptic month of Baramhat. On the Eastern Orthodox liturgical calendar, the feast days celebrating St. Daniel the Prophet together with the Three Young Men, falls on December 17 (during the Nativity Fast), on the Sunday of the Holy Forefathers (the Sunday which falls between December 11 and 17), and on the Sunday before Nativity. Daniel's prophecy regarding the stone which smashed the idol (Daniel 2:34–35) is often used in Orthodox hymns as a metaphor for the Incarnation: the "stone cut out" being symbolic of the Logos (Christ), and the fact that it was cut "without hands" being symbolic of the virgin birth. Thus the hymns will refer to the Theotokos (Virgin Mary) as the "uncut mountain".

The Roman Catholic Church commemorates St. Daniel in the Roman Martyrology on July 21. Some local liturgical calendars of dioceses also list his feast, sometimes on July 21 and sometimes on another day. For example, the archdiocese of Gorizia celebrates the feast of St. Daniel, prophet and confessor, on September 11. The reading of the Mass is taken from the Book of Daniel, chapter 14; the Gradual from Psalm 91; the Alleluia verse from the Epistle of James 1; and the Gospel from Matthew 24. The Calendar of Saints of the Lutheran Church–Missouri Synod commemorates Daniel, together with the Three Young Men (Shadrach, Meshach, and Abednego), on December 17.

=== Islam ===
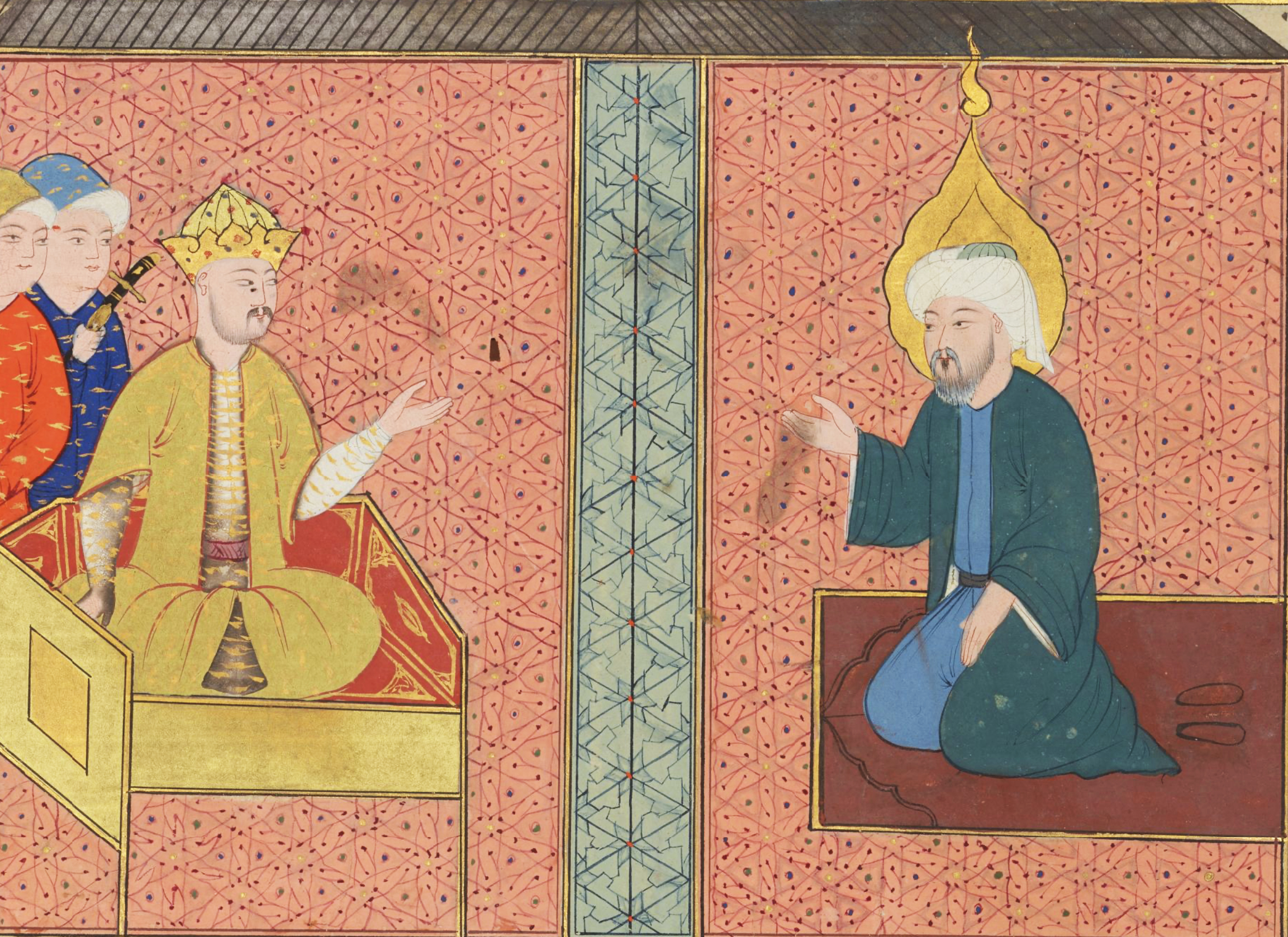
Illustration of a 1585–1590 Ottoman manuscript depicting Danyal (right) speaking to king Nebuchadnezzar II as a dream interpreter.

Daniel (Arabic: دانيال, Dānyāl) is not mentioned by name in the Qur'an and is generally not considered by Sunnis to be a Prophet of Islam, unlike Shia Muslims and some other denominations. However some literature by Muslims in later years contain accounts of his prophet-hood, which tells how he was rescued from lions with the aid of the prophet Jeremiah (in Bel and the Dragon it is the prophet Habakkuk who plays this role) and interpreted the king's dream of a statue made of four metals destroyed by a rock from heaven, as having interpreted the writing on the wall, investigation, etc. All sources, both classical and modern, describe him as a saintly and righteous man, carrying on the common tradition of accepting Jewish knowledge as long as it does not go against Quran and hadith. Abdullah Yusuf Ali (1872–1953) in his Qur'anic commentary says:

Daniel was a righteous man of princely lineage and lived about 620–538 B.C. He was carried off to Babylon in 605 B.C. by Nebuchadnezzar, the Assyrian, but was still living when Assyria was overthrown by the Medes and Persians. In spite of the "captivity" of the Jews, Daniel enjoyed the highest offices of state at Babylon, but he was ever true to Jerusalem. His enemies (under the Persian monarch) got a penal law passed against any one who "asked a petition of any god or man for 30 days" except the Persian King. But Daniel continued true to Jerusalem. "His windows being open in his chambers towards Jerusalem, he kneeled upon his knees three times a day, and prayed, and gave thanks before his God, as he did aforetime."

— Abdullah Yusuf Ali, The Holy Qur'an: Text, Translation and Commentary

In Kitab al-Kafi, Imam Ali ibn Husayn Zayn al-Abidin asserts that Allah revealed to Daniel that, "The most hated among my creatures are the ignorant ones who disrespect the scholars and do not follow them. The Most beloved to Me in My servants are the pious ones who work hard to become entitled for greater rewards, who always stay close to the scholars, follow the fore-bearing people and accept (the advice of) people of wisdom". Shiʾa hadith affirm Daniel as a prophet of God, and affirm the events aligning to the biblical narrative of Daniel as well.

=== Baháʼí ===
Daniel is considered a minor prophet in the teachings of the Baháʼí Faith. Some Baháʼí converts introduced the principle of reincarnation, specifically that of Daniel and John.

== See also ==
- Apocalypse of Daniel
- Arioch, Captain of the guard
- List of names referring to El
- Persian Jews

== Bibliography ==
- Collins, John J. (1984). Daniel: With an Introduction to Apocalyptic Literature. Eerdmans. ISBN 9780802800206.
- Collins, John J. (1999). "Daniel". In Van Der Toorn, Karel; Becking, Bob; van der Horst, Pieter Willem (eds.). Dictionary of Deities and Demons in the Bible. Eerdmans. ISBN 9780802824912.
- Coogan, Michael (2008). The Old Testament: A Very Short Introduction. Oxford University Press. ISBN 9780199719464.
- Day, John (1980). "The Daniel of Ugarit and Ezekiel and the Hero of the Book of Daniel". Vetus Testamentum. 30 (2): 174–184. doi:10.1163/156853380X00047.
- Ginzberg, Louis (1998). The Legends of the Jews. Vol. 4. JHU Press. ISBN 9780801858932.
- Gottheil, Richard; König, Eduard (1906). "Daniel's Tomb". Jewish Encyclopedia.
- Miller, Stephen R. (1994). Daniel. B&H. ISBN 9780805401189.
- Noegel, Scott B.; Wheeler, Brannon M. (2002). Historical Dictionary of Prophets in Islam and Judaism. Scarecrow Press. ISBN 9780810866102.
- Redditt, Paul L. (2008). Introduction to the Prophets. Eerdmans. ISBN 9780802828965.
- Reid, Stephen Breck (2000). "Daniel, Book of". In Freedman, David Noel; Myers, Allen C. (eds.). Eerdmans Dictionary of the Bible. Eerdmans. ISBN 9789053565032.
- Seow, C.L. (2003). Daniel. Westminster John Knox Press. ISBN 9780664256753.
- Spencer, Richard A. (2002). "Additions to Daniel". In Mills, Watson E.; Wilson, Richard F. (eds.). The Deuterocanonicals/Apocrypha. Mercer University Press. ISBN 9780865545106.
- Sprinkle, Joe M. (2020). Daniel: Evangelical Biblical Theology Commentary. Lexham Press. ISBN 978-1-68359-424-6.
- Stone, Michael E. (2011). Ancient Judaism: New Visions and Views. Eerdmans. ISBN 9780802866363.
- Tanner, J. Paul (2021). Daniel: Evangelical Exegetical Commentary. Lexham Press. ISBN 978-1-68359-309-6.
- Towner, Wayne Sibley (1984). Daniel. Westminster John Knox Press. ISBN 9780664237561.
- Walton, John J. (1994). Ancient Israelite Literature in Its Cultural Context. Zondervan. ISBN 9780310365914.
- Wesselius, Jan-Wim (2002). "The Writing of Daniel". In Collins, John J.; Flint, Peter W.; VanEpps, Cameron (eds.). The Book of Daniel: Composition and Reception. Brill. ISBN 978-0391041288.
