= Nutfield, Surrey =

Village and parish in Surrey, England

Coordinates: 51°14′17″N 0°07′59″W

Nutfield
- Village
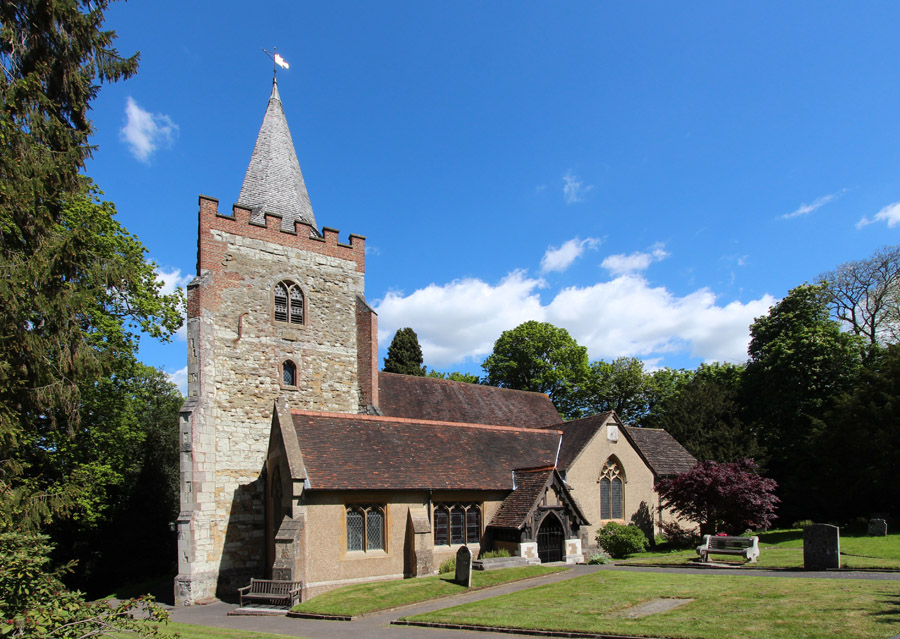
- St Peter and St Paul's Church

- Location within Surrey
- Area: 9.81 km^{2} (3.79 sq mi)
- Population: 2,673 (Civil Parish 2011)
  - Density: 272/km^{2} (700/sq mi)
  - London: 18 miles (29 km)
- Civil parish: Nutfield
- District: Tandridge
- Shire county: Surrey
- Region: South East
- Country: England
- Sovereign state: United Kingdom
- Post town: REDHILL
- Postcode district: RH1
- Dialling code: 01737
- Police: Surrey
- Fire: Surrey
- Ambulance: South East Coast

Nutfield is a village and civil parish in the Tandridge District of Surrey, England. It lies in the Weald immediately south of the Greensand Ridge and has a railway station at South Nutfield which is one stop from Redhill, on the Redhill to Tonbridge Line. It includes a watersports park and picnic destination, Mercers Country Park.

== History ==
The village lay within the Reigate hundred.

Nutfield appears in Domesday Book of 1086 as Notfelle. It was held by Countess Ida of Boulogne (2nd wife of Count Eustace). Its domesday assets were: 3 hides; 1 church, 16 ploughs, 1 mill worth 2s, 10 acres (40,000 m^{2}) of meadow, herbage worth 12 hogs. It rendered £15 per year to its feudal overlords.

At the end of the 12th century, Nutfield was held by Hubert de Anstey and his wife Dionysia, then in 1210 it passed to his son and heir Nicholas de Anstey.

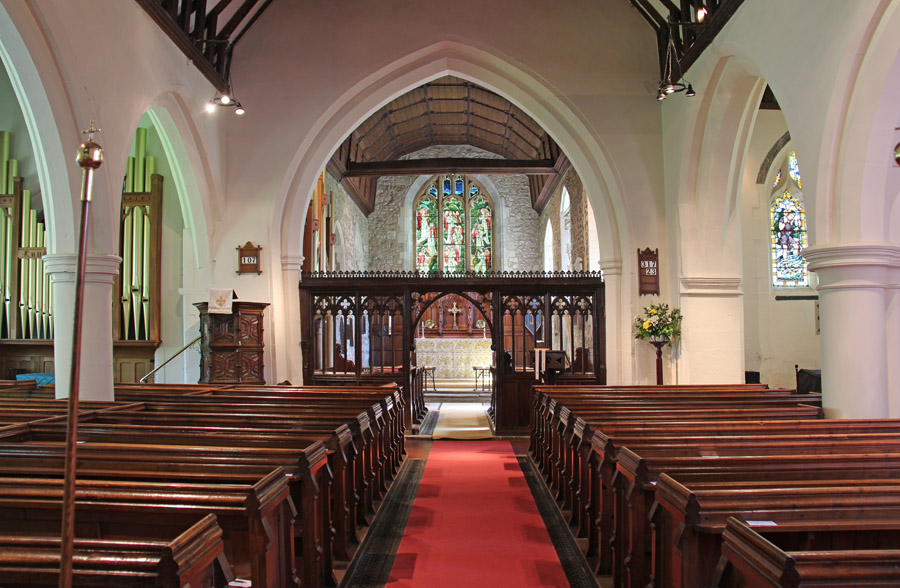
St Peter & St Paul's Church - interior

The Grade II* listed St Peter and St Paul's church was built in the early 13th century, with the lower part of the chancel wall still surviving. The chancel was extended and the upper part rebuilt in the early 14th century. The tower dates from the early 15th century but was partly rebuilt in 1786 and then restored in 1882. The roofs of the nave and chancel are covered with slabs of Horsham Stone while the spire is tiled with wood shingles. A sacristy was constructed in 1884. There are two stained glass windows by Edward Burne-Jones.

In 1755, around 900 Roman brass coins dating to the Later Empire were found in an earthenware pot along one of the village's roads.

The Grade II listed Nutfield Priory, to the west of the village centre, was constructed by John Gibson in 1872–4.

The railway reached Nutfield in 1842, but it was not until 1884 that Nutfield station was opened, around which time many mansion houses were constructed by the Victorians, exploiting the views over the South Downs.

== Geography ==
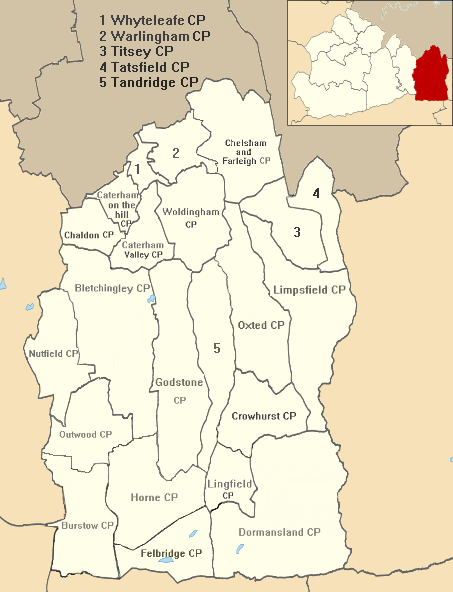
Map showing the position of Nutfield Civil Parish in Tandridge

The Nutfield Marshes are located at the north of the parish, in the Vale of Holmesdale. The area contains a series of wetland nature reserves restored from mining activities.

Fuller's earth pits are worked along the ridge of the Lower Green Sand, and have accounted for 65% of the United Kingdom's bentonite production since records began. Both blue and yellow varieties of fuller's earth are extracted, with the clays in Nutfield considered to be of exceptional quality.

A branch of the River Mole, Nutfield Brook, runs through South Nutfield.

== Localities ==
The village centre stretches south from the A25 towards Nutfield station where the neighbourhood of South Nutfield has grown up, exceeding its parent village in size. North of the A25 is Nutfield Marsh. Also to the north of the A25 is Nutfield Court, a former country house that has been redeveloped into apartments, adjacent to St Peter & St Paul's church.

== Governance ==
There is one representative on Surrey County Council, Chris Farr of the Independent group, for Godstone Division which includes Nutfield.

Following the 2024 Tandridge District Council election, Nutfield has three representatives on Tandridge District Council:

| Party | First elected | Member | Ward |
|---|---|---|---|
| Independent | 2023 | Helena Windsor | Bletchingley & Nutfield |
| Bletchingley & Nutfield Residents | 2024 | Louise Case | Bletchingley & Nutfield |
| Liberal Democrats | 2024 | Richard Fowler | Bletchingley & Nutfield |

The parish council has 8 members.

The parish council was set up in 1894 under the terms of the Local Government Act 1894. The council's work ranges from planning applications, allotments, cemetery, meeting and cultural venues, overgrown footpaths to dog fouling. The Metropolitan Green Belt has been used to retain the largely agricultural green belt around the village.

== Transport ==
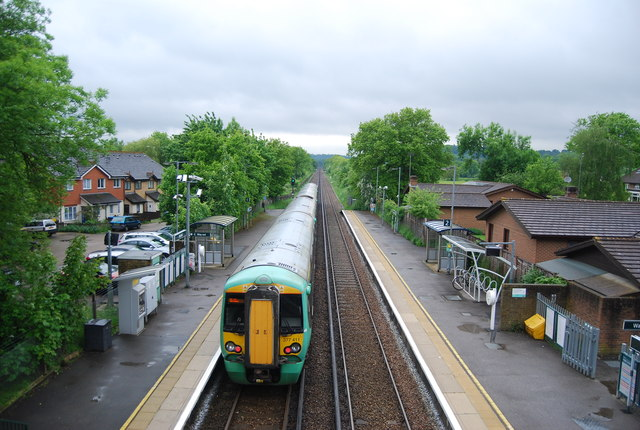
Nutfield Station

The village is served by Nutfield railway station on the Redhill–Tonbridge line which is located in South Nutfield, approximately 1 mile to the south of the village. The station is served by hourly train services between Redhill and Tonbridge.

The A23 has road junctions to the village in Redhill and Salfords to the west, each 2 miles (3.2 km) away.

The village is served by the Metrobus route 400 and Southdown PSV route 410. These buses provide connections to Oxted, Caterham, Redhill, Gatwick Airport, Crawley and East Grinstead.

== Amenities ==
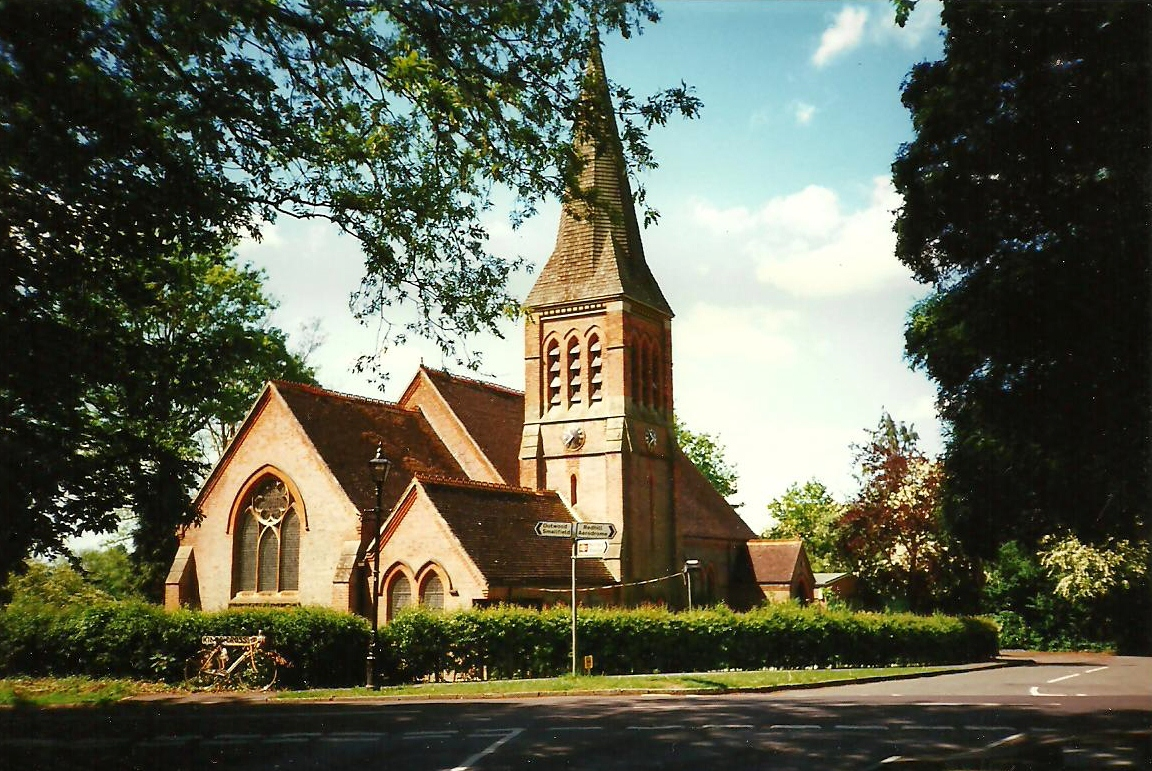
Christ Church, South Nutfield

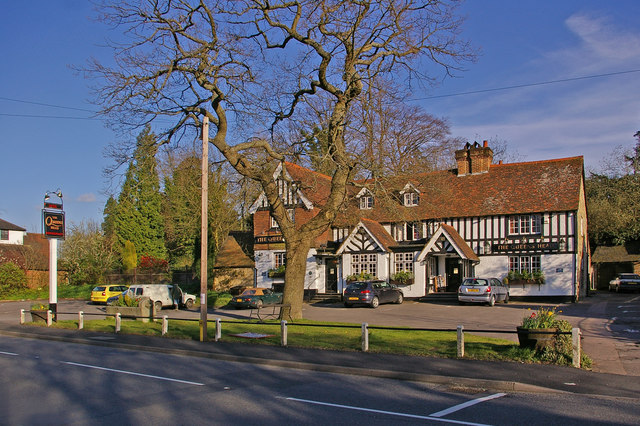
The Queens Head, High Street

Within the bounds of Nutfield is the Aqua Sports Company's Mercers Park country park.

Part of Redhill Aerodrome is situated within the parish. The Brewing Industry Research Foundation is also based in Nutfield.

There are two churches in the village, serving the separate Anglican parishes of Nutfield and South Nutfield: the mediaeval St Peter and St Paul's Church in Nutfield, and Christ Church in South Nutfield, constructed of red brick and opened in 1888.

A village hall is located at the centre of South Nutfield. Around 200 children are enrolled in Nutfield Church of England Primary School, which opened in 1969 and is located next to the Village Hall.

The Queens Head public house is located on the High Street, the east wing of which has been dendro-dated to 1505. Another public house, the Inn on the Pond, is based in Nutfield Marsh with earliest construction dated to the 17th century.

== Famous Inhabitants ==
- Maria Louisa Charlesworth, popular author of religious books for children in the 1800s, lived at Church Hill House, Nutfield, and at The Cottage, where she died in 1861. She was buried at St Peter & St Paul's Church.
- Bernard Corfield, vicar of Christ Church, South Nutfield until 1938 when he was appointed Bishop of Travancore and Cochin.
- Michael Maw (1912–1944), cricketer and Royal Air Force airman.
- Catherine Louisa Pirkis (1839–1910), author of detective fiction and animal welfare activist, was living at 'High Elms', Nutfield, in 1891.
- Wilfrid Sanderson, composer and organist, moved to Nutfield after the First World War and lived there until his death in 1935.
- Arthur James Stark, landscape painter, retired to Nutfield in 1886 and died there in 1902.

== Demography and housing ==
Population growth in Nutfield since 1801
| Year | 1801 | 1811 | 1821 | 1831 | 1841 | 1851 | 1881 | 1891 | 1901 | 1911 |
|---|---|---|---|---|---|---|---|---|---|---|
| Population | 524 | 631 | 707 | 718 | 872 | 895 | 1,093 | 1,642 | 1,860 | 1,845 |
| Year | 1921 | 1931 | 1951 | 1961 | 1971 | 1981 | 1991 | 2001 | 2011 | 2021 |
| Population | 1,828 | 2,129 | 2,043 | 2,597 | 2,707 | 2,693 | 2,650 | 2,728 | 2,673 | 2,709 |

According to the 2021 census, 94.1% of parish residents were White, 3.0% were mixed race, 1.2% were Black, and 1.2% were Asian.

2011 Census Homes
| Output area | Detached | Semi-detached | Terraced | Flats and apartments | Caravans/temporary/mobile homes | Shared between households |
|---|---|---|---|---|---|---|
| (Civil Parish) | 371 | 305 | 254 | 147 | 1 | 0 |

The average level of accommodation in the region composed of detached houses was 28%, the average that was apartments was 22.6%.

2011 Census Key Statistics
| Output area | Population | Households | % Owned outright | % Owned with a loan | hectares |
|---|---|---|---|---|---|
| (Civil Parish) | 2,673 | 1,078 | 35.5% | 41.2% | 981 |

The proportion of households in the civil parish who owned their home outright compares to the regional average of 35.1%. The proportion who owned their home with a loan compares to the regional average of 32.5%. The remaining % is made up of rented dwellings (plus a negligible % of households living rent-free).

== See also ==
- List of places of worship in Tandridge (district)
