= Marmaduke D'Arcy Wyvill =

Wyvill in 1895.

Marmaduke D'Arcy Wyvill (5 March 1849 – 23 September 1918) was a British Conservative Party politician.

He unsuccessfully contested the Bishop Auckland division of County Durham at the 1885 general election, losing by a wide margin to the Liberal Party candidate, whose majority was more than 44% of the votes.

Wyvill did not stand for Parliament again until the 1895 general election, when he was elected as Member of Parliament (MP) for the Otley division of the West Riding of Yorkshire, winning a seat which had been held by Liberals 1885. However, his majority of only 48 votes (0.6% of the total) was overturned at the 1900 general election, and after his defeat he did not stand again.

Parliament of the United Kingdom
Preceded by Sir John Barran, Bt	Member of Parliament for Otley; 1895 – 1900	Succeeded by James Duncan
