= Nutfield Priory =

Historic building in Nutfield, Surrey

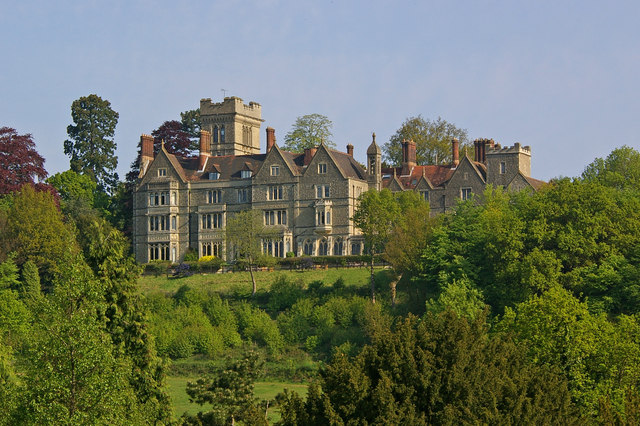
- View of the house from the gardens

- Location within Surrey
- 51°14′09″N 0°08′31″W
- Location: Nutfield
- OS grid reference: TQ2980850153

History
- Built: 1872-1874

Site notes
- Area: Surrey
- Architect: John Gibson
- Architectural style: Neo-gothic
- Owner: Hand Picked Hotels

Listed Building – Grade II
- Official name: Nutfield Priory
- Designated: 12 August 2011
- Reference no.: 1400998

Nutfield Priory is a Grade II listed country house in Nutfield, Surrey. It was constructed between 1872 and 1874 by John Gibson. It is now a hotel and health spa.

== History ==
In the 13th century, Reigate Priory was founded on this site by William de Warenne, 5th Earl of Surrey. The land was taken by the Crown during the Dissolution of the Monasteries, but was subsequently given to William Howard, 1st Baron Howard of Effingham, uncle of Henry VIII's fifth wife Catherine Howard.

In 1681, the estate was sold to the brewer John Parsons. It was divided into lots for sale in 1766; what became Nutfield Priory is a 93 acres (38 ha) site bought by John Fowler. The estate was inherited by John Fowler Wood and sold to H E Gurney, a Quaker, in 1854.

In 1866, Gurney's firm Overend Gurney declared bankruptcy, owing £19 million. The estate was sold to the brewer James Watney, who in turn sold it to the member of parliament Joshua Fielden in 1869. Fielden commissioned Gibson to design and build the present building, and held regular music recitals and events during his time there. He adhered to a rigid lifestyle, with guests not speaking to each other and following a predefined routine.

Following Fielden's death in 1887, ownership of the priory passed to his wife Ellen. She sold the house in 1920, where it remained a private residence before being sold again to O Picton Davis in 1930, who converted it into a luxury hotel with a nine-hole golf course.

The priory was commandeered by the British Army during World War II. It was subsequently used as a school for the deaf, installing closed-circuit television to aid with teaching. It was renovated as a hotel in 1989, restoring much of the original architecture. It was Grade II listed in 2011.

== Architecture ==
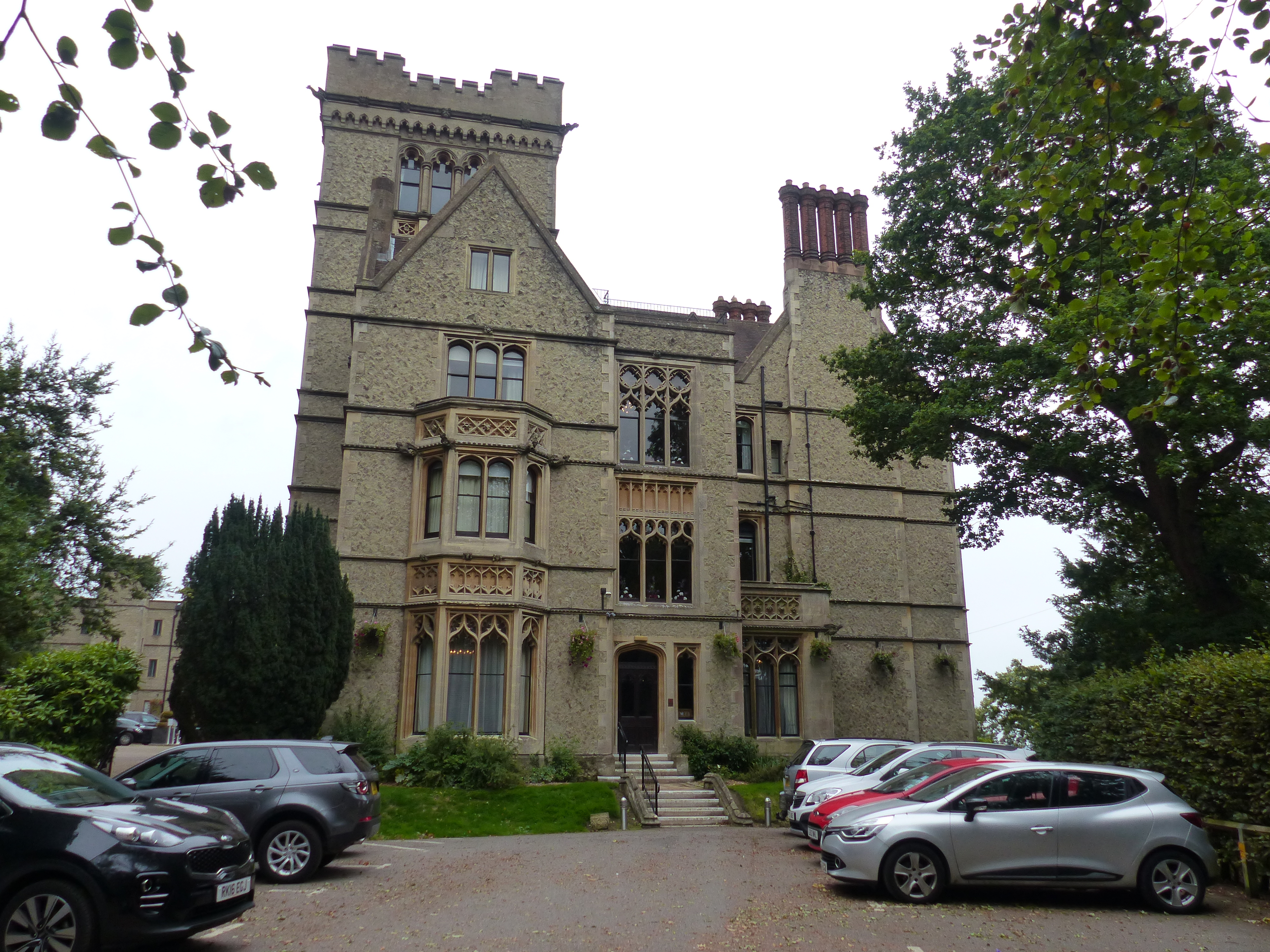
View of the priory's neo-Gothic design

Gibson designed the house in a neo-Gothic manner in the style of the Palace of Westminster. The priory is built from Kentish ragstone rubble and dressed with Reigate Stone. It is composed of two storeys and an attic, with a tiled roof. A six-storey tower hangs over the main entrance on the north side, while there is a three-storey projection to the west.
