= Joshua Fielden (politician) =

British cotton manufacturer and Conservative politician (1827–87)

Joshua Fielden JP

Member of Parliament for Eastern Division of the West Riding of Yorkshire
- In office 1868–1880 Serving with Christopher Beckett Denison
- Preceded by: New constituency
- Succeeded by: Andrew Fairbairn; Sir John Ramsden, Bt

Personal details
- Born: 8 March 1827 Todmorden, Calderdale, West Yorkshire, England
- Died: 9 March 1887 (aged 60) Cannes, France
- Party: Conservative
- Spouse: Ellen Brocklehurst (m. 1851)
- Children: 12, including Thomas and Edward
- Parent: John Fielden (father)

Joshua Fielden JP (8 March 1827 – 9 March 1887) of Stansfield Hall, Todmorden, was a British cotton manufacturer and Conservative politician.

== Early life ==
Fielden was born in Todmorden on 8 March 1827. He was the son of the Radical politician John Fielden of Todmorden, and his first wife, Anne Grindrod of Rochdale.

In 1869, Fielden's uncle Thomas died; his will (proved in 1870) divided an estate of £1.3m equally amongst his three nephews.

== Career ==
After education at a Unitarian school in Switzerland, Fielden returned to England to act as his father's private secretary, and to work in the family textile firm, Fielden Brothers. He became a partner in the firm in 1852. The business was very successful and profitable, and the Fielden family dominated public life in Todmorden, controlling the town's local board and preventing the erection of a workhouse in Todmorden until the 1870s. He was a justice of the peace for both Lancashire and Yorkshire (Todmorden being divided between the two counties).

Joshua played a part in the opposition to the Factory Act 1850 which added two hours to the working week in order to secure an end to the relay system. By the 1860s Fielden was again becoming involved in national politics, notably by his campaign against the Malt Tax. He also continued to argue for shorter working hours for labourers, while seeking cuts in government expenditure and (although a Dissenter) was opposed to the disestablishment of the Church of Ireland.

After receiving his inheritance from his uncle in 1869, Joshua retired from the family business and purchased the 300-acre (120-hectare) Nutfield Priory Estate, near Redhill, Surrey. He rebuilt Nutfield Priory as a Gothic mansion, employing John Gibson as his architect. Gibson had already worked for Fielden in Todmorden: he was responsible for the Town Hall, the Unitarian church and for extending Stansfield Hall. He moved from Stansfield Hall to Nutfield in 1872, hiring a special train to move his possessions. In 1885 he became a JP for Surrey. He led an increasingly extravagant lifestyle, having withdrawn his capital from the family firm in 1879.

He was a director of the South Eastern Railway from 1874 to 1879. in 1877 he led the Board in passing a vote of censure on the chairman (Sir Edward Watkin) and requiring the resignation of Watkin's son Alfred Watkin from the SER's employment. (Note: Alfred had been appointed locomotive superintendent of the SER on condition that he would treat it as a full-time job; he had continued to hold directorships in other railway companys controlled by his father; with the support of his father (who had commandeered the SER's company secretary to run the election campaign) Alfred had been elected MP for Great Grimsby but saw this not as reason to resign, but rather one to ask for a deputy to assist him with his SER duties.) When the shareholders voted to give Sir Edward extraordinary powers, Fielden resigned; he was replaced on the board by Alfred Watkin.

=== Member of Parliament ===
In August 1868, he was selected along with Christopher Denison as Conservative candidates for the two-seat Eastern Division of the West Riding of Yorkshire in the general election of that year. Accused of betraying his father's principles, he "defended his father from the imputation of being a Liberal", noting that Conservative MPs such as Lord John Manners and Benjamin Disraeli had supported John Fielden's Ten Hours Act. (Note: To a modern reader, Lord Shaftesbury might seem the most obvious Conservative supporter to cite, but he was out of favour with the Fieldens. The Liberals had originated the 'Compromise Act' Factory Act 1850 which (slightly) undid the Ten Hour Act; Manners (and Disraeli) had opposed it, but Shaftesbury had insisted on the Ten Hour Movement accepting it.) He supported extension of the Factory Acts and opposed centralising 'reforms' which took power away from local bodies; the New Poor Law showed how much evil they could bring about. Both Conservatives were elected to serve in the Commons, and Fielden was a Member of Parliament for 12 years. In 1871, he was described as "one of those obstinately independent members whom nobody and nothing can move". That year he declared himself to be, like the rest of his family, a Cobbettite Radical and hence wishing to defend and purify the existing Constitution, not (like those now calling themselves Radicals: Sir Charles Dilke, John Bright, and indeed Mr Gladstone himself) to make dangerous innovations on theoretical grounds.

He was in poor health from April 1876 onwards, being absent from Parliament for most of the next year and in later years thinking it imprudent to attend when there was a heavy fog. He took up yachting for his health and in 1879 indicated he would not stand at the 1880 general election, subsequently spending much of his time sailing in his yacht Zingara.

== Personal life ==
In 1851, he married Ellen Brocklehurst (1830–1929), the daughter of Thomas Brocklehurst and a niece of John Brocklehurst, MP for Macclesfield. In the same year of his marriage, he purchased Stansfield Hall outside Todmorden as his residence. Two of Joshua Fielden's sons were to have parliamentary careers. Their children included:

- Anne Fielden (b. 1852)
- John Fielden (b. 1853)
- Thomas Fielden (1854–1897) was MP for Middleton, which included the Lancashire portion of Todmorden, from 1886 to 1892, and 1895 and 1897. He married Martha Knowles, daughter of Thomas Knowles (MP for Wigan), in 1878.
- Ellen Unett Fielden (b. 1856)
- Edward Brocklehurst Fielden (1857–1942) was MP for Middleton from 1900 to 1906, and for Manchester Exchange from 1924 to 1935. He married Mary Ellen Knowles, another daughter of Thomas Knowles, in 1884.
- Mabel Fielden (b. 1859)
- Edith Fielden (1860–1942), who married Sir John Mackintosh MacLeod, 1st Baronet, son of The Very Reverend Norman Macleod in 1888.
- Joshua Fielden (1866–1944), who married Marion Ethel Sladen (1863–1897), daughter of Sir Edward Bosc Sladen, in 1895.
- Beatrice Alice Fielden, who married Dr. William Hunter FRSE (1861–1937), in 1894.

Joshua Fielden died in March 1887 at the Hotel Monte Carlo, Cannes, France. In spite of his lavish spending, he left an estate in excess of half a million pounds. He left Nutfield Priory and an annual income to his wife. The remainder of his property was divided between his 4 sons and 8 daughters. This included Stansfield Hall, estates at Hollins, Middletown Towers, Walsden and Rochdale, and Smithyholme and Rochdale Mills. He was buried in the churchyard of the church he and his brothers had built in Todmorden on 15 March.

=== Philanthropy ===
In 1865, Joshua and his brothers provided funds for the building of Todmorden Unitarian Church.; they later paid for the building of the town hall. Joshua was a strong Unitarian, and together with his older brother Samuel, helped to sustain the denomination in northern England by the paying of salaries to ministers.

== Notes ==
Parliament of the United Kingdom
New constituency	Member of Parliament for Eastern Division of the West Riding of Yorkshire; 1868–1880; With: Christopher Beckett Denison	Succeeded by Andrew Fairbairn and Sir John Ramsden, Bt
