= Eastern West Riding of Yorkshire =

Parliamentary constituency in the United Kingdom, 1868–1885

- Former county constituency for the House of Commons
- County: West Riding of Yorkshire

1868–1885
- Seats: Two
- Created from: Southern West Riding of Yorkshire
- Replaced by: Barkston Ash, Osgoldcross, Otley, Pudsey, Ripon and Spen Valley

Eastern West Riding of Yorkshire was a parliamentary constituency covering part of the historic West Riding of Yorkshire. It returned two Members of Parliament (MPs) to the House of Commons of the Parliament of the United Kingdom, elected by the bloc vote system.

== History ==
The constituency was created in 1868 when the West Riding of Yorkshire was redistributed from two divisions into three. The two-member West Riding of Yorkshire constituency had been divided for the 1865 general election into two new constituencies, each returning two members: Northern West Riding of Yorkshire and Southern West Riding of Yorkshire. The extra seats were taken from parliamentary boroughs which had been disenfranchised for corruption. In the redistribution which took effect for the 1868 general election the Eastern division was created and the Northern and Southern divisions modified. Each of the three divisions returned two members.

All three were abolished by the Redistribution of Seats Act 1885 for the 1885 general election. The Eastern division was replaced by six new single-member constituencies: Barkston Ash, Osgoldcross, Otley, Pudsey, Ripon and Spen Valley.

== Boundaries ==
The Reform Act 1867, as amended by the Boundary Act 1868, defined the constituency as the wapentakes of Claro, Skyrack, Barkston Ash and Osgoldcross with the part of Morley not in the Northern division. Skyrack is the wapentake centred on Leeds. The other areas included a number of small towns and the surrounding rural parishes.

== Members of Parliament ==
Election	1st Member	1st Party	2nd Member	2nd Party
1868	Christopher Beckett Denison	Conservative	Joshua Fielden	Conservative
1880	Sir Andrew Fairbairn	Liberal	Sir John Ramsden, Bt	Liberal
1885 Constituency abolished: see Barkston Ash, Osgoldcross, Otley, Pudsey, Ripon and Spen Valley

== Election results ==
Each voter had as many votes as there were seats to be filled. Before the introduction of the secret ballot, in 1872, votes had to be cast by a spoken declaration. Voting took place in public, at the hustings, which were at the place of election for the constituency which was in Leeds.

=== Elections in the 1880s ===
General election 31 March–27 April 1880: Eastern West Riding of Yorkshire (2 seats)
Party	Candidate	Votes	%	±%
Liberal	Andrew Fairbairn	9,518	26.9	+3.5
Liberal	John Ramsden	9,406	26.6	+3.0
Conservative	Christopher Beckett Denison	8,341	23.5	−3.2
Conservative	Henry Lascelles	8,157	23.0	−3.2
Majority		1,361	3.9	N/A
Majority		1,065	3.1	N/A
Turnout		17,711 (est)	81.8 (est)	+4.3
Registered electors		21,640		
Liberal gain from Conservative		Swing	+3.4	
Liberal gain from Conservative		Swing	+3.1	

=== Elections in the 1870s ===
General election 31 January-17 February 1874: Eastern West Riding of Yorkshire (2 seats)
Party	Candidate	Votes	%	±%
Conservative	Christopher Beckett Denison	8,240	26.7	+0.6
Conservative	Joshua Fielden	8,077	26.2	+1.2
Liberal	John Ramsden	7,285	23.6	−1.1
Liberal	Isaac Holden	7,218	23.4	−0.7
Majority		792	2.6	+2.3
Turnout		15,410 (est)	77.5 (est)	+0.5
Registered electors		19,882		
Conservative hold		Swing	+0.8	
Conservative hold		Swing	+1.1	

=== Elections in the 1860s ===
General election 17 November-7 December 1868: Eastern West Riding of Yorkshire (2 seats)
Party	Candidate	Votes	%	±%
Conservative	Christopher Beckett Denison	7,437	26.1	
Conservative	Joshua Fielden	7,135	25.0	
Liberal	Harry Thompson	7,047	24.7	
Liberal	Isaac Holden	6,867	24.1	
Majority		88	0.3	
Turnout		14,243 (est)	77.0 (est)	
Registered electors		18,494		
Conservative win (new seat)				
Conservative win (new seat)				
