= Christopher Beckett Denison =

Christopher Beckett Denison (9 May 1825 – 30 October 1884) was a British colonial administrator and Conservative politician.

He was the second son of Edmund Beckett Denison and his wife Maria née Beverley, of Grimsthorpe, Yorkshire. His father was twice elected as the Member of Parliament for the West Riding of Yorkshire.

Christopher was educated at Durham School and Uppingham Schools and the East India Company College. In 1845 he entered the Indian Civil Service and was a civil commissioner in the Punjab and Oudh. With the outbreak of the Indian Rebellion of 1857, Denison was attached to the East India Company's military forces. He was awarded a medal and clasp for his actions during the Siege of Lucknow.

By 1865 he had returned to England, where he succeeded his father as a director of the Great Northern Railway. In the same year a general election was called, and Denison was chosen in June as one of two Conservative candidates for the two-member Southern Division of the West Riding of Yorkshire. It was initially thought that there would be an uncontested election, with the two Conservatives returned unopposed. However, the Liberal Party subsequently nominated candidates, and Denison failed to be elected, finishing third in the poll.

At the next general election in 1868, Denison was again chosen to stand for parliament in the Conservative interest. Parliamentary boundaries had been altered by the Reform Act 1867, and he contested the new two-seat Eastern Division of the West Riding of Yorkshire. He and his fellow Conservative Joshua Fielden were elected to serve in the Commons. They retained their seats at the ensuing election in 1874. The Liberals took both seats in the constituency at the 1880 general election, Fielden having retired while Denison was beaten into third place.

Denison was unmarried. He died suddenly in Ireland in October 1884, aged 59.

Parliament of the United Kingdom
New constituency	Member of Parliament for Eastern Division of the West Riding of Yorkshire; 1868–1880; With: Joshua Fielden	Succeeded by Andrew Fairbairn and Sir John Ramsden, Bt
