= Darius the Mede =

Biblical character

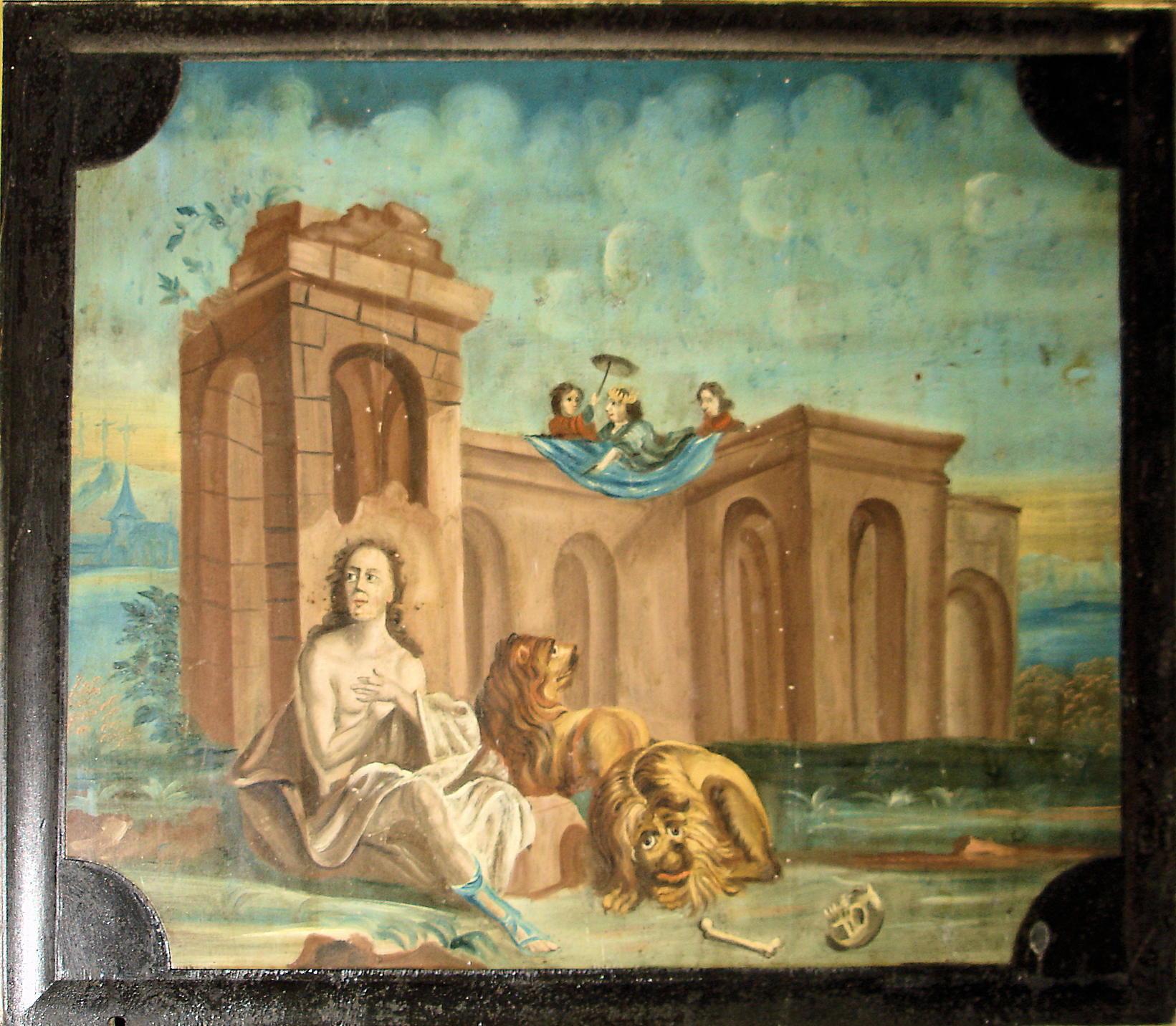
Detail from the church of Lambrechtshagen, Germany, 1759: Daniel in the lions' den with Darius the Mede above.

Darius the Mede is mentioned in the Book of Daniel as King of Babylon between Belshazzar and Cyrus the Great, but he is not known to established history and there is no space in the historical timeline between those two verified rulers. Belshazzar, who is often mentioned as king in the book of Daniel, was in fact the crown-prince and governor while his father was in Arabia from ca. 553 to 543 BCE, but Nabonidus had returned to Babylon years before the fall of the Babylonian empire.

Most scholars view this Darius as a literary fiction, but some have tried to harmonize the Book of Daniel with history by identifying him with various known figures, notably Cyrus, Cyaxares II, or Gobryas, the general who was first to enter Babylon when it fell to the Persians in 539 BCE.

== Biblical mentions ==
Darius is first mentioned in the story of Belshazzar's feast (Daniel 5). Belshazzar, king of Babylon, holds a great feast, during which a hand appears and writes on the wall: "MENA, MENA, TEKAL, and PERSIN" (מנא מנא תקל ופרסין). Daniel interprets the words: Belshazzar has been weighed and found wanting, and his kingdom is to be divided between the Medes and Persians. The story concludes: "That very night Belshazzar the Chaldean (Babylonian) king was killed, and Darius the Mede received the kingdom."

In the story of Daniel in the lions' den (Daniel 6), Daniel has continued to serve at the royal court under Darius, and has been raised to high office. His jealous rivals plot his downfall, tricking Darius into issuing a decree that no prayers should be addressed to any god or man but to Darius himself, on pain of death. Daniel continues to pray to the God of Israel. Darius although deeply distressed, must condemn him to be thrown into the lions' den because the edicts of the Medes and Persians cannot be altered. At daybreak the king hurries to the place and Daniel tells him that his God sent an angel to save him. Darius commands that those who had conspired against Daniel should be thrown to the lions in his place, along with their wives and children.

The final appearance of Darius is in Daniel 9, which presents a vision of Daniel relating to the end-time travails and triumph of the Israelites over their enemies. The mention of Darius is used as a chronological marker, placing the vision in "the first year of Darius son of Ahasuerus".

== Historical and literary background ==
The Persian invasion of Babylonia, September–October 539 BCE, showing Gutium, Opis, and Babylon.

=== Medes and the fall of Babylon ===
The Medes were an Iranian people who had become a major political power in the Near East by 612 BCE, when they joined the Babylonians in overthrowing Assyria. Their kingdom came to an end in 550 BCE (or 553 BCE according to some sources), when it was conquered by Cyrus the Great, the Persian king of Anshan in south-western Iran.

After extending his empire from the Mediterranean to Central Asia, Cyrus turned his attention to Babylonia. The most important ancient sources for his conquest of Babylon are the Nabonidus Chronicle (Nabonidus was the last Babylonian king, and Belshazzar, who is described as king of Babylon in the Book of Daniel, was his son and crown prince), the Cyrus Cylinder, and the Verse Account of Nabonidus—which, despite its name, was commissioned by Cyrus.

Cyrus' Babylonian campaign began in 539 BCE, although there were presumably previous tensions. On 10 October Cyrus won a battle at Opis, opening the way to Babylon, and on 12 October "Ugbaru, governor of the district of Gutium, and the army of Cyrus entered Babylon without a battle" (Babylonian Chronicle). Ugbaru is presumably the same person as the Gobryas mentioned by the Greek historian Xenophon, a Babylonian provincial governor who switched to the Persian side. Cyrus made his entrance into the city a few days later; Nabonidus was captured and his life spared, but nothing is known of the fate of Belshazzar.

=== Historicity of the Book of Daniel ===
The Book of Daniel is not regarded by scholars as a reliable guide to history, and the broad consensus is that Daniel is not a historical figure, the author appearing to have taken the name from a legendary figure of the distant past mentioned in the Book of Ezekiel. While it is a book featuring prophecies, the book that bears Daniel's name is an apocalypse, not a book of prophecy, and its contents are a cryptic allusion to the persecution of the Jews by the Greek Seleucid king Antiochus IV Epiphanes (reigned 175–164 BCE).

There is broad agreement that the stories making up chapters 1–6 are legendary in character, that the visions of chapters 7–12 were added during the persecution of Antiochus Epiphanes, and that the book itself was completed soon after 164 BCE (soon after the reign of Antiochus).

Daniel 5 and Daniel 6 belong to the folktales making up the first half of the book. The language of Daniel 5 ("Belshazzar's Feast"), for example, follows ancient Near Eastern conventions which are in some cases precisely those used in Daniel. Daniel 6 ("Daniel in the Lions' Den") is based on the classic Babylonian folk-tale Ludlul Bel Nemeqi, telling of a courtier who suffers disgrace at the hands of evil enemies but is eventually restored due to the intervention of a kindly god (in the story in Daniel, this is the God of Israel); in the Babylonian original, the "pit of lions" is a metaphor for human adversaries at court, but the biblical tale has turned the metaphorical lions into real animals.

In Daniel 9, Daniel, pondering the meaning of Jeremiah's prophecy that Jerusalem would remain desolate for seventy years, is told by the angel Gabriel that the 70 years should be taken to mean seventy weeks (literally "sevens") of years. Verse 1 sets the time of Daniel's vision as the "first year of Darius son of Ahasuerus, by birth a Mede", but no Darius is known to history, nor can any king of Babylon be placed chronologically between the known historical figures of Belshazzar and Cyrus.

== Identity ==
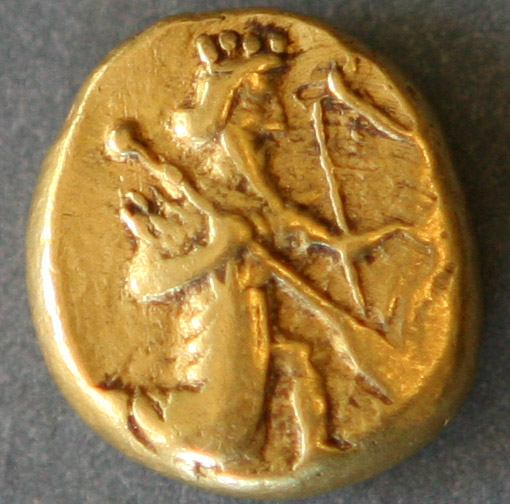
Gold Persian daric (with a purity of 95.83%) issued by Darius the Great, c. 490 BCE.

H. H. Rowley's 1935 study of the question (Darius the Mede and the Four World Empires in the Book of Daniel, 1935) concluded that Darius the Mede could not be identified with any king in other recorded history, and he is seen today by some as a literary fiction combining the historical Persian king Darius I and the words of Jeremiah 51:11 that God "stirred up" the Medes against Babylon. Attempts have been made to identify him with historical figures, with the following being perhaps the best-known candidates:

- Darius the Great (Darius I Hystaspes), c. 550–486 BC. This historically known Darius was the third Persian emperor, and an important figure for Jews in the early Persian period because of his role in the rebuilding of the Temple in Jerusalem. At the beginning of his career Darius had to (re)conquer Babylon to remove a usurper, before expanding the empire and dividing it into satraps. The author of Daniel, mindful of certain prophecies that the Medes would destroy Babylon (Jeremiah 51:11,28 and Isaiah 13:17), (see the story of Nebuchadnezzar's dream in Daniel 2), identified the historical Darius as the Mede.
- Astyages. Astyages was the last king of the Medes; he was defeated by Cyrus in 550 (or 553). His father was named Cyaxares, a possible variant of "Ahasuerus", but there is no record of him being present at the fall of Babylon. Consequently, he gets little attention in modern apologetics, but the 1st century CE Jewish historian Josephus, followed later by the early Christian Church Father Jerome, harmonized Daniel with the historical sources by claiming that Darius the Mede was a son of Astyages. The original Douay-Rheims Bible commentary by Worthington claims that Darius the Mede was another name for Astyages, although this "Astyages" in question was interpreted by the Haydock Bible as referring to Cyaxares II.
- Cyaxares II. The Greek writer Xenophon tells of a Median king called Cyaxares who was the son of Astyages; Although Xenophon is not generally given much credence by historians today, and he does not claim that Cyaxares II ever ruled Babylon, Xenophon was correct about a number of details not recorded by other ancient historians, which causes some scholars, such as Tufts classicist Steven W. Hirsch, to argue that he is a trustworthy source on the existence of Cyaxares II. This was the most traditional Catholic identification of Darius with a real historical figure, a view held by various Catholic scholars including George Leo Haydock and Richard Challoner. But the most important early Christian scholar to hold this opinion was Jerome, writing: "He [Daniel] calls Darius, Cyrus's uncle, a ram. He reigned over the Medes after his father, Astyages. And the one horn which was higher than the other, and growing still larger, signified Cyrus himself, who succeeded his maternal grandfather, Astyages, and reigned over the Medes and Persians along with his uncle, Darius, whom the Greeks called Cyaxeres". Following the Protestant Reformation, some of the people who subscribed to this identification included John Calvin, James Ussher, Charles Rollin, William Lowth, Adam Clarke, Thomas Hartwell Horne, Wilhelm Gesenius, Humphrey Prideaux, C. F. Keil, Otto Zöckler and E. W. Hengstenberg. This view was also held by the first century Jewish historian Flavius Josephus.
- Cyrus. This argument hinges on a reinterpretation of Daniel 6:28, "Daniel prospered during the reign of Darius, and the reign of Cyrus the Persian", to read "Daniel prospered during the reign of Darius, even the reign of Cyrus the Persian", making them the same individual. William Shea and Steven Anderson, conservative scholars, comment that it would be strange to refer to Cyrus the Persian, son of Cambyses I, as Darius the Mede, son of Ahasuerus, and also strange to refer to the same king as Cyrus in some passages and Darius in others.
- Cambyses II. Cambyses was Cyrus' son and his successor as emperor. The Babylonian records indicate that Cyrus installed him as regent in Babylon, but he was not a Mede, his father was not Ahasuerus, and he was probably not 62 years old.
- Ugbaru (called Gobryas in Greek sources) was the general who took Babylon for Cyrus. He was previously the Babylonian governor of Gutium (an area closely associated with Media in Babylonian sources) before switching sides to the Persians, and Cyrus seems to have given him administrative responsibility for Babylon after its capture. But, he died within one month of being appointed ruler of Babylon by Cyrus, so Cyrus appointed general Gubaru as ruler.
- Gubaru is a different general than Ugbaru, but his name is also translated as Gobryas in Greek, thereby causing confusion in The Nabonidus Chronicle. Cyrus installed Gubaru as regent in Babylon when Ugbaru died. Gubaru was a Mede because his father was Ahasuerus, and he was born in 601 BC making him 62 years old when he ruled under Cyrus as a petty king; and, he reigned for fourteen years. Josephus credits Darius as ruling with Cyrus after defeating the Babylonians, being a descendant of Astyages, and having an alternate Greek name.
