= Cyaxares I =

Median tribal chief

Cyaxares I was one of the Near East tribal rulers of the end of the 8th century BC. Cyaxares I, who, according to Berosus and Abydenus, was also called Astyages ( i.e., Ashdahak ), and also Astyages, the father of Cyaxares II.

== History ==
In two Assyrian inscriptions from the time of Sargon II, when listing the petty Median tribal rulers, a certain Uksatar is mentioned. In one of the inscriptions under 714 BC. e. among the twenty-six Median rulers, he is mentioned with the title "ruler of the river" (ša nārti), which a number of researchers are trying to identify with the Ecbatana region. In another inscription, relating to the 8th campaign of Sargon II, it is reported that the Median prince Uksatar paid tribute in Parsava (land of the Persians) southeast of Lake Urmia. The very record of the name of this person, which is read in cuneiform as Uksatar, is identified by some researchers with the name of the later well-known Median king Cyaxares, and thus, they consider this ruler Cyaxares I, and the Herodotus Cyaxares - Cyaxares II. Opinions were expressed that "Cyaxares" was not the name, but the title of the ruler.

This Cyaxares was also tried to be identified with Deioces (Assyrian Daiukku), whose name is also mentioned in another inscription of Sargon II as the name of a captured tribal king or judge of the Medes or Manneans, and sometimes with the son of Deioces Phraortes.

== See also ==
- Cyaxares II
