= Ahasuerus =

Name of various rulers in the Hebrew Bible

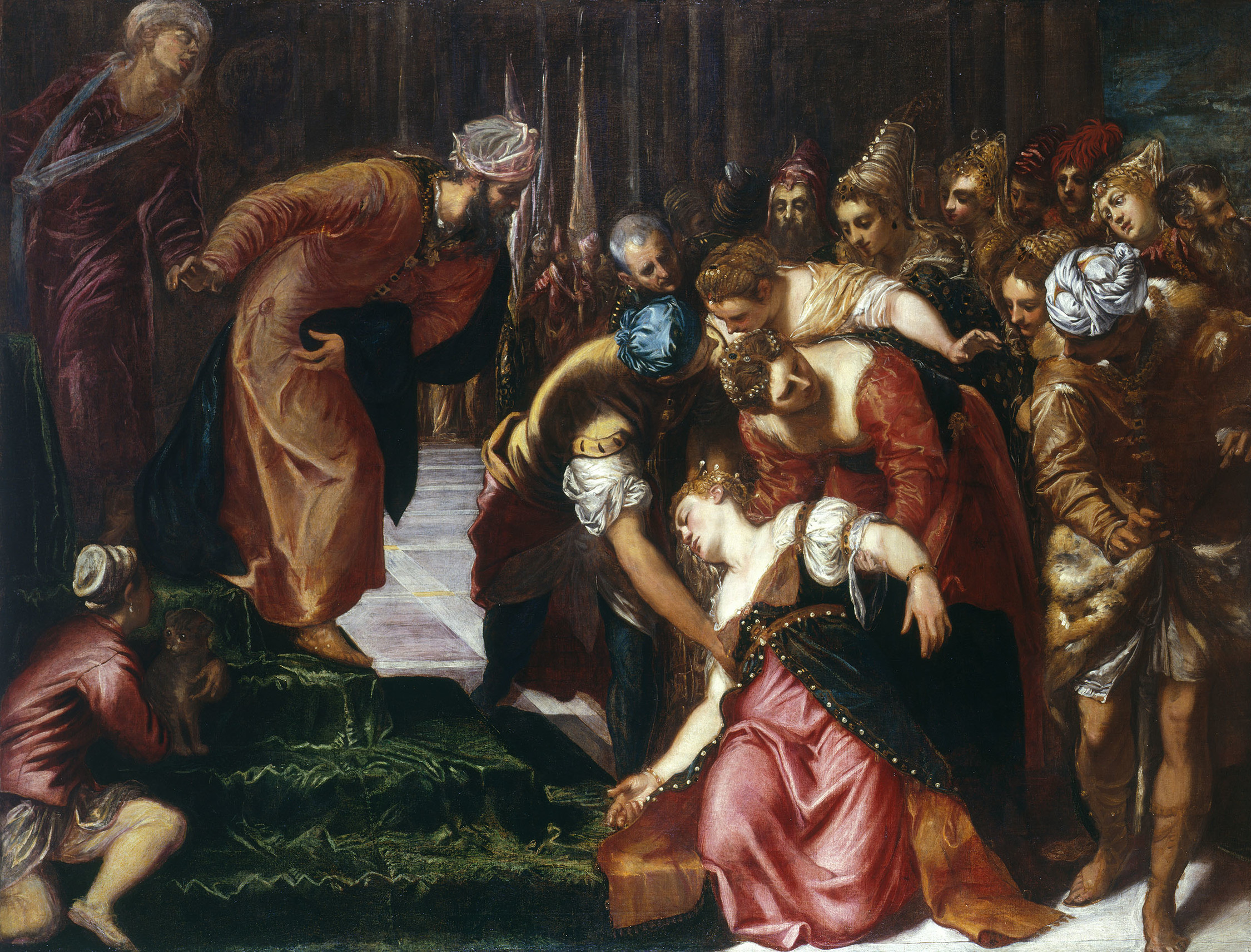
Esther Before Ahasuerus (1547–48), Tintoretto, Royal Collection.

Ahasuerus (/əˌhæzjuˈɪərəs/ ə-HAZ-ew-EER-əs; Hebrew: אֲחַשְׁוֵרוֹשׁ, Modern: ʾĂḥašverōš, Tiberian: ʾĂḥašwērōš, commonly Achashverosh; (Note: Cf. Old Persian: 𐎧𐏁𐎹𐎠𐎼𐏁𐎠𐎴, romanized: Xšaya-ṛšā; Persian: اخشورش, romanized: Axšoreš; New Persian: خشایار, romanized: Xašāyār; Ancient Greek: Ξέρξης, romanized: Xérxēs.) Koine Greek: Ἀσουήρος, romanized: Asouḗros, in the Septuagint; Latin: Assuerus in the Vulgate) is a name applied in the Hebrew Bible to three rulers of Ancient Persia and to a Babylonian official (or Median king) first appearing in the Tanakh in the Book of Esther and later in the Book of Tobit. It is derived from either "Xerxes" or "Artaxerxes;" both are names of multiple Achaemenid dynasty Persian kings.

== Etymology ==
The Hebrew form is believed to have derived from the Old Persian name of Xerxes I, Xšayāršā (< xšaya 'king' + aršan 'male' > 'king of all male; Hero among Kings'). That became Babylonian Aḫšiyâršu (𒄴𒅆𒐊𒅈𒋗, aḫ-ši-ia-ar-šu) and then Akšîwâršu (𒀝𒅆𒄿𒈠𒅈𒍪, ak-ši-i-wa_{6}-ar-šu) and was borrowed as Hebrew: אֲחַשְׁוֵרוֹשׁ, romanized: Ăḥašwēroš and thence into Latin as Ahasuerus, the form traditionally used in English Bibles. The Persian name was independently rendered in Ancient Greek as Ξέρξης Xérxēs. Many newer English translations and paraphrases of the Bible have used the name Xerxes.

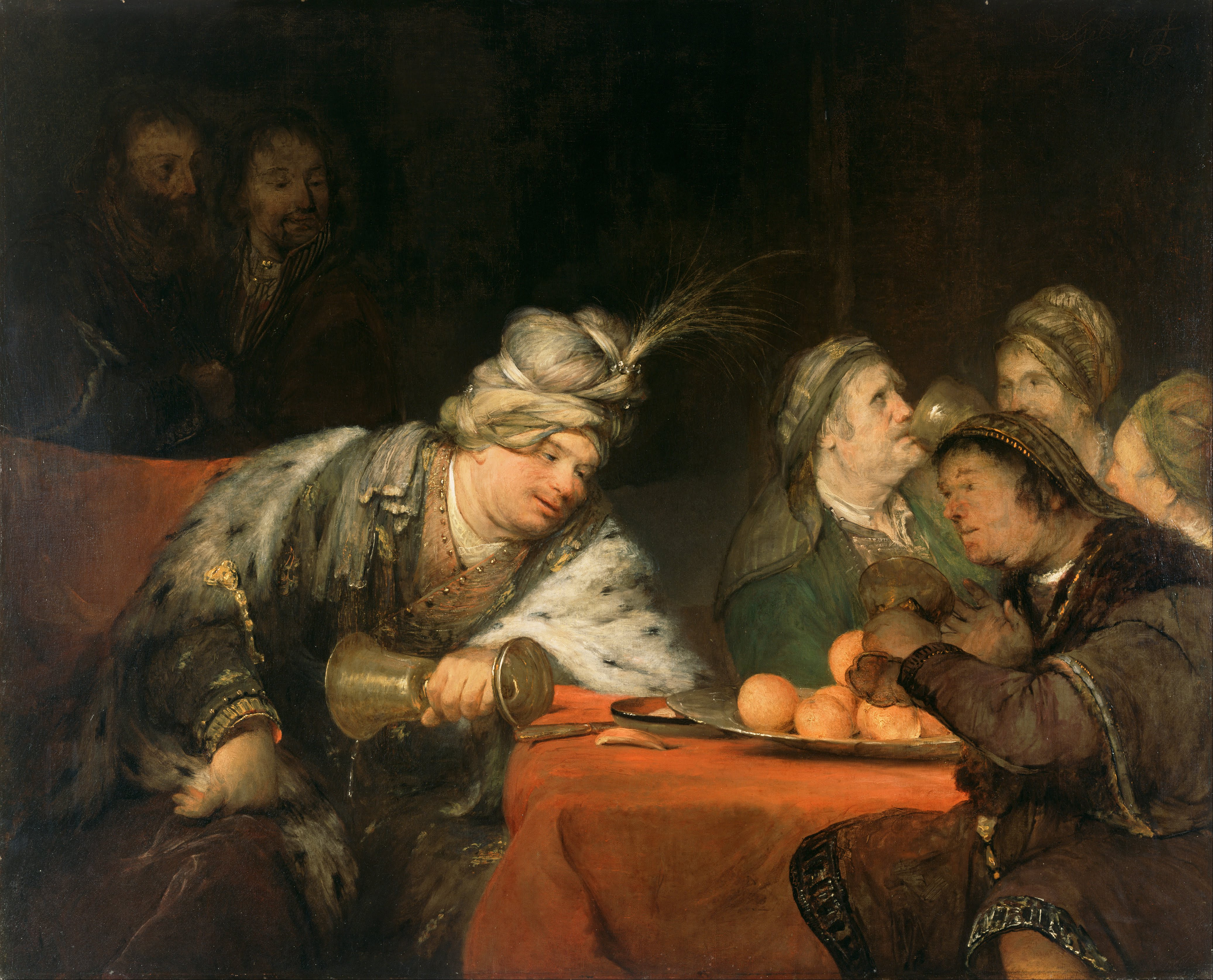
The Banquet of Ahasuerus, Aert de Gelder

== Book of Esther ==
"Ahasuerus" is given as the name of a king, the husband of Esther, in the Book of Esther. He is said to have "ruled over a hundred and twenty-seven provinces from India to Nubia" – that is, over the Achaemenid Empire. Some consider the narrative of Esther was to provide an aetiology for Purim, and that the name Ahasuerus is usually understood to refer to Xerxes I, who ruled the Achaemenid Empire between 486 and 465 BC. Outside of the book of Esther, history records that Xerxes was married to Amestris, not Vashti or Esther. Moreover, it is understood that Persian kings did not marry outside a restricted number of Persian noble families. In the Septuagint, the Book of Esther refers to the king as 'Artaxerxes', who was the younger son of Xerxes (Ancient Greek: Ἀρταξέρξης).

=== Identification of "Ahasuerus" as Xerxes I ===
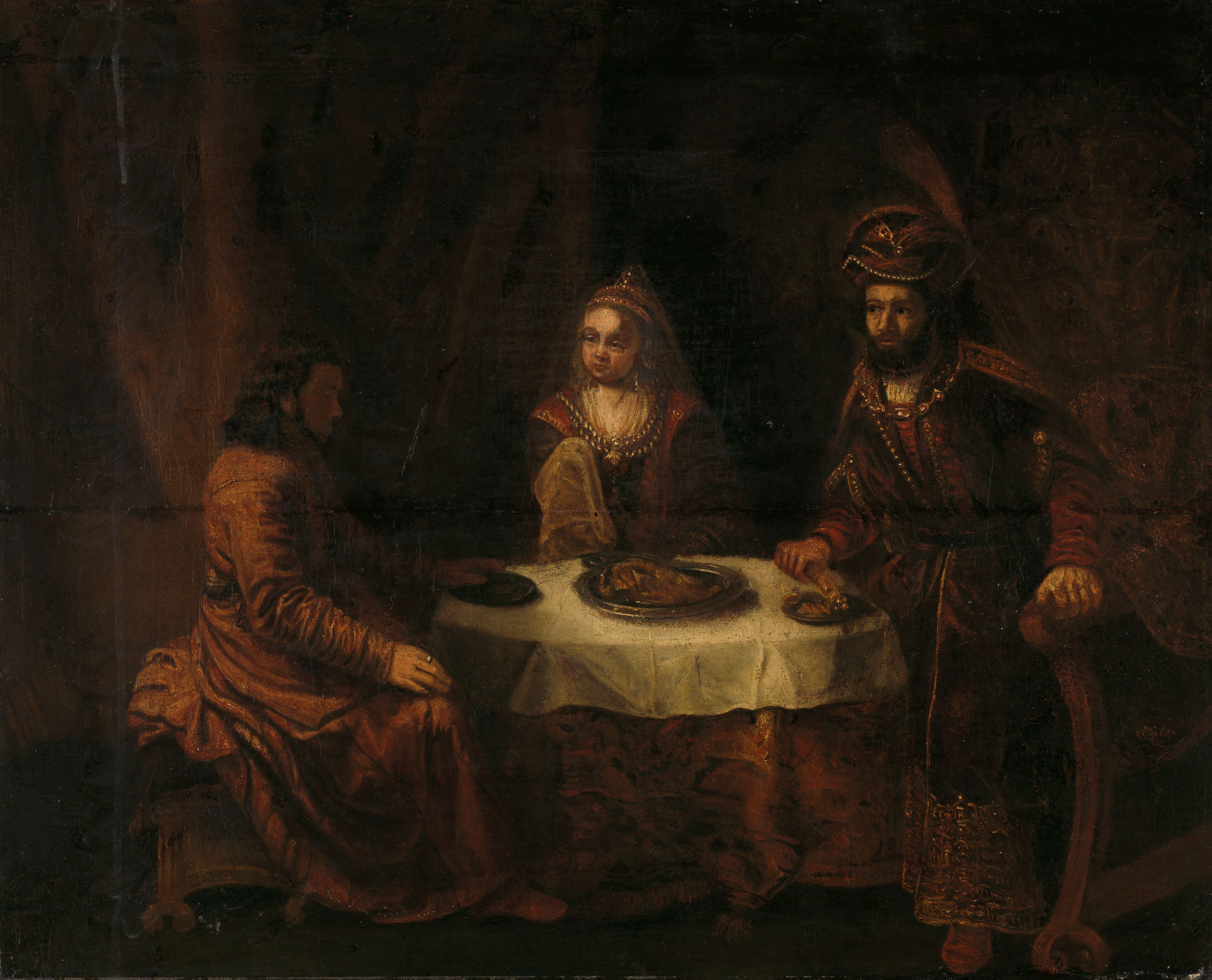
The wrath of Ahasuerus (anonymous), Rijksmuseum

Numerous scholars have proposed theories as to who Ahasuerus represents. Most scholars today identify him with Xerxes I, as did 19th-century Bible commentaries. Three factors, among others, contribute to this identification:

1. It is believed the Hebrew 'Ahasuerus' descended from the Persian names for Xerxes I.
2. Historian Herodotus describes Xerxes I as being susceptible to women and in the habit of making extravagant offers to them, just as he did to Esther ("up to half my kingdom"). Herodotus mentions that the Persian empire stretched from India to Ethiopia and also refers to the magnificent royal palace in Shushan (Susa), corroboration of what is stated in the Book of Esther. In addition Herodotus mentions an assembly of Persian nobles called by Xerxes to advise him on the proposed war against Greece. Although Herodotus does not give the location of this assembly, the date – "after Egypt was subdued" – corresponds to Xerxes' third year when Esther records an assembly of Persian nobility at a feast. (Histories VII.8) Herodotus also mentions that following his defeat at Salamis Xerxes I became involved in harem intrigues involving his wife Amestris and his daughter-in-law, with whom he became enamoured. (Histories IX.108) Herodotus relates this occurred in the tenth month of his seventh year as king – the same time Ahasuerus was choosing beautiful women for his harem (Esther 2:16).
3. Annals from the reign of Xerxes I mention an otherwise unattested official by the name of "Marduka", which some have proposed refers to Mordecai, as both are mentioned serving in the king's court.

=== Identification of "Ahasuerus" as Artaxerxes I ===
While today the king of Esther is usually identified as Xerxes I, the ancient traditions identify him with his son, Artaxerxes I. The Septuagint, the Vulgate, the Midrash of Esther Rabbah, 1:3, and the Josippon identify him as Artaxerxes. Many historians and exegetes from ancient times and the Middle Ages also identified Ahasuerus with Artaxerxes I, including, most notably, Josephus, who relates that "Artaxerxes" was the name by which he was known to the Greeks. The Ethiopic text calls him Arťeksis, usually the Ethiopic equivalent of Artaxerxes.

=== Identification of "Ahasuerus" as Cambyses II ===
Some traditional scholars, such as Gilbert Génébrard, have identified him as Cambyses II, in accordance with the chronology presented in the traditional Rabbinic chronographical work, Seder Olam Rabbah. However, Cambyses did not reign long enough to be the king in this book.

=== Identification of "Ahasuerus" as Artaxerxes II ===
Some have speculated that the king was Artaxerxes II. In his Chronography, the 13th century Syriac historian Bar Hebraeus also identifies Ahasuerus as Artaxerxes II citing the sixth century AD historian John of Ephesus. Plutarch in his Lives (AD 75) records alternative names Oarses and Arsicas for Artaxerxes II Mnemon given by Deinon (c. 360–340 BC) and Ctesias (Artexerxes II's physician) respectively. These derive from the Persian name Khshayarsha as do "Ahasuerus" ("(Arta)Xerxes") and the hypocorism "Arshu" for Artaxerxes II found on a contemporary inscription (LBAT 162). These sources thus arguably identify Ahasuerus as Artaxerxes II in light of the names used in the Hebrew and Greek sources and accords with the contextual information from Pseudo-Hecataeus and Berossus as well as agreeing with Al-Tabari and Masudi's placement of events.

== Book of Ezra ==
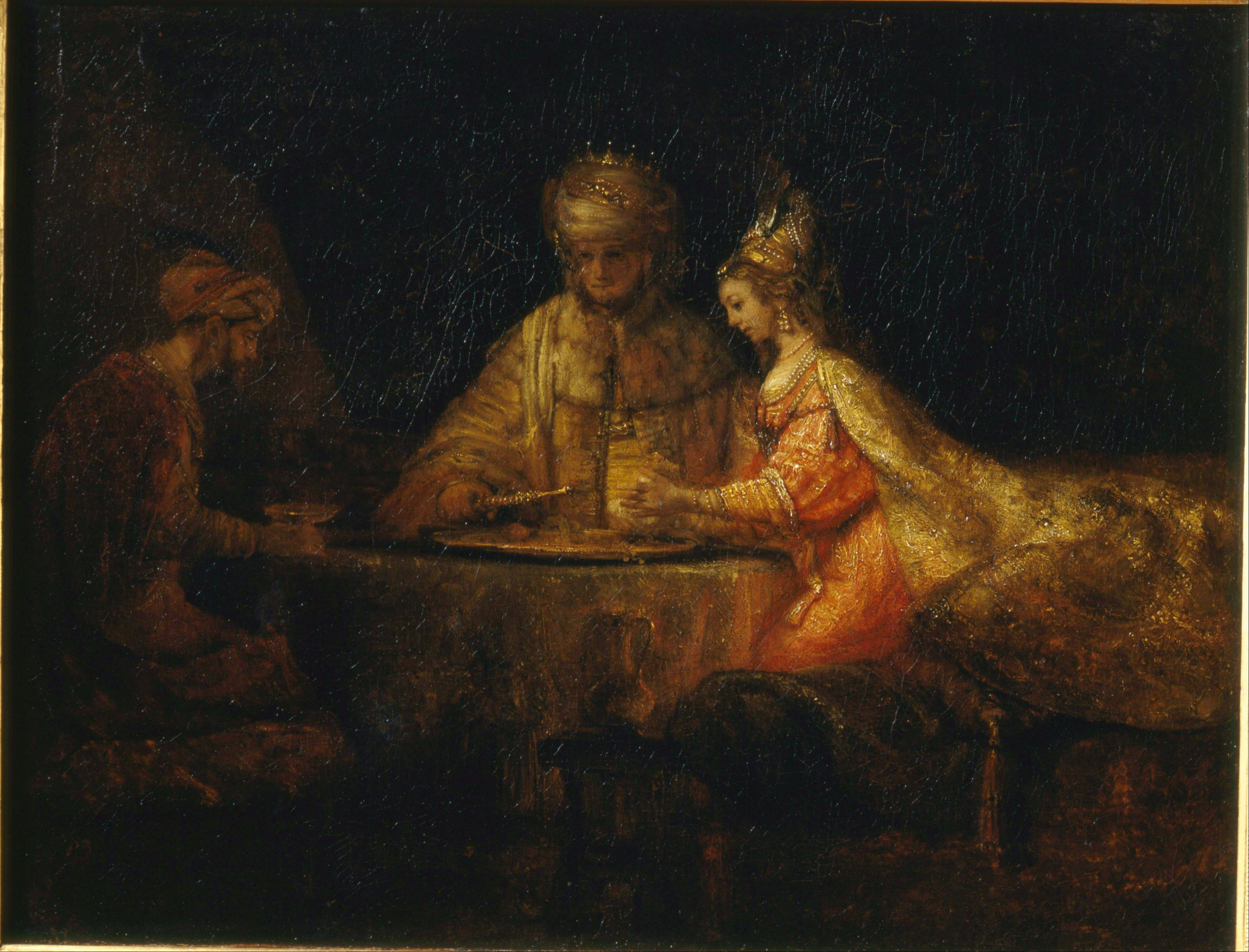
Ahasuerus and Haman at Esther's Feast, by Rembrandt

Ahasuerus is also given as the name of a King of Persia in the Book of Ezra. Modern commentators associate him with Xerxes I who reigned from 486 to 465 BC. Other identifications have been made for Cambyses II or with Bardiya (Greek Smerdis) who reigned (perhaps as an imposter) for seven months between Cambyses II and Darius I.

== Book of Daniel ==
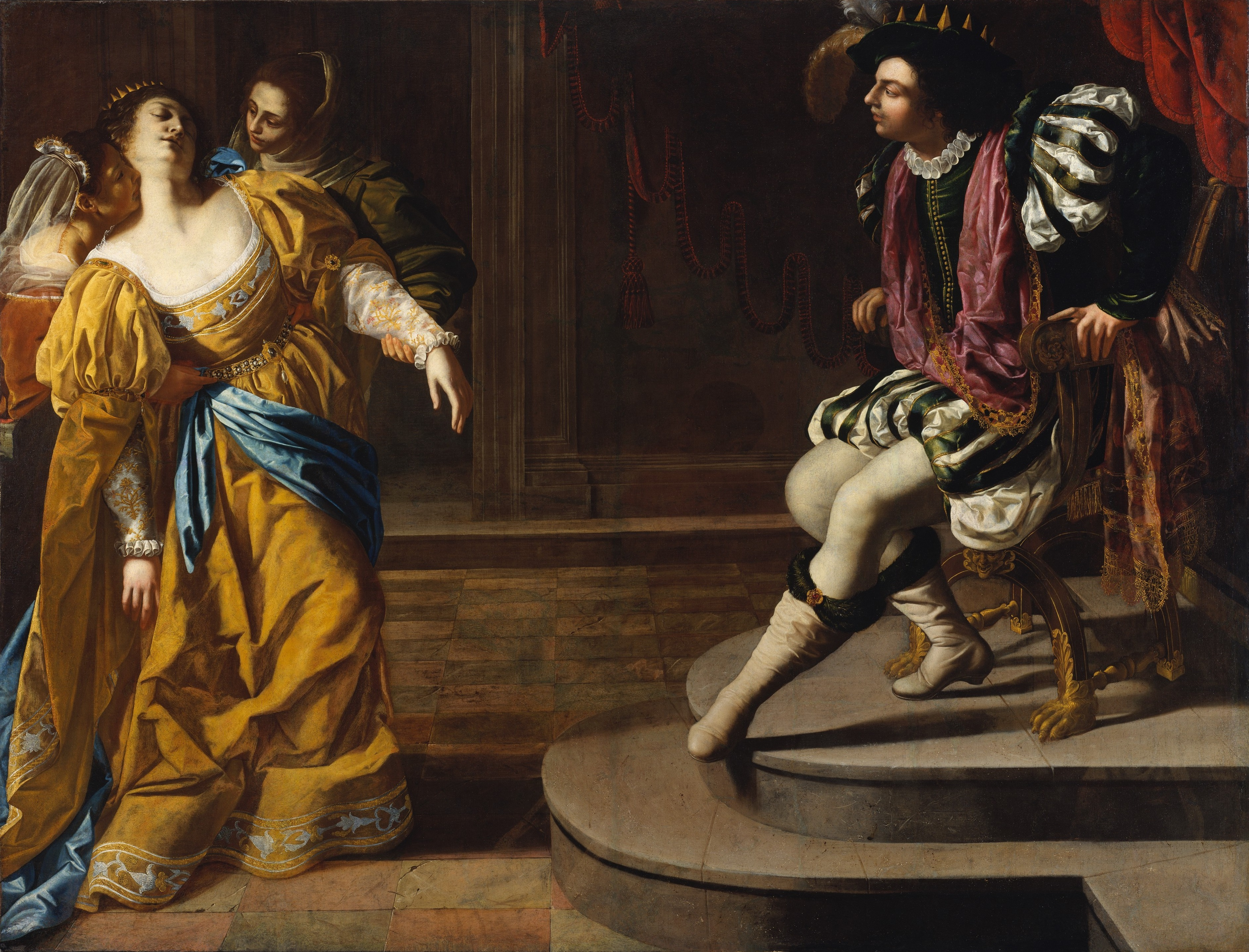
Esther Before Ahasuerus, Artemisia Gentileschi, c. 1630

Ahasuerus is given as the name of the father of Darius the Mede in the Book of Daniel. Josephus names Astyages as the father of Darius the Mede, and the description of the latter as uncle and father-in-law of Cyrus by mediaeval Jewish commentators matches that of Cyaxares II, who is said to be the son of Astyages by Xenophon. Thus this Ahasuerus is commonly identified with Astyages. He is alternatively identified, together with the Ahasuerus of the Book of Tobit, as Cyaxares I, said to be the father of Astyages. Views differ on how to reconcile the sources in this case.

Most scholars view Darius the Mede as a literary fiction, or possibly a conflation of Darius the Great with prophecies about the Medes.

== Book of Tobit ==
In some versions of the deuterocanonical Book of Tobit, Ahasuerus is given as the name of an associate of Nebuchadnezzar, who, together with him, destroyed Nineveh just before Tobit's death. A traditional Catholic view is that he is identical to the Ahasuerus of Daniel 9:1 In the Codex Sinaiticus Greek (LXX) edition, the two names in this verse appear instead as one name, Ahikar (also the name of another character in the story of Tobit). Other Septuagint texts have the name Achiachar. Western scholars have proposed that Achiachar is a variant form of the name "Cyaxares I of Media", who historically did destroy Nineveh, in 612 BC.

== In legends ==
In some versions of the legend of the Wandering Jew, his true name is held to be Ahasuerus – even though the biblical king is not described as a Jew and nothing in the Biblical account of him is similar to that myth. This is the name by which Immanuel Kant refers to the Wandering Jew in The Only Possible Argument in Support of a Demonstration of the Existence of God.

== Sources ==
- Hill, Andrew E. (2009). "Daniel-Malachi". In Longman, Tremper; Garland, David E. (eds.). The Expositor's Bible Commentary. Vol. 8. Zondervan. ISBN 9780310590545.
