= Esther Before Ahasuerus (Tintoretto) =

Painting by Jacopo Tintoretto

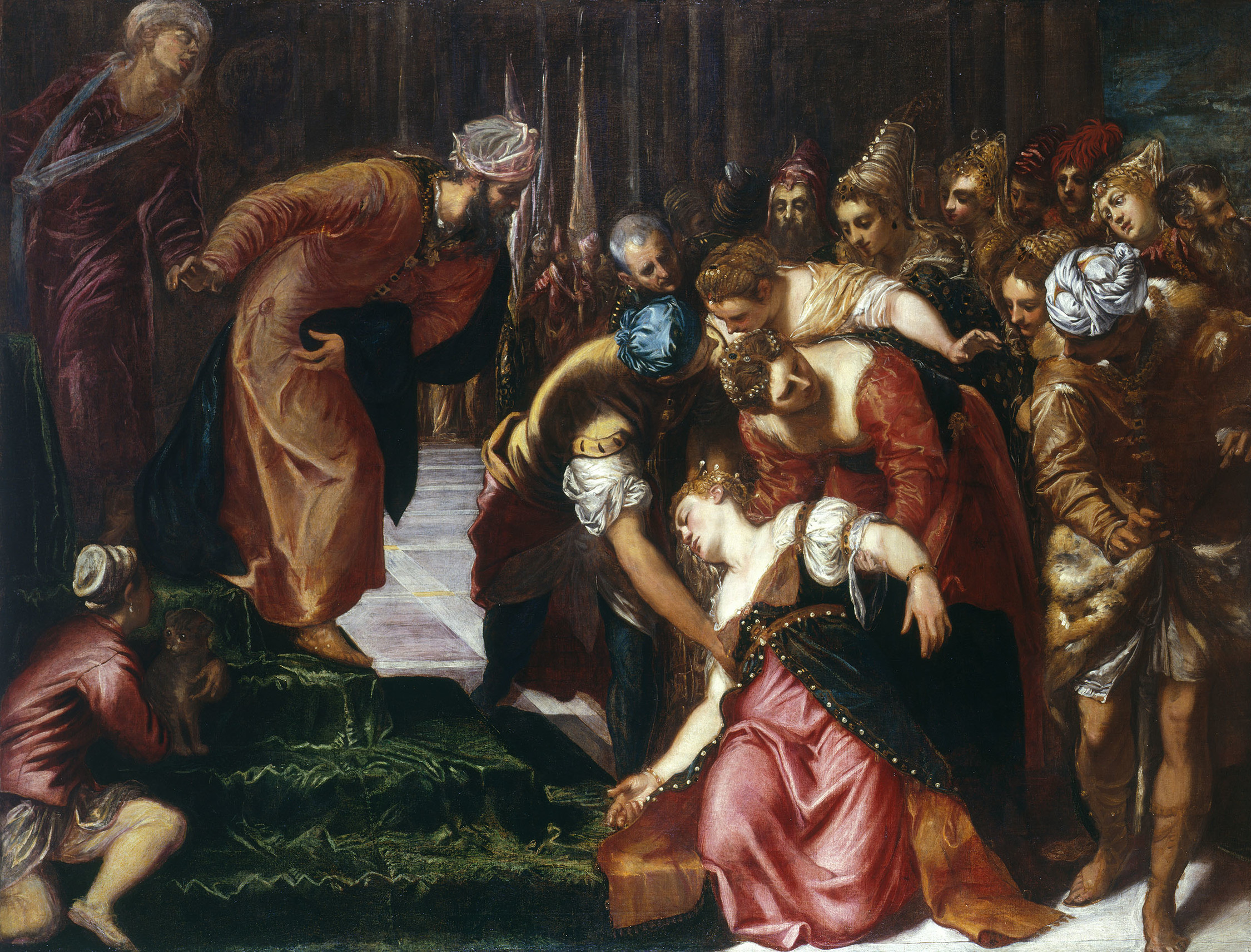
- Artist: Tintoretto
- Year: 1546–47
- Medium: Oil on canvas
- Dimensions: 207.7 cm × 275.5 cm (81.8 in × 108.5 in)
- Location: Kensington Palace, London
- Owner: Royal Collection
- Accession: RCIN 407247
- Website: Royal Collection

Esther Before Ahasuerus is a large painting of 1546–47 by the Venetian painter Tintoretto showing a scene from the Greek addition to the Book of Esther, in which Queen Esther faints during a bold intervention with her husband King Ahasuerus of Persia. In oil on canvas, it measures 207.7 by 275.5 centimetres (81.8 in × 108.5 in). Since the 1620s it has been in the Royal Collection of the United Kingdom, and in 2019 it hung in the King's Gallery in Kensington Palace, London.

The degree of finish varies considerably between different parts of the painting, which, with the intense colours and dramatic contrasts in lighting, is characteristic of Venetian painting. The orange-yellow pigment orpiment in the robe of the king has altered; it would originally have matched the biblical description of his splendid gold robe.

The painting is dated, largely on stylistic grounds, to about 1546–47, relatively early in Tintoretto's career, when he was still in his late twenties. It comes shortly before his first major commission, Saint Mark Rescuing the Slave, now in the Accademia, Venice.

== The incident ==
The account of the episode including Esther's fainting comes only from the Greek additions to the Book of Esther, or "Rest of Esther", which are Deuterocanonical books, regarded as canonical by the Catholic Church, though relegated to the Biblical apocrypha by Protestant churches. In the Hebrew Bible and Protestant bibles there is no fainting in the Book of Esther; in the latter the additions made in the Septuagint are relegated to the Rest of Esther placed at the end of the book. The decree at the Catholic Council of Trent confirming their canonical status was passed in April 1546, around the time this painting is thought to have been made, which may have a bearing on the choice of subject. The painting shows the moment from Chapter 9:6–8, when Esther goes to see her husband, King Ahasuerus of Persia (often identified as the historical Xerxes I), to intercede for the Jewish people; going into the inner royal court uninvited is punishable by death:

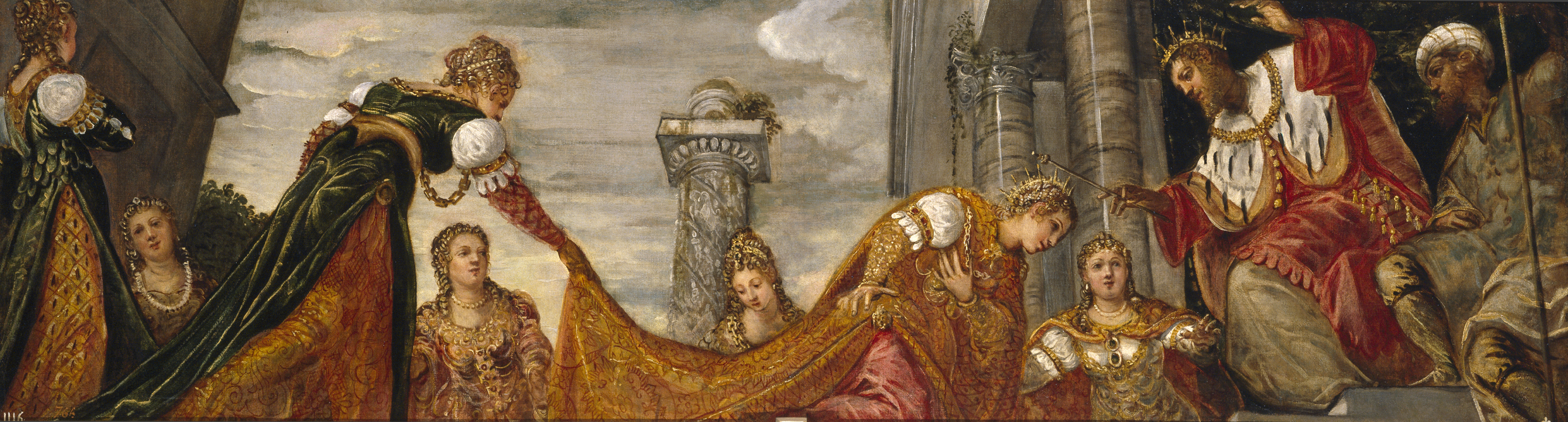
Another treatment by Tintoretto (now Prado), 1550s.

6 Then having passed through all the doors, she stood before the king, who sat upon his royal throne, and was clothed with all his robes of majesty, all glittering with gold and precious stones; and he was very dreadful.
7 Then lifting up his countenance that shone with majesty, he looked very fiercely upon her: and the queen fell down, and was pale, and fainted, and bowed herself upon the head of the maid that went before her.
8 Then God changed the spirit of the king into mildness, who in a fear leaped from his throne, and took her in his arms, till she came to herself again, and comforted her with loving words....

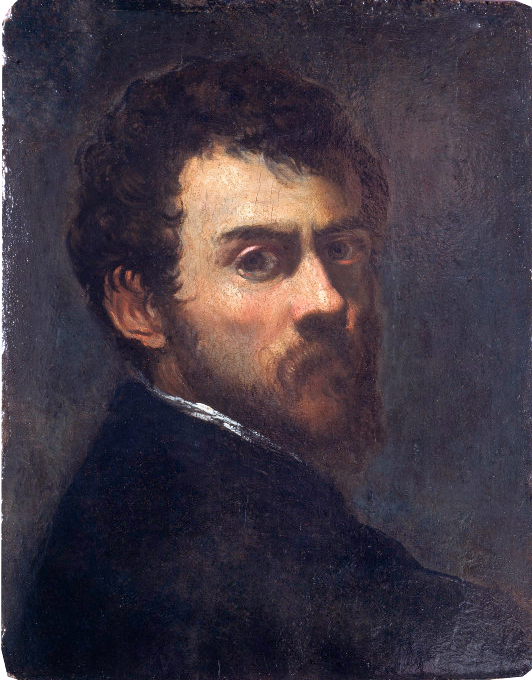
Tintoretto self-portrait, c. 1548, Victoria & Albert Museum.

Esther's faint had not often been depicted in art before Tintoretto, although for example it is shown in the series of cassone scenes of the Life of Esther by Sandro Botticelli, from the 1470s. Esther was regarded in Catholic theology as a typological forerunner of the Virgin Mary; among other reasons, because both acted as intercessors, and because Esther being allowed an exception to the strict Persian law on uninvited entry to the king's presence was seen as paralleling the unique Immaculate Conception of Mary. Contemporary viewers would probably have recognised a similarity between the faint and the motif of the Swoon of the Virgin, which was very common in depictions of the Crucifixion of Jesus. The fainting became a much more popular subject in the Baroque painting of the following century, with examples including the Esther Before Ahasuerus by Artemisia Gentileschi.

== Changes to the composition ==
The composition has seen a number of changes, the earliest by Tintoretto himself, to the figures behind the king. What appears now probably represents Tintoretto's initial intention, but in the course of painting he abandoned the two figures standing behind the king, a tall twisting one with a long scarf who was presumably Haman, and what is now a very dim outline of a turbaned companion. Instead Tintoretto overpainted these with a boy in armour. This stage can be seen in a workshop copy in El Escorial, and a print made in 1712 after the Royal Collection painting. The Escorial version also extends the composition to both sides, and very slightly at the top and bottom, adding one and a half figures at the right, and showing the full leg and foot of the boy with a dog at left.

It appears that at this stage the group of rather distant background figures to the right of the king were added; these appear to be Haman and his companion, with similar scarf and turban to their overpainted figures, standing with soldiers carrying banners.

At some point after this a restorer removed the boy in armour, probably damaging the turbaned man. The figures revealed were perhaps thought unsatisfactory, so either this or another restorer re-added the boy in armour, though the new figure was "clearly of inferior quality". This stage can be seen in old photographs. In 1950 a proposal by the restorer Sebastian Isepp to remove the new boy in armour was agreed, leaving the figures as they now appear. Haman is therefore depicted twice in the painting as it now appears.

== Provenance ==
The painting's original owner is unknown. It would probably have been made for a secular setting, despite the religious subject. It is recorded in the inventory of the collection of Guglielmo Gonzaga, Duke of Mantua in 1627 as hanging alongside The Muses in a passage in the Palazzo Ducale in Mantua. It was acquired from the Gonzaga collection by Charles I. On his execution it was valued at £120 and sold, before being reacquired by the royal family on the Restoration.
