= The Muses (painting) =

Painting by Jacopo Tintoretto

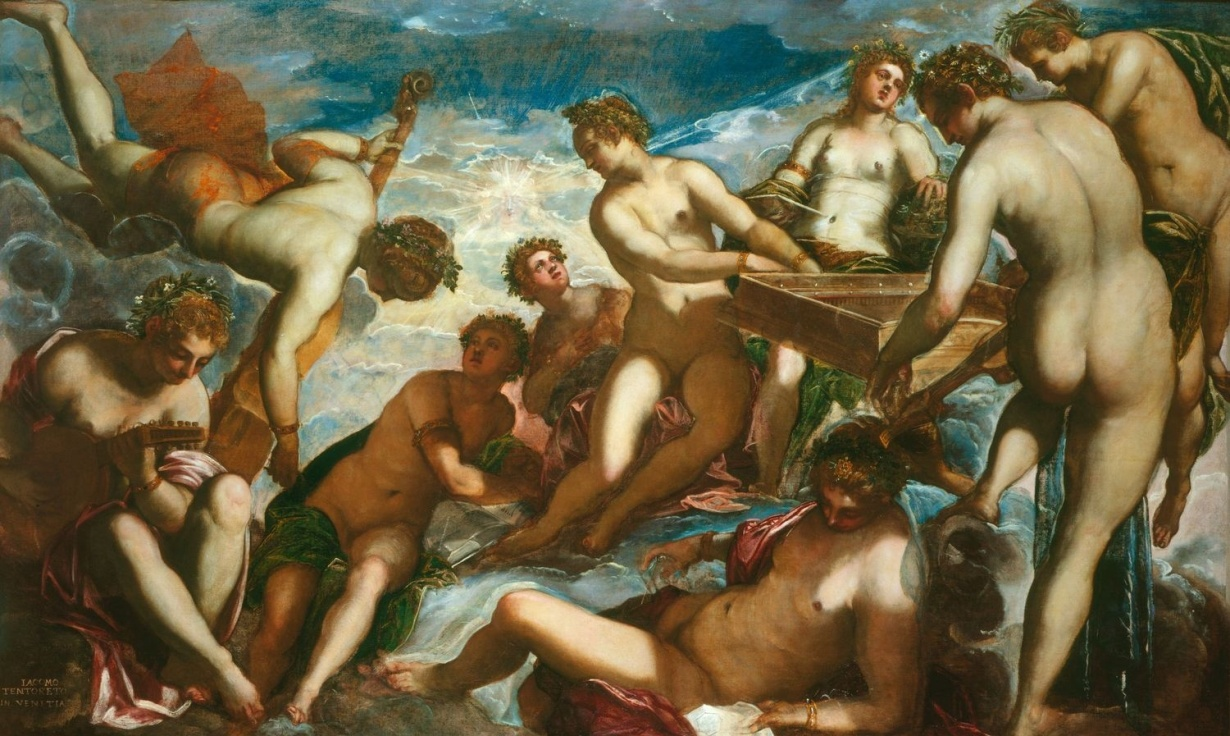
- Artist: Tintoretto
- Year: 1578
- Dimensions: 206 cm × 310.3 cm (81 in × 122.2 in)
- Location: King's Gallery, Kensington Palace; London
- Owner: Royal Collection
- Accession: RCIN 405476
- Website: Royal Collection

The Muses is a 1578 painting by Tintoretto showing the Muses from Greek mythology.

It is recorded in the inventory of the collection of Guglielmo Gonzaga, Duke of Mantua in 1627 as hanging alongside Esther Before Ahasuerus in a passage in the Palazzo Ducale in Mantua. It was acquired from the Gonzagas by Charles I of Great Britain. On his execution it was valued at £80 and sold, before being reacquired by the royal family on the Restoration. It now hangs in Kensington Palace.

== See also ==
- Muses in popular culture
