= Muses in popular culture =

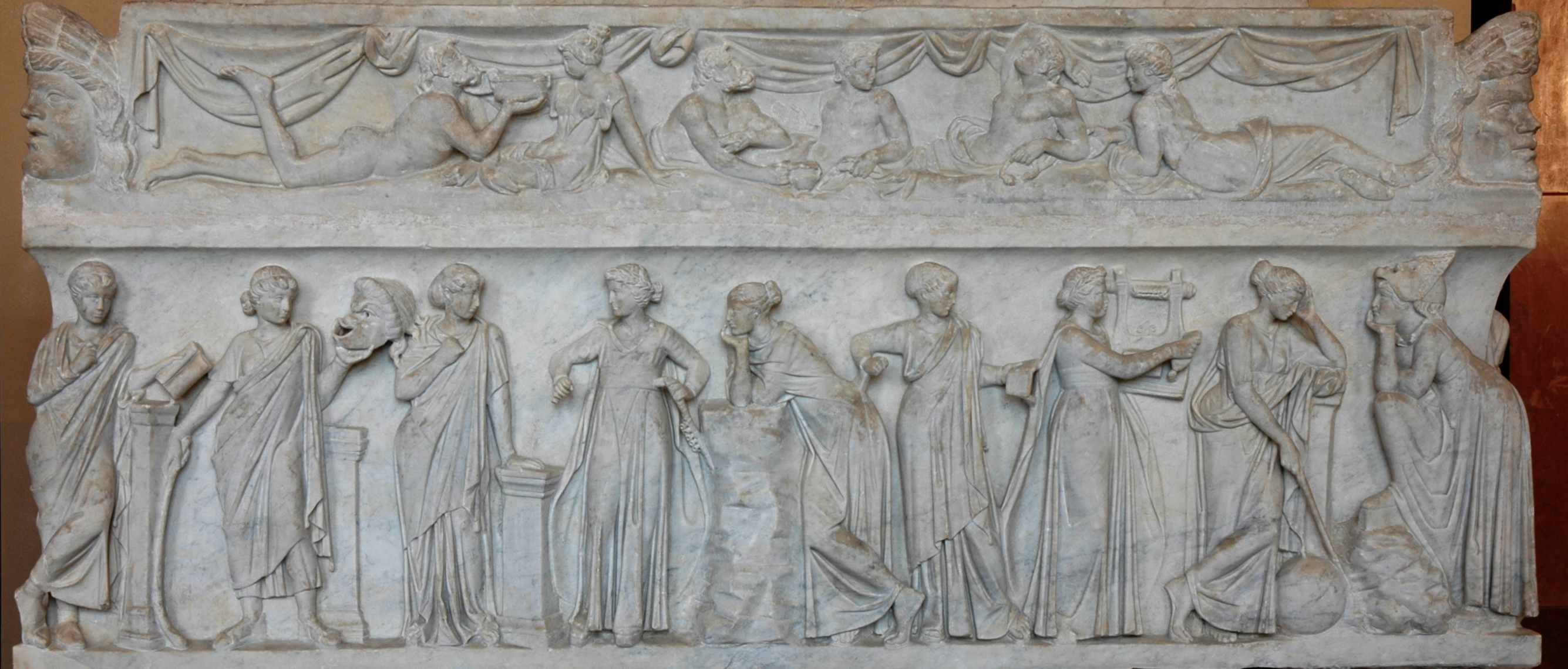
Sarcophagus known as the "Sarcophagus of the Muses", representing the nine Muses and their attributes. Marble, first half of the 2nd century AD; found by the Via Ostiense. From left to right: Calliope, who holds a scroll; Thalia, holding a comic mask; Terpsichore, Muse of dance; Euterpe, holds a double flute; Polymnia, leans on a rock; Clio, has a writing-tablet; Erato, holds a cithara; Urania, muse of astronomy, is shown with a globe at her feet; and Melpomene, wears a tragic mask.

Representations or analogues of one or more of the nine Muses of Greek mythology have appeared in many different modern fictional works.

The list of Muses comprises:

1. Calliope, the Muse of epic poetry
2. Clio, the Muse of history
3. Erato, the Muse of love poetry
4. Euterpe, the Muse of music
5. Melpomene, the Muse of tragedy
6. Polyhymnia, the Muse of hymns
7. Terpsichore, the Muse of dance
8. Thalia, the Muse of comedy
9. Urania/Ourania, the Muse of astronomy

== The Nine Muses ==
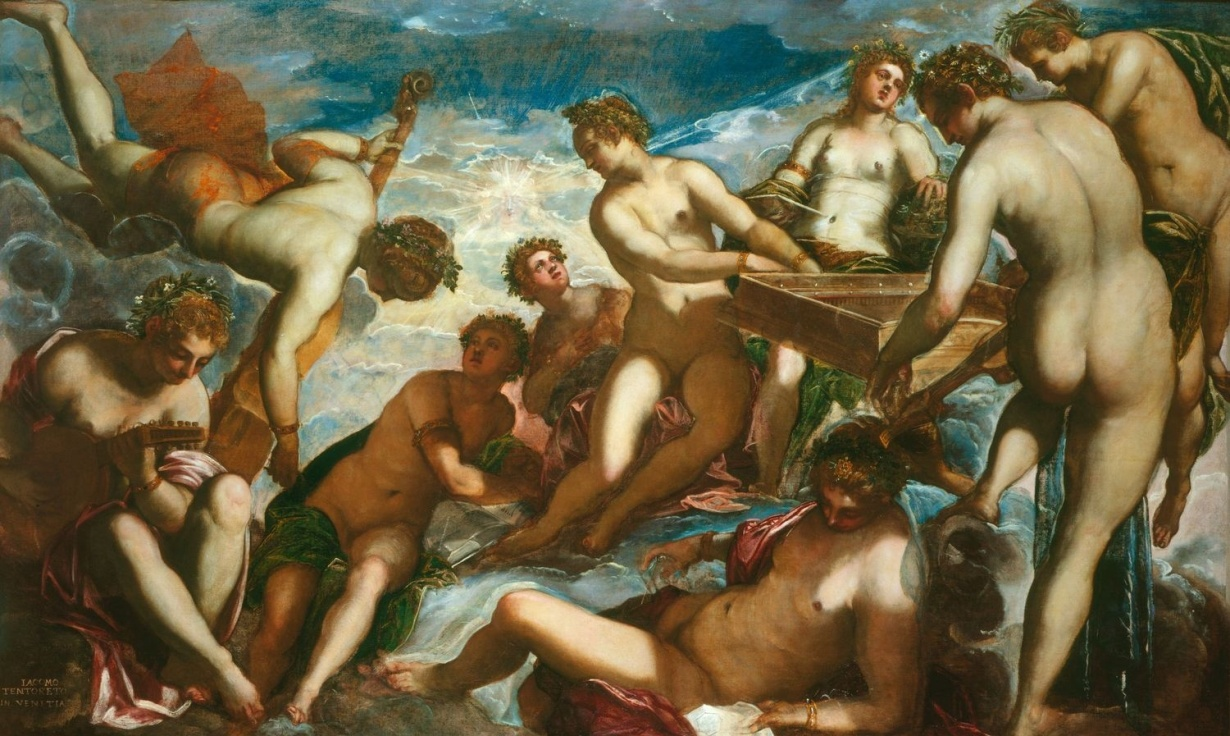
The Muses, 1578, by Tintoretto

=== Literature ===
- The Muses are mentioned several times throughout Percy Jackson and the Olympians, The Heroes of Olympus and The Trials of Apollo.

=== Popular music ===
- In 2010, a South Korean all-female idol group debuted under the name 'Nine Muses'.

=== Film and television ===
- In the 1947 film Down to Earth (a sequel to the 1941 classic Here Comes Mr. Jordan), Rita Hayworth's Terpsichore asks to be sent to Earth to help/hinder a Broadway producer's musical, "Swinging the Muses," based on 'her' life - but portraying her poorly in the process. All nine Muses are seen on Mount Parnassus; on Earth, Terpsichore adopts the name "Kitty Pendleton".
- The 1980 film Xanadu (and the 2007 musical Xanadu based on it) are a fantasy musical revolving around Terpsichore inspiring an artist and a businessman to create a roller-skating rink/disco. The film starred Olivia Newton-John and, in his last film appearance, Gene Kelly.
- In the anime series Love Live! School Idol Project, the musical group, μ's, is named after the Muses, and there are nine members, just as there are nine Muses.
- In the anime series Kiddy Grade, several sister ships to those of the main characters are named for Muses, including Calliope, Clio, Terpsichore, Erato, Euterpe, Thalia, and Polyhymnia.
- In the 2017 film Muse, a writer is inspired by several Muses.
- In "Muse to My Ear", a 2001 season 4 episode of the television supernatural drama Charmed, the Charmed Ones must protect the Muses from a warlock who is trapping them into a magical ring.
- In the Season 9 episode "Threshold" of The Waltons (series set in time 1933 to 1946), John Boy considers using the Muses as a presentation to promote a new department of television at his college.

=== Celebrations and events ===
- In New Orleans, Louisiana, there is an all-women Mardi Gras "krewe" called Krewe of Muses. Their motto is "Happy are they, whom the Muses love," a nod to the quote from Hesiod.

== Calliope ==
=== Literature ===
- The Muse Calliope is a character in the graphic novel Sandman, by Neil Gaiman. Her story, "Calliope" is in the 1990 trade paperback Dream Country. According to the comic's canon, Calliope was the youngest (rather than the eldest) Muse as well as a one-time lover of Dream, by whom she bore Orpheus.
- She is referenced in the 1923 poem "Aci sosi pe vremuri" ("Here arrived long ago") by Romanian poet Ion Pillat.
- A character from the internet fiction series Homestuck is named Calliope, with which they are designated the title; "Muse of Space". She is depicted as a shy girl who has a fervent hunger for knowledge on the epic she is contained within, in reference to the muse Calliope being the muse of epic poetry.

=== Film and television ===
- Calliope features in the 1997 Walt Disney Pictures film Hercules, appearing alongside the Muses Clio, Melpomene, Terpsichore, and Thalia, who collectively serve as a Greek chorus. The tallest of the five, Calliope sometimes acts as de facto leader and spokeswoman for the others. She was voiced by Tony Award winner Lillias White, who reprised the role in the subsequent TV series.
- In the 2002 episode "Out of Sync" from the animated series Cyberchase, Calliope plays her lyre and she is one of the four Mount Olympus band members with Apollo the Greek god of music (who plays the gong), Himaropa the siren (who plays the French horn), and the Beast (who plays the drums).
- In the 2014 season 10 episode of Supernatural, "Fan Fiction", Calliope appears as the antagonist.
- In the 2022 Netflix series The Sandman, Calliope is played by Greek-Canadian actress Melissanthi Mahut.
- In the DC comics-based television series Titans there is an AI called Calliope.
- In the TV show Dietland (2018) The feminist collective of peaceful resistance is called “Calliope House”. When Plum has a date and talks about it she says “what does calliope even mean, anyway?” He says “a clown, I think.”

=== Video games ===
- Calliope appears as a major character in Stray Gods: The Roleplaying Musical.
- Calliope appears as a Kratos’ daughter in the God of War franchise.

=== Popular culture ===
- VTuber Mori Calliope shares her given name with the Muse Calliope. Mori Calliope is a member of the Hololive Production's English Branch and is a Rapper, as poetry is the foundation of rap this may explain the origin of her name.

== Clio ==
- In Batman: The Animated Series, Clio is the name of criminal mastermind Maxie Zeus's girlfriend and assistant. Maxie suffers from a god complex, believing that he is the Greek god Zeus and that his girlfriend is the muse Clio.
- The Cleo of Alpha Chi literary society at Trinity College is named after Clio.
- Clio features in the 1997 Walt Disney Pictures film Hercules, appearing alongside the muses Calliope, Melpomene, Terpsichore and Thalia, who collectively serve as a Greek chorus. She was voiced by Vaneese Thomas, who reprised the role in the subsequent TV series.
- Clio (also known as "Kira") is the lead character in the 2007 musical Xanadu, which is based on the 1980 film of the same name. She was played by Kerry Butler in the original Broadway production.
- The muse Clio is a character in Piers Anthony's Xanth series. She features as the protagonist in the 2004 book Currant Events.
- The muse Clio is a main supporting character in Jodi Taylor's The Chronicles of St. Mary's series – using the name "Mrs. Partridge" as a cover while working as the personal assistant to Dr. Bairstowe. Her true identity as Clio is known only by the series protagonist Dr. Maxwell.
- In the 2017 film Wonder Woman, Wonder Woman refers to Clio as the name of the author of the 12 volumes of Treatises on Bodily Pleasure.

== Erato ==
- Erato is a character in the 2007 musical Xanadu, which is based on the 1980 film of the same name. She was played by Kenita R. Miller in the original Broadway production.

== Euterpe ==
- In the anime series Guilty Crown, main character Inori Yuzuriha is best known for her song "Euterpe".
- Euterpe is one of the 50 Spacer worlds in Isaac Asimov's Robot Series. It features a small moon called Gemstone.
- In a cantata by Strozzi Barbara, the composer puts her songs around the muse.
- In the Brazilian musical teen TV series Vicky and the Muse, Euterpe is one of the main characters, being summoned to inspire a girl who wants to sing.

== Melpomene ==
=== Literature ===
- Melpomene is a main character in the French novella Anathemae by Emilio Bouzamondo. She is the origin of the tragedy of the main characters. She appears with a billy goat at her side.
- The "Melpomene Moon" is mentioned several times in the modern fantasy adventure series "The Librarians: The Next Chapter" season 1 episode "And the Graffiti of the Gods". The episode revolves around a Hermione, young Greco-American woman and her grandmother who are descendants of the Muses. Hermione suddenly gains a talent for art, as well as the ability to bring it to life with magic. Her new talent for art and magic are not only her inheritance, but brought on by the celestial appearance of the "Melpomene Moon."

=== Popular music ===
- Melpomene is a song by The Dear Hunter from the 2016 album Act V: Hymns with the Devil in Confessional.

=== Theater ===
- Melpomene is a character in the 2007 musical Xanadu, which is based on the 1980 film of the same name. She was played by Mary Testa in the original Broadway production.

=== Film and television ===
- Melpomene features in the 1997 Walt Disney Pictures film Hercules, appearing alongside the muses Calliope, Clio, Terpsichore and Thalia, who collectively serve as a Greek chorus. She was voiced by Broadway actress Cheryl Freeman, who reprised the role in the subsequent TV series.

=== Video games ===
- Melpomene is the primary companion to the player character in the 2021 indie game Disillusion and its prequel Disillusion ST (2024), developed by Rick Tempest. Within the narrative, she accompanies the protagonist, Golem, and plays a central role in the game's story and progression. She is depicted nude, with green plant-like markings covering her body and long dark hair. The games incorporate surreal elements and draw on themes associated with Buddhism and Hinduism.

== Polyhymnia ==
- Polyhymnia is one of the main characters in the 1955 Tom Puss story De Muzenis.
- The protagonist of Madeleine L'Engle's Polly O'Keefe novels is named after the muse Polyhymnia.

== Terpsichore ==
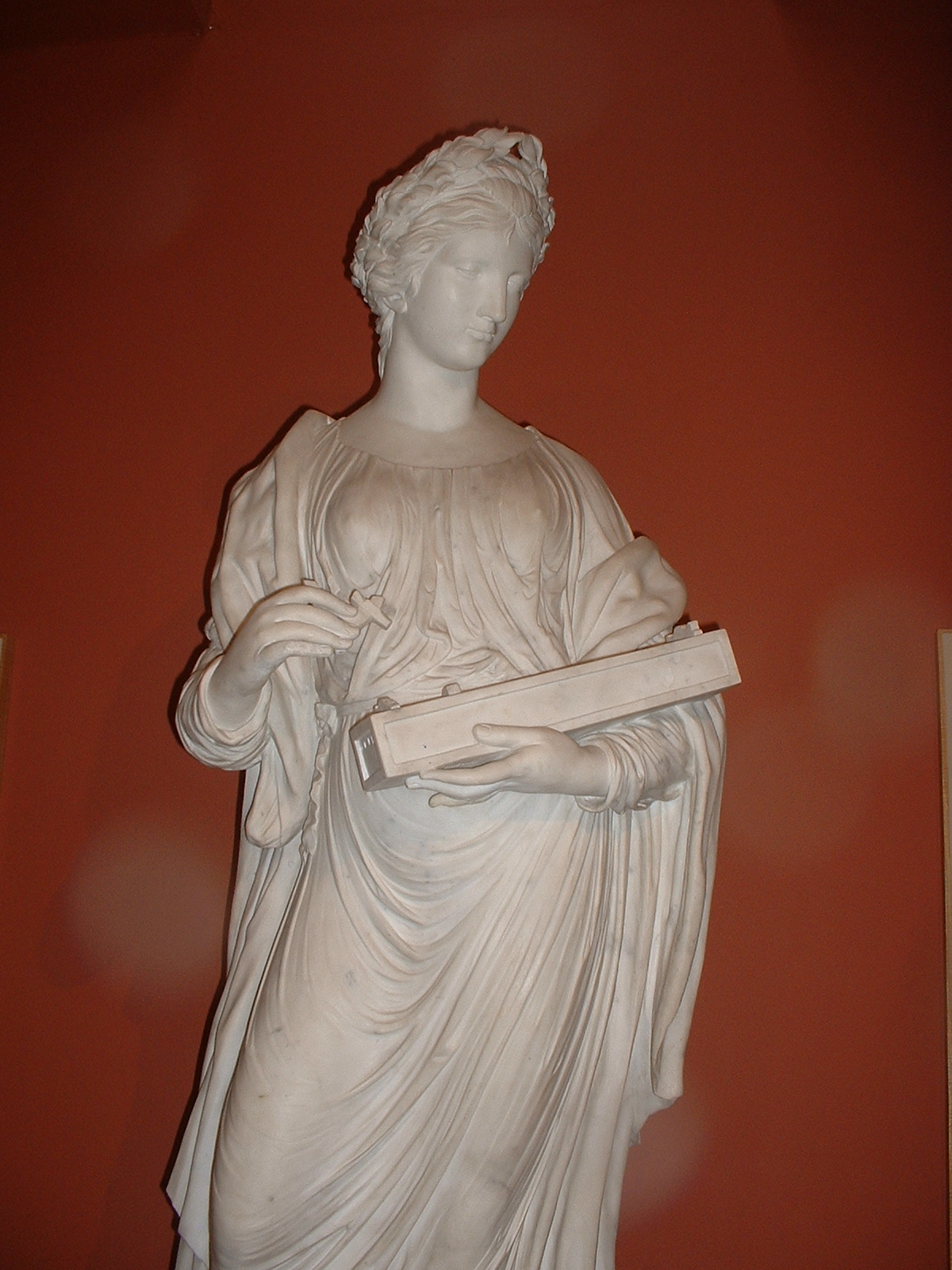
Terpsichore holding an Aeolian harp. Sculpted in marble by John Walsh in 1771.

=== Literature ===
- In Daniel Quinn's 1997 novel My Ishmael, the fictional planet Terpsichore is a land ravished by dancing, with dancing paralleling the rise of agriculture on Earth. Dancing (in an unspecified manner) speeds up the growth of the natives' "favorite foods".

=== Film and television ===
- The muse Terpsichore is the protagonist in the 1947 film Down to Earth. She is portrayed by Rita Hayworth.
- "Terpsichorean" was a popular adjective in Victorian music hall hyperbole. The long-running BBC TV series The Good Old Days recreated this style, with Leonard Sachs playing a compère with a notable fondness for the word, and in the Monty Python Cheese Shop sketch, John Cleese's character denies complaining about the music with the line "Heaven forbid. I am one who delights in all manifestations of the Terpsichorean muse."
- In the 1980 film Xanadu, Olivia Newton-John plays Kira, another version of Terpsichore (but named 'Clio'), the muse of dancing and chorus, who inspires an artist Michael Beck and his bandleader friend Gene Kelly to open a nightclub.
- Terpsichore is mentioned in master poet Tony Harrison's 1992 Film-Poem The Gaze of the Gorgon: 'Terpsichore, the Muse who sees, her dances done by amputees'
- Terpsichore features in the 1997 Walt Disney Pictures film Hercules, appearing alongside the muses Calliope, Clio, Melpomene and Thalia, who collectively serve as a Greek chorus. She was voiced by Tony Award winner LaChanze, who reprised the role in the subsequent TV series. She had a prominent role in the episode "Hercules and the Muse of Dance", where she teaches Hercules to dance so he can pass in phys ed and be a better hero.
- In the 1998 anime series Cowboy Bebop, two characters take their names from the muse: Valeria Terpsichore and her unseen, but alluded to, husband Ural Terpsichore.

=== Theater ===
- Terpsichore is a character in the 2007 musical Xanadu, which is based on the 1980 film of the same name. Her part is always played by a man in drag. She was played by Andre Ward in the original Broadway production.

== Thalia ==
- The comic mask of Thalia featured in each title card of every Three Stooges short produced from the 1945 Idiots Deluxe until their final one in 1959, Sappy Bull Fighters.
- Thalia features in the 1997 Walt Disney Pictures film Hercules, appearing alongside the muses Calliope, Clio, Melpomene and Terpsichore, who collectively serve as a Greek chorus. Portrayed as short and plump, she has the deepest voice amongst the five Muses depicted. She was voiced by Roz Ryan, who reprised the role in the subsequent TV series.
- In a 2003 Static Shock episode "Hard as Nails", Harley Quinn uses the alias "Thalia".
- Thalia is a character in the 2007 musical Xanadu, which is based on the 1980 film of the same name. Her part is always played by a man in drag. She was played by Curtis Holbrook in the original Broadway production.
- The German bookstore chain Thalia is named after the muse.
- The Muse of Comedy was in the last episode of season two of The Mr. Peabody & Sherman Show, only it was a grotesque man named Phillip.

== Urania/Ourania ==
- In RuneScape, the Ourania Runecrafting Altar is found next to an observatory, a reference to her role as the muse of astronomy.
- Urania is the main protagonist of Book of Urania, a novel by Brendan_Myers

== See also ==
- The Muses (1578 painting by Tintoretto)
- Thalia Theatre (disambiguation)
