= Otto Zöckler =

German theologian (1833–1906)

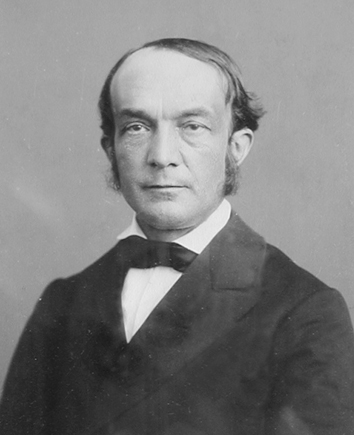
Otto Zöckler.

Otto Zöckler (27 May 1833, Grünberg, Hesse – 19 February 1906) was a German theologian, professor at Greifswald. He edited a Handbuch der theologischen Wissenschaft, and other works.

Quote from him: "The wise man is also the just, pious, the upright, the man who walks in the way of truth."

== Publications ==
- Ecclesiastes, or Koheleth - 1870
- Commentary on the Book of Job, Vol 8 in Lange's Commentary on the Holy Scriptures - 1872
- The Cross of Christ: Studies in the History of Religion and the Inner Life of the Church - 1877
