= Cyaxares II =

King of the Medes

Cyaxares II (Ancient Greek: Κυαξάρης) was a king of the Medes whose reign is described by the Greek historian Xenophon. Some theories have equated this figure with the "Darius the Mede" named in the Book of Daniel. He is not mentioned in the histories of Herodotus or Ctesias, and many scholars doubt that he actually existed. The question of his existence impacts on whether the kingdom of the Medes merged peacefully with that of the Persians in about 537 BC, as narrated by Xenophon (8.6.22, 8.7.1), or was subjugated in the rebellion of the Persians against Cyrus' grandfather in 559 BC, a date derived from Herodotus (1.214) and almost universally accepted by current scholarship.

== Xenophon’s Cyropaedia ==
According to Xenophon's Cyropaedia (1.5.2), Cyaxares II became king after Astyages to the throne of the Median Empire, and he was also the brother of Mandane, Cyrus the Great's mother (1.2.1, 1.4.7). He describes the Persian, Cyrus II/The Great, as leading the campaign to conquer Babylon in 539 BC, while his uncle, Cyaxares II, remained in Ecbatana. Cyaxares II was by then an old man, and because Cyrus II/The Great was in command of the campaign, the army came to regard Cyrus the Great as king. After Cyrus II/The Great invited Cyaxares (II) to a palace he had prepared for him in Babylon, Cyaxares (II) granted him his daughter (Cyrus II/The Great's first cousin) in marriage, with the Median kingdom as her dowry. On the assumption that Cyaxares II is Darius the Mede, it is claimed that he nominally reigned from Babylon as head of the Medo-Persian empire for two years until his death, the real power being Cyrus II/The Great's. Upon the death of Cyaxares II, the empire passed peaceably to Cyrus II/The Great.

=== Controversy about name ===
Friedrich König claimed that Xenophon was confused about Cyaxares (II) because this was the name of the father of Astyages (Cyaxares I). However, it was not unusual, especially among kings, for an individual to have the same name as his grandfather. This was the case with both Cyrus the Great and Cambyses II. Darius (I) Hystaspes had a grandson named Darius who was heir apparent but was killed before he could become king.

== Debate about existence of Cyaxares II ==
Cyaxares II figures prominently in Xenophon’s Cyropaedia. In contrast, he is absent from the Histories of Herodotus, which leaves no place for Cyaxares II. Herodotus says the Median king Astyages had no son, and that his successor as king of both Media and Persia was Cyrus the Great. The modern consensus of historians agrees with Herodotus. John Whitcomb wrote that Xenophon's Cyaxares II "was a mere figment of the imagination."

From at least the time of Jerome until the 19th century, many writers, both Jewish and Christian, accepted the existence of Cyaxares II. He was regarded as the king of Media at the end of the Neo-Babylonian Empire in the biblical commentaries of John Calvin, Adam Clarke, Keil and Delitzsch, and Lange. In Lange's commentary, Otto Zöckler named Gesenius, Hengestenberg, and other more recent writers who equated Cyaxares II with Daniel's Darius the Mede. These commentaries noted similarities between Cyaxares II as portrayed by Xenophon and what may be inferred about Darius the Mede from the sparse statements about him in the Book of Daniel. In their view, the difference in name could be explained by the fact that kings at that time—including Artaxerxes I, Darius II, Artaxerxes III, and Darius III—had a throne name in addition to their personal name. In the case of Cyaxares II, Harpocration and Berossus were cited as evidence showing that the throne name of Cyaxares II was Darius the Mede. Regarding correlations between Cyaxares II and Darius the Mede, Zöckler wrote, "the account given by Xenophon regarding Cyaxares II so fully agrees with the narrative of Daniel regarding Darius the Mede, that, as Hitzig confesses, 'the identity of the two is beyond a doubt.'"

== Supporting evidence ==
The following sources generally support, in one way or another, the existence of Cyaxares II as a monarch who succeeded Astyages on the throne of Media, and who continued until sometime shortly after the capture of Babylon by the combined Median and Persian armies and their allies. The sources are listed in chronological order of their composition, with the oldest first.

=== The Harran Stele ===
The Harran Stele (Pritchard, pp. 362–63) was composed in the fourteenth or fifteenth year of Nabonidus, i.e. 542 to 540 BC, commemorating his restoration of the temple at Ehulhul. Nabonidus relates how, in the tenth year of his reign (546 or 545 BC), hostile kings invited him to return to Babylon. The kings are named as "the kings of the land of Egypt, of the land [v.l. for KUR: URU, of the city] of the Medes, of the land of the Arabs, and all the kings of hostile (lands)". The significance of this lies in its date, just one to three years before Nabonidus lost his kingdom to the Medes and Persians. It was also some 13 or 14 years after Cyrus had supposedly subjugated the Medes and became ruler of the combined empire in 559 B.C. according to Herodotus and the consensus of modern historians who follow him. Nabonidus makes no mention of the Persians who soon would be the leaders of those who captured his capital. This is consistent with Xenophon's picture of the Persians still being the subordinate partner in the Medo-Persian confederacy at the time, with Cyrus the junior sovereign under his uncle, Cyaxares II king of Media. Nowhere in any surviving inscription is Cyrus called the king of Media, unless it is maintained that the present inscription is interpreted that way; this would be in contradiction to other sources where Cyrus is referred to "king of Anshan", "king of Persia", "the great king" and other similar titles. The Harran Stele therefore is evidence that just shortly before the fall of Babylon, the king of the Medes, whose name is not given, not only existed but was considered a more important enemy of the Babylonians than Cyrus and the Persians.

=== The Persepolis Reliefs ===
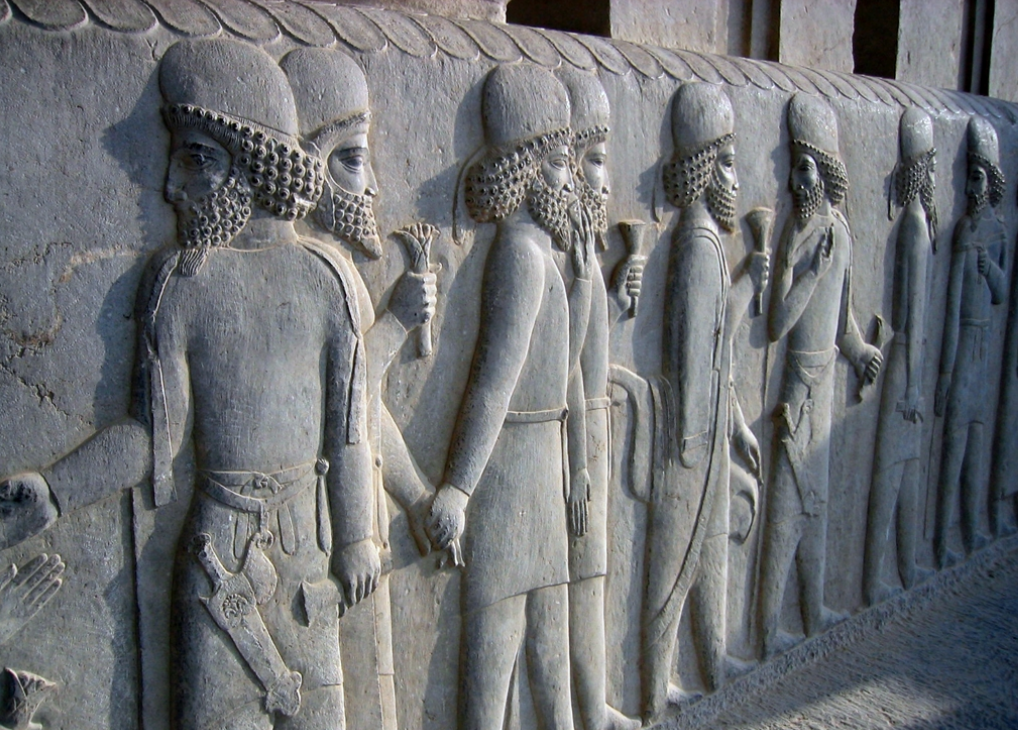
Frieze statues depicting Persian and Median nobleman in friendly conversation.

Construction of the Persian city of Persepolis began early in the reign of Darius I (522–486 BC), probably about 515 BC, and construction was completed in the reign of his son Xerxes (486–465 BC). The great staircase of the Apadana was part of the first building phase. Reliefs on part of the staircase depict Persian and Median nobles, with no apparent distinction of rank. Depiction of Persians and Medians as equals is not consistent with Herodotus' account that the Persians "subjugated" and made "slaves" of the Medes about 20 years before the fall of Babylon (Histories 1.129,130). They are consistent with the picture presented in the Cyropaedia of a confederation between the two nations, with the Medes initially being the senior partners in the confederacy.

=== Aeschylus in The Persians ===
Aeschylus' tragedy, The Persians, was written in 472 BC. The author, Aeschylus, was a contemporary of Darius Hystaspes (522–486 BC) and his son Xerxes (486–465). He fought the Persians at Marathon and Salamis. The Persians predates both Xenophon and Herodotus, and is therefore independent of either of those sources. The tragedy is a dramatic reenactment of the Persian defeat at Salamis (486 BC). In it, the ghost of Darius I describes the two Median kings who preceded Cyrus as rulers of the Medo-Persian alliance:

For the Mede was the first leader of [our] host;
And another, his son, completed this work,
For [his] mind directed his passion.
And third from him was Cyrus, a fortunate man;
When he ruled, he established peace for all his own.

In Herodotus' history, the two Median kings who preceded Cyrus were Cyaxares I and his son Astyages. But also according to Herodotus, Cyaxares I did not establish a Medo-Persian confederacy, and Astyages did not "complete this work"; instead he lost his throne after initiating a war against Cyrus. The conflict of Aeschylus with Herodotus regarding the basic history of the Medes and Persians is so obvious that Walther Kranz stated, "Certainly one could complain, that thus Aeschylus (like his hearers) knew nothing about the enormous revolution in the East regarding the changeover of the dominion to the Persians." Steven Anderson writes, "The attempt to reconcile Aeschylus with Herodotus thus breaks down, not only because of the problem of correlating the Median kings, but also because of the problem of a Medo-Persian confederacy. Aeschylus presents the Medes and Persians as a united host right from the first Median king in the list, and does not indicate that there was a violent conquest of Media by Cyrus, as Herodotus claims there was."

In the past, the interpretation taken by many classicists was that the two Median kings preceding Cyrus in this reference were Astyages and Xenophon's Cyaxares II. This was the position of Thomas Stanley, who edited what became the standard edition of the works of Aeschylus from the seventeenth to the nineteenth centuries. That the Medes under Astyages began a confederacy with the Persians, as indicated by Aeschylus, is evidenced by Astyages giving his daughter Mandane in marriage to Cambyses, the father of Cyrus by Mandane. This marriage alliance is attested in the histories of both Herodotus and Xenophon. "In the ancient Near Eastern context, such marriages signified the formation of political alliances, and it seems that Astyages made just such an alliance with Persia with a view toward checking Babylonian hegemony. The work which he began of opposing Babylonian hegemony through the confederation with Persia was completed by his son Darius/Cyaxares II, who occupied the Median throne when Babylon fell to the Medo-Persian army." Aeschylus in these few lines presents a picture of the early days of the Medo-Persian confederacy that is in harmony with Xenophon's succession of Median kings, including Cyaxares II.

=== Xenophon in the Cyropaedia ===
Xenophon was a mercenary soldier who fought in the Persian civil war between Cyrus the Younger and his brother Artaxerxes II of Persia. The story of the 10,000 Greek mercenaries is related in Xenophon's most famous work, the Anabasis. Xenophon fought on the side of Cyrus and greatly admired him. After Cyrus was slain, Xenophon became leader of the Greeks in their long trek out of the territory controlled by the Persians. Since he apparently was quite familiar with the younger Cyrus and his attendants, he had ample opportunity to learn the court remembrances of Cyrus the Great.

When Xenophon wrote his Cyropaedia (the Education of Cyrus) several years later, the Histories of Herodotus had already been published. Regarding the upbringing of Cyrus the Great, Herodotus said that he was choosing one of the stories he had heard, but that there were three other stories he did not choose to relate (1.95). The story he chose is adapted from myths that were current at the time. An integral part of Herodotus' story was his explanation of how Cyrus came to the throne of Persia. This was after he led a successful rebellion against his maternal grandfather Astyages, king of the Medes. Xenophon would have known this story from Herodotus, but he did not believe it, because his history of Cyrus' early years is quite different. Herodotus and Xenophon agree that Cyrus' mother was Mandane of Media, daughter of Astyages, but Herodotus says that Cyrus' father, Cambyses I, was not of "suitable rank" to be a king or the father of a king (1.07); however, Xenophon says that Cambyses was king of Persia. In contrast to Herodotus' having Cyrus lead a rebellion against his grandfather and seizing the throne of Media, Xenophon says Astyages died and was succeeded on the throne of Media by his son Cyaxares (II) some time before Cyrus—as prince regent of Persia and leader of their armies—began his campaign of conquest.

The discovery of the Cyrus Cylinder gave evidence that Herodotus was wrong regarding the ancestors of Cyrus and especially the rank of his father, Cambyses. Therein, Cyrus states that he is "son of Cambyses, great king, king of Anshan, grandson of Cyrus, great king, king of Anshan, descendant of Teispes, great king, king of Anshan, of a family (which) always (exercised) kingship" (Pritchard, p. 316).

=== Berossus in the Babyloniaca ===
Berossus was a Babylonian writer who produced a history of Babylon, the Babyloniaca, around 270 BC. The work was widely known in antiquity, but now survives only in fragments quoted by later writers. A fragment describing the conquest of Babylon by Cyrus is preserved in Josephus' Against Apion (1.150-53/1.20). In the Babyloniaca, Berossus dates the conquest to the seventeenth year of Nabonidus, in agreement with the cuneiform inscription of the Nabonidus Chronicle. This section of the Babyloniaca is also cited in the Chronicle of Eusebius, a work that survives only in an Armenian translation. Eusebius cites Abydenus, an epitomizer of Berossus, as his source. The fragment of Berossus preserved in Against Apion states that Cyrus gave Nabonidus the province of Carmania to live in. The Chronicle of Eusebius agrees with this, but its citation of Abydenus/Berossus adds: "To this one [Nabonidus] Cyrus gave, when he had taken Babylon, the governorship of the land of the Carmanians; [but] Darius the king took away some of the province for himself."

Berossus' statement mentions a king named Darius contemporary with Nabonidus. This might support a King Darius ruling at the time Cyrus conquered Babylon but it might also refer to Darius the Great (reigned 522–486), who might have reduced Nabonidus's province later on. This reference to the name Darius was used in the 19th century commentaries of Keil, Delitzsch, and Lange to assert that "Darius the Mede" in the Book of Daniel was attested in an ancient source.

=== Harpocration ===
Harpocration was a lexicographer who wrote in the latter half of the 2nd century AD. He was associated with the great library at Alexandria, and had access to many ancient resources that were lost when the library was destroyed. His only surviving work is The Lexicon of the Ten Orators. In an entry for the daric coin, he writes, "But darics are not named, as most suppose, after Darius the father of Xerxes, but for a certain other more ancient king." In the 19th century, C. F. Keil, in the Keil and Delitzsch commentary on the Hebrew Bible, cited the reference in Harpocration as evidence outside of the biblical Book of Daniel for the existence of Daniel's "Darius the Mede" as a historical figure.

== Conflicting evidence ==
=== Babylonian contract texts ===
There are thousands of examples of Babylonian contract documents written in cuneiform on clay, many of which are unpublished. Strassmaier published 384 contract texts dated to the reign of Cyrus, and others have been published since then. These documents provide the strongest argument against the existence of Cyaxares II, since none of those yet published contains that name. Rowley writes, "No imperial monarch interposed his rule between Nabonidus and Cyrus, for ere the month in which Cyrus entered Babylon had run its course, contracts were being dated by his reign."

According to the Cyropaedia (8.5.1,17), it was only after affairs were settled in Babylon that Cyrus went to Media and invited Cyaxares to come to Babylon, where he had prepared a palace for him. If that is the case, then the people of Babylon would have recognized Cyrus as their conqueror, not the distant Cyaxares. Steven Anderson, who advocates the basic outline of Xenophon, writes that Cyrus "was evidently hailed as the new king when he entered the city in a carefully choreographed procession, and his entrance was preceded and followed by a heavy propaganda campaign." Anderson also states, "It is not impossible that there may be cuneiform texts which mention Darius the Mede that have been mistakenly identified by modern scholars with one of the three Persian kings called 'Darius.' Any reference to Darius the Mede would have to be very explicit and otherwise unexplainable to be recognized as such by a conventional scholar."

=== The Cyrus Cylinder ===
The Cyrus Cylinder (Pritchard, pp. 315–16) is a barrel-shaped clay cylinder inscribed in Akkadian cuneiform. It appears to have been written sometime after the conquest of Babylon (539 BC) and before Cyrus' death in 530 BC. The Cyrus Cylinder was an important part of the evidence in conflict with Xenophon's account. Its text was interpreted as implying that the Persians conquered the Medes in warfare before the capture of Babylon, as narrated by Herodotus. It makes no mention of any Median king reigning when Babylon fell, which was taken as evidence against the existence of Cyaxares II as described by Xenophon.

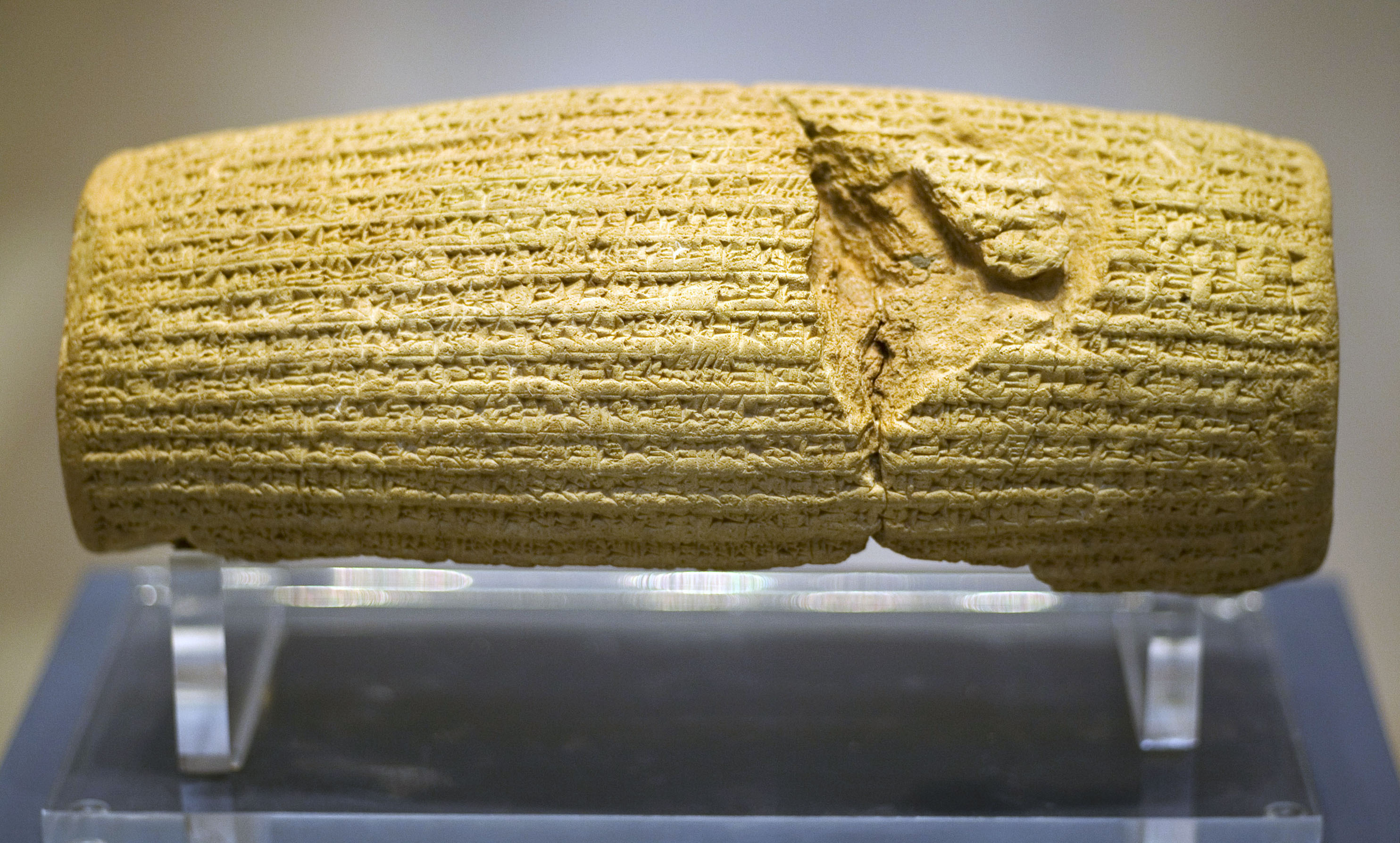
The Cyrus Cylinder (British Museum)

Modern scholarship recognizes the cylinder as a propaganda piece designed to manipulate public opinion against the Babylonian king Nabonidus and to legitimatize Cyrus' conquest of Babylon. It describes Cyrus as a liberator of the Babylonian people who restored the worship of Marduk after the neglect of such worship by Nabonidus, who is vilified throughout.

The Cyrus Cylinder states that Cyrus "made the land of Gutium and all the Umman-Manda bow in submission at his feet." Umman-Manda is taken by some authorities as a reference to Cyrus' subjugation of the Medes. However, according to Steven Anderson, this may be the means by which Cyrus gained the allegiance of the Median army after the successful campaign against the Lydians and their allies, upstaging Cyaxares II while still pledging allegiance to him. Regarding the "submission" of the Gutians and Umman-Manda, Anderson writes, "In order to justify these false propaganda claims, as well as to provide another opportunity for Cyrus to glorify himself, it became necessary to portray Cyrus as having actually conquered the Medes, rather than gradually appropriating control over the confederated Medo-Persian army, and finally succeeding the last Median king. ... If Cyrus was given lordship over the Median army before the fall of Babylon, this would fit with either Herodotus or Xenophon."

According to Xenophon's Cyropaedia (4.6.1-11), Gobryas, governor of Gutium under the suzerainty of the Babylonians, had a long-standing grudge against the Babylonian king. After Cyrus defeated Croesus, Gobryas came to Cyrus and indicated his allegiance. Gobryas figures prominently in events that follow, giving his advice about how to proceed in the capture of Babylon, and then leading the forces that took the city (5.4.41-50; 7.5.8-33). Although the basic outline of this account might be called into question because of Xenophon's desire to portray Cyrus as a master of tact and diplomacy, there is simply no other account that has survived explaining how the Gutians became followers of Cyrus and were in submission to him, as stated in the Cyrus Cylinder. Xenophon has support from the Nabonidus Chronicle, where Gobryas (Ugbaru), in agreement with the Cyropaedia, is called the governor of Gutium and the leader of the army of Cyrus in the capture of Babylon. Steven Hirsch concludes, "So Xenophon is right to claim that Cyrus enlisted the support of one Gobryas, a Babylonian vassal who was instrumental in the capture of Bablon. This detail is absent from Herodotus' account and from the extant portions of Ctesias' Persica."

=== The Nabonidus Chronicle ===
The Nabonidus Chronicle is an ancient Babylonian text, part of a larger series of Babylonian Chronicles inscribed in cuneiform script on clay tablets. Amélie Kuhrt describes the Nabonidus Chronicle as "the most reliable and sober [ancient] account of the fall of Babylon." However, the Chronicle has also been described as "a piece of propaganda at Cyrus's service". Its annalistic nature suggests that original documents from the reign of Nabonidus were the starting point of its texts, but these have been heavily edited to shed unfavorable light on Nabonidus as one who repeatedly neglected the new year festival in Babylon.

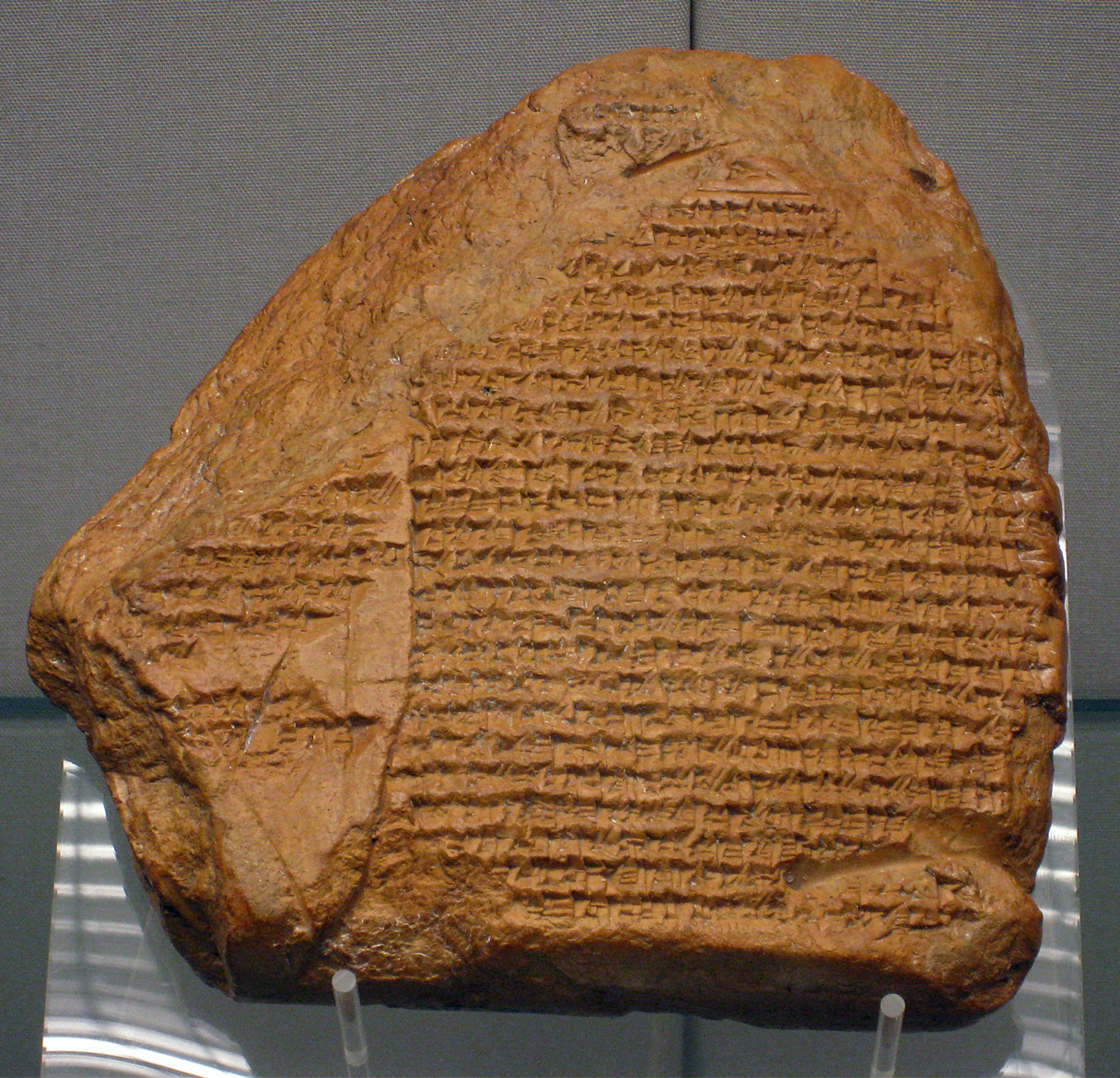
The Nabonidus Chronicle

In regard to the historicity Cyaxares II, the Chronicle agrees with Herodotus that the army of Ishtumegu of Agamantu (considered to be Astyages of Ectabana) revolted against him, whereupon "Cyrus, king of Anshan" conquered and pillaged Agamantu/Ectabana. This has been taken as supporting Herodotus with regard to the succession of kings in which Cyrus the Great immediately followed Astyages as king of both Media and Persia, with no intervening Cyaxares II. Although the agreement between the Nabonidus Chronicle and Herodotus, that Cyrus conquered Astyages and put an end to the Median kingdom, has seemed conclusive to most modern scholars, there remain some difficulties. One of these is the consideration that Herodotus and the Nabonidus Chronicle may not be independent witnesses. Herodotus said he had four versions of the upbringing of Cyrus and how he came to be king available to him, and he chose to present only one of them (Histories 1.95). The agreement of Herodotus with the Nabonidus Chronicle in this matter should not be regarded as two independent testimonies. The Nabonidus Chronicle supports Xenophon in relating that it was Ugbaru/Gobryas, governor of Gutium, who was general of the armies that conquered Babylon.

In a section that is partially defective, the Nabonidus Chronicle reports the death of the "wife of the king". This happened at some time before the end of the month in which the forces of Cyrus captured Babylon. If the king was Cyrus, as seems most probable, then the one who died was his first wife, Cassandane, mother of Cambyses II. Cambyses II was old enough to be prince regent when his father entered Babylon. If Cassandane had died at this time, it would shed light on the passage in the Cyropaedia (8.5.19) where Cyaxares II, maternal uncle of Cyrus, gave his daughter as bride to the recently bereaved Cyrus, with the kingdom of Media as her dowry. The death of the king's wife in the Nabonidus Chronicle would then explain why Cyrus would take a new queen in his middle years, as stated in the Cyropaedia. Most historians do not make any connection between the death of the king's wife in the Nabonidus Chronicle and Cyrus's taking a new wife shortly thereafter (Cyropaedia) because to do so would lend credence to the existence of Cyaxares II. One writer who makes the connection is William Shea.

=== Herodotus ===
The Histories of Herodotus was written sometime between 450 and 420 BC. Herodotus has no room for Cyaxares II in the Histories, because his narrative has Cyrus leading a successful rebellion against his maternal grandfather, Astyages king of the Medes. As a consequence, the Medes became "slaves" of the Persians (1.129,130). Herodotus states that Astyages had no male heir (1.109); this may be compared to Xenophon's statement (Cyropaedia 8.5.19) that it was Cyaxares (II), son of Astyages, who had no male heir. The lack of a male heir is an essential part of the story of Herodotus regarding the birth and upbringing of Cyrus, an account that is universally recognized as an adaptation of widespread myths about rejected sons becoming king. The animosity between Cyrus and Astyages that led to Cyrus' rebellion is an integral part of that myth. The rebellion is generally accepted as true by some modern historians.

== Resources ==
- Pritchard, James B., ed. (1969). Ancient Near Eastern Texts Relating to the Old Testament. Princeton: Princeton Univ. Press.
- Cyrus Cylinder Full Babylonian text of the Cyrus Cylinder as it was known in 2001; translation; brief introduction.
- Xenophon, Cyropaedia: the education of Cyrus, translated by Henry Graham Dakyns and revised by F.M. Stawell, Project Gutenberg.
